= Ellen Sarjeant =

New Zealand philanthropist

Ellen Agnes Neame (formerly Sarjeant, nee Stewart; 18 June 1868 - 22 September 1939) was an artist, curator, registrar and philanthropist based in Whanganui, New Zealand who was instrumental in the forming of the Sarjeant Gallery (now known as Te Whare o Rehua Sarjeant Gallery). She is most well known as Ellen Sarjeant after the legacy of the gallery.

== Biography ==
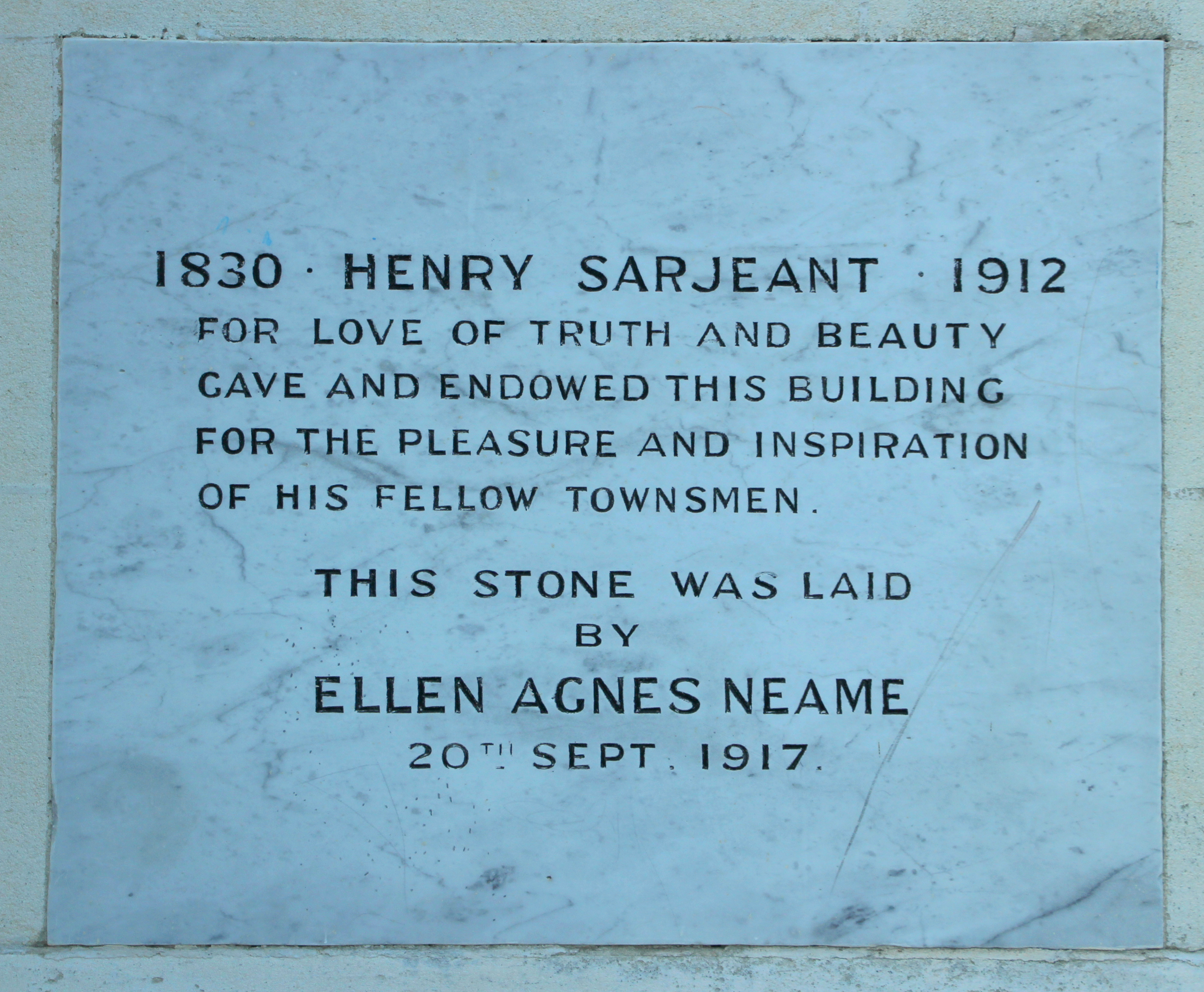
Sarjeant gallery stone laid by Ellen Sarjeant

Sarjeant was born Ellen Stewart in 1868 in Foxton, New Zealand, the eldest daughter of married couple John Tiffin Stewart and Frances Ann Carkeek. Her mother was a social activist. Her father was born in Rothesay, Scotland and was a civil engineer. One of his friends was Henry Sarjeant.

On 11 February 1893, Ellen Stewart married Henry Sarjeant at Christ Church on Victoria Avenue in Whanganui. He was almost 40 years her senior - she was 22 and he was 63. Henry Sarjeant designed their city house The Loggia, 47 Bell Street, Whanganui based on an Italian villa they stayed at during their two-year honeymoon around Europe.

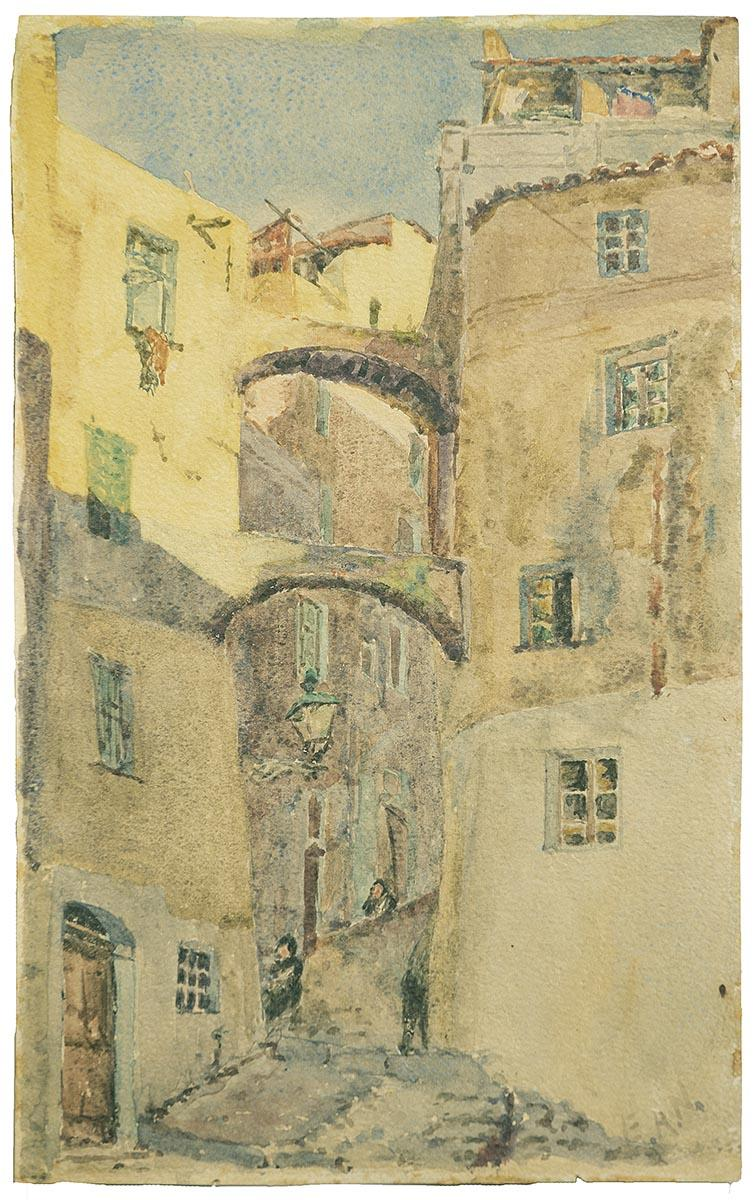
A Street in San Remo by Ellen Neame

Ellen Sarjeant was a founding committee member of the Wanganui Arts and Crafts Society established in 1901. Her father was also a founding member, serving as vice president. The Society held exhibitions of artwork, and also collected artwork. Its first purchase was by C. F. Goldie. Henry Sarjeant died on 12 February 1912, and in his will bequeathed funds to the Wanganui Borough Council to enable the building of the Sarjeant Gallery and fund its collections. Ellen Sarjeant played a pivotal role in the early administration of the gallery and the acquisition of art for its collection.

After Henry Sarjeant died, Ellen Sarjeant married John Armstrong Neame in April 1913, changing her surname to Neame.

Sarjeant / Neame was an artist, with some of her sketches shown at the third annual exhibition of the Wanganui Society of Arts and Crafts in 1904. Her art included watercolour landscapes and small flower paintings. She was exhibited at Walker's Galleries in New Bond Street, London in 1935.

Ellen Neame travelled extensively in Europe, painting and studying art, and lived in Italy for a time. She died in London on 22 September 1939. In Whanganui, the flag on the City Council offices was flown at half-mast as a mark of respect for Neame's contribution to the city.
