= Henry Sarjeant =

New Zealand farmer and benefactor

Henry Sarjeant (1829–1912) was a New Zealand farmer and benefactor. He was born in Rangeworthy, Gloucestershire, England in 1829.

He married Ellen Stewart on 11 February 1893. She was the daughter of John Tiffin Stewart and Frances Ann Stewart.

The Sarjeant Gallery was built as the result of a bequest by Sarjeant to the city of Whanganui in 1912. He bequeathed the money "for the inspiration of ourselves and those who come after us."
