= Karitane hospitals =

New Zealand hospitals for babies

The Karitane Hospitals were six hospitals in New Zealand run by the Plunket Society, located in Auckland, Christchurch, Dunedin, Invercargill, Wanganui and Wellington. They were established as training hospitals for Karitane nurses and cared for babies with malnutrition and other dietetic complaints, and premature babies. They also offered mother care training and assistance. The first hospital opened in 1907 and the hospitals were closed between 1978 and 1980 due to financial difficulties and changes in society and maternity services.

== History ==
Until 1939 the services in Karitane hospitals were generally free, though some users did pay for care. The costs of running the hospitals were largely covered by the fees paid by Karitane nurse trainees. With the changes in health care instituted by the Labour government in the 1930s–1940s the hospitals' monopoly on caring for premature babies was lost. In 1939 (under the Social Security Act) treatment in hospitals became free and the Karitane hospitals were not permitted to charge fees, though the government did subsidise mothers and babies being cared for. By the late 1950s Karitane hospitals were facing financial difficulties and possible closure but in 1958 the government made emergency grants to keep the hospitals open. The 1959 Consultative Committee on Infant and Pre-school Health Services in New Zealand investigated Plunket and the role of and need for the Karitane hospitals. The Committee supported the work of Karitane hospitals and increasing government subsidies.

The National government increased the subsidies to private hospitals in 1962 which helped the financial stability of the Karitane hospitals. In 1978 it was decided that the hospitals would be closed and replaced by Plunket's family support units. The hospitals' running costs had increased, occupancy was not sufficient and they handled only 4% of Plunket's caseload.

== Karitane nurses ==
All the Karitane hospitals trained Karitane nurses, while Plunket nurses were trained only in the Dunedin hospital until 1964 when Auckland became a training school for Plunket nurses. Plunket nurses had to be registered nurses or midwives but Karitane nurses did not. Plunket nurses could work in the community for Plunket or in Karitane hospitals while Karitane nurses worked as baby nurses in private homes. They were often in demand both in New Zealand and in Britain.

After the war there was a shortage of nurses and many nurses left after training either going overseas or taking up positions in the nurseries in public hospitals where there were better employment conditions.

Karitane training was initially 12 months but increased to 16. In the 1930s the cost of training was £40. A disadvantage of the training was that trainees saw only unwell babies. This was rectified by having some 'normal' babies at the hospital and by employing single mothers as domestic staff. This option for single mothers was an alternative to adopting their babies out.

In 1974, with changes in society, the training programme was changed to twelve months in the hospital plus six months in the community, in homes with Plunket nurses and in early childhood centres.

== The hospitals ==
Each hospital catered for about 30 babies and 10 mothers. They were staffed by matrons, nurses, honorary visiting doctors and the Karitane nurse trainees.

=== Dunedin ===
The first hospital in Dunedin was opened by Truby King in 1907 in his holiday cottage on the Karitane Peninsula. It was called the Karitane Home for Babies but became the Karitane-Harris Hospital after moving in 1910 to a home donated by Wolf Harris, a wealthy Dunedinite. Architect Arthur Louis Salmond designed a new building which opened in 1939. It closed in July 1978. Anne Pattrick was matron in 1920.

In 2011 it was reported that the hospital building, which had been used as a rest home and backpackers' hostel, was to be converted into apartments. In 2014 the refurbishment project received a grant from the Dunedin City Council. In 2015 the hospital, located in Every St, was listed as a Category 1 historic place by Heritage New Zealand.

=== Christchurch ===
In 1917 the Lady King Karitane Hospital opened in Cashmere in the former home of Sir Heaton Rhodes. A new hospital, designed by architects Warren and Mahoney, was opened in 1963 following funding from the government but it closed in December 1978.

=== Wanganui ===
The Truby King–Stewart Karitane Hospital opened in 1919 in the former residence of John Stewart and his wife Frances in King St. In 1930 a nurses' home was added and new block in 1966.

=== Auckland ===
Moves to establish an Auckland Karitane hospital commenced in 1923 and a property was donated by A.C. Caughey, one of the founders of the firm Smith and Caughey's. It was a large house of 16 rooms in McLean St, Mt Albert. Fundraising in 1923–1924 raised the necessary £15,000 to adapt the house. The hospital was officially opened by the mayor, Sir James Gunson, on 16 October 1924 with more than 1000 people in attendance.

At the outset the purpose of the hospital had to be defined. It was not a foundling hospital or a home for sick babies needing cures for infant diseases but for babies suffering from malnutrition or dietetic conditions. In the 1930s the Karitane hospital cared for all premature babies from Auckland and St Helens Hospitals. It assisted new mothers, especially helping them to breast feed, and ran a mothercraft home. Because it was a training hospital for Karitane nurses and cared for premature babies the hospital had a high ratio of nurses to babies e.g. 18 babies and 16 nurses in 1926.

In 1935 the hospital was renamed the Truby King Karitane Hospital in recognition of King's work for the Plunket Society. In the 1950s, due to the opening of Cornwall Hospital, Karitane was no longer the centre for care of premature babies. In spite of this and financial problems plans for a new Karitane hospital were begun in 1953 and the foundation stone was laid in 1957 by the Governor General Sir Willoughby Norrie. The new hospital, designed by architects Haughey and Fox, was opened on 14 June 1962 by the Health Minister Don MacKay. The old building became the nurses' home. In the same year the hospital benefitted from the increase in government subsidies to private hospitals, putting it in a better financial position.

In the 1970s it was noted that the hospital was taking almost no premature babies or poorly fed babies but caring for babies who showed failure to thrive due to poor social circumstances. The hospital's services were free and many admissions came from underprivileged homes. The hospital continued to train Karitane nurses, and Plunket nurses from 1964. The hospital closed in October 1978, and the building was put up for sale.

==== Staff ====
Dr William Henry Parkes was the first senior medical officer from 1924 to 1933, followed by Dr Tracy Inglis (1933–1935), Dr Harold Pettit (1935–1950), Dr Basil Quin (1950–1973), Dr Alison Hunter (1973–1974), Dr Margaret Liley (1974–1978). Dr Edward Sayers was also on the medical team, handing over to Dr Alice Bush when he served in World War II. Bush worked at Karitane from 1940 to 1974 and became a paediatrician and family planning advocate.

There was a high turnover of matrons in the first few years, many of them working in other Karitane hospitals or in other nursing positions in Plunket. Some of the later matrons were Miss Sydney Lusk (1939–1945), Miss W.M. Slater (1945–1950), Miss A.M. Longden (1950–1951), Mrs M. Boyce (1951–1954), Miss K.B. Beuke (1957–1971) and Miss Lorna Leman (1971–1978).

=== Invercargill ===
The Karitane-Hunt Hospital was opened in December 1926 in a house and garden donated by W.D. Hunt. In 1955 a new hospital opened after most of the original hospital was demolished in 1948. Although the local Plunket Society campaigned to keep it open the hospital closed in March 1980.

=== Wellington ===
In 1925 a public meeting was held to establish a Karitane Hospital in Wellington. Truby King donated two acres (three-quarters of a hectare) of his land in Melrose, where there was already a Karitane Products Society factory and King's house. £25,000 was raised. The building was designed by the architects Gray Young Morton and Young. The hospital was opened by the Duchess of York on 5 March 1927. Its official name was the Sir Truby and Lady King Karitane Hospital. The hospital closed in July 1978. The building, which was earthquake prone, was demolished in 2020. It was in private ownership despite being in the Truby King Historic Area which is on the heritage list held by Heritage New Zealand.

A nurses' home building was opened in 1964. It was earthquake strengthened and used as housing.

==== Staff ====
Montgomery Spencer (1893–1943) was honorary paediatrician from 1934.

== Australian Karitane centres ==
Truby King's influence spread to Australia resulting in the formation of the Australian Mothercraft Society in 1923. In 1970 the name changed to the Karitane Mothercraft Society and Karitane centres have continued operation.
