= Paul Rayner =

British-born New Zealand ceramicist and painter (b. 1959)

Paul Rayner (born 1959) is an English-New Zealand ceramicist known for his work creating pop culture figures in the tradition of Toby jugs and Staffordshire figurines.

Born in Luton, England, Rayner moved to New Zealand as a teenager. After working at the Sarjeant Gallery in Whanganui, he developed an interest in art. Rayner did a Bachelor of Fine Arts focused on painting at the University of Auckland before working in New Zealand museums and art galleries while developing his ceramics.

After leaving the Sarjeant Gallery in 2006, Paul has run a gallery and often collaborates with his brother Mark Rayner.

== Works ==
- Ken & Ken (the Topp Twins) 2011 is held by Te Papa
- Caring is our strength; 'The lover of swans' was poster for the Gay Hero Art Exhibition 1992
- Carmen 2004, is held by the Dowse Art Museum

== Exhibitions ==
- 2008 ID Me, Suter Gallery, Nelson
- 2008 Magic of Mud, Dowse Art Museum, Lower Hutt
- 2004 House of Dowse, Dowse Art Museum, Lower Hutt
- 2001 Wanganui Artists, Parliament Buildings, Wellington
- 2000 Keep off the Grass, Pataka Museum, Porirua
