= Anne Pattrick =

New Zealand plunket nurse and nursing administrator

Anne Pattrick (1881–1937) was a New Zealand Plunket nurse and nursing administrator. She was born in Christchurch, North Canterbury, New Zealand in 1881. She was director of nursing for Plunket, in charge of the Karitane hospitals from 1921.
