= F. Whitlock & Sons Ltd =

F. Whitlock and Sons Ltd was a New Zealand-based company, well known for producing a popular range of Whitlock's pickles and sauces onwards from 1877.

== Company history ==
The company was started by Frederick Whitlock (1833–1908) in Wanganui, New Zealand. Initially, manufacturing took place in the backyard of Frederick's residence before a purpose-built factory was built in London Street, Wanganui in around 1902.

Products manufactured included Tomato Sauce, Worcestershire Sauce, Chutney, Chow Chow, Piccalilli, Vinegar, Cordials and Liqueur flavourings. In the early days, product was distributed by horse and cart locally and by ship to Nelson, Wellington, New Plymouth, Dunedin, Timaru, Christchurch, Greymouth and Auckland.

F. Whitlock & Sons Ltd was very much a family business, with four generations of Whitlocks joining and running the company before it was sold in 1985 to Australian company R M Gow Ltd. Thereafter, the company changed hands a couple more times before being purchased by another well known New Zealand food manufacturer, Cerebos Gregg Ltd. A short time later, the original plant and fittings were removed to Auckland and the Wanganui land and factory buildings were sold.

In 2018 Kraft Heinz acquired Cerebos Gregg Ltd and along with it F. Whitlock & Sons Ltd.
