= Whanganui =

- City
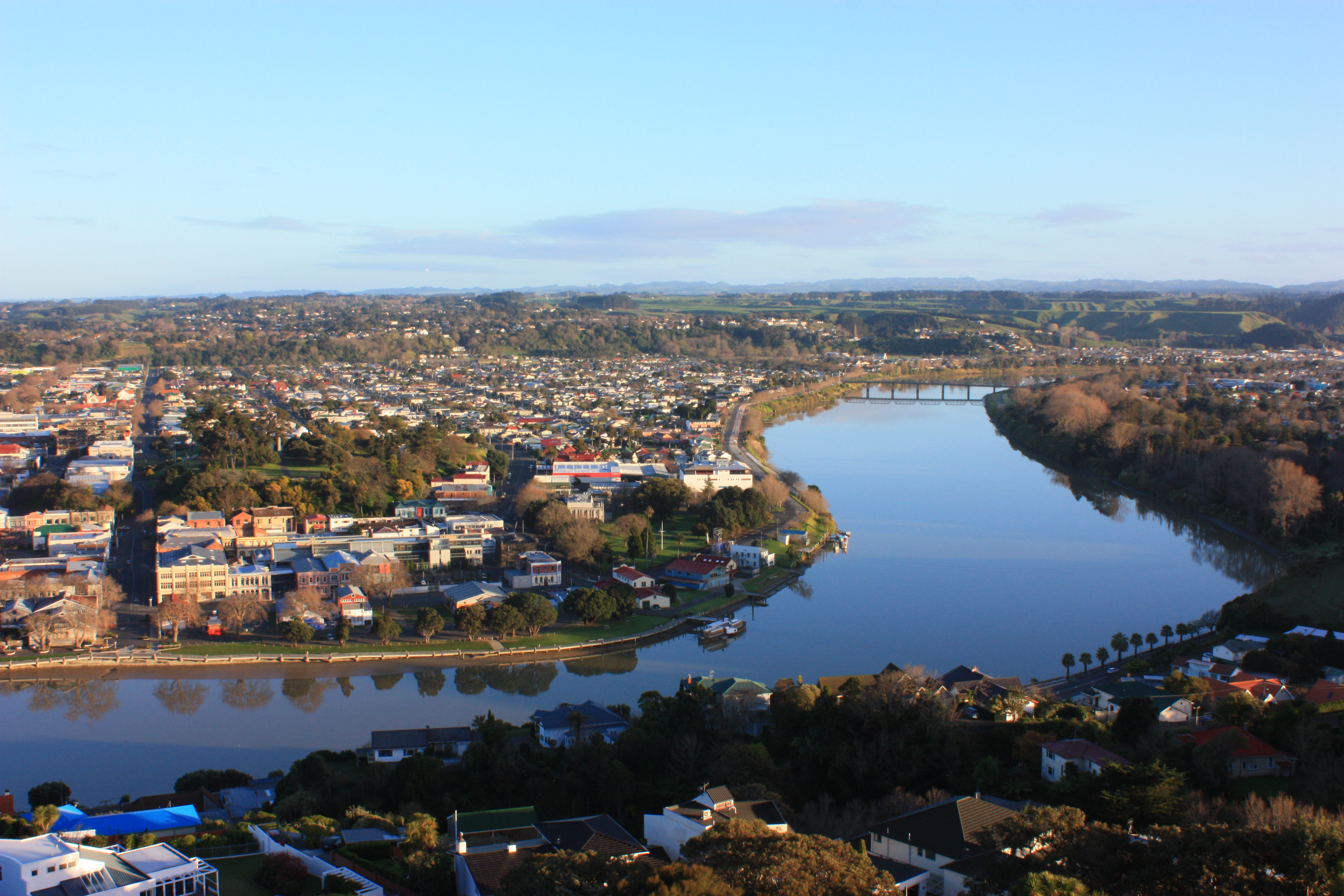

- Flag Coat of arms
- Nickname: The River City
- Motto: Sans Dieu Rien, English: Without God Nothing
- Location within New Zealand
- Coordinates: 39°55′57″S 175°03′07″E
- Country: New Zealand
- Region: Manawatū-Whanganui
- Territorial authority: Whanganui District Council

Government
  - Mayor: Andrew Tripe
  - Deputy Mayor: Michael Law

Area
  - Territorial: 2,373.26 km^{2} (916.32 sq mi)
  - Urban: 41.05 km^{2} (15.85 sq mi)

Population (June 2025)
  - Territorial: 49,200
  - Density: 20.7/km^{2} (53.7/sq mi)
  - Urban: 42,800
  - Urban density: 1,040/km^{2} (2,700/sq mi)
- Postcode(s): 4500, 4501
- Area code: 06
- Website: Whanganui.govt.nz

Whanganui, (Note: (/ˈwɒŋənu.i/ WONG-ə-noo-ee, Māori (local dialect) pronunciation [ˀwa.ŋaˈnʉi], Māori (Waikato dialect) pronunciation [faːŋaˈnʉi]) also spelt Wanganui, is a city in the Manawatū-Whanganui region of New Zealand. The city is located on the west coast of the North Island at the mouth of the Whanganui River, New Zealand's longest navigable waterway. Whanganui is the 19th most-populous urban area in New Zealand and the second-most-populous in Manawatū-Whanganui, with a population of 42,800 as of June 2025.

Whanganui is the ancestral home of Te Āti Haunui-a-Pāpārangi and other Whanganui Māori tribes. The New Zealand Company began to settle the area in 1840, establishing its second settlement after Wellington. In the early years, most European settlers came via Wellington. Whanganui greatly expanded in the 1870s, and freezing works, woollen mills, phosphate works and wool stores were established in the town. Today, much of Whanganui's economy relates directly to the fertile and prosperous farming hinterland.

Like several New Zealand urban areas, it was officially designated a city until an administrative reorganisation in 1989, and is now run by Whanganui District Council. In 2021 it was added to the Design Cities (UNESCO), becoming the only city of design to be located in New Zealand.

== Toponymy ==
The first name of the settlement was Petre (pronounced Peter), named after Lord Petre, an officer of the New Zealand Company, but it was never popular and was officially dropped in 1854. Whanga nui is a Māori language phrase meaning "big bay" or "big harbour".

=== Controversy over Wanganui/Whanganui spelling ===
In the local dialect, Māori pronounce the wh in Whanganui as [ˀw], a voiced labial–velar approximant combined with a glottal stop, but to non-locals the name sounds like "Wanganui" and is hard to reproduce.

In 1991, the New Zealand Geographic Board considered demands from some local Māori to change the name of the river to Whanganui. The Wanganui District Council opposed the change. Letters of both support and opposition were received during this time. After some deliberation, the Board decided to change the spelling of the river's name from Wanganui to Whanganui.

A non-binding referendum was held in Wanganui in 2006, where 82% voted to retain the city's name Wanganui without an 'h'. Turnout was 55.4%. Despite the clear results, the spelling of the name continued to be surrounded by controversy.

Iwi group Te Rūnanga o Tupoho applied to the New Zealand Geographic Board to change the city's name to Whanganui in February 2009, and in late March the Board found there were grounds for the change. Public submissions on the proposal were relatively equal, with a slim majority in favour of keeping the status quo. Wanganui Mayor Michael Laws spoke strongly against the proposed change. A second referendum was held in May 2009, and residents again overwhelmingly rejected changing the city's name, with 22% voting to change it to Whanganui and 77% voting to retain the name as Wanganui. Voter turnout was 61%, the highest in a Wanganui referendum, reflecting the widespread controversy. In September 2009 the Geographic Board handed the decision to the Minister for Land & Information. Despite the referendum results, the Geographic Board recommended to the Minister that the name should be spelt Whanganui. In December 2009, the government decided that while either spelling was acceptable, Crown agencies would use the spelling "Whanganui", with Wanganui being acceptable as an alternative official name.

On 17 November 2015 Land Information New Zealand (LINZ) announced that Wanganui District would be renamed to Whanganui District. In September 2019, the region that Whanganui District Council is part of was renamed from Manawatu-Wanganui to Manawatū-Whanganui.

== History ==
=== Māori settlement ===
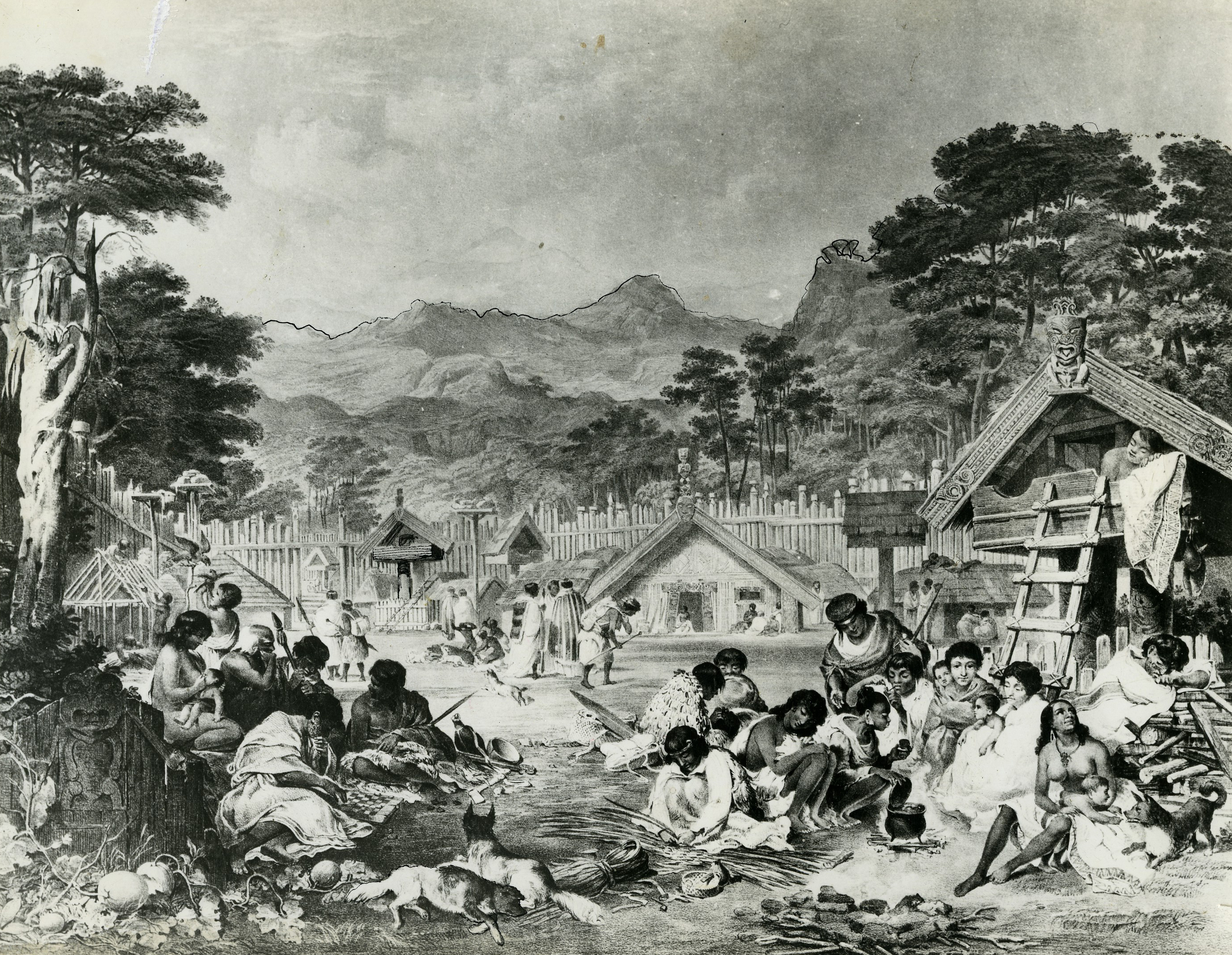
Pūtiki pā on the Whanganui River in 1850

The area around the mouth of the Whanganui river was a major site of pre-European Māori settlement. The pā named Pūtiki (a contraction of Pūtikiwharanui) was and is home to the Ngāti Tupoho hapū of the iwi Te Āti Haunui-a-Pāpārangi. It took its name from the legendary explorer Tamatea Pōkai Whenua, who sent a servant ashore to find flax for tying up his topknot (pūtiki).

In the 1820s, coastal tribes in the area assaulted the Kapiti Island stronghold of Ngāti Toa chief Te Rauparaha. Te Rauparaha retaliated in 1830, sacking Pūtiki and slaughtering the inhabitants.

=== European settlement ===
The first European traders arrived in 1831, followed in 1840 by missionaries Octavius Hadfield and Henry Williams who collected signatures for the Treaty of Waitangi. On 20 June 1840, the Revd John Mason, Mrs Mason, Mr Richard Matthews (a lay catechist) and his wife Johanna arrived to establish a mission station of the Church Missionary Society (CMS). The Revd Richard Taylor joined the CMS mission station in 1843. The Revd Mason drowned on 5 January 1843 while crossing the Turakina River. By 1844 the brick church built by Mason was inadequate to meet the needs of the congregation, and it had been damaged in an earthquake. A new church was built under the supervision of Taylor, with the timber supplied by each pā on the river in proportion to its size and number of Christians.

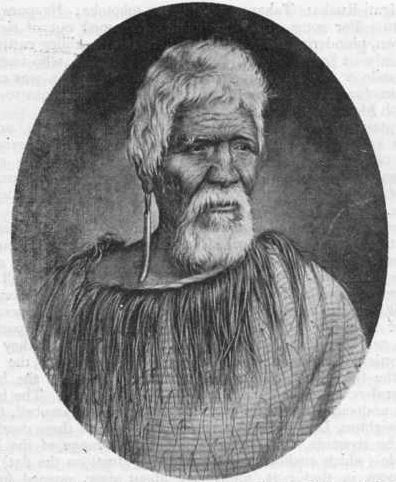
Hēmi Tōpine Te Mamaku (c. 1790 – 1887), a Māori chief in the Ngāti Hāua-te-rangi iwi.

After the New Zealand Company had settled Wellington it looked for other suitable places for settlers. William Wakefield, younger brother of Edward Gibbon Wakefield, negotiated the sale of 40,000 acres in 1840, and a town named Petre – after Lord Petre, one of the directors of the New Zealand Company – was established four kilometres from the river mouth. The settlement was threatened in 1846 by Te Mamaku, a chief from up the Whanganui River. The British military arrived on 13 December 1846 to defend the township. Two stockades, the Rutland and York, were built to defend the settlers. Two minor battles were fought on 19 May and 19 July 1847 and after a stalemate the up river iwi returned home. By 1850, Te Mamaku was receiving Christian instruction from Revd Taylor. There were further incidents in 1847 when four members of the Gilfillan family were murdered and their house plundered.

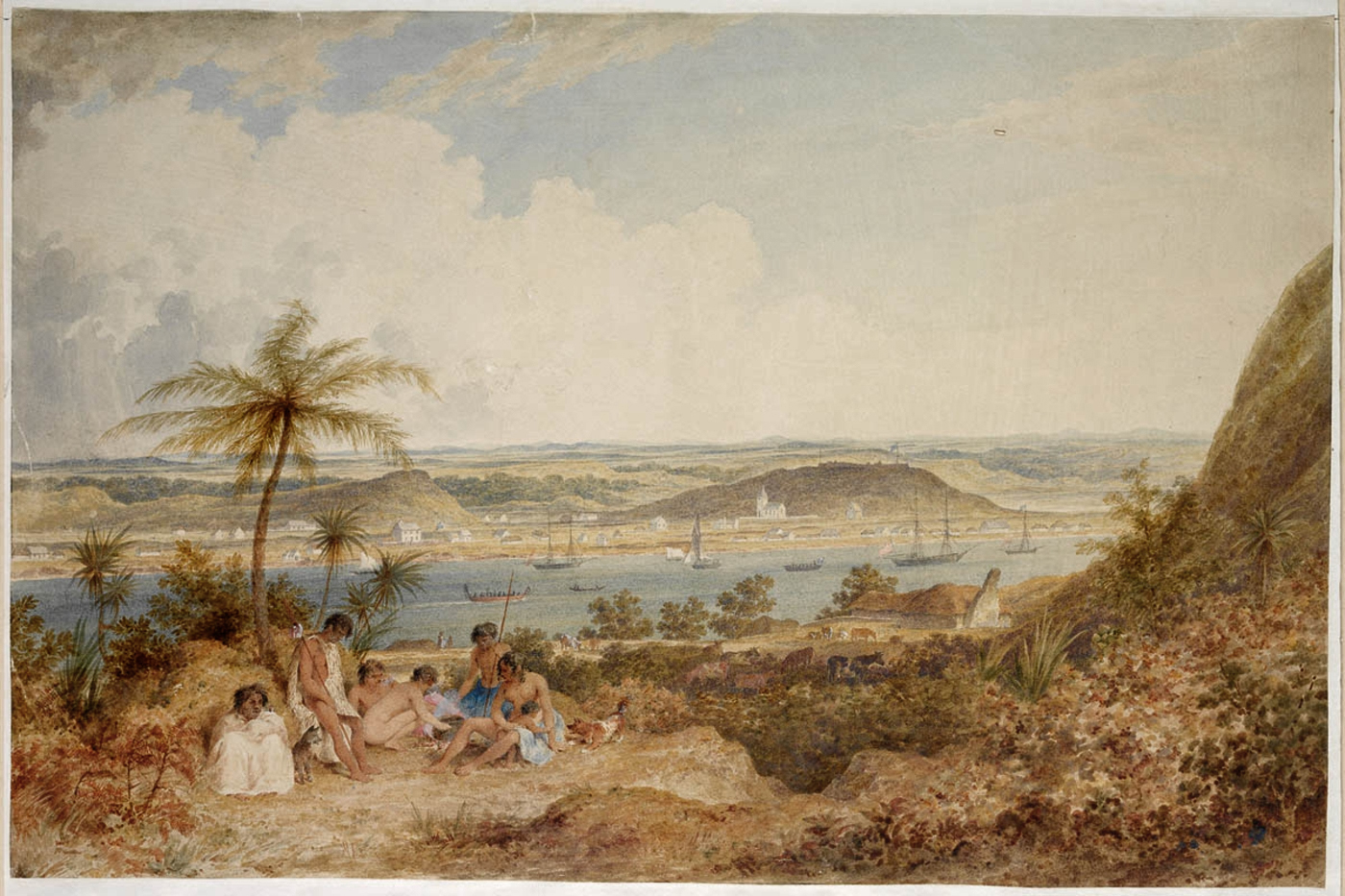
View of Whanganui, New Zealand, 1847, John Alexander Gilfillan, watercolour

The name of the city was officially changed to Wanganui on 20 January 1854. The early years of the new city were problematic. Purchase of land from the local tribes had been haphazard and irregular, and as such, many Māori were angered by the influx of Pākehā onto land that they still claimed. It was not until the town had been established for eight years that agreements were finally reached between the colonials and local tribes, and some resentment continued (and still filters through to the present day).

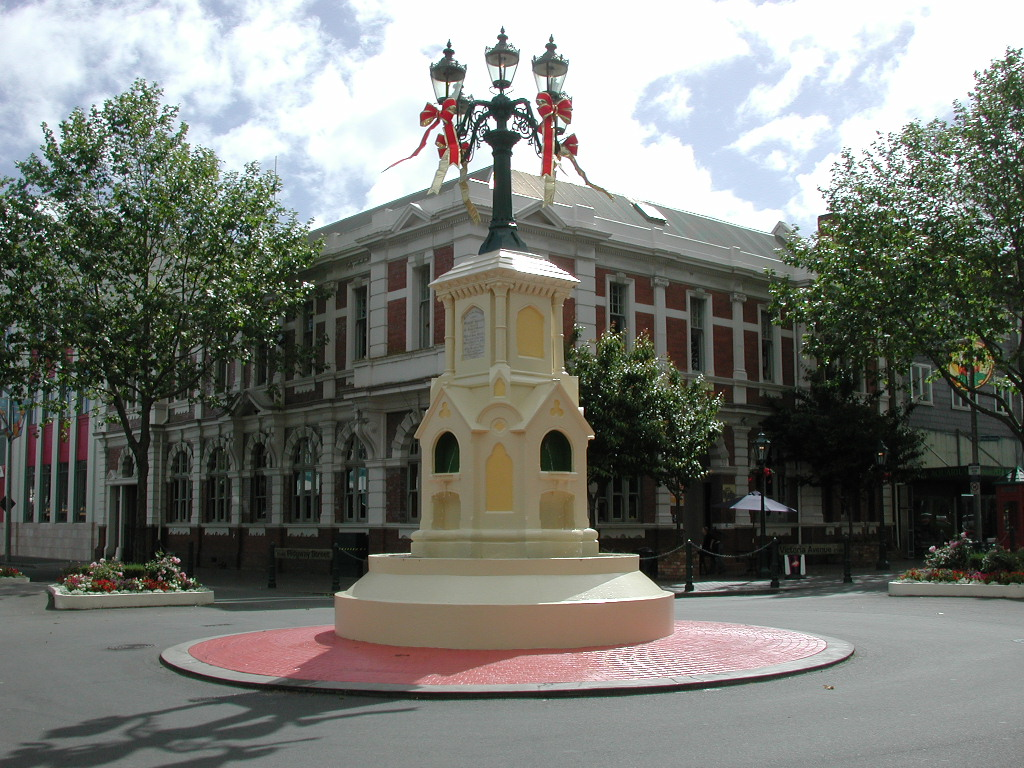
The Watt Fountain in Victoria Avenue. The former Post Office building is in the background.

Wanganui grew rapidly after this time, with land being cleared for pasture. The town was a major military centre during the New Zealand Wars of the 1860s, although local Māori at Pūtiki led by Te Keepa Te Rangihiwinui remained friendly to settlers. In 1871, a town bridge was built, followed six years later by a railway bridge at Aramoho. Wanganui was linked by rail to both New Plymouth and Wellington by 1886. The town was incorporated as a Borough on 1 February 1872, with William Hogg Watt the first Mayor. It was then declared a city on 1 July 1924.

==== Wanganui Women's Political League ====
As an alternative to the Wanganui chapter of the Women's Christian Temperance Union of New Zealand, Margaret Bullock formed a club for women activists in 1893, originally as the Wanganui Women's Franchise League. Ellen Ballance, the second wife of the former Premier John Ballance was the inaugural president until she left for England. Bullock then served as president when the franchise for women was won and the organisation's name changed to the Women's Political League. The membership rolls reached to nearly 3000 at its height. Monthly meetings focused on feminist scholarly inquiry, and Ellen Ballance donated her husband's library to the club. Bullock and Jessie Williamson led the club's connections with the National Council of Women of New Zealand. By 1903, a year in which Bullock died and Williamson moved to Christchurch, the club's activities had declined and its library collection was donated to the local public library.

=== 20th century ===
In 1920, the mayor, Charles Mackay, shot and wounded a young poet, Walter D'Arcy Cresswell, who had been blackmailing him over his homosexuality. Mackay served seven years in prison and his name was erased from the town's civic monuments, while Cresswell, despite also being homosexual, was praised as a "wholesome-minded young man". Mackay's name was restored to the foundation stone of the Sarjeant Gallery in 1985.

The Whanganui River catchment is seen as a sacred area to Māori, and the Whanganui region is still seen as a focal point for any resentment over land ownership. In 1995, Moutoa Gardens in Wanganui, known to local Māori as Pakaitore, were occupied for 79 days in a mainly peaceful protest by the Whanganui iwi over land claims.

On 18 November 1982, a suicide bomber attacked the facility housing the National Law Enforcement System. The attacker, a "punk rock" anarchist named Neil Roberts, was the only person killed, and the computer system was undamaged.

== Geography ==
Whanganui is on the South Taranaki Bight, close to the mouth of the Whanganui River. It is 200 km (120 mi) north of Wellington and 75 km (47 mi) northwest of Palmerston North, at the junction of State Highways 3 and 4. Most of the city lies on the river's northwestern bank, because of the greater extent of flat land. The river is crossed by five bridges: Cobham Bridge, City Bridge, Dublin Street Bridge, Aramoho Railway Bridge (rail and pedestrians only), and a cycle bridge at Upokongaro which was opened in 2020.

Both Mount Ruapehu and Mount Taranaki can be seen from Durie Hill and other vantage points around the city.

=== Suburbs and localities ===
The suburbs within Whanganui include (clockwise from central Watt Fountain):

- Northeast: Whanganui East, Bastia Hill, Aramoho
- East: Durie Hill
- South: Pūtiki
- West: Gonville, Castlecliff, Tawhero
- Northwest: Springvale St Johns Hill, Otamatea

=== Climate ===
Whanganui enjoys a temperate climate, with slightly above the national average sunshine (2100 hours per annum), and about 900 mm (35 in) of annual rainfall. Several light frosts are normally experienced in winter. The river is prone to flooding after heavy rain in the catchment, and in June 2015 record flooding occurred with 100 households evacuated. Whanganui's climate is particularly moderate. In 2012, the Federated Farmers Whanganui president, Brian Doughty, said the district's temperate climate meant any type of farming was viable.

Climate data for Whanganui (1991–2020)
Month	Jan	Feb	Mar	Apr	May	Jun	Jul	Aug	Sep	Oct	Nov	Dec	Year
Mean daily maximum °C (°F)	22.6 (72.7)	23.0 (73.4)	21.6 (70.9)	19.1 (66.4)	16.7 (62.1)	14.3 (57.7)	13.6 (56.5)	14.3 (57.7)	15.8 (60.4)	17.1 (62.8)	18.7 (65.7)	21.0 (69.8)	18.2 (64.8)
Daily mean °C (°F)	18.3 (64.9)	18.6 (65.5)	17.1 (62.8)	14.9 (58.8)	12.8 (55.0)	10.6 (51.1)	9.7 (49.5)	10.4 (50.7)	11.9 (53.4)	13.4 (56.1)	14.8 (58.6)	17.0 (62.6)	14.1 (57.4)
Mean daily minimum °C (°F)	14.1 (57.4)	14.1 (57.4)	12.7 (54.9)	10.6 (51.1)	8.8 (47.8)	6.8 (44.2)	5.8 (42.4)	6.6 (43.9)	8.1 (46.6)	9.6 (49.3)	10.9 (51.6)	13.0 (55.4)	10.1 (50.2)
Average rainfall mm (inches)	58.1 (2.29)	69.6 (2.74)	60.5 (2.38)	84.5 (3.33)	80.8 (3.18)	90.3 (3.56)	87.0 (3.43)	83.5 (3.29)	75.9 (2.99)	89.1 (3.51)	75.3 (2.96)	89.5 (3.52)	944.1 (37.18)
Average rainy days (≥ 1.0 mm)	6.3	6.4	7.6	8.9	10.0	11.6	11.3	12.1	10.5	10.5	9.2	9.6	114
Average relative humidity (%)	72.8	77.3	78.6	79.5	82.2	83.7	84.0	81.5	75.3	75.7	72.2	72.2	77.9
Mean monthly sunshine hours	250.2	213.5	192.1	159.4	129.0	99.2	120.7	137.8	147.5	180.5	203.6	221.9	2,055
Mean daily daylight hours	14.6	13.6	12.3	11.0	9.9	9.4	9.7	10.6	11.8	13.2	14.3	15.0	12.1
Percentage possible sunshine	56	56	50	49	42	35	40	42	42	44	47	48	46
Source 1: NIWA Climate Data (sun 1981–2010)
Source 2: Weather Spark

== Demographics ==
Stats New Zealand describes Whanganui as a large urban area which covers 41.05 km^{2} (15.85 sq mi) and had an estimated population of 42,800 as of June 2025, with a population density of 1,043 people per km^{2}.

Historical population
Year	Pop.	±% p.a.
2013	36,693	—
2018	39,777	+1.63%
2023	41,481	+0.84%

Whanganui urban area had a population of 41,481 in the 2023 New Zealand census, an increase of 1,704 people (4.3%) since the 2018 census, and an increase of 4,788 people (13.0%) since the 2013 census. There were 19,866 males, 21,468 females, and 147 people of other genders in 16,767 dwellings. 3.2% of people identified as LGBTIQ+. The median age was 42.6 years (compared with 38.1 years nationally). There were 7,938 people (19.1%) aged under 15 years, 6,882 (16.6%) aged 15 to 29, 17,178 (41.4%) aged 30 to 64, and 9,486 (22.9%) aged 65 or older.

People could identify as more than one ethnicity. The results were 77.1% European (Pākehā); 29.4% Māori; 4.5% Pasifika; 5.5% Asian; 0.6% Middle Eastern, Latin American and African New Zealanders (MELAA); and 2.7% other, which includes people giving their ethnicity as "New Zealander". English was spoken by 97.0%, Māori by 8.2%, Samoan by 0.8%, and other languages by 6.6%. No language could be spoken by 2.0% (e.g. too young to talk). New Zealand Sign Language was known by 0.7%. The percentage of people born overseas was 13.8, compared with 28.8% nationally.

Religious affiliations were 32.0% Christian, 0.9% Hindu, 0.3% Islam, 3.3% Māori religious beliefs, 0.5% Buddhist, 0.7% New Age, 0.1% Jewish, and 1.3% other religions. People who answered that they had no religion were 53.1%, and 8.1% of people did not answer the census question.

Of those at least 15 years old, 5,562 (16.6%) people had a bachelor's or higher degree, 18,819 (56.1%) had a post-high school certificate or diploma, and 9,159 (27.3%) people exclusively held high school qualifications. The median income was $32,000, compared with $41,500 nationally. 1,809 people (5.4%) earned over $100,000 compared to 12.1% nationally. The employment status of those at least 15 was 14,055 (41.9%) full-time, 4,512 (13.5%) part-time, and 1,257 (3.7%) unemployed.

Individual SA3 statistical areas
Name	Area (km^{2})	Population	Density (per km^{2})	Dwellings	Median age	Median income
Aramoho	3.65	4,212	1,154	1,638	37.7 years	$31,700
Otamatea	2.70	1,833	679	735	54.9 years	$35,800
Whanganui East	4.41	6,273	1,422	2,610	42.0 years	$30,300
St Johns Hill	2.25	3,396	1,509	1,431	52.6 years	$34,800
Whanganui Centre	5.53	5,652	1,022	2,490	42.3 years	$29,700
Castlecliff	10.28	7,089	690	2,604	37.5 years	$31,600
Springvale	2.70	3,621	1,341	1,530	47.3 years	$34,600
Bastia-Durie Hill-Putiki	5.92	2,940	497	1,200	48.9 years	$38,700
Gonville	3.62	6,459	1,784	2,532	38.4 years	$30,300
New Zealand					38.1 years	$41,500

== Economy ==
In 2013, 2014, 2015 and 2016, Whanganui was included in the world's Smart21 Intelligent Communities by the Intelligent Community Forum.

Whanganui has a strong industry base, with a history of niche manufacturing. Current businesses include Q-West Boat Builders, based at the Port who have built boats for customers from around New Zealand and the world and were awarded a contract in 2015 to build two 34-meter passenger ferries for Auckland ferry company Fullers. Pacific Helmets is another example of award-winning niche manufacturing in the district, winning a Silver Pin at the Best Design Awards in October 2015. Heads Road is Whanganui's main industrial area and is home to a number of manufacturing and engineering operations. The Wanganui Port, once the centre of industrial transport, still has some traffic but is more noted for the Q-West boat building operation there. F. Whitlock & Sons Ltd was a notable company, first established in 1902.

Much of Whanganui's economy relates directly to the fertile and prosperous farming hinterland near the town. Whanganui is well known for embracing the production of several new pear varieties, including the Crimson Gem. In May 2016, it was reported that the majority of the Whanganui pear crop had been wiped out before the upcoming pear season.

== Whanganui District ==
The Whanganui District covers 2,337 km^{2} (902 sq mi), the majority of which is hill country, with a narrow coastal strip of flat land and a major urban settlement on the lower banks of the Whanganui River. A large proportion of this is within the Whanganui National Park, established in 1986.

The region is known for its outstanding natural environment, with the Whanganui Awa (River) at its heart. It is the second-largest river in the North Island, the longest navigable waterway in the country, and runs for 290 km (180 mi) from the heights of Mount Tongariro to Wanganui's coast and the Tasman Sea. Every bend and rapid of the river (there are 239 listed rapids) has a guardian, or kaitiaki, who maintains the mauri (life force) of that stretch of the river.

Whanganui hapū (sub-tribes) were renowned for their canoeing skills and maintained extensive networks of weirs and fishing traps along the river. Generations of river iwi have learned to use and protect this great taonga (treasure), and on 13 September 2012 the Whanganui River became the first river in the world to gain recognition as a legal identity.

Today the river and its surrounds are used for a number of recreational activities, including kayaking, jet boating, tramping, cycling and camping. A national cycleway has recently opened, which takes cyclists from the 'mountains to the sea'.

In the local government reorganisation of the 1980s, Wanganui District Council resulted from the amalgamation in 1989 of Wanganui County Council, most of Waitotara County Council, a small part of Stratford County Council, and Wanganui City Council. Hamish McDouall was elected mayor in the 2016 local government elections.

All but some 6,400 people in the Whanganui District live in the township itself, meaning there are few prominent outlying settlements. A small but notable village is Jerusalem, which was home to Mother Mary Joseph Aubert and the poet James K. Baxter.

The Whanganui District is also home to other settlements with small populations, including Kaitoke, Upokongaro, Kai Iwi/Mowhanau, Aberfeldy, Westmere, Pākaraka, Marybank, Okoia and Fordell.

== Culture ==
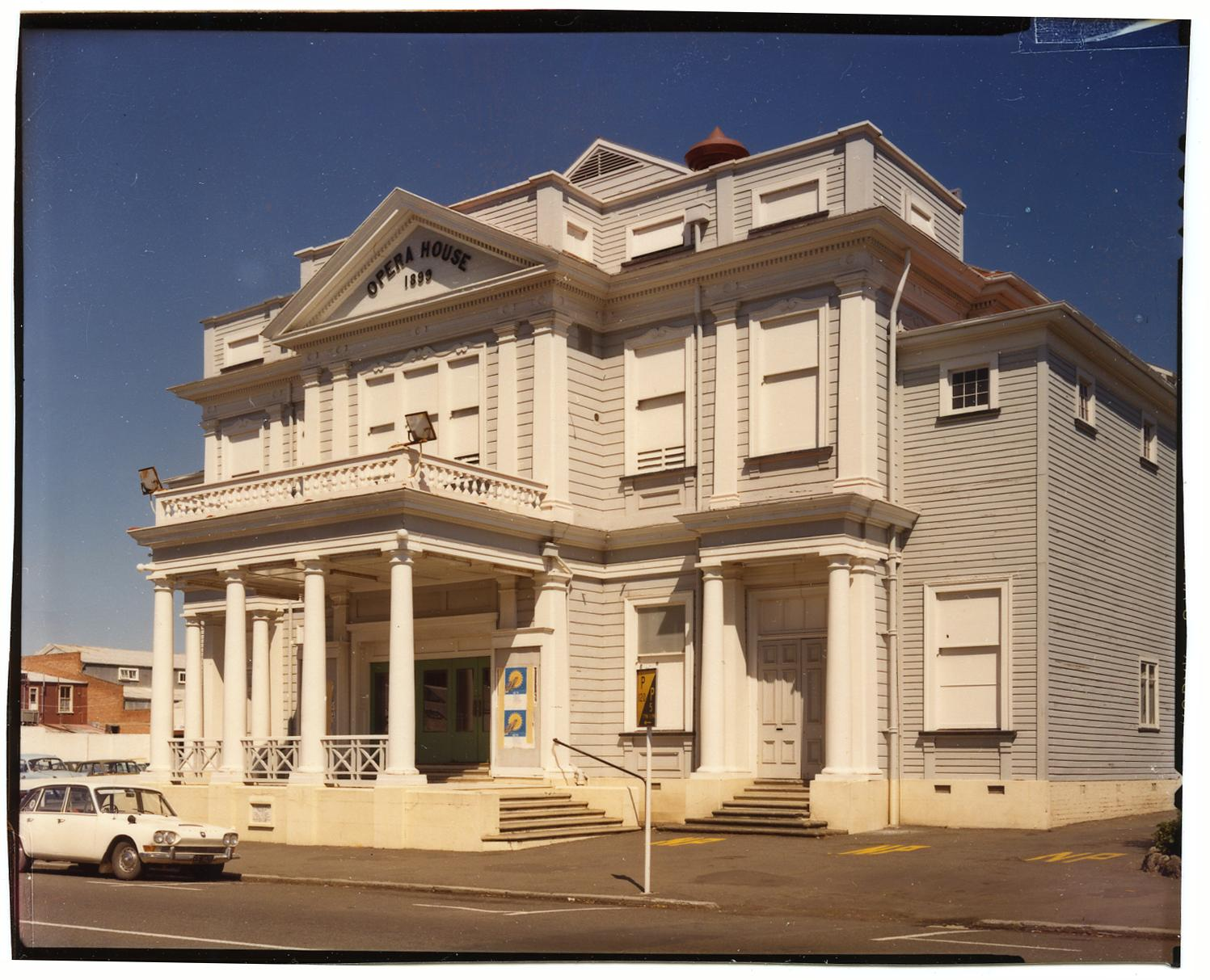
The Royal Whanganui Opera House, March 1967. The building, one of New Zealand's last Victorian theatres, still stands today.

=== Cultural institutions ===
Whanganui has a strong cultural and recreational focus. Queen's Park (Pukenamu) in the central township has several cultural institutions, including the Sarjeant Gallery, the Whanganui Regional Museum, the Davis Library, the Alexander Heritage and Research Library, and the Whanganui War Memorial Centre. Whanganui is home to New Zealand's only glass school and is renowned for its glass art.

=== Sarjeant Gallery collection ===
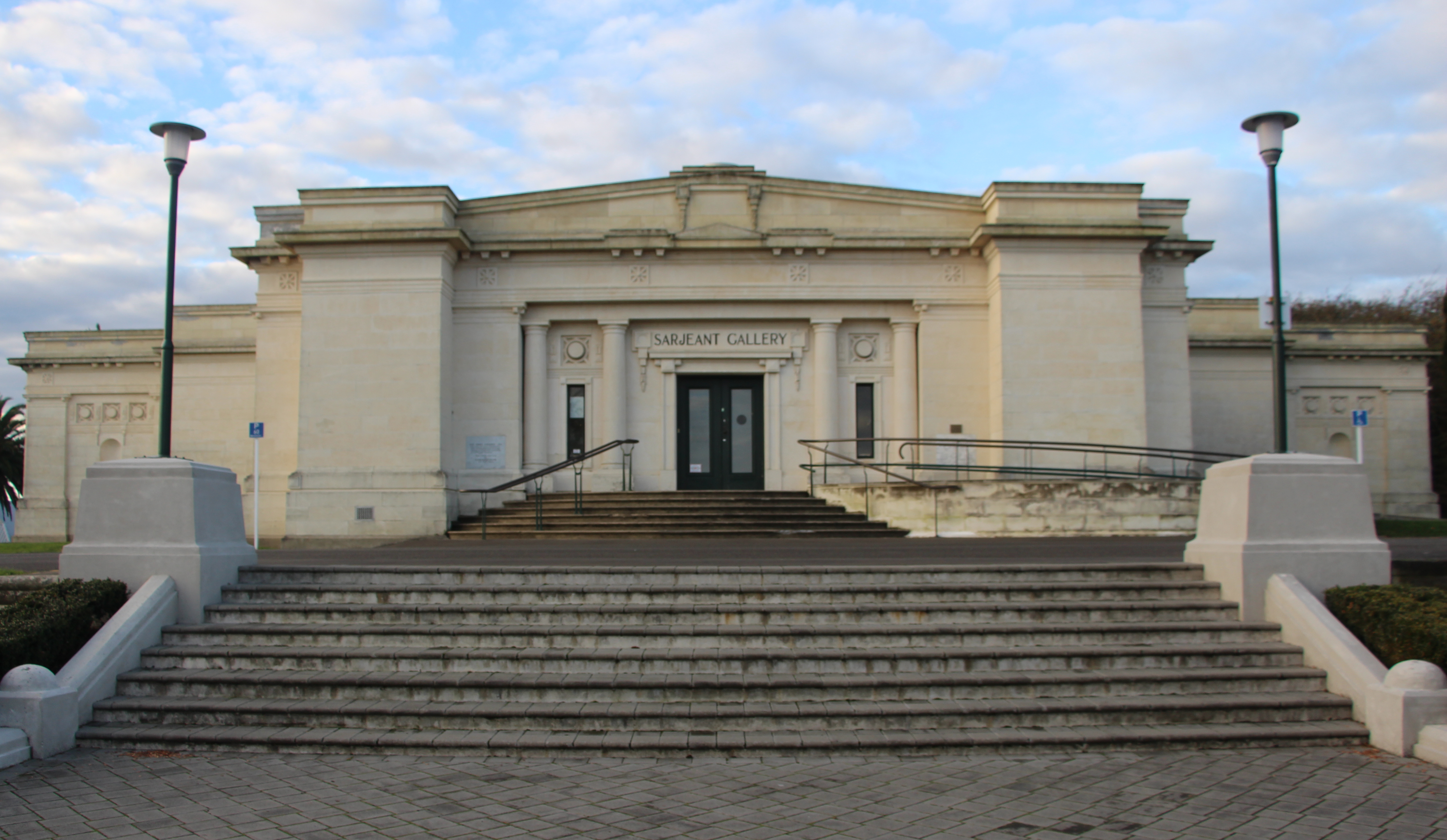
The Sarjeant Gallery Te Whare o Rehua Whanganui, an art gallery.

There are more than 8,000 artworks in the gallery, initially focused on 19th- and early 20th-century British and European art but, given the expansive terms of the will of benefactor Henry Sarjeant, the collection now spans the 16th century through to the 21st century. Among the collections are historic and modern works in all media – on paper, sculptures, pottery, ceramics and glass; bronze works; video art; and paintings by contemporary artists and old masters. The Gallery holds notable works by Edward Coley Burne-Jones, Domenico Piola, Frank Brangwyn, Bernardino Poccetti, Gaspard Dughet, William Richmond, William Etty, Lelio Orsi, Frederick Goodall, Augustus John and others. Its New Zealand holdings include six works by Wanganui artist Herbert Ivan Babbage and a major collection of works by the Whanganui-born Edith Collier.

=== Whanganui Regional Museum collection ===
The Whanganui Regional Museum collection has been growing since the first items were displayed in Samuel Henry Drew's shop window in Victoria Avenue. It includes artwork by John Tiffin Stewart.

=== Other arts ===
Potters have a long history of working in the area, such as Rick Rudd and Paul Rayner.

A repertory group has been active in the town since 1933.

Since 1994, The New Zealand Opera School has been hosted at Whanganui Collegiate School.

== Landmarks and buildings ==
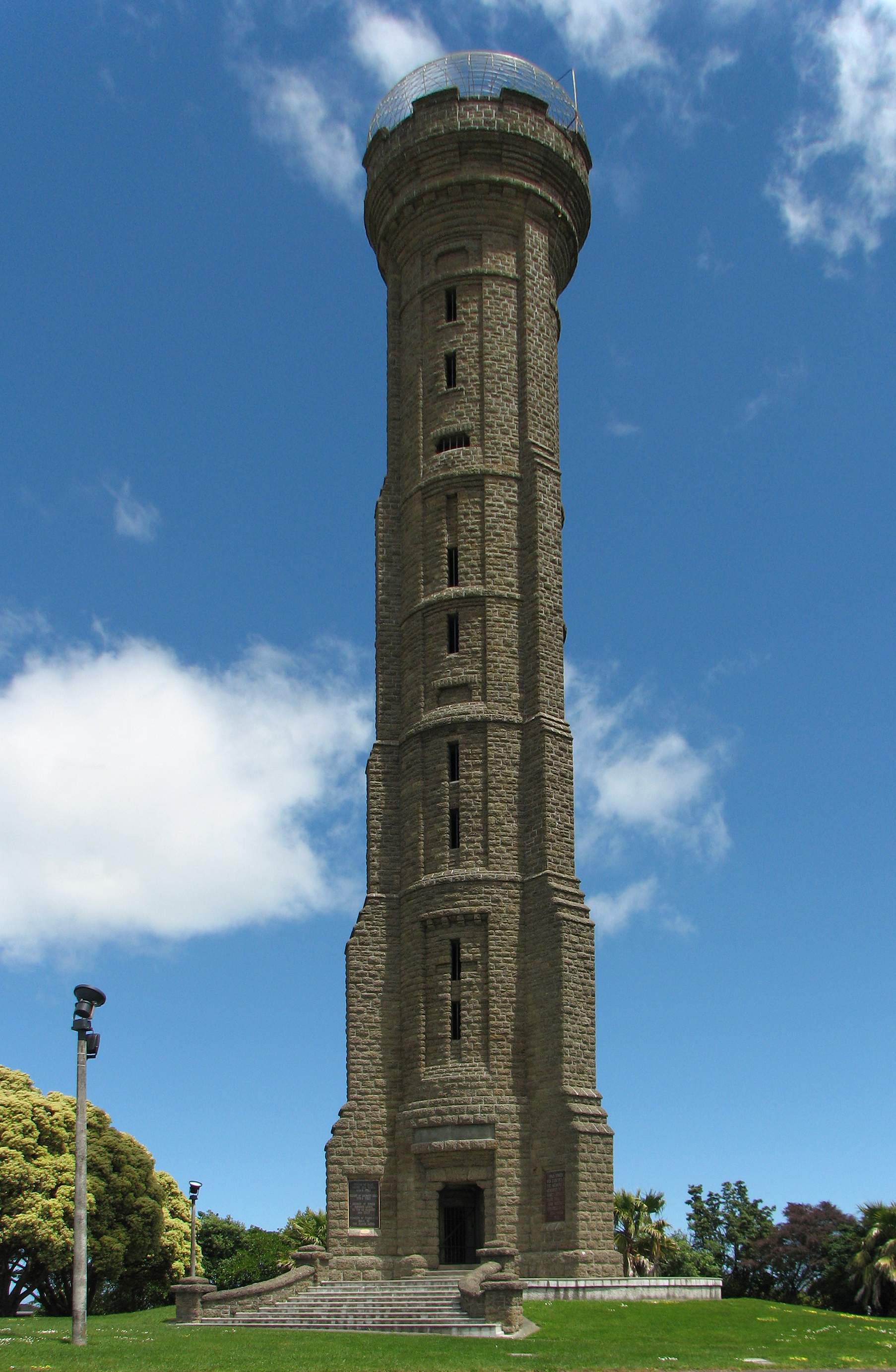
The War Memorial Tower on Durie Hill

Pukenamu–Queens Park in central Whanganui, formerly the hilltop location of the Rutland Stockade, is home to several iconic buildings. The Sarjeant Gallery, a Category I Historic Place, was a bequest to the town by local farmer Henry Sarjeant, and opened in 1919. Since 2014, it has been in temporary premises on Taupō Quay while the heritage building is strengthened and redeveloped. The Whanganui Regional Museum (1928) and the Alexander Heritage and Research Library (1933) were both bequests of the Alexander family. The award-winning Whanganui War Memorial Hall (1960) is one of New Zealand's finest examples of modernist architecture. Since 2021, UNESCO has designated Whanganui as a "Design City".

The Royal Whanganui Opera House is located in St Hill Street in central Whanganui.

Stewart House on the corner of Campbell and Plymouth Streets is now a private home, but it was formerly the Karitane Home and later a boarding residence for secondary school students. It was built for philanthropist John Tiffin Stewart and social activist Frances Ann Stewart.

There are two large towers overlooking Whanganui: the Durie Hill War Memorial Tower and the Bastia Hill Water Tower. The Durie Hill Tower is a World War I memorial, unveiled in 1926. Nearby is the Durie Hill Elevator (1919), which links the hilltop with Anzac Parade via a 66 m (217 ft) elevator and a 200 m (660 ft) tunnel. South of Whanganui is the Cameron Blockhouse.

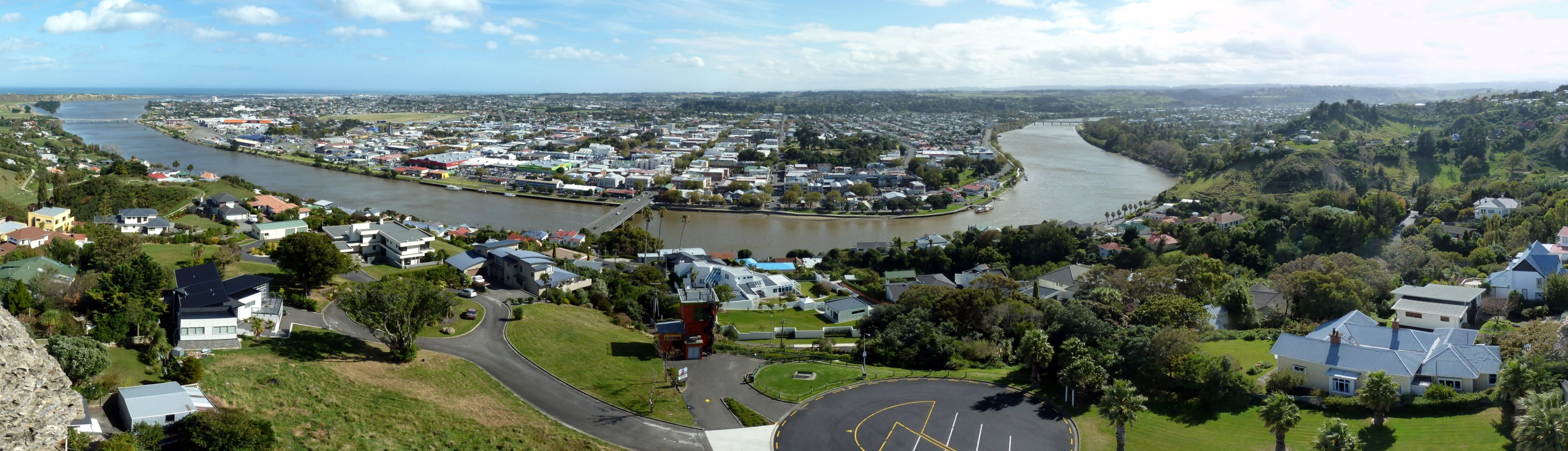
A panoramic view of Whanganui, New Zealand, from the top of the War Memorial Tower on Durie Hill. In the centre is Whanganui City Bridge.

Rotokawau Virginia Lake, located on St John's Hill, is a historic lake with a fountain, Art Deco conservatory and winter garden.

== Local attractions ==
=== Bason Botanic Gardens ===
These gardens are located 8 km (5.0 mi) northwest from Whanganui and are set on 25 ha (62 acres) in a relatively frost-free environment. They were founded in 1966 by Stanley and Blanche Bason who gave their farm to the city council for the purpose of creating a botanical reserve. The gardens have six themed areas, including one of the most extensive public-garden orchid collections in the country, and have been rated as a Garden of Significance by the New Zealand Gardens Trust.

=== Bushy Park Tarapuruhi ===
Bushy Park is a lowland rainforest remnant of approximately 100 ha (250 acres) located 8 km (5.0 mi) from Kai Iwi, north of Whanganui. It is a predator-free native bird sanctuary. The sanctuary is free to visit during daylight hours. The park also features an Edwardian-era homestead, which is a Category 1 heritage building registered with Heritage New Zealand.

== Social and religious history ==
=== Early institutions ===
- Karitane Hospital
- Wanganui Orphanage
- Alma Gardens

=== People, early recorders of social history ===
- Richard Taylor was one of the early missionaries and travelled widely through the region.
- William Tyrone Power
- Edward Jerningham Wakefield

=== Contemporary institutions ===
- The Society of St Pius X's main base of operations in New Zealand is in Whanganui.

== Sports ==
Sport team's colours
Blue

Black

Blue
Shorts/Skirt

=== Rugby ===
The Wanganui Rugby Football Union is one of the oldest rugby unions in New Zealand.

Wanganui has never held the country's top trophy, the Ranfurly Shield.

On 10 August 1966, a combined Wanganui and King Country team beat the British and Irish Lions 12 points to 6 at Spriggens Park.

In 2008, the Wanganui representative rugby team, under the captaincy of David Gower, won the NZRFU's Heartland Championship Meads Cup by defeating Mid Canterbury 27–12 in the final. They had previously been the defeated finalist in 2006 and 2007. The 2008 side had an undefeated season – the first since 1947. The rugby squad, including coach and management, was accorded the honour of 'Freedom of the City' by the Whanganui District Council – the first time the award had been given to any sporting team.

The 2009 representative team repeated this feat by regaining the Meads Cup – again defeating Mid Canterbury in the final by 34 points to 13 (after trailing nil-13 at halftime). Unlike 2008, the 2009 team did some lose games (to Wellington, Wairarapa Bush and Mid Canterbury) but came good at the business end of the season. Ten Whanganui players were selected for the New Zealand Heartland XV.

The Wanganui rugby jersey, due to its resemblance, is known as the butcher's apron.

The Whanganui environs have produced many All Blacks including:

- Moke Belliss (1920–23).
- John Blair (1897).
- George Bullock-Douglas (1932–34).
- Andrew Donald (1981–84).
- Keith Gudsell (1949). He also played three tests for the Wallabies.
- Andy Haden (1972–85).
- Peter Henderson (1949–50).
- John Hogan (1907). He also played for New Zealand at rugby league (1913) and was a national waterpolo champion.
- Peter Arthur Johns (1968).
- Peter McDonnell (1896).
- Alasdair "Sandy" McNicol (1973).
- Henare "Buff" Milner (1970).
- Peter Murray (1908).
- Bill Osborne (1975–82).
- Glen Osborne (1995–99).
- Waate "Pat" Potaka (1923).
- Harrison Rowley (1949).
- Peina Taituha also known as Taituha Peina Kingi (1923).
- Hector "Mona" Thomson (1905–08).

Although from the Manawatū, 1987 Rugby World Cup winning All Black Captain David Kirk was a student at Wanganui Collegiate School.

=== Athletics ===
Whanganui has several high-quality sporting venues including Cooks Gardens, a major sporting venue used for cricket, athletics and rugby. On 27 January 1962, a world record time of 3 minutes 54.4 seconds for running the mile was set by Peter Snell on the grass track at the gardens. The venue also has a world-class velodrome. Local football club Whanganui Athletic FC hosts their premier men's and women's teams in the brand new Wembley Park clubrooms, a $2.4 million dollar venture completed in 2025

=== Motor-racing ===
The Cemetery Circuit is a temporary motorcycle street racetrack in downtown Whanganui which passes through the old cemetery and industrial area near to the centre of town. The event is usually held on Boxing Day each year.

Rod Coleman was a Grand Prix motorcycle road racer.

Earl Bamber is a racing driver for Cadillac Racing and winner of the 2015 24 Hours of Le Mans and 2014 Porsche Supercup.

=== Horse racing ===
The Wanganui Jockey Club operates at the Wanganui Racecourse, Purnell Street, where it has been since 1848, said to be the oldest racing club In New Zealand still operating on its original land.

Important races held include the:

- Ag Challenge Stakes.
- H S Dyke Wanganui Guineas.
- Fillies Series.
- Wanganui Cup.

New Zealand Racing Hall of Fame and Australian Racing Hall of Fame jockey Brent Thomson was born and started his career in Wanganui.

The Wanganui Trotting Club now holds meetings at the Palmerston North track.

== Infrastructure ==
=== Transport ===
Whanganui Airport is served by Air Chathams with flights to Auckland.

Horizons Regional Council, under their Go! brand, contracts ten weekday urban bus routes within the city and a Saturday route which combines parts of four of the routes to serve the northern part of the city. From 18 February 2023 a 'frequent' (20-minute interval, except Sunday) bus links Castlecliff and Aramoho, though most routes are 2-hourly. The regional council also runs commuter buses to Palmerston North, and monthly buses from Taihape. The services are all operated by Tranzit Group. Go cards were replaced by Bee Cards in December 2019.

Whanganui had trams between Aramoho and Castlecliff from 1908 to 1950, when they were replaced by Greyhound buses. Greyhound was taken over by Tranzit in 1995.

The township was also served by three stations and a passenger rail train running to New Plymouth until this was cancelled in July 1977. Today the line is used for freight.

=== Energy ===
The Wanganui-Rangitikei Electric Power Board was established in 1921 to supply the city and surrounding areas with electricity. The city was connected to Mangahao hydroelectric scheme on 23 April 1926, following the completion of the transmission line from Bunnythorpe to Whanganui and the Whanganui substation. The Energy Companies Act 1992 saw the power board corporatise and merge with the New Plymouth Municipal Electricity Department and the Taranaki Electric Power Board to become Powerco. Powerco sold its retail base to Genesis Energy as part of the 1998 electricity sector reforms and continued as an electricity distribution business.

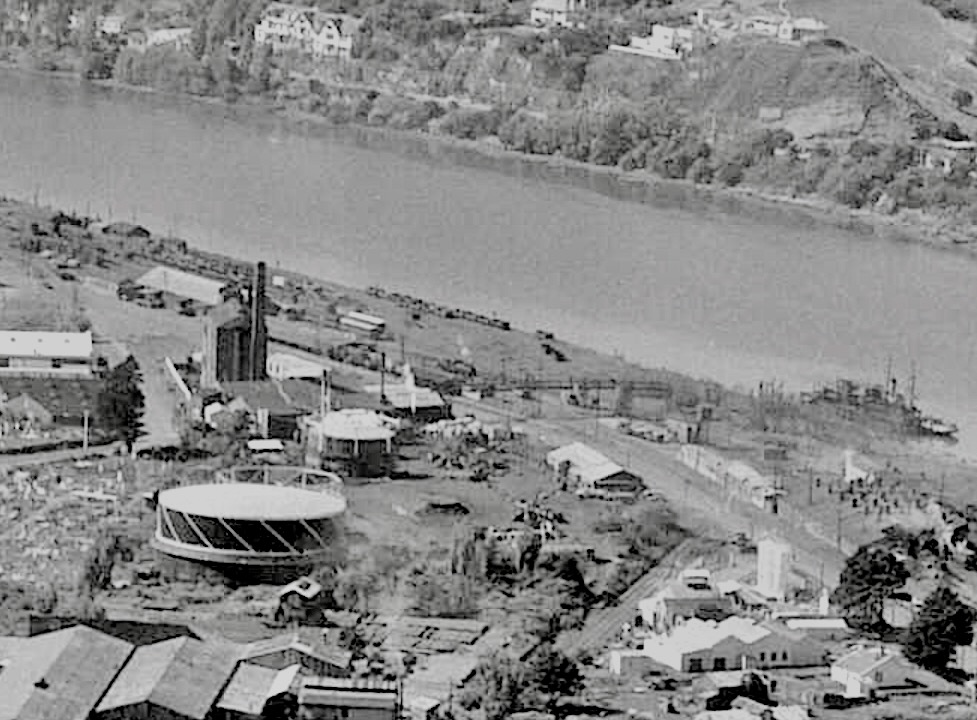
Whanganui gas works, showing a collier at the jetty, the coal conveyor, works and gas holders in 1955

Whanganui was one of the original nine towns and cities in New Zealand to be supplied with natural gas when the Kapuni gas field entered production in 1970 and a 260 km high-pressure pipeline from Kapuni to Wellington via the city was completed. The high-pressure transmission pipelines supplying the city are now owned and operated by First Gas, with GasNet owning and operating the medium and low-pressure distribution pipelines within the city.

Whanganui was first supplied with piped gas in March 1879. Coal was shipped from Greymouth, or Westport.

=== Water ===
Whanganui had a mains water supply from Rotokawau Virginia Lake from 1876. From 1904 water was piped from the upper Okehu valley. In 1933 springs at Kai Iwi were used to supplement the supply. Water now comes from artesian bores at Kai Iwi and Aramoho.

== Education ==
- Whanganui Collegiate School is in Liverpool Street, central Whanganui. It was founded by a land grant in 1852 by the Governor of New Zealand, Sir George Grey, to the Bishop of New Zealand, George Augustus Selwyn, for the purpose of establishing a school. It was originally a boys-only school, but in 1991 began admitting girls at senior levels and went fully co-educational in 1999. The school celebrated its 150th anniversary in 2004. The school amalgamated with St George's School in 2010. The combined schools provide primary education for day students on the St George campus, and secondary education for day and boarding students on the Collegiate campus. Prince Edward, Duke of Edinburgh, spent two terms spanning 1982 and 1983 at the school as a junior master during his gap year.
- Whanganui City College is located in Ingestre Street, central Whanganui, and has had three names. Wanganui Technical College, established in 1911, became Wanganui Boys' College in 1964 and in 1994 it became Wanganui City College.
- Whanganui High School is in Purnell Street.
- Whanganui Girls' College is in Jones Street, Whanganui East, near the Dublin Street Bridge.
- Cullinane College is an integrated, co-educational college in Peat Street, Aramoho.
- St. Dominic's College is in York Street, Gonville.
- Te Kura Kaupapa Māori o Te Atihaunui-A-Paparangi is in Anaua Street, Putiki.
- Te Kura o Kokohuia is in Matipo Street, Castlecliff.
- Te Kura Kaupapa Māori o Tupoho is in Cross Street, Castlecliff.
- UCOL, Universal College of Learning, was founded in 1907 and was known as the Palmerston North Technical School. In 1971 it became the Palmerston North Technical Institute and in 1983 the Manawatu Polytechnic. At the time it specialised in trade apprenticeship courses, and in hobby, art, and craft classes, along with a range of night school programmes in business studies for working adults. UCOL expanded in January 2001 with the incorporation of the Wairarapa Regional Polytechnic and the integration of the Whanganui Regional Community Polytechnic on 1 April 2002.
- The Wanganui Regional Community Polytechnic is now called Whanganui UCOL and incorporates the Wanganui School of Design.

== Media ==
Whanganui has three local newspapers. Whanganui was the first town in the wider Wellington region to have its own newspaper, the Wanganui Record, which was first published in 1853. The Whanganui Chronicle, founded in 1856, is New Zealand's oldest newspaper, and has been a daily paper since 1871. Its rival from the 1860s onward was the Evening Herald (later the Wanganui Herald), founded by John Ballance. Initially, the production of the Wanganui Chronicle was held back by a lack of equipment, meaning the first issue, dated 18 September 1856, was produced on a makeshift press, made by staff and pupils at the local industrial school. Shortly afterwards, the founder, Henry Stokes, imported a press from Sydney. The two daily papers joined in the 1970s, and in 1986 the Herald became a free weekly, later renamed the Wanganui Midweek. The River City Press is the other free weekly paper.

Local radio coverage in Whanganui began on 22 October 1949 with the launch of station 2XA on 1200 AM. The station later became 2ZW and moved to 1197 AM then River City FM when it began broadcasting on 89.6 FM in 1993. Today, the 89.6 FM frequency is used by The Hits, and the 1197 AM is used by Newstalk ZB. In 1996, Whanganui briefly rose to international infamy when a man who claimed to be carrying a bomb held local radio station Star FM (now More FM Whanganui) hostage and demanded that the station broadcast The Muppets song "The Rainbow Connection" for 12 hours. Today, Whanganui is served by 25 radio stations: 22 on FM and three on AM.

Television coverage reached Whanganui in 1963, after the Wharite Peak transmitter near Palmerston North was commissioned to relay Wellington's WNTV1 channel. Due to terrain blocking the Wharite signal to parts of the city, coverage was supplemented by a translator at Mount Jowett in Aramoho. Today, digital terrestrial television (Freeview) is available in the city from both Wharite and Mount Jowett.

== Notable people ==
- Israel Adesanya (born 1989), mixed martial artist
- Asteria (Matthew James Joines, born 2006), singer and musician
- Sister Mary Joseph Aubert (1835–1926), founder of Our Lady of Compassion at Jerusalem
- Harriet Austin (born 1988), rower who rowed 200 miles across the Mediterranean
- Ellen Ballance (1846–1935), suffragist and community worker
- John Ballance (1839–1893), politician and businessman
- Earl Bamber, racing driver
- Airini Beautrais, poet
- Annie Maude Blackett, librarian
- Ruka Broughton (1940–1986), tohunga, Anglican priest and university lecturer
- John Bryce, politician
- Brit Bunkley, artist
- Paul Callaghan, physicist
- Edith Collier, artist
- Nathan Dahlberg, racing cyclist and team manager
- Johnny Devlin, musician
- Samuel Henry Drew, jeweller and founder of the Whanganui Regional Museum
- Dave Feickert, international mines safety advisor
- Henry Augustus Field, surveyor
- Janet Gillies, nurse
- Peter Gordon, International chef and restaurant owner
- Michael Laws, former mayor
- Douglas Lilburn, composer
- Te Mamaku, Māori chief
- Lucas Martin, race walker
- Robert Martin, disability rights activist
- Jerry Mateparae, former Chief of the New Zealand Defence Force and Governor General of New Zealand
- Pura McGregor, community leader
- Christodoulos Moisa, poet, writer, and art teacher
- Peter Nicholls, sculptor
- Anne Noble, photographer
- Ray O'Leary, comedian
- Simon Owen, professional golfer, the 1976 International Double Diamond individual golf champion and winner of 17 tournaments around the world
- Brian Perkins, broadcaster and musician
- Victoria Ransom, software entrepreneur
- Paul Rayner, artist
- Iriaka Rātana, first woman to represent Māori in New Zealand parliament
- Herbert Reeve, Vicar of Wanganui 1911 to 1924
- Emma Rainey, field hockey player
- Helen Rockel, painter
- Henry Sarjeant, farmer and benefactor of the Sarjeant Art Gallery
- Tim Seifert, cricketer
- Maxwell James Grant Smart, farmer, museum director, historian, archaeologist and writer
- Frances Ann Stewart, social activist
- John Tiffin Stewart, engineer, artist and philanthropist
- Brian Talboys, politician
- Richard Taylor, early missionary at Putiki
- James Allen Ward, Victoria Cross recipient
- Emily White, gardener and writer
- Jane Winstone, aviator

== Sister cities ==
Whanganui has two sister cities, as designated by Sister Cities International:

- Toowoomba, Queensland, Australia since 1983
- Nagaizumi, Shizuoka, Japan since 1988

The Wanganui District Council decided in 2008 to formally end its sister city relationship with Reno, Nevada, United States, after years of inactivity. The relationship was parodied on "The Prefect of Wanganui" episode of Reno 911!.

== Image gallery ==
Whanganui

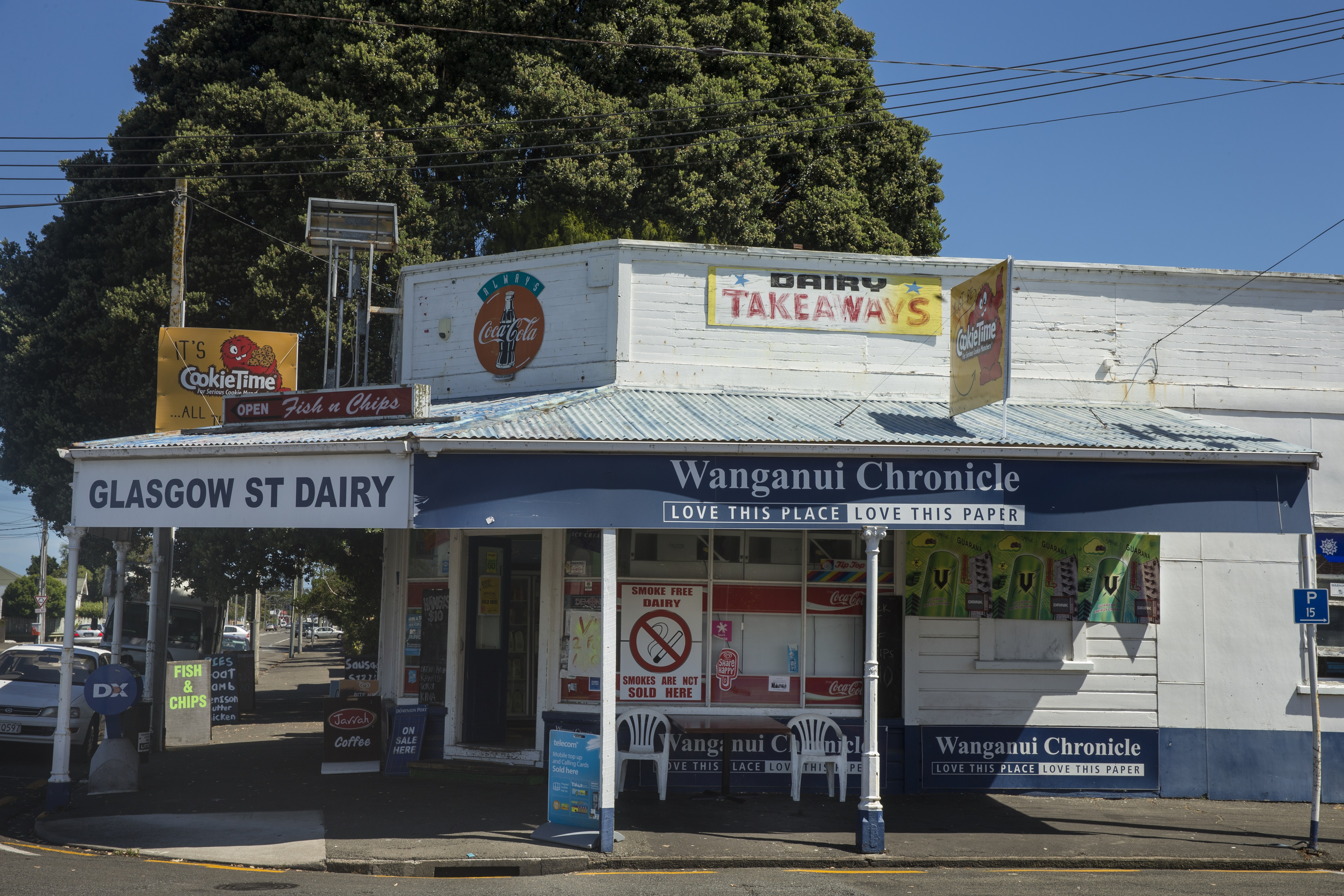
Glasgow Street Dairy

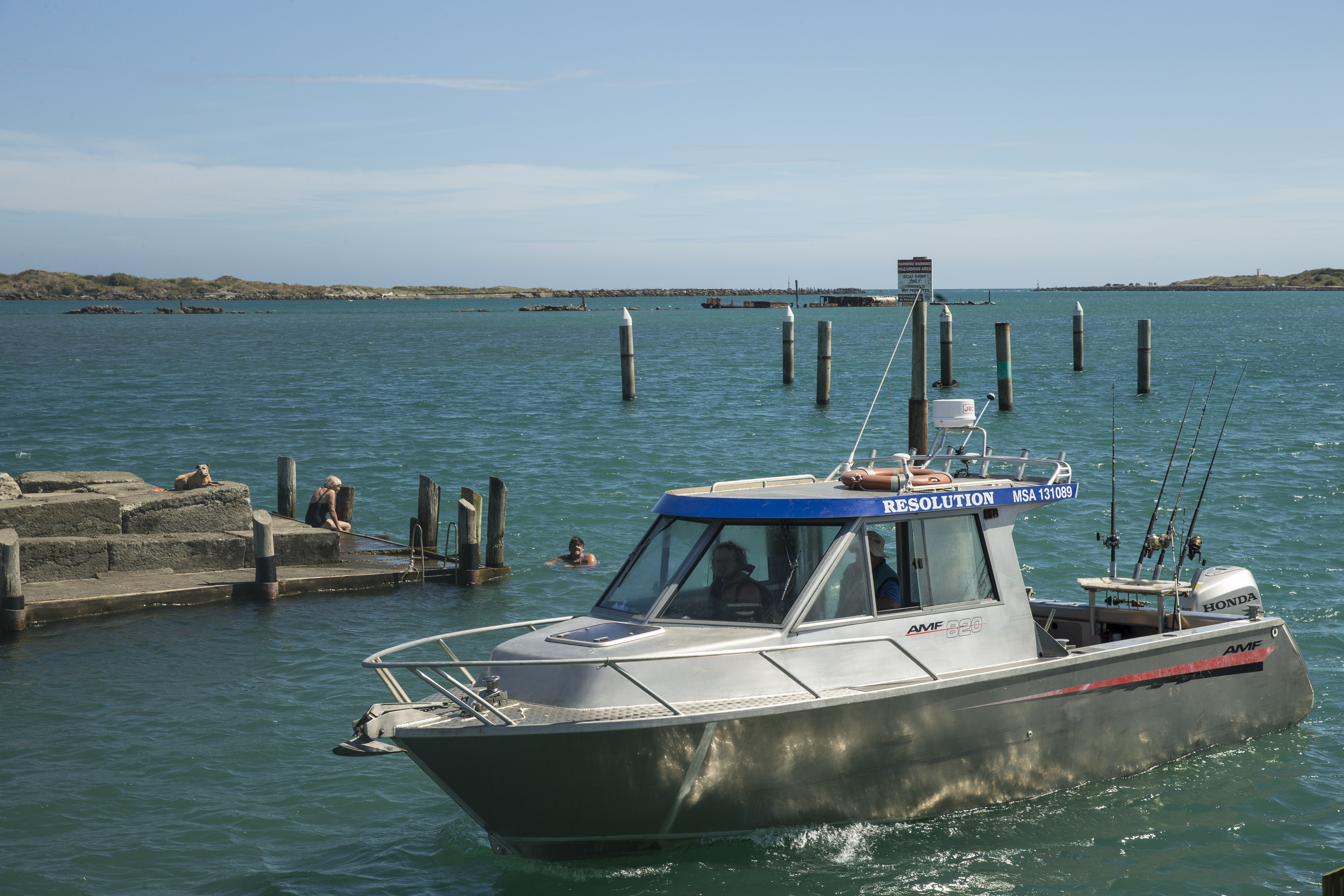
Whanganui River mouth, boat and swimmers

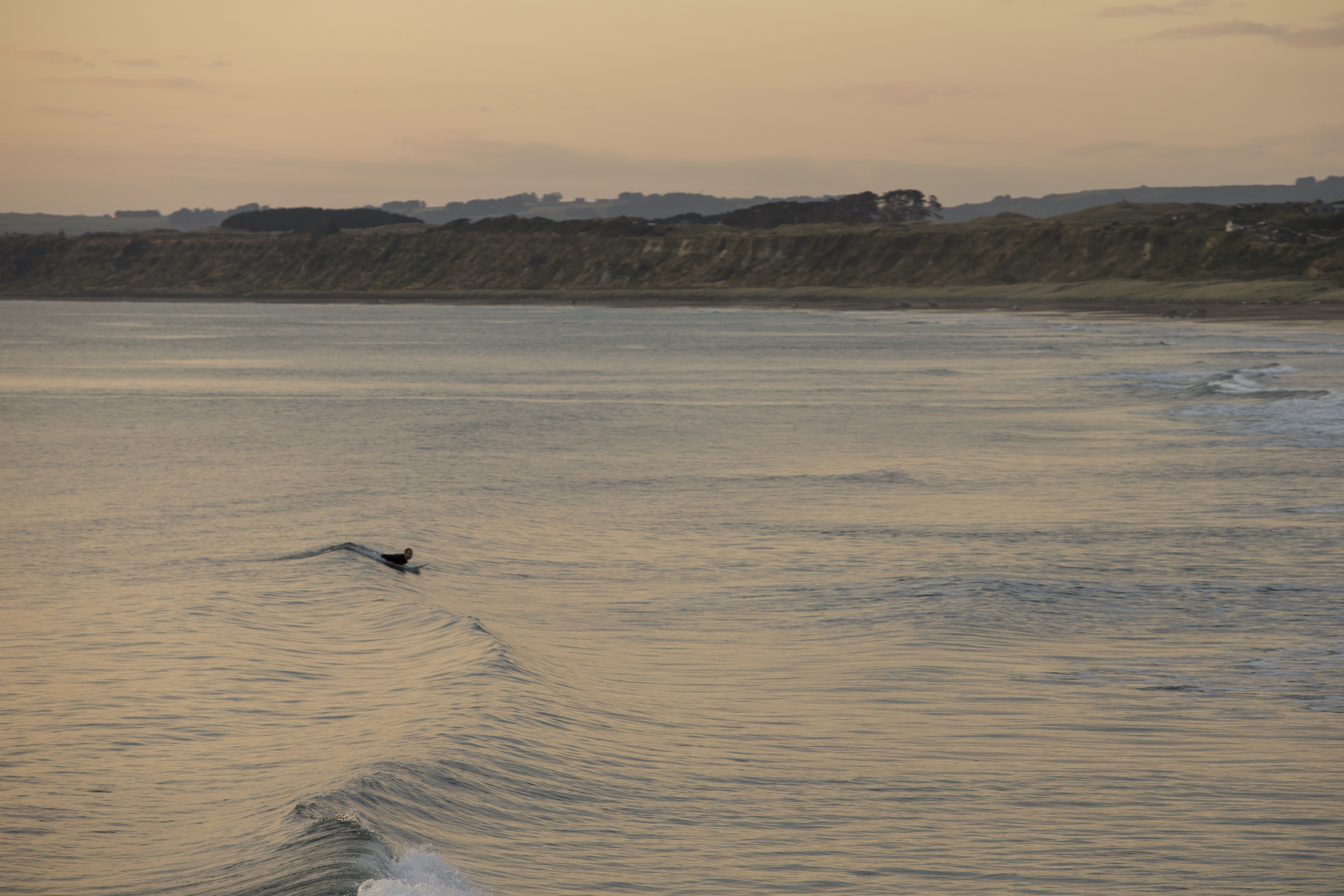
Surfer at Castlecliff Beach

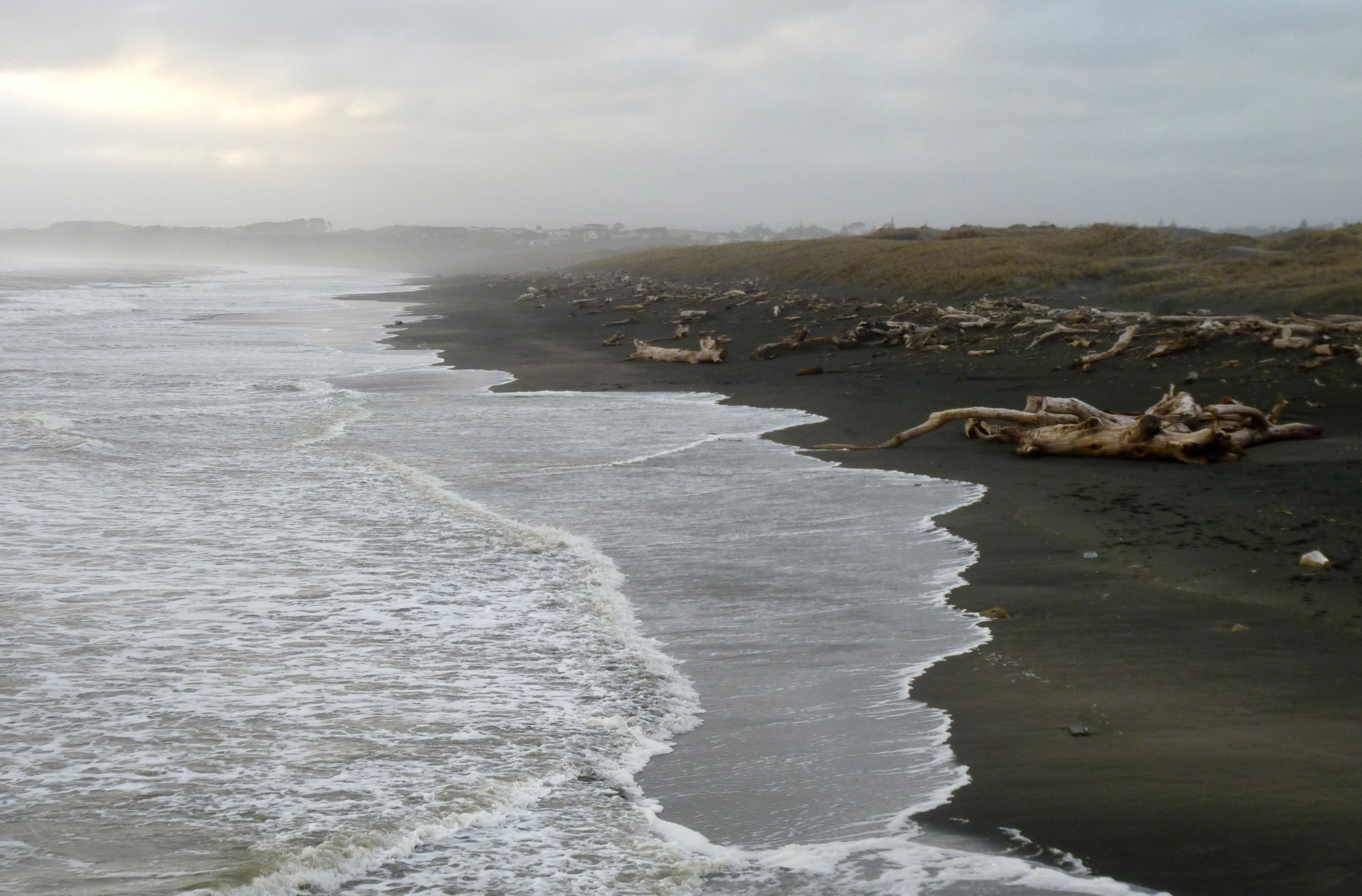
Beach, Whanganui

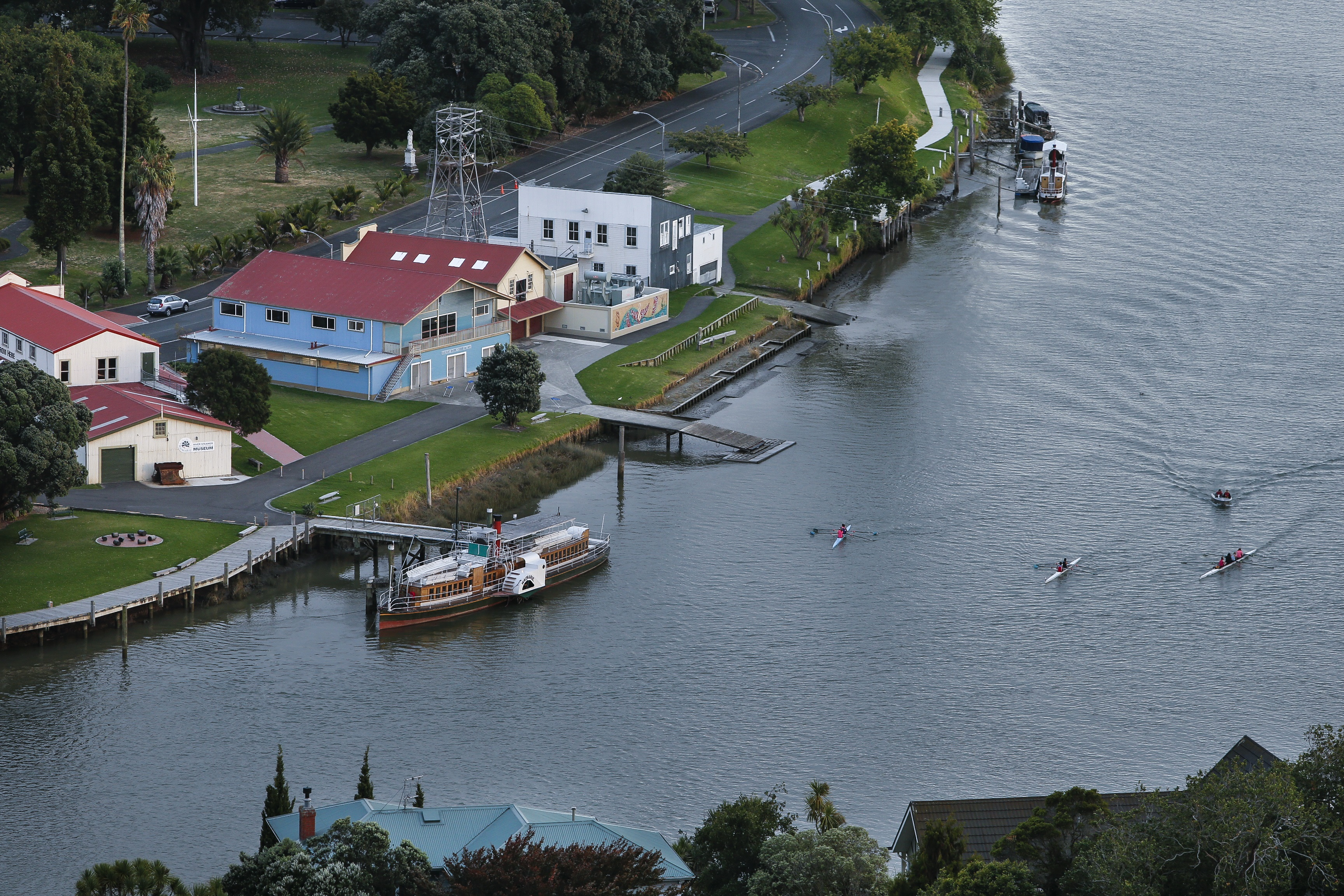
Waimarie paddle steamer and rowers on the Whanganui River

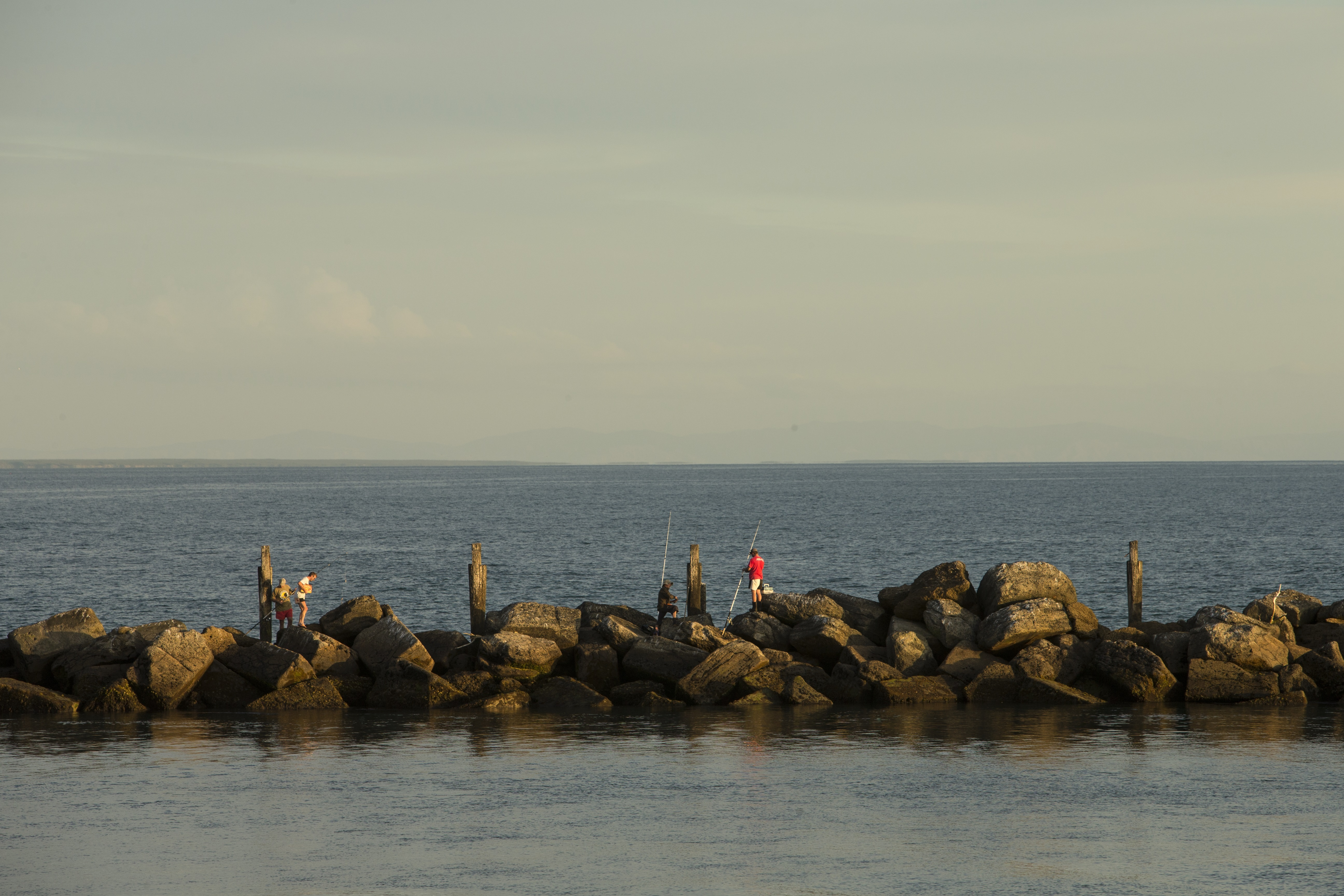
Fishers at South Mole

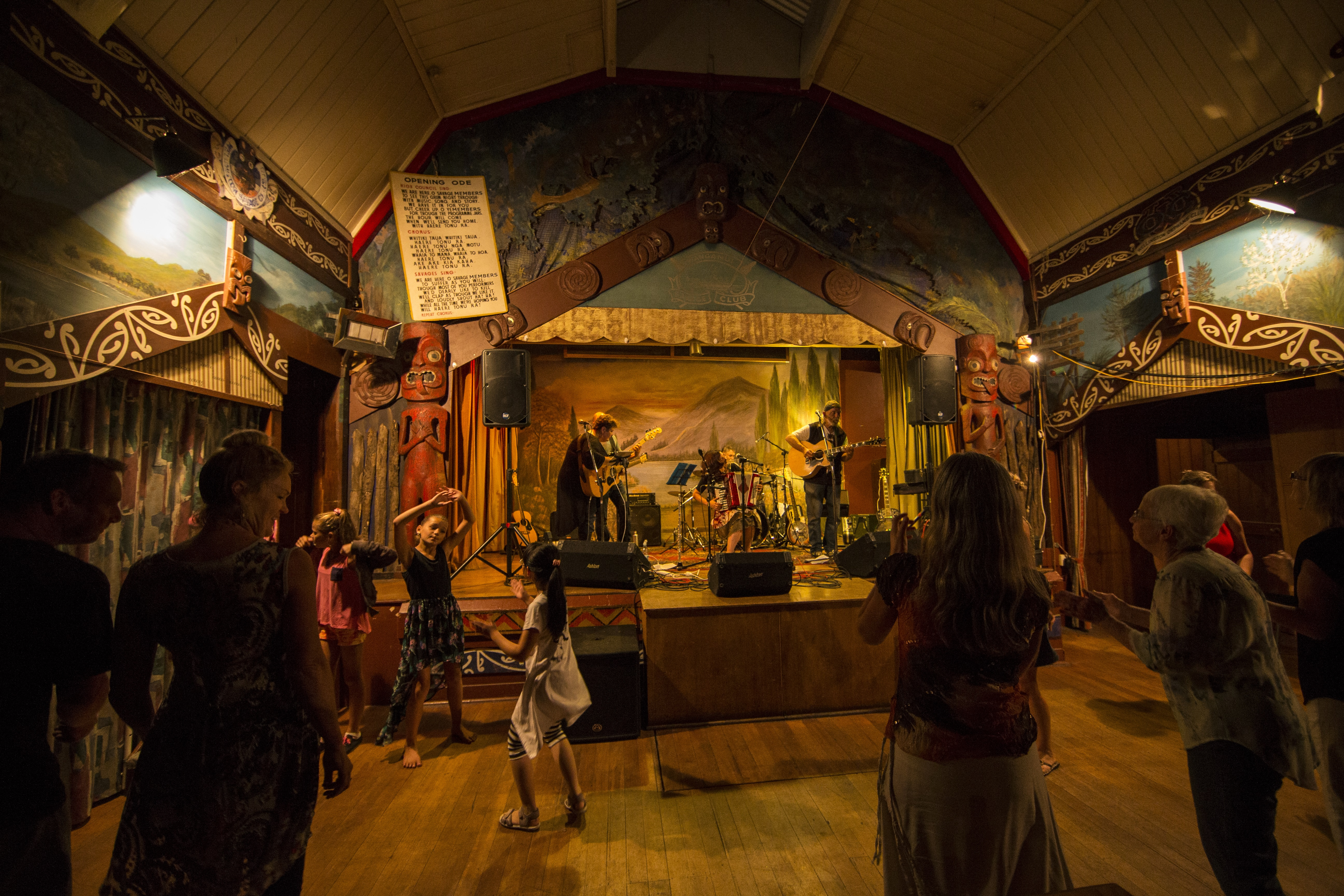
Whanganui Musicians Club at the Old Savage Club

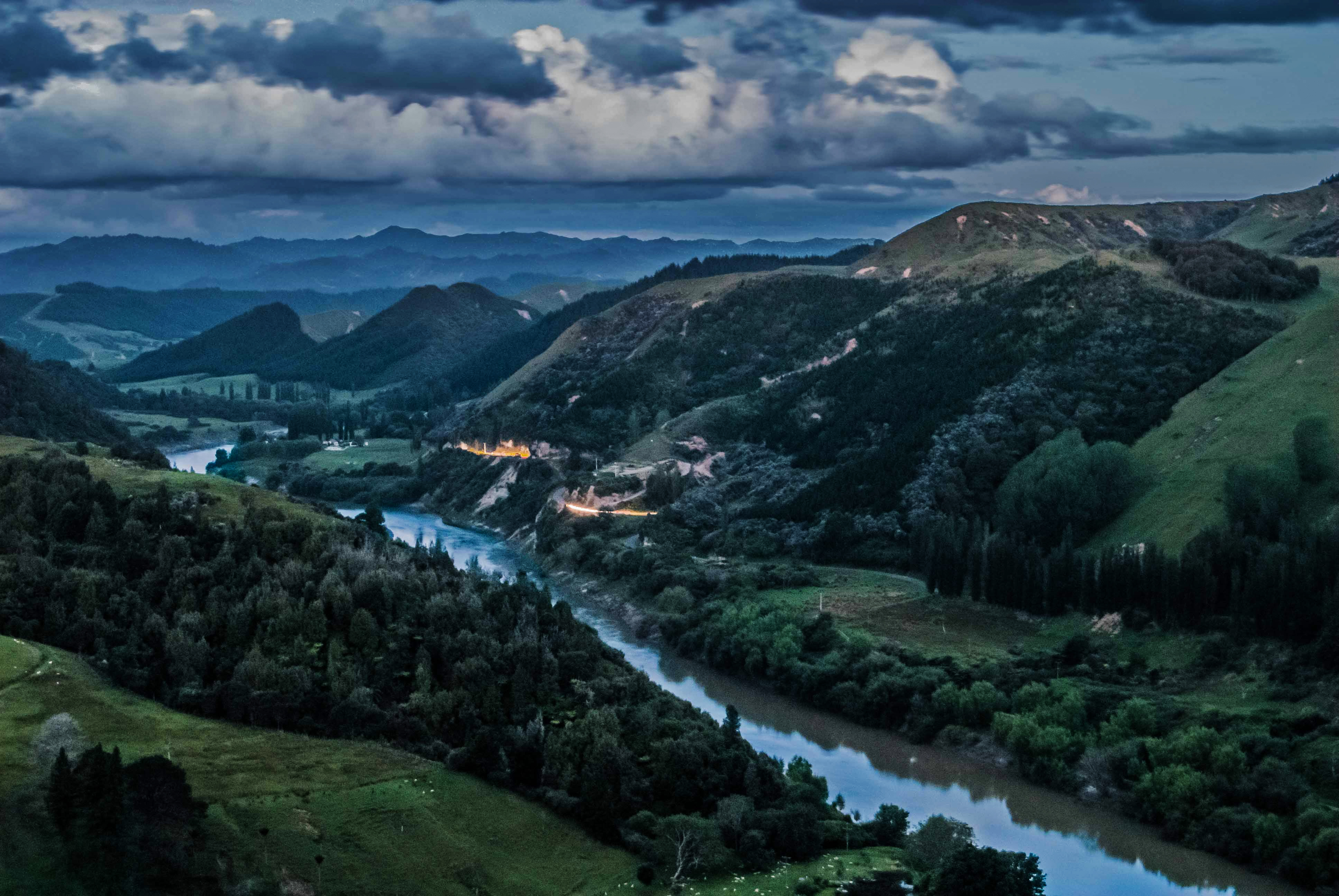
Along the river road

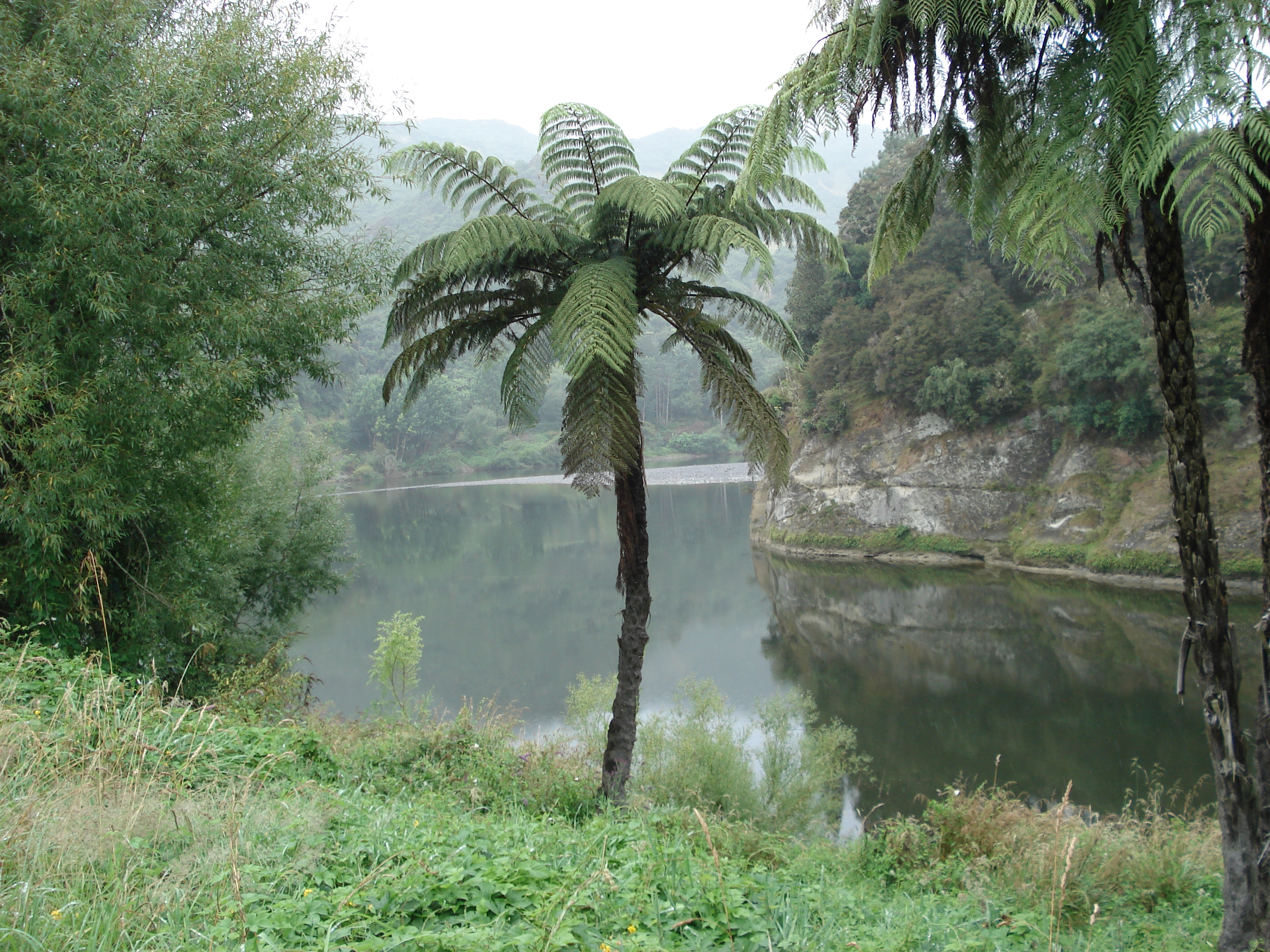
Upriver near Jerusalem (Hiruhārama)

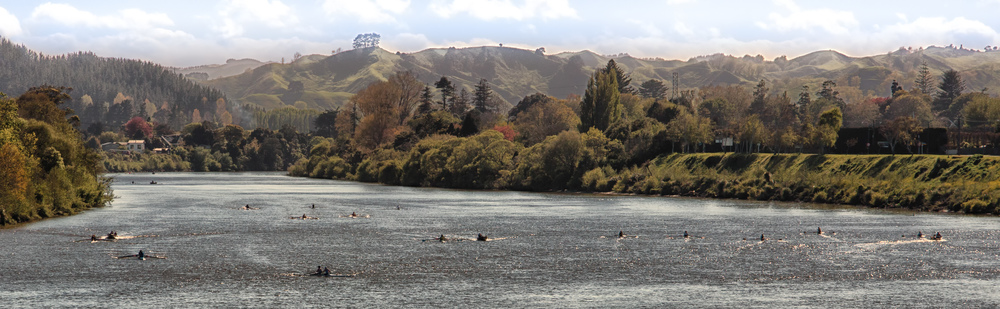
River scene

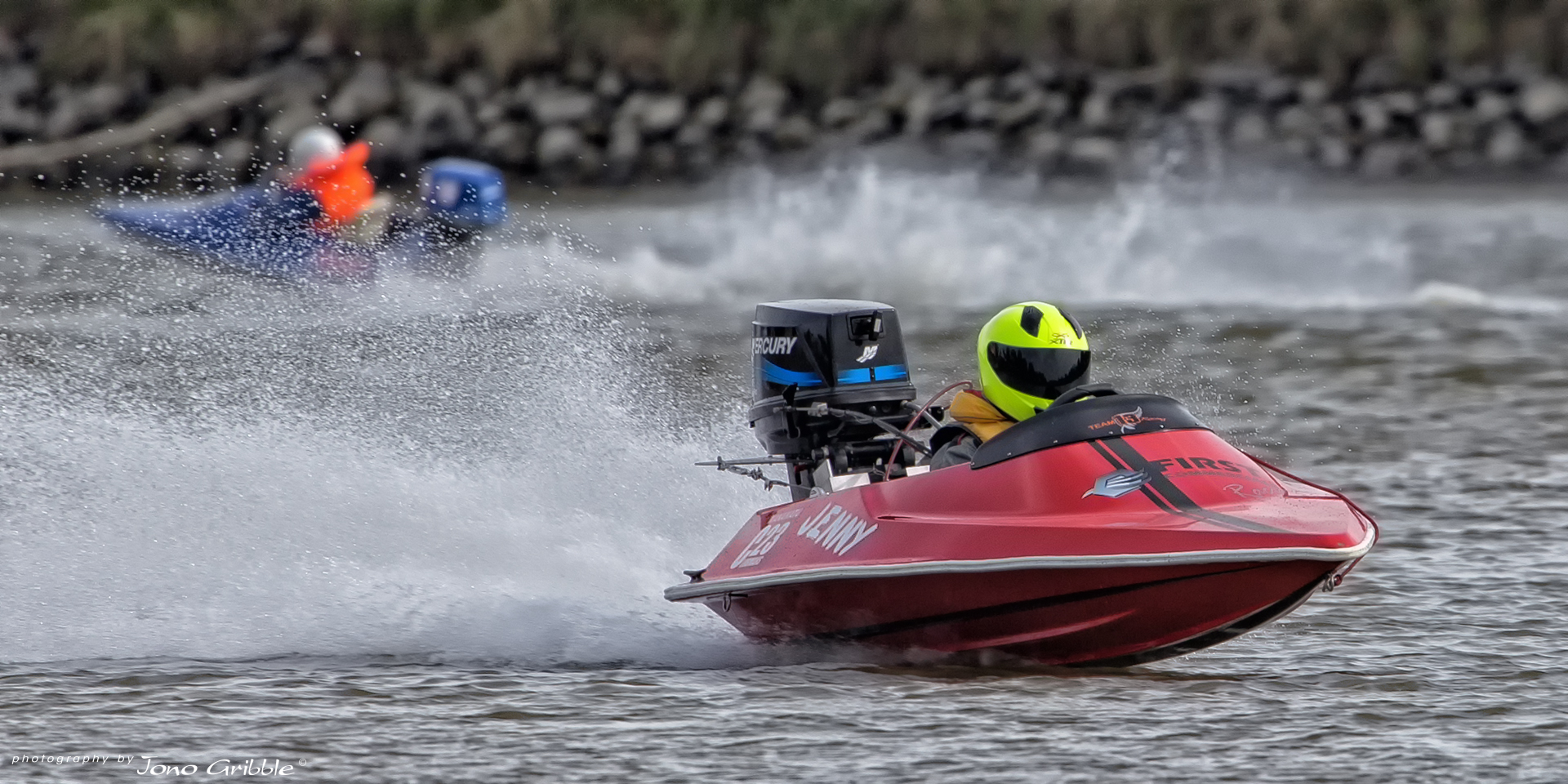
Hydroplanes on the river

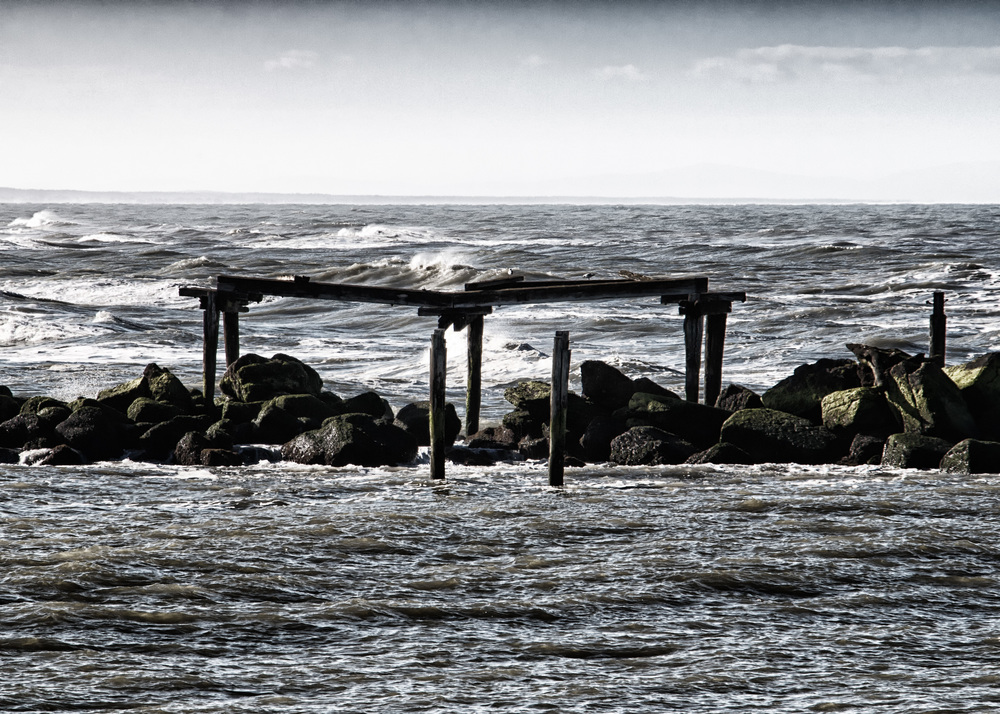
Fragile river

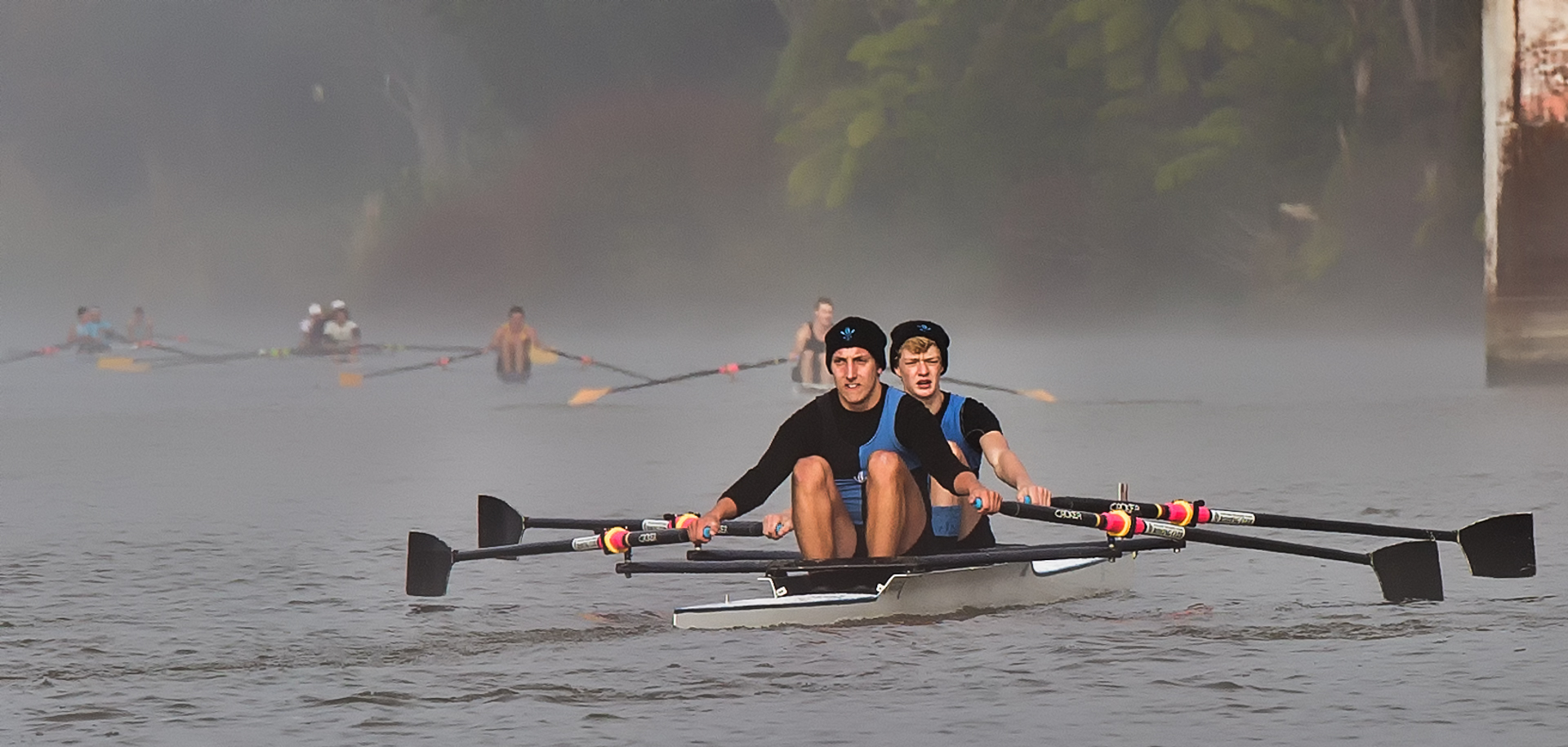
Rowers on the river

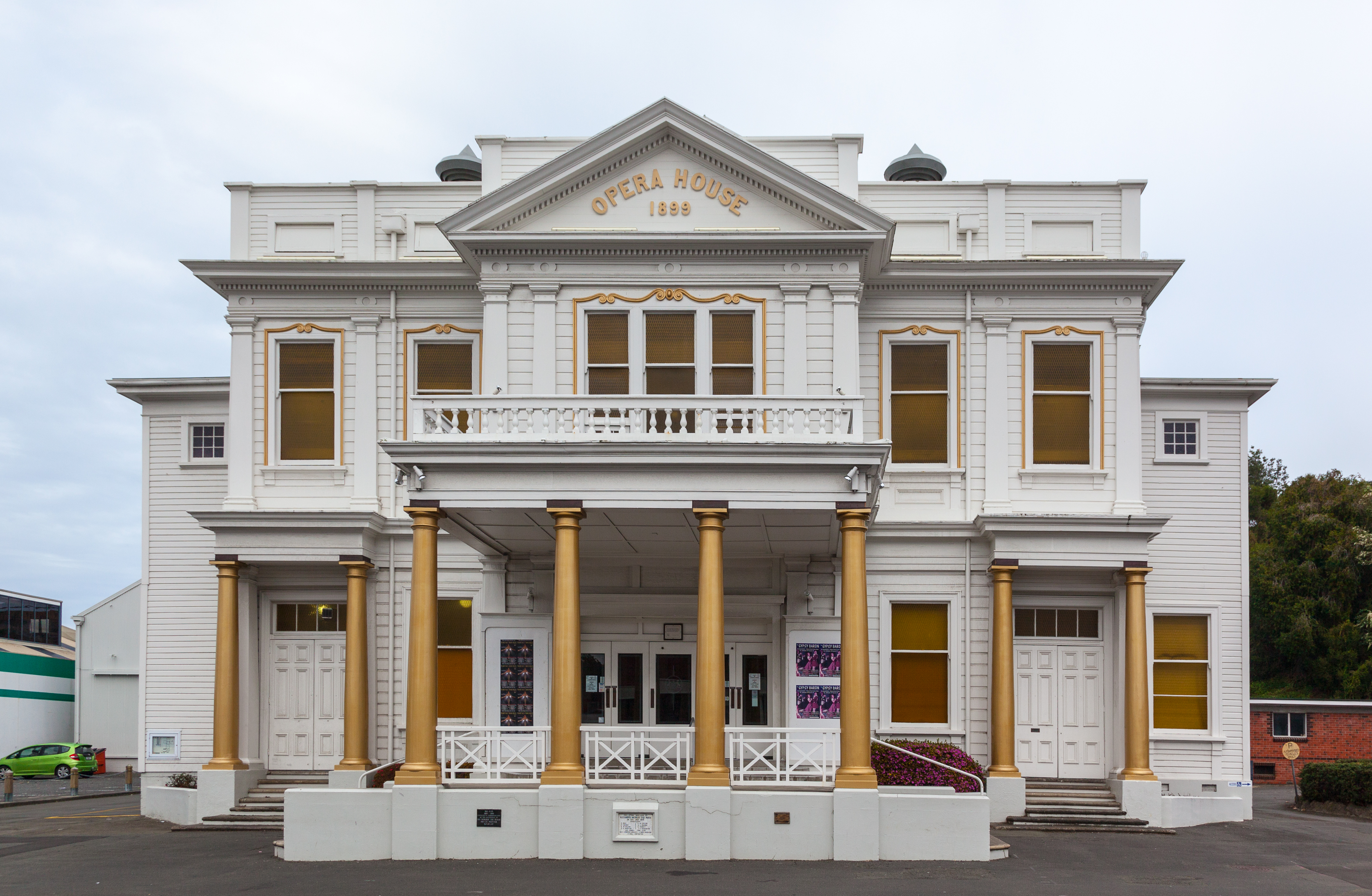
The Royal Wanganui Opera House in 2013

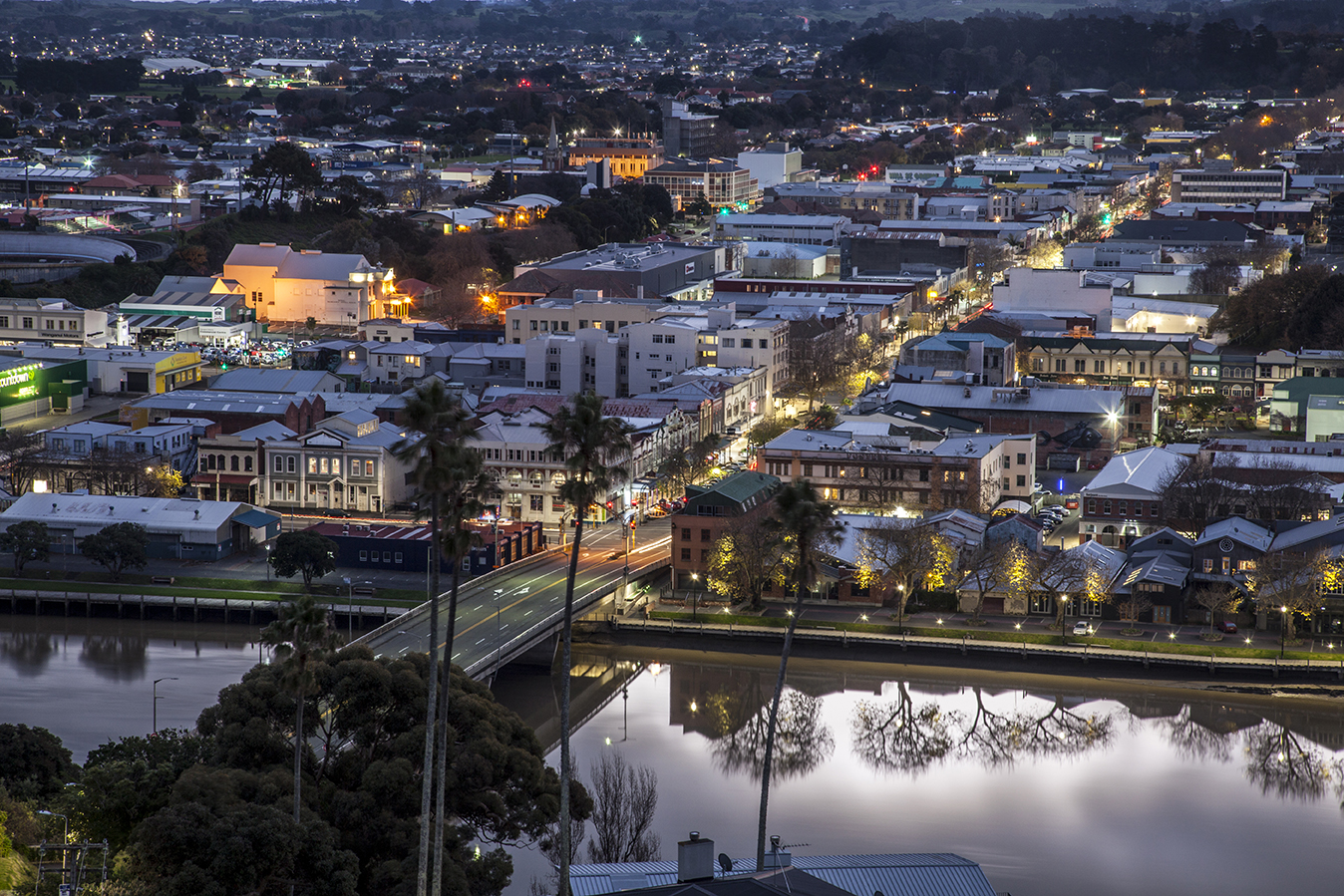
From Durie Hill at night

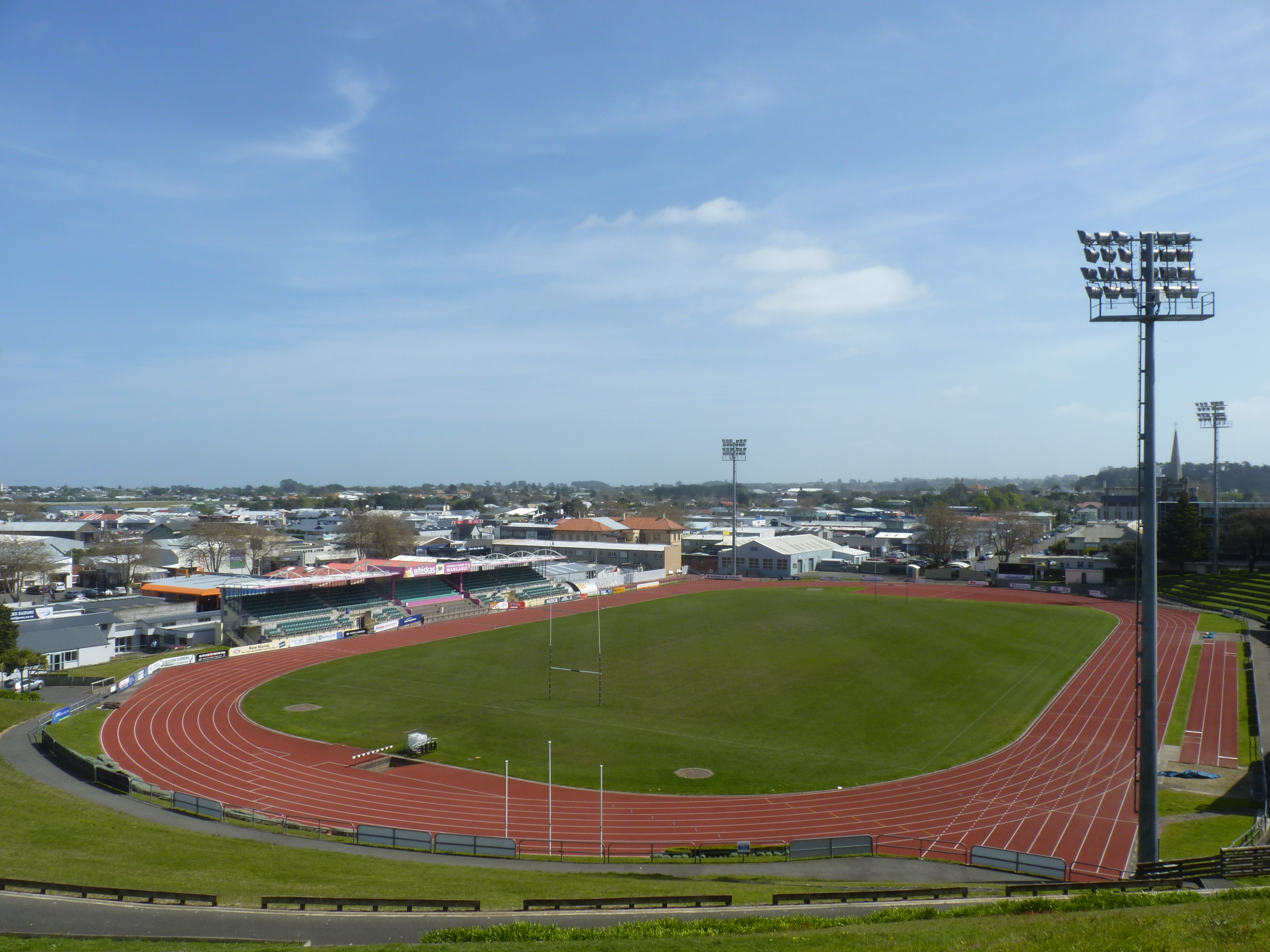
Cooks Garden Whanganui

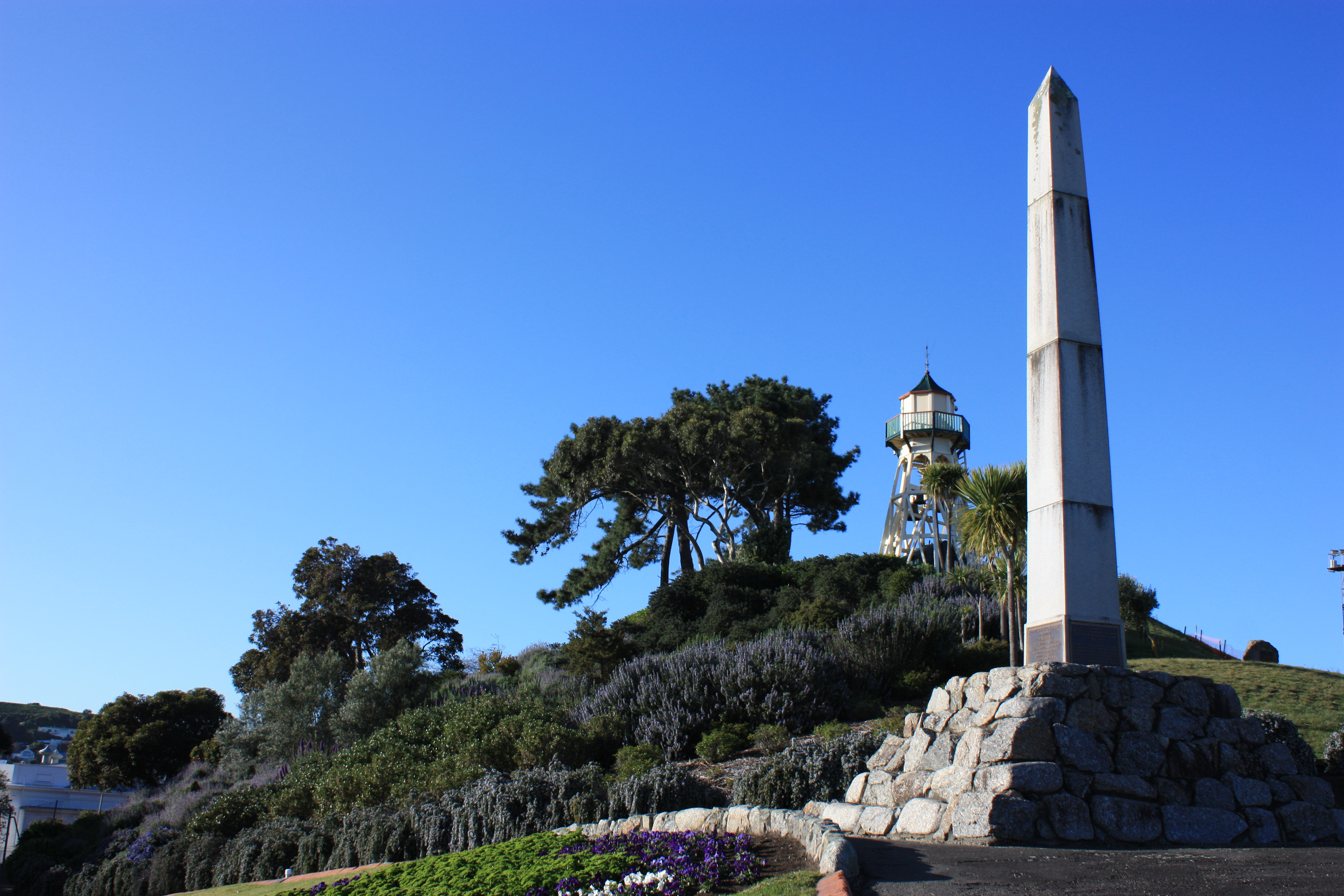
Wanganui Boer War Memorial
