= Frances Stewart (social activist) =

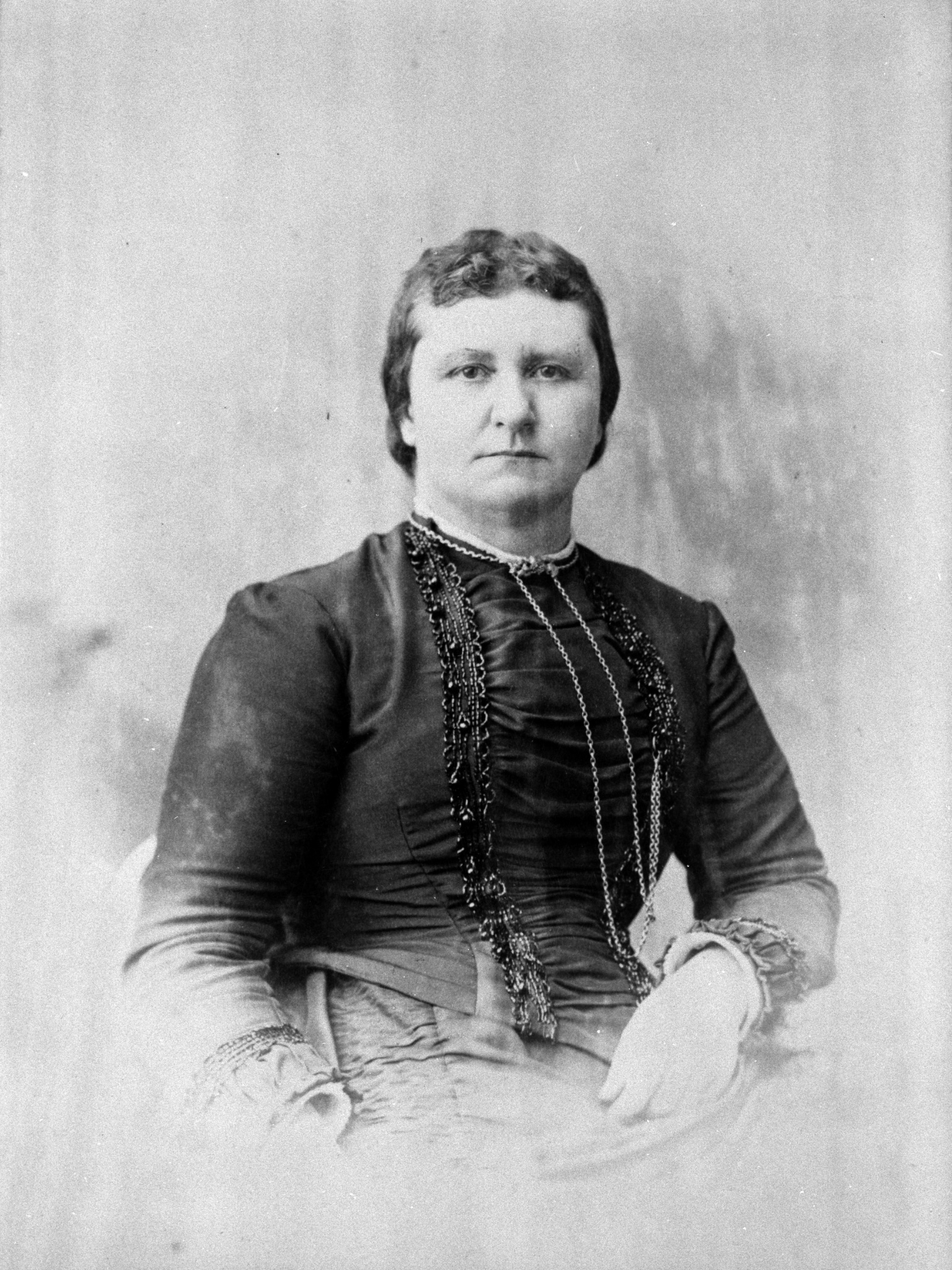
(undated)

Frances Ann Stewart (née Carkeek, 18 June 1840 – 12 November 1916) was an Australian-born New Zealand social activist for women and children's rights. She was the first female member of a New Zealand hospital board.

== Early life ==
Stewart was born in Sydney in 1840. Her parents were Martha Piotti and Stephen Carkeek, the commander of the revenue cutter Ranger. In 1842 the family moved to Nelson, New Zealand, where her brother Arthur Carkeek was born, and they moved again to Wellington in 1849 when her father was promoted to collector of customs. In 1865, she married the engineer and surveyor John Tiffin Stewart. In 1870 the Stewarts moved to Foxton, where Frances gave birth to five daughters and five sons.

== Advocacy ==
Stewart was a prominent social activist who advocated for numerous causes, particularly women's rights and children's health and education. After John Stewart retired in 1889, the family moved to Wanganui, where both Frances and John became important members of the community by hosting parties, fundraising, and leading community organisations. Frances Stewart was involved in the founding of the Protestant-run Wanganui Orphanage in 1889 and, following her infant grandson's serious illness and successful treatment in 1909, dedicated their house to children's healthcare; it became the Stewart Karitane Home. She also donated land to establish the Wanganui Girls' College and was appointed the superintendent of a system of Sunday schools in Wanganui.

Stewart fought for women's right to participate in public activities, including politics, education, and church affairs. In 1896 she nominated herself for election to the Wanganui Borough Council with a view to ultimately being elected to the Wanganui Hospital Board. Although she was not elected to the council, in 1897 and 1898 she was appointed to the Wanganui and Marton Hospital Boards, making her the first female member of a hospital board in New Zealand. Although she retired in 1899, citing the difficulty of achieving progress as the lone woman board member, she was reappointed to the Wanganui board for a year in 1903. In 1910, the first year that board members were elected rather than appointed, she ran again, and although she was unsuccessful she later said: "I consider myself a pioneer for my own sex, hoping that other women will have the courage to come forward the next time there is an election." She was a frequent letter writer to local newspapers, often using pseudonyms such as "A Mother", "Indignant Mother", and "Vox". Although Stewart was a suffragist, she believed that the vote should not be granted indiscriminately to all women, that women's education should focus on preparing them to be decent wives and mothers, and that granting women economic independence would lead to "plenty of domestic unhappiness".

== Later years in Whanganui ==
Stewart House was the home of John Tiffin Stewart and Frances Ann Stewart and is located in Plymouth Street Whanganui. It is now a private home but it is remembered as the Karitane Home and later as the boarding residence for secondary school students.

== Death ==
Stewart died in her Wanganui home on 12 November 1916.
