= John Tiffin Stewart =

New Zealand civil engineer and surveyor

John Tiffin Stewart (18 November 1827 – 19 April 1913) was a notable New Zealand civil engineer and surveyor and mapper. He was born in Rothesay, Bute, Scotland, in 1827 and was married to the social activist Frances Stewart. He is the father of Ellen Sarjeant who helped found the Sarjeant Gallery.

== Career in New Zealand ==
Much of Stewart's early surveying work was in Palmerston North. Stewart and his family later moved to Whanganui. The home they built in Campbell Street Whanganui was later the Karitane home, "Stewart House", and also a hostel for Whanganui City College.

In 1895 www.stlaurenceschapel.co.nz at 12 Gibson St, Aramoho, Whanganui was opened. John Tiffin Stewart gifted the land, designed the church and paid for the builder, www.heritage.org.nz/list-details/169/Listing. It is thought he used the book, on how to design a church, written by his friend Frederick de Jersey Clere as inspiration. His wife Frances Ann Stewart was active in the churches early years and his two daughters, Jane and Mabel were married there. The church still stands with an addition of a pitched roof vestibule, added in 1955. The interior is very original with vey few changes or additions to John Tiffin Stewart's design. Deconsecrated by the Anglican Church in 2023 it is now privately owned by Bryce Smith and www.suecooke.co.nz. It is currently used as an events centre for weddings, concerts, and drawing and visual arts workshops.

He worked as engineer for the Whanganui River Trust helping clear channels on the river.
