= Harete Hipango =

New Zealand politician

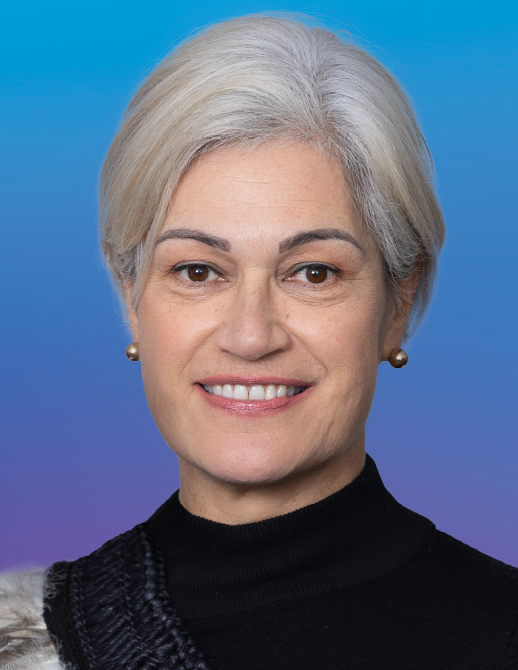
- Hipango in 2023

Member of the New Zealand Parliament for National Party list
- In office 11 June 2021 – 14 October 2023
- Preceded by: Nick Smith

Member of the New Zealand Parliament for Whanganui
- In office 23 September 2017 – 17 October 2020
- Preceded by: Chester Borrows
- Succeeded by: Steph Lewis

Personal details
- Born: 1964 or 1965 (age 61–62) Putiki, New Zealand
- Party: New Zealand First (2024–current)
- Other political affiliations: National (2017–2024)
- Spouse: Dean MacFater
- Children: 3

Harete Makere Hipango (born 1964 or 1965) is a New Zealand politician. She was a member of parliament in the House of Representatives for the National Party, and sat on the Māori Affairs Committee.

Hipango served as MP for the Whanganui electorate from 2017 to 2020, but was defeated in the 2020 general election. However, after National MP Nick Smith resigned in May 2021, she re-entered Parliament in June 2021 as a list MP. She failed to be re-elected at the 2023 election.

== Early life ==
Hipango was born in Whanganui, and raised in Pūtiki. Hipango was baptised a Catholic, and still identifies as a Christian. Hipango went to Queen's Park School, convent school at St Mary's Primary, St Joseph's Intermediate, and Sacred Heart College.

== Whakapapa ==
Hipango's father, Hoani Hīpango, is Māori, and her mother, Eileen Shaw, is Pākehā. Her iwi are Te Āti Haunui-a-Pāpārangi, Ngāti Apa, Ngā Rauru Kītahi, Ngāti Tamakōpiri, and Ngāti Whitikaupeka. She is the great-great-granddaughter of Hoani Wiremu Hīpango, and the great-granddaughter of Waata Hipango who gifted land to the people of Whanganui, which is now known as Hipango Park. Other family members include World War II pilot John Pohe and the chieftainess Rere-ō-maki, one of few women to sign the Treaty of Waitangi.

Hoani Hīpango and Shaw met at Shelly Bay when they were both in the Royal New Zealand Air Force.

Hipango and her husband, Dean MacFater, have three children.

== Pre-parliamentary career ==
Hipango graduated from University of Auckland in 1991, with a Bachelor of Laws, and practised as a lawyer in Whanganui for more than 25 years. She was involved in the 1995 Pākaitore occupation as a lawyer, and in 2004 participated in the march against the Foreshore and Seabed legislation. Hipango was a member of the Whanganui District Health Board. In 2011, Hipango was appointed as an additional member of the Legal Aid Tribunal.

== Parliamentary career ==
New Zealand Parliament
| Years | Term | Electorate | List | Party |
|---|---|---|---|---|
| 2017–2020 | 52nd | Whanganui | 62 | National |
| 2021–2023 | 53rd | List | 21 | National |
| 2026–present | 55th | List | 7 | NZ First |

=== 2017 general election ===
Hipango was selected by the New Zealand National Party to contest the Whanganui electorate at the 2017 general election, after the retirement of incumbent MP Chester Borrows. It was the first time the party had chosen a Māori woman to contest a seat that it already held. She won the electorate seat with 16,751 votes, compared to Labour candidate Steph Lewis garnering 15,045 votes.

In her first term, Hipango strongly opposed the End of Life Choice Act 2019 and the Abortion Legislation Act 2020. Hipango received considerable media attention when she said that Prime Minister Jacinda Ardern was being morally inconsistent by voting to decriminalise abortion while also speaking out on child mortality rates. Hipango also stated that the act allowed for full-term abortions, which was criticised by many as being factually incorrect, as under the legislation two health practitioners must sign off any abortion after 20 weeks.

In a series of interviews given in 2021, many fellow National MPs criticised Hipango for her actions in her first term. Several said that she was not well-liked in the caucus and "didn't have a lot of friends", with one MP saying that she "sailed her own waka" and seemed to think the party should be honoured that she agreed to join, rather than being grateful for the opportunity. Some described her as a liability, and not a team player. Hipango herself said in 2021 that it was very lonely during her time as an MP and Māori woman in the National Party caucus and that the party still undervalues the Māori voice.

Hipango helped unseat leader Simon Bridges in a leadership challenge of May 2020 in which Todd Muller took leadership. Some among the National Party felt that National MPs who supported Judith Collins, which included Hipango, supported Muller's bid as a step towards leadership by Collins, and Collins would become the leader of the party in July 2020.

=== 2020 general election ===
At the 2020 general election, Hipango was defeated in Whanganui by Labour's Steph Lewis by a margin of 8,191 votes in a massive swing towards Labour. Hipango was ranked 21st on National's party list, but this was not high enough to receive a seat at the election. Hipango was National's highest-ranked list candidate who did not enter parliament after the 2020 election.

In September 2020, ahead of the election, Hipango posted an image on Facebook of Prime Minister Jacinda Ardern overlaid with the text of a quote falsely attributed to Ardern. Hipango denied any wrongdoing, telling the Whanganui Chronicle "It is not a false quote ... It is a construction of key words aligned with Jacinda Ardern."

=== 2021 return to parliament ===
In May 2021, National list MP Nick Smith announced that he would resign and Hipango replaced him. Hipango re-entered parliament on 11 June 2021. She took on Smith's electoral reform and research and science portfolios, as well as the portfolio of Māori tourism that she had held previously, but other policy work for the party previously undertaken by Smith was taken on by a more senior MP. Hipango was appointed to represent National on the Māori Affairs Committee.

On her return, one fellow MP expressed mixed feelings, saying “While she is a conservative and some people think we have too many of those, she is also bringing some ethnic diversity to the caucus, which we desperately need", while another said that she would need to change her behaviour of "talking outside of the party view". Todd Muller later identified himself as one of the anonymous critical MPs, allegedly after being overheard making his comments, and announced on 23 June 2021 that he would not stand at the next general election, following a late-night caucus meeting. After then-leader Judith Collins was replaced by Christopher Luxon, he changed his position and said he would not leave the party, and would run in his electorate again.

==== Inappropriate spending allegations ====
In June 2021, the New Zealand Herald alleged that Hipango had purchased items of furniture and a television with Parliamentary Service funds, but had the items delivered to her home rather than used in her electorate office. Hipango refused to comment on the issue when it was revealed, but National's then-leader Judith Collins said "I had a look at the numbers, there's very little in it and actually the information she has provided to me was that everything she purchased she purchased correctly or she paid for herself once she was alerted to the fact it had been wrongly coded." The Parliamentary Service said that no formal complaint had been made against Hipango and declined to comment further.

==== Appearances at anti-vaccination protests ====
On 3 November 2021, Hipango appeared at a protest against COVID-19 vaccination at a vaccination clinic in Whanganui. The protest was intended to disrupt a planned visit to the centre by Prime Minister Jacinda Ardern. When Hipango was seen by a Newshub reporter, she said that she was there to support her community, but shortly afterwards she left. She later said that she had thought it was a protest about another issue. Ardern later cancelled her visit to the centre for security reasons.

On 8 January 2022, Hipango again appeared at a rally in Whanganui against COVID-19 vaccination and lockdowns. The rally was organised by Voices for Freedom, New Zealand's largest anti-vaccination group, known for spreading vaccine misinformation and protesting restrictions. Hipango posted an image of herself at the rally to social media, alongside a post criticising the label 'anti-vaxer' and 'misinformer'. Hipango later deleted the post, and National Party leader Christopher Luxon released a statement saying the views of Voices for Freedom do not align with the National Party.

==== Wikipedia edits ====
On 27 January 2022, Hipango acknowledged that she had asked a member of her staff to edit her Wikipedia biography to remove any mention of negative or controversial issues that Hipango was involved in, including her attendance at anti-vaccination rallies. The staff member deleted the "Controversies" section of her Wikipedia page four times, identifying themselves as a staff member and therefore a person with a conflict of interest according to the Wikipedia community. Hipango later said that she regretted this request.

=== 2023 election ===
In April 2023 the National Party announced that Hipango was its candidate for Te Tai Hauāuru for the 2023 election, making her the first National candidate for a Māori seat since the 2002 election. Final results indicated that she came third in the electorate with 1,382 votes compared to the winner Debbie Ngarewa-Packer's 16,358 votes. She had been ranked 31st on National's list, which was not high enough to keep her in Parliament.

=== 2026 election ===
Following her election loss she joined New Zealand First. In July 2026, Hipango was selected to contest the Whanganui electorate for the 2026 election. She was ranked seventh place on NZ First's party list.

Based on preliminary results, Hipango-Brownlie came third place in the Whanganui contest with 3,412 votes. The electorate was retained by incumbent National candidate Carl Bates. However, she was elected to Parliament via the NZ First party list.

New Zealand Parliament
| Preceded by Chester Borrows | Member of Parliament for Whanganui; 2017–2020 | Succeeded by Steph Lewis |
