= Archibald Willis =

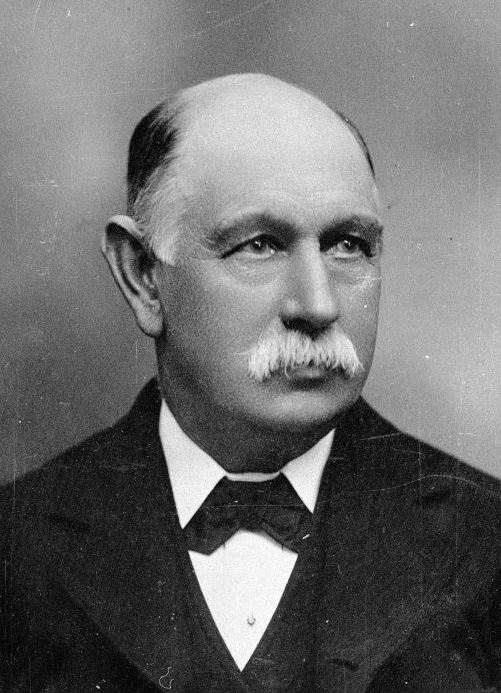

Member of the New Zealand Parliament for Wanganui
- In office 9 June 1893 – 4 December 1896
- Preceded by: John Ballance
- Succeeded by: Gilbert Carson
- In office 6 December 1899 – 6 December 1905
- Preceded by: Gilbert Carson
- Succeeded by: James Thomas Hogan

Personal details
- Born: Archibald Dudingston Willis; 1842 London, England
- Died: 27 August 1908 (aged 65–66) Gisborne, New Zealand
- Party: Liberal
- Relations: Nicola Willis (great-great-granddaughter)
- Children: 10

Archibald Dudingston Willis (1842–27 August 1908) was a journalist and Liberal Party Member of Parliament in New Zealand. Prior to entering parliament, Willis was a newspaper proprietor for the Wanganui Herald founded by John Ballance.

== Early life ==
Willis was born in London in 1842. He spent his youth in an apprenticeship in the printer's trade. After the death of his mother, his father was also deceased, Willis sailed from England aboard the ship Dinapore and landed in Auckland in 1857. He immediately sought employment as a printer, working across in many parts of New Zealand as a journeyman, till he opened his own printing business, remaining in the business almost continuously until his death. Willis was the founder of the Hawke's Bay Herald in Hastings, but left the paper to partake in the gold rush in Otago. After six months of mining Willis returned to the print business and came to Wanganui in 1864, where he was to spend the rest of his life.

He intended to establish his own newspaper there, but upon arrival, he was called to serve in the militia to fight against Māori in the area. Afterwards, Willis entered into partnership with John Ballance as co-proprietors of the Wanganui Herald and the two formed a close friendship. Later, Willis also purchased a local book and stationery business from William Hutchison. He was also a prominent member of the Wanganui Chamber of Commerce.

== Political career ==
New Zealand Parliament
Years	Term	Electorate	Party
1893	11th	Wanganui	Liberal
1893–1896	12th	Wanganui	Liberal
1899–1902	14th	Wanganui	Liberal
1902–1905	15th	Wanganui	Liberal

Willis was active in local politics in Wanganui. He spent six years a Borough Councillor and also served a member of the Harbour Board, including time as its chairman.

The death of Willis' friend and business partner, John Ballance, triggered the 1893 by-election in the Wanganui electorate, which was held on 13 June and won by Willis. He received support from the constituents to keep the "Ballance tradition" alive. He was confirmed at the 1893 general election a few months later. He was defeated in 1896 by the Conservative candidate Gilbert Carson, who was proprietor of the Herald's rival newspaper the Wanganui Chronicle. Willis won the seat back for the Liberals in 1899, and was defeated again in 1905.

Willis was a supporter of the Liberal government's welfare programs under Richard Seddon. Personally, he advocated for loaning government money for state housing. Despite having similar ideologies, Willis was famous for his turbulent relationship with Seddon, the two men disliked each other which caused many arguments between the two.

In 1901, Willis attempted to address the complaints by labourers that the Industrial Conciliation & Arbitration Act was too slow by proposing the conciliation phase be removed. In what was to become known as the "Willis Blot", a clause was proposed to bypass industrial disputes straight to the Arbitration Court with the idea of hastening the process.

== Death ==
Willis died in Gisborne on 27 August 1908 from a throat infection. He was survived by his wife, six sons and four daughters.

== Notes ==
New Zealand Parliament
Preceded by John Ballance	Member of Parliament for Wanganui; 1893–1896 1899–1905	Succeeded by Gilbert Carson
Preceded by Gilbert Carson	Member of Parliament for Wanganui; 1893–1896 1899–1905	Succeeded by James Thomas Hogan
