= Steph Lewis =

New Zealand politician

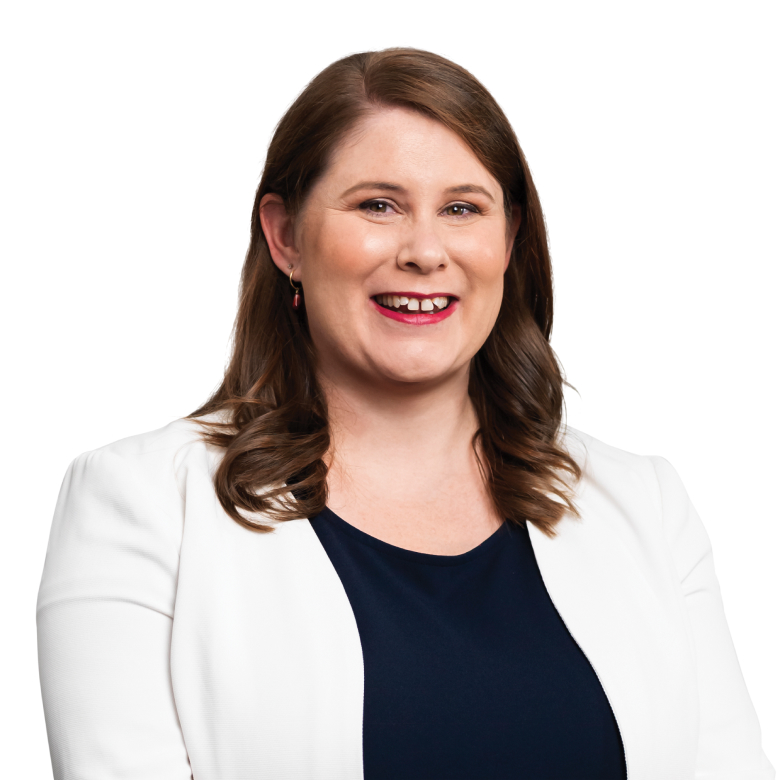
- Lewis in 2023

Member of the New Zealand Parliament for Whanganui
- In office 17 October 2020 – 14 October 2023
- Preceded by: Harete Hipango
- Succeeded by: Carl Bates

Personal details
- Born: 1987 or 1988 (age 37–38) Whanganui, New Zealand
- Party: Labour
- Spouse: Rob Carr
- Children: 2

Stephanie Lewis (born 1987 or 1988) is a New Zealand politician of the Labour Party. She served as the Member of Parliament for Whanganui from 2020 to 2023.

== Personal life ==
Lewis grew up in Whanganui and Waverley. She attended Whanganui City College and Victoria University of Wellington, where she studied law. In 2004 she was a member of the New Zealand Youth Parliament, selected to represent Whanganui MP Jill Pettis.

Lewis worked at the Accident Compensation Corporation (ACC) where she also became a trade union delegate. She later worked for the Privacy Commissioner. Lewis is married to Rob Carr, who was a senior ministerial adviser to Prime Minister Jacinda Ardern.

In February 2022, while she was pregnant, Lewis was harassed by anti-COVID vaccine mandate protestors outside Parliament, who threatened to lynch and kidnap her.

== Political career ==
New Zealand Parliament
Years	Term	Electorate	List	Party
2020–2023	53rd	Whanganui	55	Labour

Lewis won the Labour Party nomination for Whanganui in 2017 ahead of district councillor Philippa Baker-Hogan and moved from Wellington back to Whanganui to campaign full time. Lewis was re-selected as Labour's candidate for Whanganui in the 2020 election. She was elected a week before Labour's annual conference, which was held in Whanganui for the first time in the party's history.

Early returns in the 2020 general election placed her ahead of incumbent National Party MP Harete Hipango, and she was declared the winner on 18 October 2020 with a majority of approximately 6,800 votes based on preliminary results. Following the release of the final results on 6 November, Lewis' majority increased to 8,191 votes.

During the 2023 New Zealand general election, Lewis was unseated by National candidate Carl Bates, who won by a margin of 5,512 votes.

New Zealand Parliament
Preceded by Harete Hipango	Member of Parliament for Whanganui; 2020–2023	Succeeded by Carl Bates
