= 1983 Labour Party leadership election =

Labour Party leadership elections were held in the following countries in 1983:

- 1983 Labour Party leadership election (UK)
- 1983 New Zealand Labour Party leadership election
