= Senior Whip of the Labour Party =

Party leadership position in the New Zealand Parliamentary system

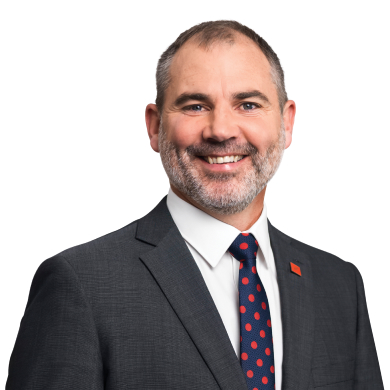
- Incumbent; Glen Bennett since 11 March 2025
- Reports to: Leader of the Labour Party
- Precursor: Tangi Utikere
- Inaugural holder: Andrew Walker
- Formation: 7 July 1916
- Deputy: Tracey McLellan

The New Zealand Labour Party's Senior Whip administers the "whipping in" system that tries to ensure that party MPs attend and vote according to the party leadership's wishes. The position is elected by the Labour caucus members. The senior whip also acts as an intermediary between the backbenchers and the party leadership. Whenever Labour is in government the senior whip serves as the chief government whip and when out of government serves as chief opposition whip; thus the position is also referred to as "Chief Whip".

All Labour whips have been members of the House of Representatives, with none coming from the Legislative Council before its abolition in 1950.

The current senior whip is Glen Bennett.

== List ==
The following is a list of all senior whips of the Labour Party:

No.	Name	Portrait	Electorate	Term of office	
1	Andrew Walker		Dunedin North	7 July 1916	28 August 1919
2	James McCombs		Lyttelton	28 August 1919	10 March 1921
3	Dan Sullivan		Avon	10 March 1921	5 December 1935
4	Bill Jordan		Manukau	5 December 1935	11 June 1936
5	Robert McKeen		Wellington South	11 June 1936	11 May 1939
6	James O'Brien		Westland	11 May 1939	2 December 1942
7	Arthur Shapton Richards		Mount Albert	2 December 1942	5 August 1947†
8	Robert McFarlane		Christchurch Central	19 September 1947	27 June 1951
9	Phil Connolly		Dunedin Central	27 June 1951	10 July 1952
10	Joe Cotterill		Wanganui	10 July 1952	9 January 1958
11	Henry May		Onslow	9 January 1958	29 November 1972
12	Ron Barclay		New Plymouth	29 November 1972	29 January 1976
13	Roger Drayton		St Albans	29 January 1976	5 May 1978
14	Russell Marshall		Wanganui	5 May 1978	13 February 1980
15	Jonathan Hunt		New Lynn	13 February 1980	19 July 1984
16	Michael Cullen		St Kilda	19 July 1984	18 August 1987
17	Margaret Austin		Yaldhurst	18 August 1987	8 February 1990
18	Trevor Mallard		Hamilton West	8 February 1990	31 October 1990
(15)	Jonathan Hunt		New Lynn	31 October 1990	19 December 1996
19	Mark Burton		Taupo	19 December 1996	10 December 1999
20	Rick Barker		Tukituki	10 December 1999	15 August 2002
21	David Benson-Pope		Dunedin South	15 August 2002	26 February 2004
22	Jill Pettis		Wanganui	26 February 2004	1 November 2005
23	Tim Barnett		Christchurch Central	1 November 2005	8 November 2008
24	Darren Hughes		List MP	8 November 2008	25 March 2011
–	Steve Chadwick (acting)		List MP	25 March 2011	5 April 2011
(20)	Rick Barker		List MP	5 April 2011	13 December 2011
25	Chris Hipkins		Rimutaka	13 December 2011	17 September 2013
26	Sue Moroney		List MP	17 September 2013	23 September 2014
(25)	Chris Hipkins		Rimutaka	23 September 2014	15 December 2016
27	Kris Faafoi		Mana	15 December 2016	31 October 2017
28	Ruth Dyson		Port Hills	31 October 2017	27 June 2019
29	Michael Wood		Mount Roskill	27 June 2019	2 November 2020
30	Kieran McAnulty		Wairarapa	2 November 2020	14 June 2022
31	Duncan Webb		Christchurch Central	14 June 2022	31 January 2023
32	Tangi Utikere		Palmerston North	31 January 2023	11 March 2025
33	Glen Bennett		List MP	11 March 2025	present

== See also ==
- Senior Whip of the National Party
- Senior Whip of the Liberal Party
