= 1893 Wanganui by-election =

New Zealand by-election

- 9 June 1893
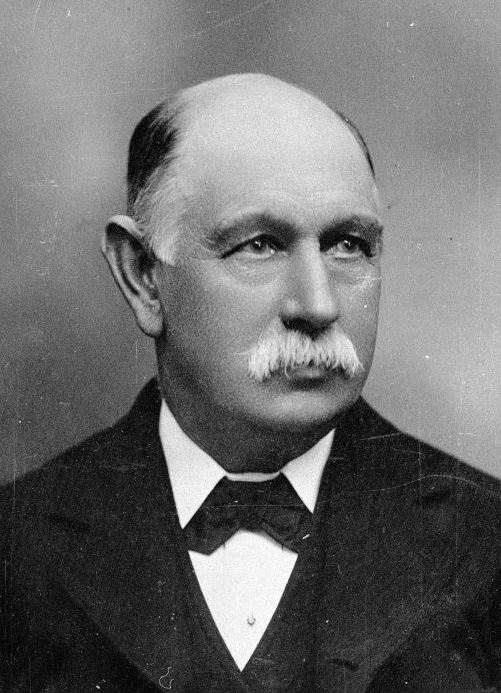

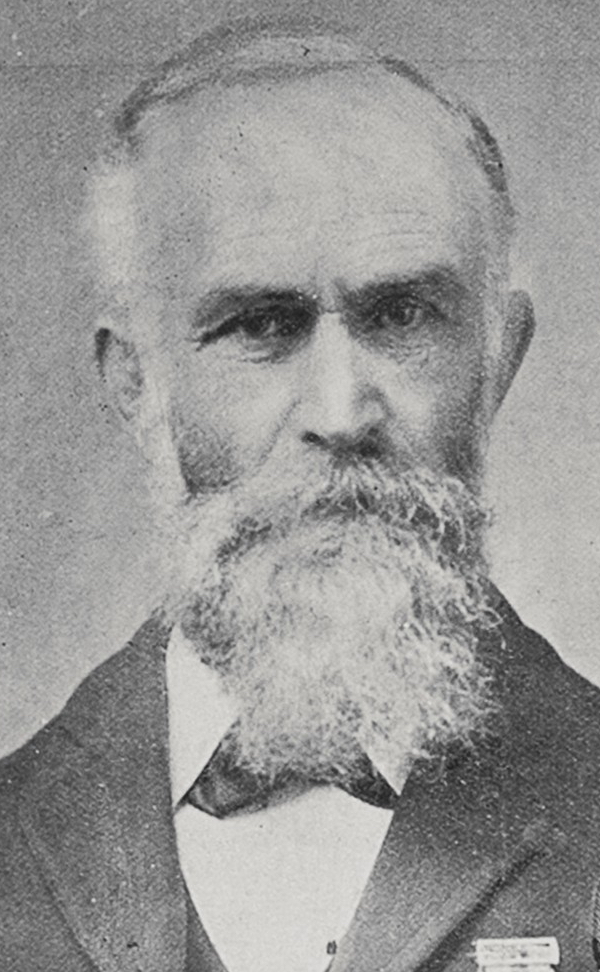
Candidate	Archibald Willis	Gilbert Carson
Party	Liberal	Conservative
Popular vote	1,031	622
Percentage	62.37	37.62
Member before election
John Ballance
Liberal
Elected Member
Archibald Willis
Liberal

The 1893 Wanganui by-election was a by-election held on 9 June 1893 during the 11th New Zealand Parliament in the central North Island electorate of Wanganui.

The election was held due to the death of sitting Member, Prime Minister John Ballance. The contest for his former seat was won by his longtime friend and business partner Archibald Willis, who received support from the constituents by keeping the "Ballance tradition" alive.

== Results ==
The following table gives the election results:

1893 Wanganui by-election
Party	Candidate	Votes	%	±%
Liberal	Archibald Willis	1,031	62.37	
Conservative	Gilbert Carson	622	37.62	
Majority		409	24.74	
Turnout		1,653		
