= Minister of Disarmament and Arms Control =

New Zealand minister of the Crown

- Coat of arms of New Zealand

- Flag of New Zealand
- Ministry of Foreign Affairs and Trade
- Style: The Honourable
- Member of: Cabinet of New Zealand; Executive Council
- Reports to: Prime Minister of New Zealand
- Appointer: Governor-General of New Zealand
- Term length: At His Majesty's pleasure
- Formation: 8 June 1987
- First holder: Russell Marshall
- Salary: $288,900
- Website: www.beehive.govt.nz

The minister of disarmament and arms control was a minister in the government of New Zealand.

== History and responsibilities ==
The portfolio was established after the declaration of the New Zealand nuclear-free zone and passage of the New Zealand Nuclear Free Zone, Disarmament, and Arms Control Act 1987 (the Act) on 8 June 1987. As of 2020, the New Zealand Ministry of Foreign Affairs and Trade believed that New Zealand was the only country to have a standalone disarmament portfolio. A briefing to the minister from that year stated that the purpose of the portfolio was to "provide leadership of New Zealand’s efforts to achieve progress on disarmament and non-proliferation, both in support of the global public good that these entail and as an important contribution to [New Zealand's] national interest."

Under the Act, the Minister is the chair of the Public Advisory Committee on Disarmament and Arms Control. They led the New Zealand Government's engagement on the New Agenda Coalition and the Stockholm Initiative for Nuclear Disarmament.

The portfolio was disestablished in 2011 following the report of the Public Advisory Committee on Disarmament and Arms Control. Responsibilities of the minister were incorporated into the foreign affairs portfolio. A separate disarmament and arms control portfolio was re-established in 2018 but no further appointment was made after the 2023 general election.

From 2023, in lieu of the separate ministerial portfolio, government functions related to disarmament and arms control were delegated to the Associate Minister of Foreign Affairs, Todd McClay.

== List of ministers ==
The following ministers have held the office of Minister for Disarmament and Arms Control.

Key

Labour National Alliance NZ First

No.	Name	Portrait	Term of office		Prime Minister
1	Russell Marshall		8 June 1987	24 August 1989	Lange
1	Russell Marshall		8 June 1987	24 August 1989	Palmer
2	Fran Wilde		24 August 1989	2 November 1990	Palmer
2	Fran Wilde		24 August 1989	2 November 1990	Moore
3	Doug Graham		2 November 1990	16 December 1996	Bolger
4	Don McKinnon		16 December 1996	10 December 1999	Bolger
4	Don McKinnon		16 December 1996	10 December 1999	Shipley
5	Matt Robson		10 December 1999	15 August 2002	Clark
6	Marian Hobbs		15 August 2002	12 October 2005	Clark
7	Phil Goff		12 October 2005	19 November 2008	Clark
8	Georgina te Heuheu		19 November 2008	14 December 2011	Key
Office not in use
9	Winston Peters		2 May 2018	6 November 2020	Ardern
10	Phil Twyford		6 November 2020	1 February 2023	Ardern
10	Phil Twyford		6 November 2020	1 February 2023	Hipkins
11	Nanaia Mahuta		1 February 2023	11 November 2023	Hipkins
12	Grant Robertson		11 November 2023	27 November 2023	Hipkins

== See also ==
- Ministry of Foreign Affairs and Trade (New Zealand)
- Arms control
- Nuclear disarmament
