= Joe Cotterill =

New Zealand politician (1905–1982)

Joe Cotterill OBE
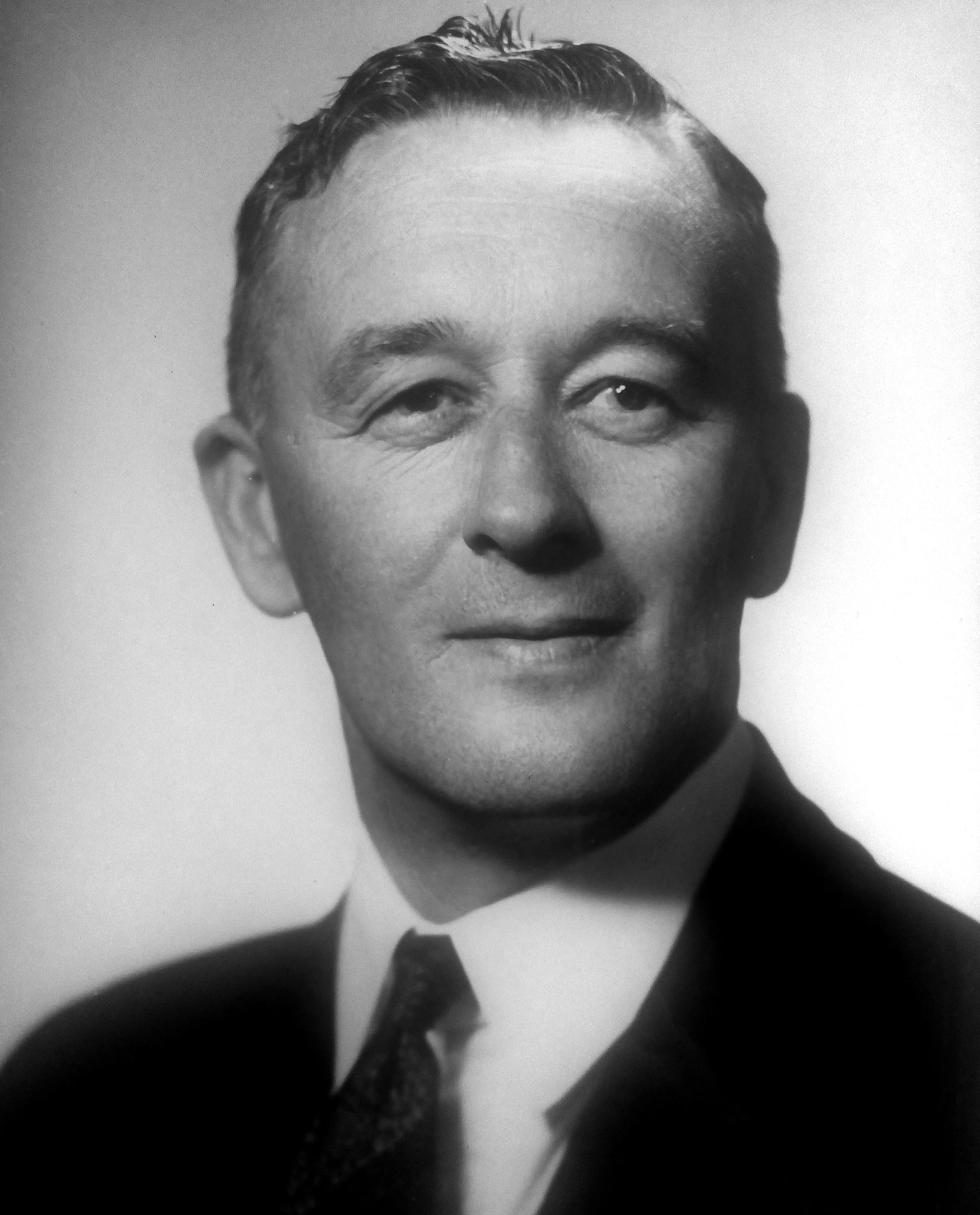

Senior Whip of the Labour Party
- In office 10 July 1952 – 9 January 1958
- Deputy: John Mathison
- Preceded by: Philip Connolly
- Succeeded by: Henry May

Member of the New Zealand Parliament for Wanganui
- In office 27 November 1935 – 26 November 1960
- Preceded by: Bill Veitch
- Succeeded by: George Spooner

Personal details
- Born: 26 September 1905 Wanganui, New Zealand
- Died: 8 July 1982 (aged 76) Wanganui, New Zealand
- Party: Labour
- Spouse: Daisy Ellen Wilks
- Children: 3
- Profession: Painter

Joseph Bernard Francis Cotterill OBE (26 September 1905 – 8 July 1982) was a New Zealand trade unionist, sport administrator and politician of the Labour Party.

== Biography ==
=== Early life and career ===
Cotterill was born in 1905 in Wanganui, both his parents were foundation members of the Labour Party, and entered an apprenticeship as a painter, working at the East Town Railway Workshops. Soon after he became secretary of the East Town branch of the Amalgamated Society of Railway Servants. In 1930 he married Daisy Ellen Wilks, with whom he had two sons and a daughter.

He was an active athlete and played competitive rugby, hockey, swimming and rowing as well as a surf lifesaver. He represented Wanganui at both rugby and hockey. Cotterill was an active member of the Pirate Rugby Club and the Union Boat Club. He served as a sports administrator as well for many years. He was president of the Wanganui Swimming Centre for ten years.

=== Political career ===
New Zealand Parliament
Years	Term	Electorate	Party
1935–1938	25th	Wanganui	Labour
1938–1943	26th	Wanganui	Labour
1943–1946	27th	Wanganui	Labour
1946–1949	28th	Wanganui	Labour
1949–1951	29th	Wanganui	Labour
1951–1954	30th	Wanganui	Labour
1954–1957	31st	Wanganui	Labour
1957–1960	32nd	Wanganui	Labour

Cotterill joined the Labour Party in 1928 and became secretary of first the Wanganui East branch and later the Wanganui LRC. At the 1933 local-body elections he was elected to both the Wanganui City Council and Power Board, sitting on the bodies until 1938. In 1944 he was elected to the Wanganui Harbour Board, serving a three-year term. He served in the New Zealand Army during World War II and was also the first chairman of the Wanganui rehabilitation committee when it was established in 1943, serving as its head for many years.

He represented the Wanganui electorate from 1935 to 1960, when he retired for family reasons, by which time he was Wanganui's longest ever serving MP. In 1943 he faced a challenge from John A. Lee's Democratic Soldier Labour Party.

He became Labour's junior whip in 1951 and was senior whip from 1952 until 1958. Cotterill was regarded as one of the best performing backbenchers of the First Labour Government and many thought he was more than unlucky to miss out on a place in cabinet after the formation of the Second Labour Government in 1957.

Cotterill was particularly interested in foreign affairs and spoke frequently on the topic in parliament. During the Second Labour Government he was chairman of Parliament's External Affairs Committee. In 1960 he represented the government at the opening of the third Cook Islands Legislative Assembly. He was also New Zealand's representative at two Commonwealth association conferences, in Ottawa in 1952 and Kampala in 1960. He was also the chair of a select committee on irrigation in New Zealand.

In 1953, Cotterill was awarded the Queen Elizabeth II Coronation Medal.

=== Later life and death ===
After retiring from Parliament, Cotterill became President of the New Zealand Swimming Association (1957–59) and was a national selector from 1960 until 1962. From 1954 to 1962 he was New Zealand's representative on the Olympic Swimming Association executive. He was appointed an Officer of the Order of the British Empire, for public services, in the 1974 Queen's Birthday Honours.

In 1976, Cotterill had a leg amputated and suffered from ill health frequently thereafter. He was admitted to Wanganui Hospital in June 1982 and died there on 8 July 1982. He was survived by his wife, three children, eleven grandchildren and six great-grandchildren.

== Notes ==
New Zealand Parliament
Preceded by Bill Veitch	Member of Parliament for Wanganui; 1935–60	Succeeded by George Spooner
Party political offices
Preceded by Philip Connolly	Senior Whip of the Labour Party; 1952–1958	Succeeded by Henry May
