= Bill Tolhurst =

New Zealand politician (1931–2013)

Member of the New Zealand Parliament for Wanganui
- In office 29 November 1969 – 25 November 1972
- Preceded by: George Spooner
- Succeeded by: Russell Marshall

Personal details
- Born: William Gerald Tolhurst; 20 April 1931 Masterton, New Zealand
- Died: 18 August 2013 (aged 82) Taupō, New Zealand
- Party: National
- Spouse: Jeni Baker (m. 1955)
- Relations: Catherine Wedd (granddaughter)
- Children: 4
- Education: University of Otago
- Profession: Accountant

William Gerald Tolhurst (20 April 1931 – 18 August 2013) was a New Zealand chartered accountant and politician of the National Party.

== Biography ==
=== Early life and family ===
Tolhurst was born in Masterton in 1931, the son of Wellington sharebroker Gerald Tolhurst and his second wife Noeline Parata Tolhurst (formerly Mace, née Cruickshank). He was educated at Wanganui Collegiate School, Victoria University College, and the University of Otago where he obtained the degree of Bachelor of Commerce. In 1955, Tolhurst married Jenifer Baker, with whom he had two sons and two daughters. His wife's father was Leyden Baker from Cashmere.

Tolhurst worked for public accountants Barr, Burgess and Stewart (now PWC) in Wellington from 1948 to 1952 and was admitted to the New Zealand Society of Accountants in June 1952. Then he moved to Barr Burgess's head office in Dunedin. Returning to the North Island, he moved to Wanganui, working there for public accountant G. K. Campbell for a further year before setting up his own independent practice in that city. He was awarded fellowship of the Society of Accountants in June 1969 before he stood for election to parliament.

=== Political career ===
New Zealand Parliament
Years	Term	Electorate	Party
1969–1972	36th	Wanganui	National

Tolhurst was secretary for the National Party in the Wanganui electorate from 1956 until 1968, and treasurer for the Waimarino electorate. He represented Wanganui for three years from his election in 1969 until 1972, when he was defeated by Labour's Russell Marshall.

Later he was active in local politics and was elected a member of the Manawatu-Wanganui Regional Council until he retired in 1998.

=== Death and legacy ===
Tolhurst died at his home in Taupō on 18 August 2013. His wife, Jeni Tolhurst, died in 2021. She was National's candidate for Wanganui in 1981.

Tolhurst's granddaughter, Catherine Wedd, was elected as the National Party MP for Tukituki at the 2023 general election.

== Notes ==
New Zealand Parliament
Preceded by George Spooner	Member of Parliament for Wanganui; 1969–1972	Succeeded by Russell Marshall
