= Ulric Williams =

New Zealand naturopath (1890–1971)

Ulric Gaster Williams (22 May 1890 – 21 December 1971) was a New Zealand doctor and naturopath. He was born in Putiki, Wanganui, New Zealand in 1890. He received his education at Wanganui Collegiate School. While "regarded by many as a crank and a fanatic", his advocates describe him as "an original thinker" whose ideas on natural living were "perhaps ahead of his time".
