= 1876 Wanganui by-election =

New Zealand by-election

The 1876 Wanganui by-election was a by-election held on 27 September 1876 in the Wanganui electorate during the 6th New Zealand Parliament. It was then a two-member electorate; the other member being John Bryce.

The by-election was caused by the resignation of the incumbent, Julius Vogel, who was going to London as Agent-General. He was replaced by William Fox, despite him being absent from the colony at the time and not expected back for two months.

John Morgan, who came second was a farmer. He was nominated as William Fox had not been communicated with, and might wish to go in the upper house rather than the lower house when he returned.

== Result ==
The following table gives the election result:

1876 Wanganui by-election
| Party | Candidate | Votes | % | ±% |
|---|---|---|---|---|
| Independent | William Fox | 256 | 60.81 | |
| Independent | John Morgan | 165 | 39.19 | |
| Turnout | | 421 | | |
| Majority | | 91 | 21.62 | |
