= 1861 Wanganui by-election =

New Zealand by-election

The 1861 Wanganui by-election was a by-election held on 5 July 1861 in the Wanganui electorate during the 3rd New Zealand Parliament.

The by-election was caused by the resignation of the incumbent, Henry Shafto Harrison, as he was a sheriff of the district.

He was declared elected unopposed, as he was the only candidate nominated. He was not a supporter of the Fox Party so could mean the lack of support rather than a majority of one for William Fox.
