= 1867 Wanganui by-election =

New Zealand by-election

The 1867 Wanganui by-election was a by-election held on 29 April 1867 in the Wanganui electorate during the 4th New Zealand Parliament.

The by-election was caused by the resignation of the incumbent, John Bryce, who had resigned because of ill-health.

He was replaced by Henry Shafto Harrison, who had previously represented the district.

Hutchison, who came second, was the editor of The Chronicle.

== Result ==
The following table gives the election result:

1867 Wanganui by-election
Party	Candidate	Votes	%	±%
Independent	Henry Shafto Harrison	143	57.66	
Independent	William Hutchison	105	42.34	
Turnout		248		
Majority		38	15.32	
