= George Spooner =

New Zealand politician

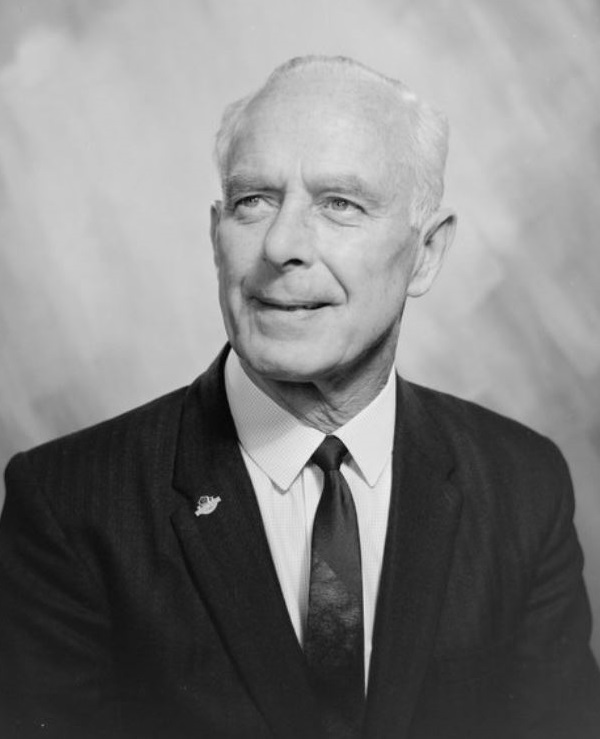

Member of the New Zealand Parliament for Wanganui
- In office 26 November 1960 – 29 November 1969
- Preceded by: Joe Cotterill
- Succeeded by: Bill Tolhurst

Personal details
- Born: 25 May 1906 Pātea, New Zealand
- Died: 5 May 1975 (aged 68) Wanganui, New Zealand
- Party: Labour
- Spouse: Edith Annie Clarke
- Children: 3
- Profession: Blacksmith

George Arthur Spooner (25 May 1906 – 5 May 1975) was a New Zealand politician of the Labour Party.

== Biography ==
=== Early life and career ===
Spooner was born on 25 May 1906 in Pātea, one of six children, to Arthur Frederick (Fred) Spooner and Mary Ann Prouse. He became a blacksmith by trade, working at both the Patea Freezing Works and for the Wanganui Harbour Board. In 1926 he married Edith Annie Clarke with whom he had three children. While working for the Harbour Board, he became the chair of the Harbour Employees Union and the East Town branch of the Amalgamated Society of Railway Servants. He saw active service overseas during World War II as an anti-aircraft gunner.

Spooner became the secretary of the Wanganui Trades Council, leading him to politics. He became president of the Wanganui Branch of the Labour Party and later the Wanganui Labour Representation Committee.

=== Political career ===
New Zealand Parliament
Years	Term	Electorate	Party
1960–1963	33rd	Wanganui	Labour
1963–1966	34th	Wanganui	Labour
1966–1969	35th	Wanganui	Labour

He represented the Wanganui electorate from 1960, but was unexpectedly defeated in 1969 by National's Bill Tolhurst.

During his time as a Member of Parliament he advocated in particular for better quality housing, workers' compensation and social security benefits for his constituents. Spooner twice stood for the vice-presidency of the Labour Party. He gained minimal support with only 6 delegates voting for him in 1969 and 8 in 1970.

In 1968 he introduced a bill to the house that would extend the powers of the Office of the Ombudsman to local bodies. The bill was voted down, but a bill in 1975 with the same purpose was eventually passed by the Third Labour Government.

=== Later life and death ===
He died in Wanganui on 5 May 1975, aged 69, survived by his wife and children.

== Notes ==
New Zealand Parliament
Preceded by Joe Cotterill	Member of Parliament for Wanganui; 1960–1969	Succeeded by Bill Tolhurst
