= 1983 New Zealand Labour Party leadership election =

New Zealand party leadership election

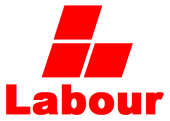
- 3 February 1983
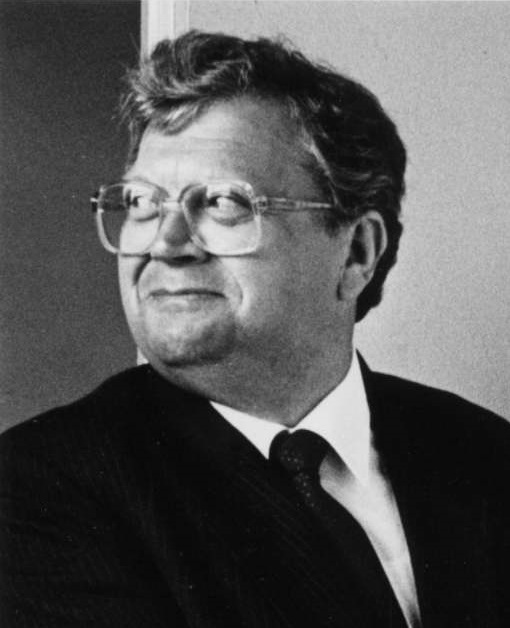

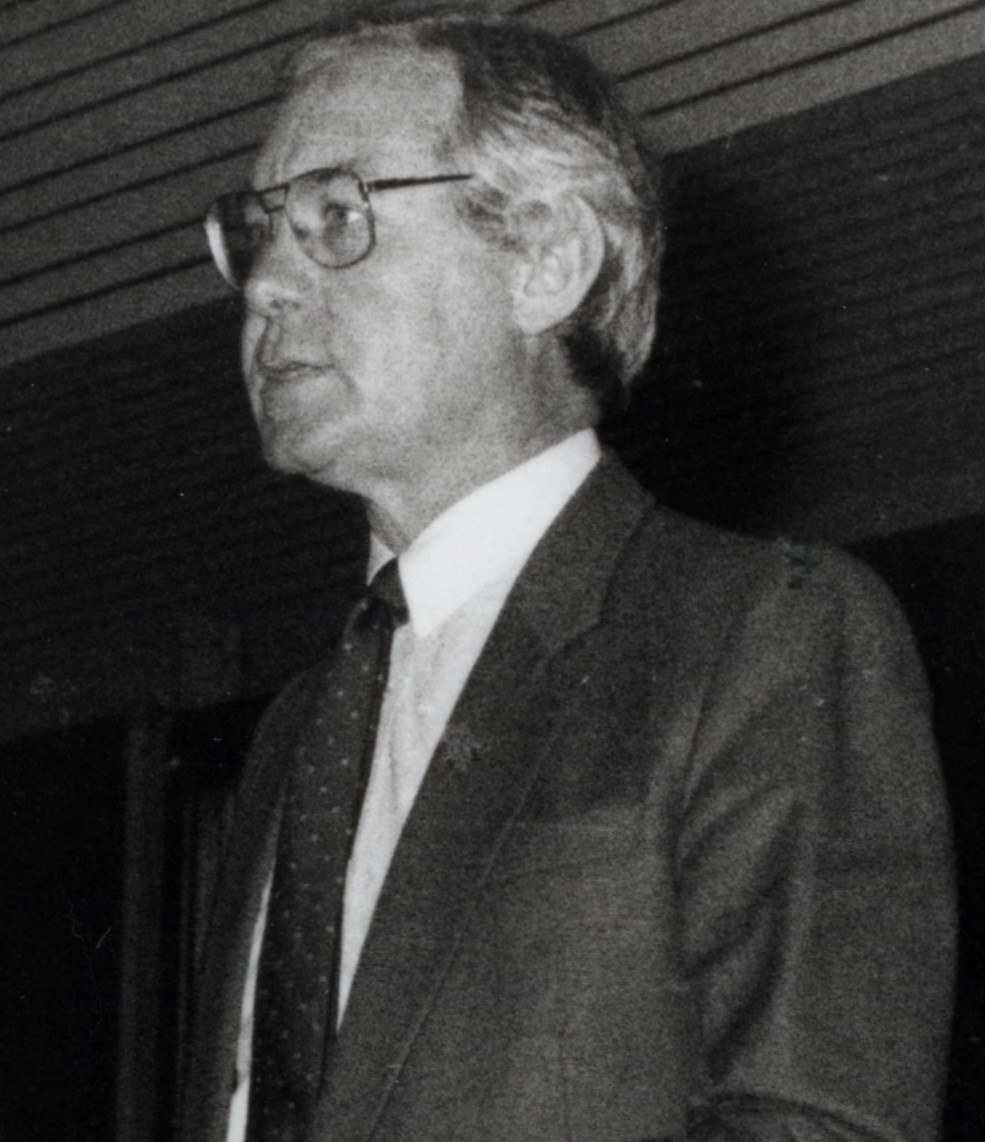
Candidate	David Lange	Russell Marshall
Popular vote	33	9
Percentage	78.57%	21.43%
Leader before election
Bill Rowling
Leader after election
David Lange

On 3 February 1983, a New Zealand Labour Party leadership election was held to determine the leadership of the New Zealand Labour Party. The leadership was won by Mangere MP David Lange, who had been Deputy Leader of the party since 1979.

== Background ==
The leadership election was instigated when Bill Rowling announced his retirement from the leadership to the Labour caucus in late 1982. Labour's caucus had been divided between the supporters and critics of Rowling. Backers of Rowling (notably Jim Anderton, Helen Clark and Fran Wilde) supported him out of their shared faith in Labour's traditional Keynesian policies which others opposed. Lange's main support were from MPs who saw Rowling as merely an impediment to their own ambitions to implement newer economic policy along globalized free market lines.

Many in both the caucus and media saw Lange as the inevitable choice as leader and so turned their attention to the question of the deputy leadership. All three candidates were from Christchurch to reflect geographical proportionality, Mike Moore MP for Papanui, Geoffrey Palmer MP for Christchurch Central and Ann Hercus MP for Lyttelton.

== Candidates ==
=== David Lange ===
After entering parliament in a 1977 by-election, Lange became Labour's rising star. He used the unusually high media attention from this to propel him to the Deputy Leadership of the Labour Party in 1979, beating Bob Tizard. Lange narrowly missed ousting Rowling in 1980, with him and his group of free market economic supporters (Roger Douglas, Michael Bassett, Richard Prebble and Mike Moore) becoming known as the "Fish and Chip Brigade" due to a picture published at the time with the group eating Fish and chips in Douglas' office after the vote. Following the coup attempt Lange resigned as deputy leader in January 1981 to offer himself for re-election as a vote of confidence. At Labour's first caucus meeting of the year he was re-elected as deputy leader. Only one vote (Tizard's) was cast against him, giving Lange a good idea of his support levels in the caucus. Since 1982 he had been Shadow Minister of Foreign Affairs. By this time Lange had become recognised by many to be more than a match for the tiring Prime Minister, Robert Muldoon, with his superb wit and debating skill.

=== Russell Marshall ===
Marshall entered Parliament in 1972 as the MP for Wanganui. He had served as Labour's Senior Whip in 1977-78 and since 1975 he had been Shadow Minister of Education. He was one of several people courted by Rowling's supporters to attempt to head off Lange. He declared his intention to run on 18 January after other potentials had pulled out. According to Michael Bassett, Marshall was the only one who remained bold enough to challenge Lange on the day of the vote.

=== Colin Moyle ===
Colin Moyle had been informed by Rowling that he intended to resign. Moyle had previously been seen as leadership potential since the 1970s, with even Muldoon considering him to be a threat to him, resulting in the infamous Moyle Affair, where Moyle ended up resigning his seat, ironically to be won by Lange. Moyle re-entered parliament in 1981 and had been Shadow Minister of Overseas Trade and Rural Banking since 1982. Moyle attempted to rally Rowling's supporters at a meeting in Auckland, though attendance was low. He took this as a sign and then informed Lange he would not stand on assurances Lange was healthy enough for the job. Moyle was mindful of Norman Kirk's health deterioration a decade earlier, but Lange said he was fighting fit.

=== Bob Tizard ===
Former Deputy Prime Minister Bob Tizard (who had coveted the leadership for years) also declared his intention to stand once Rowling announced his retirement. At the time he was ranked third in the caucus and was Shadow Minister of Finance. However, on the day of the ballot he failed to put his name forward.

== Result ==
A caucus vote was held on 3 February 1983 where Lange defeated his sole opponent Russell Marshall 33 votes to 9. With the Deputy Leadership now vacant a vote was held for that position. It was much closer with the more moderate Geoffrey Palmer (who was Lange's preferred candidate) winning by one vote, 22 to 21 over the more free market friendly Mike Moore in the second ballot. Moore had led on the first, but after Hercus was eliminated most of her supporters voted for Palmer.

=== Leadership ballot ===
Candidate	Votes	%
David Lange	33	78.57
Russell Marshall	9	21.43
Majority	24	57.14
Turnout	42	—N/a

=== Deputy-leadership ballot ===
First ballot

Candidate	Votes	%
Mike Moore	19	44.18
Geoffrey Palmer	15	34.88
Ann Hercus	9	20.93
Majority	4	9.30
Turnout	43	—N/a

Second ballot

Candidate	Votes	%
Geoffrey Palmer	22	51.17
Mike Moore	21	48.83
Majority	1	2.32
Turnout	43	—N/a

== Aftermath ==
Lange waited until 16 March before allocating portfolios to caucus, but withheld any rankings. The retiring Rowling served as Lange's Shadow Minister for Foreign Affairs while Tizard was stripped of the finance portfolio in favour of Roger Douglas, which Tizard was openly critical of. After gauging caucus feelings on the portfolio allocation, Lange then announced the rankings at the beginning of April when the parliamentary session began for the year. Lange would lead Labour until 1989 when he too resigned. Barely over a year later, during the snap election of 1984 Lange and Labour fought an excellent campaign winning a landslide victory. Labour held a 17-seat majority. At 41 years old, Lange became New Zealand's youngest prime minister of the 20th century.
