= Chester Borrows =

New Zealand politician (1957–2023)

The Honourable Chester Borrows QSO
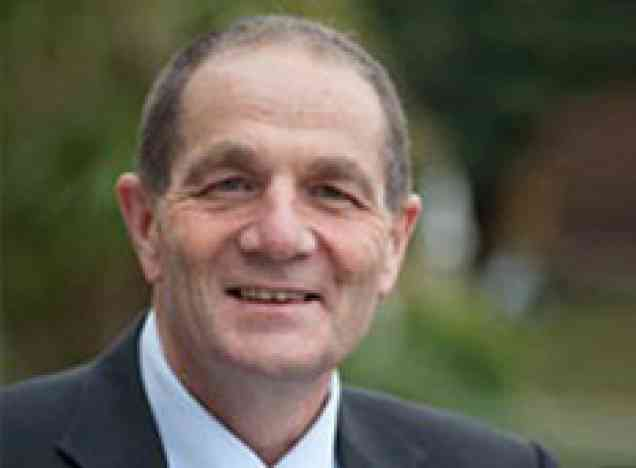

Member of the New Zealand Parliament for Whanganui
- In office 17 September 2005 – 23 September 2017
- Preceded by: Jill Pettis
- Succeeded by: Harete Hipango

Deputy Speaker of the New Zealand House of Representatives
- In office 21 October 2014 – 23 September 2017
- Preceded by: Eric Roy
- Succeeded by: Anne Tolley

7th Minister for Courts
- In office 12 December 2011 – 6 October 2014
- Prime Minister: John Key
- Preceded by: Georgina te Heuheu
- Succeeded by: Amy Adams

Personal details
- Born: Kerry James Borrows; 20 June 1957 Nelson, New Zealand
- Died: 27 February 2023 (aged 65) Hāwera, New Zealand
- Party: National

Kerry James "Chester" Borrows QSO (20 June 1957 – 27 February 2023) was a New Zealand National Party politician who served as a Member of the New Zealand Parliament (MP) from 2005 to 2017.

Borrows worked as a police officer, including as a sole charge officer, and received a Queen's Commendation for Brave Conduct for attempting to arrest an armed murderer. He first stood for Parliament in 1999, and was elected in 2005. He was a Minister outside Cabinet for three years, and was Deputy Speaker also for three years. He did not run for Parliament in 2017.

Borrows served as head of the Safe and Effective Justice Advisory Group, tasked with helping reform New Zealand's criminal justice system. He also served as an archdeacon in the Anglican Church.

== Early years ==
Born in 1957, Borrows was raised in Nelson and was educated at Nayland College. Borrows joined the New Zealand Police and worked in Nelson, Wellington and Auckland before becoming the sole charge officer in Pātea. As a police constable, he received a Queen's Commendation for Brave Conduct in 1978, for services in attempting to arrest an armed murderer.

In 2002, Borrows graduated with a Bachelor of Laws from Victoria University of Wellington, and was admitted to the bar. He subsequently worked as a lawyer in Hāwera.

== Member of Parliament ==
New Zealand Parliament
Years	Term	Electorate	List	Party
2005–2008	48th	Whanganui	33	National
2008–2011	49th	Whanganui	42	National
2011–2014	50th	Whanganui	32	National
2014–2017	51st	Whanganui	22	National

Borrows joined the National Party in 1987, having previously been a Labour supporter. He first stood for Parliament in the 1999 election, in the Whanganui electorate, but he could not unseat the incumbent, Jill Pettis of the Labour Party. Ranked 45th on the party list, he was not high enough to enter parliament. In the 2002 election, Borrows stood again in Whanganui and was ranked 36th on the party list, which was again not high enough to enter parliament. In the 2005 election, Borrows won the Whanganui electorate, defeating Pettis 15,846 electorate votes to 13,444. Borrows would go on to win the electorate in 2008, 2011, and 2014.

After the 2011 election Borrows was appointed a Minister outside Cabinet for Courts. He also received the associate portfolios of Justice and Social Development. He held these roles until 2014. After losing his ministerial role, Borrows increasingly spoke out, including against his own party. He publicly disagreed with Corrections Minister Judith Collins about her decision to stand down a gang member from his mentor work in prison. The gang member, Ngapari Nui, was a personal friend of Borrows and Collins suggested that was getting in the way of his judgement.

After the 2014 general election Borrows moved into the role of Deputy Speaker, replacing Eric Roy who had retired from the role and Parliament. Borrows was granted the style The Honourable for life by the usual convention for outgoing Ministers. Borrows broke ranks with his party in 2017 to openly condemn what he called the "discriminatory" policies of US President Donald Trump, and reiterated his support for Syrian and Muslim refugees.

Throughout his time in Parliament, Borrows was a member of eight select committees, including being the chair of the Justice and Electoral committee for three years. Borrows did not stand in the 2017 general election. According to Borrows in 2017, it was always his intention to serve only four terms. In the 2018 New Year Honours, he was appointed a Companion of the Queen's Service Order for services as a member of parliament.

== Career after Parliament ==
In 2018, Borrows was appointed head of the Safe and Effective Justice Advisory Group, which is tasked with helping reform New Zealand's criminal justice system. By June 2020 he was no longer in this role. As of 2021, Borrows was an archdeacon for the Anglican Church. His work included assisting with a restoration of St Mary's Anglican Church in Hāwera. The building closed in 2016 as it was an earthquake risk.

== Political views ==
=== Justice ===
Borrows was described in 2017 as having a "smart on crime" approach that was "at odds with those on the Right-leaning side of the House who subscribe to the 'tough on crime' school of thought." Borrows voted for the Crimes (Substituted Section 59) Amendment Act 2007), as did all National MPs. The Act removed the legal defence of "reasonable force" for parents prosecuted for assault on their children. Borrows proposed an amendment which would have legalised the use of force on children providing that it did not "cause or contribute materially to harm that is more than transitory and trifling", involve any weapon, tool or other implement, and was not "cruel, degrading, or terrifying". It was voted against by Parliament 63–58. According to Borrows, he convinced then Justice Minister Simon Power in 2008 to "take DNA off everybody arrested in the same way we can take fingerprints and photographs without having to go off and get a warrant." Borrows said in 2016 that this was what he was most proud of in his time in Parliament, saying, "that single thing's probably prevented more victims than anything we've done." Also in 2008, Borrows helped to create youth justice reforms.

In a 2019 article for The Spinoff news website Borrows condemned then-National Party leader Simon Bridges' "tough on crime" approach, saying there was no evidence it would reduce crime rates. He has argued for a more rehabilitative approach which he believed is better supported by evidence. In 2020 he publicly called for police to be equipped with body cameras, saying that they would speed up investigations and that they would provide context where police action was videoed by the public. In June 2022, Borrows criticised the National Party's proposal to ban gang patches, saying that it was "ineffectual" and was designed to attract "big headlines." He also cited the failure of previous anti-gang patch legislation which he had introduced into Parliament as a National cabinet minister and MP. In November 2022, Borrows criticised National Party leader Christopher Luxon's proposal to introduce electronic monitoring and boot camps for young offenders, arguing that better "social supports" were better solutions to addressing youth crime. Regarding youth crime, Borrows stated "I hope that we get past cliches and billboards and actually talk about the actions we need to take in a very precise manner, and how we can ensure that kids don't go down this track."

=== LGBT rights ===
Borrows voted against the Marriage (Definition of Marriage) Amendment Act of 2013 at all three readings. The bill allowed for marriage in New Zealand regardless of gender. He also supported and voted for amendments which would have allowed celebrants to be able to refuse to marry gay couples. In a speech at Parliament, Borrows said he considered "that all relationships should be treated in exactly the same way, whether they be heterosexual marriages or whether they be civil unions between heterosexual couples or gay couples, or long-term de facto relationships between heterosexual couples or gay couples." However, he also said, "My fundamental concern with this bill, as I stated earlier, is that it seeks to redefine marriage as something other than a heterosexual institution, which it has always been, albeit the odd exception when some Greek wanted to marry his manservant, and no doubt somewhere back in history someone wanted to marry some other creature from another species."

By 2016 Borrows had changed his views attending the for the 30th anniversary of the decriminalisation of homosexual act. In an opinion piece on the topic he wrote "Sometimes politicians, like everybody else, just need to let ideas and issues mature a little bit. When we were kids ours mums would knit us jerseys that were too big and we needed to grow in to them."

Borrows wrote an opinion piece in 2018 following controversial comments about homosexuals by Australian rugby player Israel Folau. In that piece, Borrows said, "Regardless of their right to say what they really think, I wonder how reflective the comments were of the principles of Mr Folau's faith. I can't see how it adds to the world for views to be expressed boldly and coldly in the way they were."

=== New Zealand history ===
After visiting Parihaka in 2018, Borrows argued that there needed to be wider teaching and acknowledgment of New Zealand history, especially regarding historical injustices committed against Māori.

=== Other positions ===
While a member of Parliament, Borrows voted for the Gambling (Gambling Harm Reduction) Amendment Bill at all three readings. The bill provided local communities with more power to determine where certain gambling machines could be located and in how the proceeds can be distributed. He voted against a bill which would have allowed all retailers in the Waitaki electorate to trade on Good Friday and Easter Sunday, but for a bill that granted territorial authorities some power to create bylaws that allow shop trading on Easter Sunday. The bill also enabled shop workers to refuse work on Easter Sunday.

== Personal life ==
His parents were lifelong socialists. He described himself as a "liberal Christian". As of 2007, he was living in Hāwera with his wife, Ella, with whom he had three children. He was a lay preacher in the Presbyterian Church. In 2007 he had a "stomach-stapling" operation to reduce weight.

He was related to MPs Chris Finlayson and Annette King through the large Russ family of Nelson.

In 2017, Borrows was found not guilty of a charge of careless driving causing injury, a charge he faced after he drove over the foot of a protester in Whanganui in 2016. In 2019, Borrows had his driving licence suspended for three months, as he had earned 100 demerit points from four speeding tickets over two years. He was later granted a limited driver's licence.

In February 2023, Borrows' daughter posted on Facebook that he had head and neck squamous-cell cancer and that his condition had worsened. He died in Hāwera on 27 February, at age 65.

New Zealand Parliament
Preceded by Jill Pettis	Member of Parliament for Whanganui; 2005–2017	Succeeded by Harete Hipango
Political offices
Preceded by Georgina te Heuheu	Minister for Courts; 2011–2014	Succeeded by Amy Adams
