= Cam Campion =

New Zealand politician (1943–1995)

Member of the New Zealand Parliament for Wanganui
- In office 27 October 1990 – 6 November 1993
- Preceded by: Russell Marshall
- Succeeded by: Jill Pettis

Personal details
- Born: 1943 Whanganui, New Zealand
- Died: 16 October 1995 (aged 51–52)
- Party: National
- Spouse: Margaret
- Children: 4

Cameron John Campion (1943 – 16 October 1995) was a New Zealand politician of the National Party.

== Member of Parliament ==
New Zealand Parliament
Years	Term	Electorate	Party
1990–93	43rd	Wanganui	National
1993	Changed allegiance to:		Independent

Campion won the seat of Wanganui from Labour in 1990; the seat had been held by Russell Marshall, who was retiring. Once in Parliament, Campion quickly became associated with Michael Laws, Hamish MacIntyre and Gilbert Myles in objecting to the monetarist policy of Ruth Richardson, known as Ruthanasia, which the fourth National Government was following. He voted against the 1991 "Mother of all Budgets" and was publicly critical of National's decision to break their election promise to remove the superannuation surcharge. When Myles and MacIntyre founded the breakaway Liberal Party Campion was widely tipped to follow them into the new party. Campion said that he had not yet given up on National and was still "flat out" trying to change National's policy direction.

He announced his resignation from the National Party on 3 March 1993, and accused the party of attempting to rig the re-selection process against him also labeling Prime Minister Jim Bolger as arrogant and intimidating and sick of his style of leadership which ignored opinions in caucus. Bolger said the allegations were a "joke" and inferred Campion lacked integrity. Campion remained an independent for the remainder of his term, up to the 1993 general election in November when he was defeated.

Before leaving parliament he drafted a private members bill to legalise voluntary euthanasia. After he exited parliament his draft was taken up by Laws who championed the unsuccessful 'Death with Dignity Bill'. Up until his death Campion campaigned for the bill and was gaining signatures for a petition seeking to put the bill to a referendum.

== Death ==
Campion had suffered from bowel cancer and in early 1995 his case was diagnosed as terminal. He died on 16 October 1995, survived by his wife Margaret and their four children.

Margaret was elected to the Wanganui District Council for the term 2001–04. In the 2019 New Year Honours, she was awarded the Queen's Service Medal, for services to the community.

New Zealand Parliament
Preceded by Russell Marshall	Member of Parliament for Wanganui; 1990–93	Succeeded by Jill Pettis
