= Roly Marks =

New Zealand politician

Rowland Oswald Colin Marks (4 February 1893 – 12 November 1977) was born in Auckland, New Zealand, and was a pioneer of the social credit movement in New Zealand.

He served in World War I as a sergeant and later second lieutenant in the New Zealand Rifle Brigade and earned the DCM. A teacher by profession, after graduating MA in 1922 from Auckland University College, Marks witnessed first-hand the difficulties faced by New Zealanders during the Depression. He became convinced that monetary reform was needed, and stood as the candidate for the Real Democracy Movement in the Wanganui electorate in the 1943 general election.

The Movement evolved into the New Zealand Social Credit Political League and Marks polled highly, though not enough to take the seat. When not running for Parliament, he served on the League's national committee and was made a life member in 1968. Marks deservedly takes credit for establishing the Social Credit movement as a force in Wanganui.
