= Henry Shafto Harrison =

New Zealand politician

New Zealand Parliament
Years	Term	Electorate	Party
1861	3rd	Wanganui	Independent
1861–1866	3rd	Wanganui	Independent
1867–1870	4th	Wanganui	Independent

Henry Shafto Harrison (1810 – 3 July 1892) was a 19th-century Member of Parliament in what was then called Wanganui, New Zealand.

== Background and migration ==
Harrison was from Yorkshire, and after graduating from Cambridge came to New Zealand with wife and surviving children on the Bolton in 1840. The family lived on St. John's Hill until 1847. Because of local unrest, they moved to a farm near Fordell, which they named "Warrengate" after their Yorkshire heritage. The locality now has a Warrengate Road and a Harrison Road. He was a lover of English sports, notably horse-racing.

== Public service ==
He fought in the New Zealand Wars. He was on the Wellington Provincial Council before representing Wanganui as an MP.

== MP for Wanganui ==
Harrison was the first winner of the newly created Wanganui electorate in the 1861 general election, but the election was declared irregular. He won the ensuing 1861 by-election, and held it to the end of the term of the 3rd New Zealand Parliament in 1866. John Bryce won the seat in the 1866 general election, but resigned in 1867. Harrison won the subsequent by-election on 27 April 1867. He represented the electorate until the end of the 4th New Zealand Parliament in 1870. He was defeated at the 1871 general election.

New Zealand Parliament
Preceded by New electoral district	Member of Parliament for Wanganui; 1861–66; 1867–70	Succeeded by John Bryce
Preceded by John Bryce	Member of Parliament for Wanganui; 1861–66; 1867–70	Succeeded by John Bryce
