= Russell Marshall =

New Zealand politician (1936–2025)

The Honourable Russell Marshall CNZM
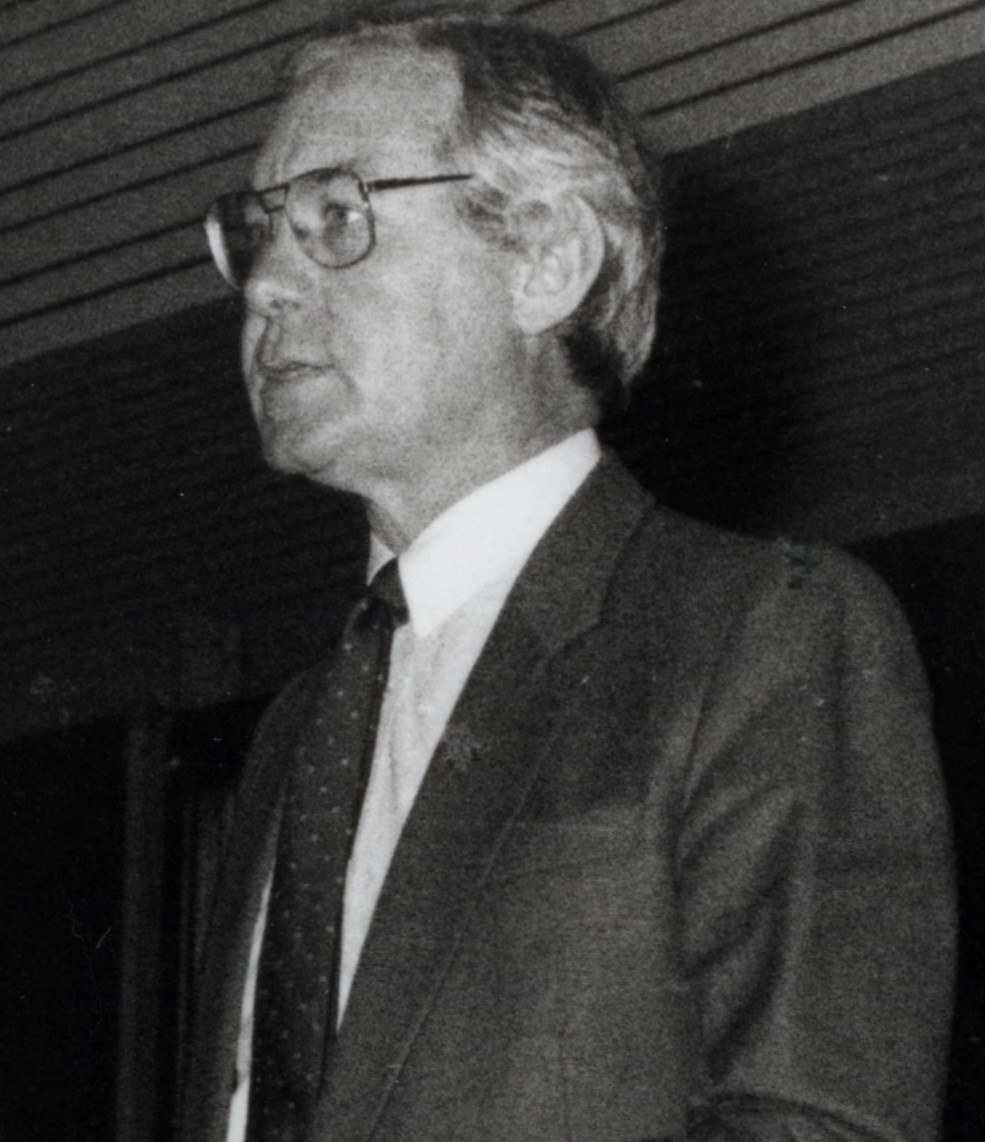
- Marshall, c. 1987

23rd High Commissioner from New Zealand to the United Kingdom
- In office 4 January 2002 – 4 January 2005
- Prime Minister: Helen Clark
- Preceded by: Paul East
- Succeeded by: Jonathan Hunt

21st Minister of Foreign Affairs
- In office 24 August 1987 – 9 February 1990
- Prime Minister: David Lange; Geoffrey Palmer
- Preceded by: David Lange
- Succeeded by: Mike Moore

1st Minister of Disarmament and Arms Control
- In office 8 June 1987 – 24 August 1989
- Prime Minister: David Lange
- Preceded by: Office Established
- Succeeded by: Fran Wilde

1st Minister of Conservation
- In office 1 April 1987 – 24 August 1987
- Prime Minister: David Lange
- Preceded by: Office Established
- Succeeded by: Helen Clark

34th Minister of Education
- In office 26 July 1984 – 24 August 1987
- Prime Minister: David Lange
- Preceded by: Merv Wellington
- Succeeded by: David Lange

6th Minister for the Environment
- In office 26 July 1984 – 17 February 1986
- Prime Minister: David Lange
- Preceded by: David Thomson
- Succeeded by: Phil Goff

Member of the New Zealand Parliament for Wanganui
- In office 25 November 1972 – 27 October 1990
- Preceded by: Bill Tolhurst
- Succeeded by: Cam Campion

Personal details
- Born: 15 February 1936 Nelson, New Zealand
- Died: 18 January 2025 (aged 88)
- Party: Labour
- Spouse: Barbara May Watson (m. 1961)
- Relations: Kerry Marshall (brother)
- Children: 3

Cedric Russell Marshall CNZM (15 February 1936 – 18 January 2025) was a New Zealand Labour Party politician and diplomat.

== Biography ==
=== Early life and career ===
Marshall was born in Nelson in 1936. His father Cedric Marshall served as secretary of the Nelson Labour Party, then as its president, and was president of the Nelson Trades Council. Russell is the older brother of Kerry Marshall, a former mayor of both Nelson and Tasman District. He attended Nelson College from 1949 to 1952. He trained as a primary school teacher at Christchurch Teachers' College (1953–54), taught in the Nelson Education Board district in 1955–56, and at Wanganui High School in 1972. He was a Methodist minister from 1960 to 1972, serving in Spreydon and Halswell, Christchurch (1960–67) and in Masterton (1967–71).

During his time as a Methodist minister Marshall became known as the "Red Reverend" after becoming known for leading protests against the Vietnam War in the 1960s. National Prime Minister Robert Muldoon resurrected the title when Marshall entered politics, frequently referring to him as such in debating exchanges.

=== Member of Parliament ===
New Zealand Parliament
Years	Term	Electorate	Party
1972–1975	37th	Wanganui	Labour
1975–1978	38th	Wanganui	Labour
1978–1981	39th	Wanganui	Labour
1981–1984	40th	Wanganui	Labour
1984–1987	41st	Wanganui	Labour
1987–1990	42nd	Wanganui	Labour

He represented the Wanganui electorate from 1972 to 1990, when he retired. In his first term in parliament he was on the education select committee where he supported the educational reforms of Phil Amos, the Minister of Education. After the surprise defeat of the Labour government in 1975 Marshall was appointed by leader Bill Rowling as Shadow Minister of Education, a significant promotion for an MP of only three years. He was also Senior Opposition Whip from 1978 to 1980. When Rowling retired in 1983 Marshall stood to replace him as party leader, but was beaten by David Lange.

Marshall was a Cabinet Minister from 1984 to 1990 during the Fourth Labour Government. He was Minister of Education, Minister for the Environment, Minister of Conservation and Minister of Disarmament and Arms Control during the government's first term (1984–87).

As Minister for the Environment Marshall inherited a campaign promise from Labour's previous environment spokesperson Michael Cullen for the wholesale reorganisation of environmental administration. He merged parts of the Department of Lands and Survey, the Forest Service and Wildlife Service into the new Department of Conservation and additionally established the Ministry for the Environment. As Minister of Education he was involved in reforming the public education system leading to the Tomorrow's Schools report. He also tackled the problem of class sizes setting a goal of recruiting 2,500 new teachers to reduce classes to a maximum of 20 students.

Despite initially intending to retire at the 1987 general election Marshall was persuaded to stand again after a personal plea from Lange. He was returned to cabinet but had a shift of responsibilities, retaining only the Disarmament and Arms Control portfolio and was additionally Minister of Foreign Affairs and Minister of Pacific Island Affairs. He held the foreign affairs portfolio during the Fijian coup d'état in September 1987 and led New Zealand's diplomatic response. He, in conjunction with the Australian government, imposed sanctions on Fiji in response to the coup and racist treatment of the Indo-Fijian populace.

=== After parliament ===
He chaired the New Zealand National Commission for UNESCO from 1990 to 1999, represented New Zealand as representative on the UNESCO Executive Board (1995–1999) and Permanent Delegate to UNESCO (1998–2000). He chaired the Finance and Administration Commission of the Executive Board in 1998–1999. He was a member of the Commonwealth Observer Mission to the Lesotho elections in 1993, and chaired the Commonwealth Observer Mission to the Seychelles elections later the same year. He chaired the Commonwealth Observer Mission to South Africa (COMSA) in 1994. From 1994 to 2002 he was chairman of the international education consultancy PINZ (Polytehnics International New Zealand) and Education New Zealand from 1998 to 2002. He was High Commissioner to the United Kingdom and Nigeria and Ambassador to Ireland (2002–2005).

He finally completed his BA degree at the Victoria University of Wellington and graduated in 1993. In 1994 he was elected to the Council of Victoria University, becoming Pro Chancellor (1999) and Chancellor (2000–2002). In 2000–2001 he chaired the Tertiary Education Advisory Commission and was later Chairman of the Tertiary Education Commission (2005–2007). In July 2007 he was elected president of the New Zealand Institute of International Affairs, a position from which he retired in 2011. He chaired the Advisory Board of Gbool (recruiting students from Arabic speaking countries) from 2011, and was a member of the Mana Education Centre Trust in Porirua.

=== Local-body candidate ===
Marshall stood as a candidate in the Porirua City Council elections in 1992 but was unsuccessful. In 2010 he stood again but this time for Mayor of Porirua but was placed 5th out of nine candidates with only 1,263 votes. The successful candidate was Nick Leggett.

== Honours ==
Marshall was awarded the Queen Elizabeth II Silver Jubilee Medal in 1977, and the New Zealand 1990 Commemoration Medal in 1990. In the 2001 New Year Honours, Marshall was appointed a Companion of the New Zealand Order of Merit, for public services.

In 1989 he was awarded an honorary doctorate from the Khon Kaen University in Thailand for services to community development.

== Personal life and death ==
Marshall married Barbara May Watson at St John's Methodist Church in Nelson in 1961. They had three children together. His brother, Kerry Marshall, married Barbara's sister, Colleen Watson.

Marshall died on 18 January 2025, at the age of 88.

== Notes ==
Political offices
Preceded by David Lange	Minister of Foreign Affairs; 1987–1990	Succeeded by Mike Moore
New title	Minister of Disarmament and Arms Control; 1987–1989	Succeeded by Fran Wilde
New title	Minister of Conservation; 1987	Succeeded by Helen Clark
Preceded by David Thomson	Minister for the Environment; 1984–1986	Succeeded by Phil Goff
Preceded by Merv Wellington	Minister of Education; 1984–1987	Succeeded by David Lange
New Zealand Parliament
Preceded by Bill Tolhurst	Member of Parliament for Wanganui; 1972–1990	Succeeded by Cam Campion
Party political offices
Preceded by Roger Drayton	Senior Whip of the Labour Party; 1978–1980	Succeeded by Jonathan Hunt
Diplomatic posts
Preceded by Paul East	High Commissioner of New Zealand to the United Kingdom; 2002–2005	Succeeded by Jonathan Hunt
