= The Wanganui Herald =

New Zealand newspaper

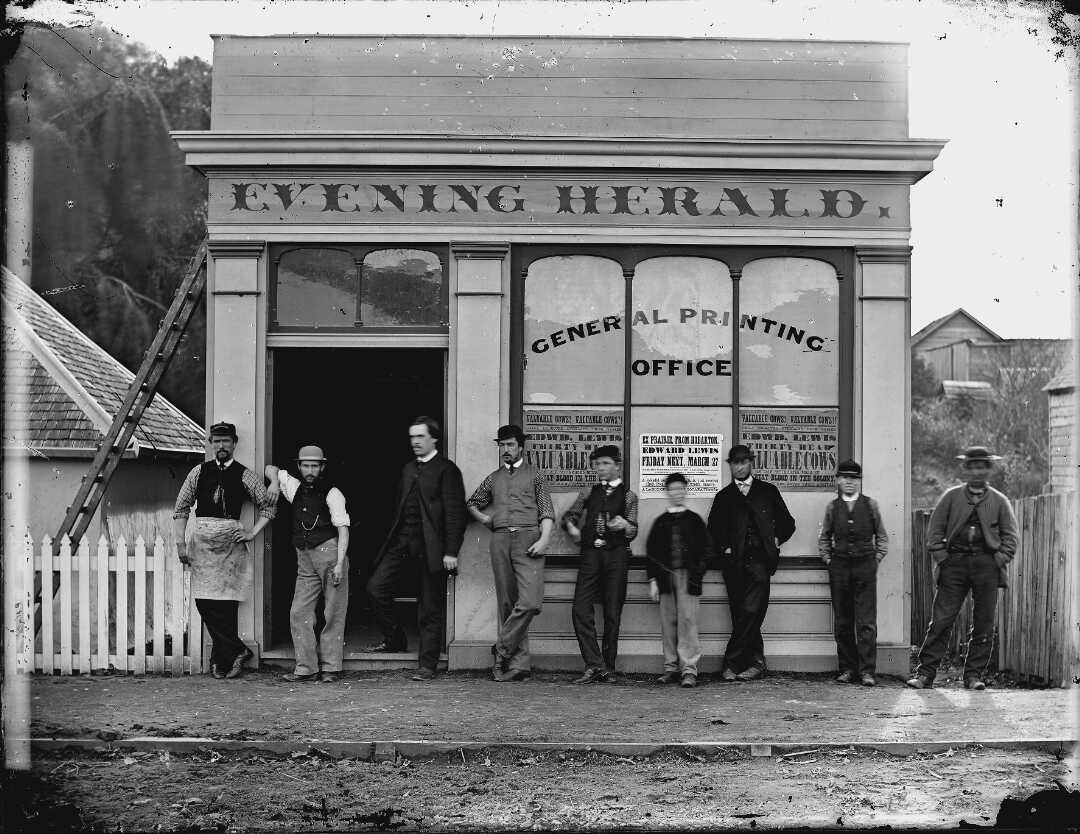
The Evening Herald staff, Wanganui, c. 1870, including John Ballance (third from left)

The Wanganui Herald, originally published as The Evening Herald, was a daily newspaper in Wanganui published from 1867 to 1986 when it was replaced by a community newspaper of the same name.

John Ballance arrived in Wanganui in August 1866; he was to become New Zealand's prime minister in 1891. Ballance aimed for a career in journalism, had strong political views, and occasionally wrote for the Wanganui Times. The established newspaper at the time was the Wanganui Chronicle founded in 1856. On 3 June 1867, Ballance published the first issue of The Evening Herald after having purchased a printing press. The last edition of The Evening Herald was published on Thursday, 23 March 1876 (volume X, issue 2737) and with issue 2738, the newspaper continued under the new title The Wanganui Herald. On the occasion of commissioning a new printing press that enabled an "enlarged paper", the title was changed with the following rationale:

A slight modification of the title has long been pressed upon us by numerous friends, who think that the word Wanganui should form part of the name, their contention being that the place from whence the paper issues should appear prominent to those at a distance. After careful consideration, and not without reluctance arising from an early bias, we have acceded to the suggestion, The Wanganui Herald being now the designation of our daily issue.

From 1869 to 1906, the evening newspaper was supplemented by a weekly edition. From 1926 onwards, The Wanganui Herald had a children's newspaper as an insert. In 1971, the ownership of The Wanganui Herald and the Wanganui Chronicle came into one company. In 1986, the period of the city having two daily newspapers came to an end with The Wanganui Herald turning into a community newspaper, leaving the commercial market to its long-standing rival, the Wanganui Chronicle. The name of the community newspaper later changed to Wanganui Midweek. Both the Chronicle and Wanganui Midweek are owned by New Zealand Media and Entertainment (NZME).
