= Carl Bates =

New Zealand politician (born 1983)

Carl Bates MP
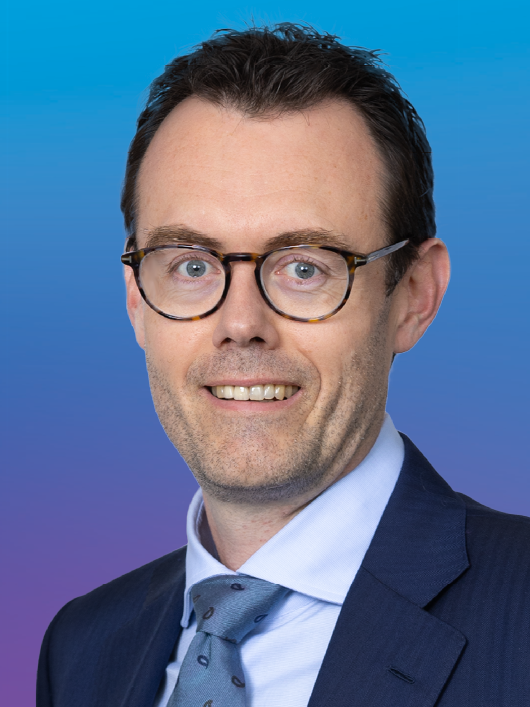
- Bates in 2023

Member of the New Zealand Parliament for Whanganui
- Incumbent
- Assumed office 14 October 2023
- Preceded by: Steph Lewis

Personal details
- Born: Carl Michael Bates; 13 March 1983 (age 43) Whanganui, New Zealand
- Party: National
- Spouse: Candice
- Children: 3
- Education: Massey University

Carl Michael Bates (born 13 March 1983) is a New Zealand politician, representing the New Zealand National Party as a Member of Parliament since the 2023 New Zealand general election.

== Early life ==
Bates was born and raised in Whanganui, where he attended Mosston School, Rutherford Junior High School, and Whanganui High School. He later gained a bachelor of business studies degree in accountancy from Massey University. He has been a director of an aged care facility, the Arena Manawatu stadium company, and the Universal College of Learning in Palmerston North. Bates set up a company to train boards of directors, named Sirdar Global Group, and operated it in New Zealand and Africa, and self-published two books on business success. He sold the company on his return to New Zealand in 2020.

== Political career ==
New Zealand Parliament
Years	Term	Electorate	List	Party
2023–2023	54th	Whanganui	47	National
2026–present	54th	Whanganui	28	National

=== First term, 2023–2026 ===
Bates joined the National Party at the age of 13, when he campaigned for Peter Gresham. In 2000 he was a Youth MP for Annabel Young. Bates was selected by the National Party to contest the Whanganui electorate at the 2023 election. He was 47th on the party list. At the time of his selection he was living in Sanson, but later moved to the Whanganui electorate. On election night, Bates received 16,446 votes, beating the incumbent, first-term Labour Party MP Steph Lewis, by 5,512 votes. Bates said the result reflected that people in Whanganui don't want their assets controlled from the capital. He said people in the region were keen to see both the Three Waters and Resource Management Act reforms reversed.

It was reported by The New Zealand Herald in September 2025 that Bates had created a trust shortly after his election as MP to transfer shares in family-run real estate investment companies he had owned. These companies owned 25 properties, a number of which were in Whanganui. These property ownerships were not disclosed on the parliamentary register of pecuniary interests. Bates has stated that the registrar of pecuniary interests, Maarten Wevers, advised him that "property held in a company whose shares are held by a trust, was not required to be declared".

On 25 September 2025 the registrar of pecuniary interests announced an investigation into Bates' declaration.

=== Second term, 2026–present ===
During the 2026 New Zealand general election, Bates contested the Whanganui electorate for National. He was ranked 28th on the National Party list.

Based on preliminary results, Bates retained the Whanganui electorate, defeating Labour candidate Angela Roberts by a margin of 6,748 votes.

== Personal life ==
Bates met his wife Candice on Tinder while living in South Africa. They have three children.

== Books ==
- Bates, Carl (5 August 2014). Traversing the avalanche: A practical guide to the implementation of effective governance for SME growth. Sirdar Press. ISBN 9780473272883.
- Bates, Carl (2011). The Laws of Extreme Business Success. Sirdar Press. ISBN 9780473183394.
