= Gilbert Carson (politician) =

New Zealand politician (1842–1924)

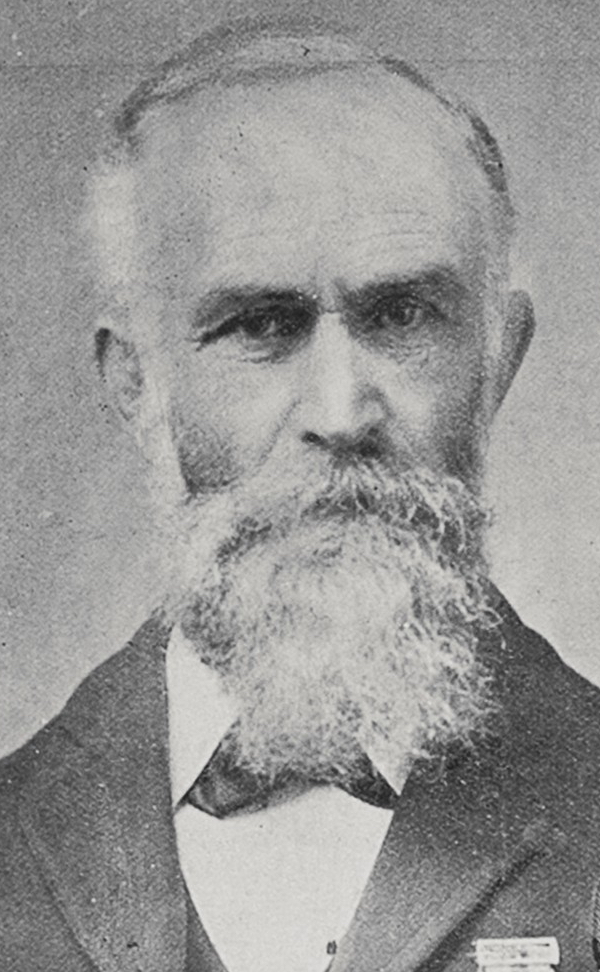

Member of the New Zealand Parliament for Wanganui
- In office 4 December 1896 – 6 December 1899
- Preceded by: Archibald Willis
- Succeeded by: Archibald Willis

Personal details
- Born: 1842 At sea
- Died: 4 March 1924 (aged 81–82) New Zealand
- Children: 4
- Occupation: Newspaper proprietor

Gilbert Carson (1842 – 4 March 1924) was a printer, soldier and Member of Parliament in New Zealand.

== Biography ==
=== Early life and career ===
Carson was born at sea in 1842 two weeks before the ship reached Auckland. His family were from Scotland and they lived in Auckland where he entered an apprenticeship in the printing trade, which he completed in 1863. He became a manager and during his tenure the printing office was destroyed by fire.

During the New Zealand Wars, he served in the Auckland volunteers, and took part in the construction of the Wairoa redoubt. He remained on active service at Wairoa and was later awarded the New Zealand War Medal.

In 1867 he moved to Wellington and worked at the Government Printing Office until 1874 when he purchased the Wanganui Chronicle. Carson owned and edited the Chronicle. Ill health saw him relinquish active management of the paper.

=== Political career ===
New Zealand Parliament
Years	Term	Electorate	Party
1896–1899	13th	Wanganui	Conservative

He was a Mayor of Wanganui for three consecutive terms. He was also the chairman of the Wanganui Harbour Board, Hospital Board, Girls' College Board of Governors, Library Committee and Museum Trustees.

He unsuccessfully contested the Wanganui electorate in the 1890 election. He was elected to the Wanganui electorate in the 1896 general election, and was defeated in 1899. On the issue of alcohol, he was a prohibitionist.

In 1914, he was appointed to the Legislative Council and served one term until 1921.

=== Death ===
Carson died on 4 March 1924. His wife and eldest son predeceased him. He was survived by his younger son and two daughters.

== Notes ==
New Zealand Parliament
Preceded by Archibald Willis	Member of Parliament for Wanganui; 1896–1899	Succeeded by Archibald Willis
