= Hoani Wiremu Hīpango =

New Zealand Māori leader (c. 1820–1865)

Hoani Wiremu Hīpango (c. 1820 – 25 February 1865) was a Māori tribal leader, teacher and assessor of the Whanganui River area of New Zealand. He was a leader of Ngāti Tumango, of the Te Āti Haunui-a-Pāpārangi iwi. He converted to Christianity and was baptised at Putiki, near present-day Whanganui, in 1841. He visited England with missionary Richard Taylor in 1855. He opposed the Pai Mārire (Hauhau) movement in the 1860s and led anti-Hauhau forces in battle. In February 1865, he led an attack on a Hauhau pā near Pipiriki. They captured the pā, but Hīpango was seriously injured and died of his wounds two days later, on 25 February, at the age of about 45. He was buried at Korokata hill, overlooking Pūtiki.
