= Putiki =

Suburb of Whanganui

- Suburb
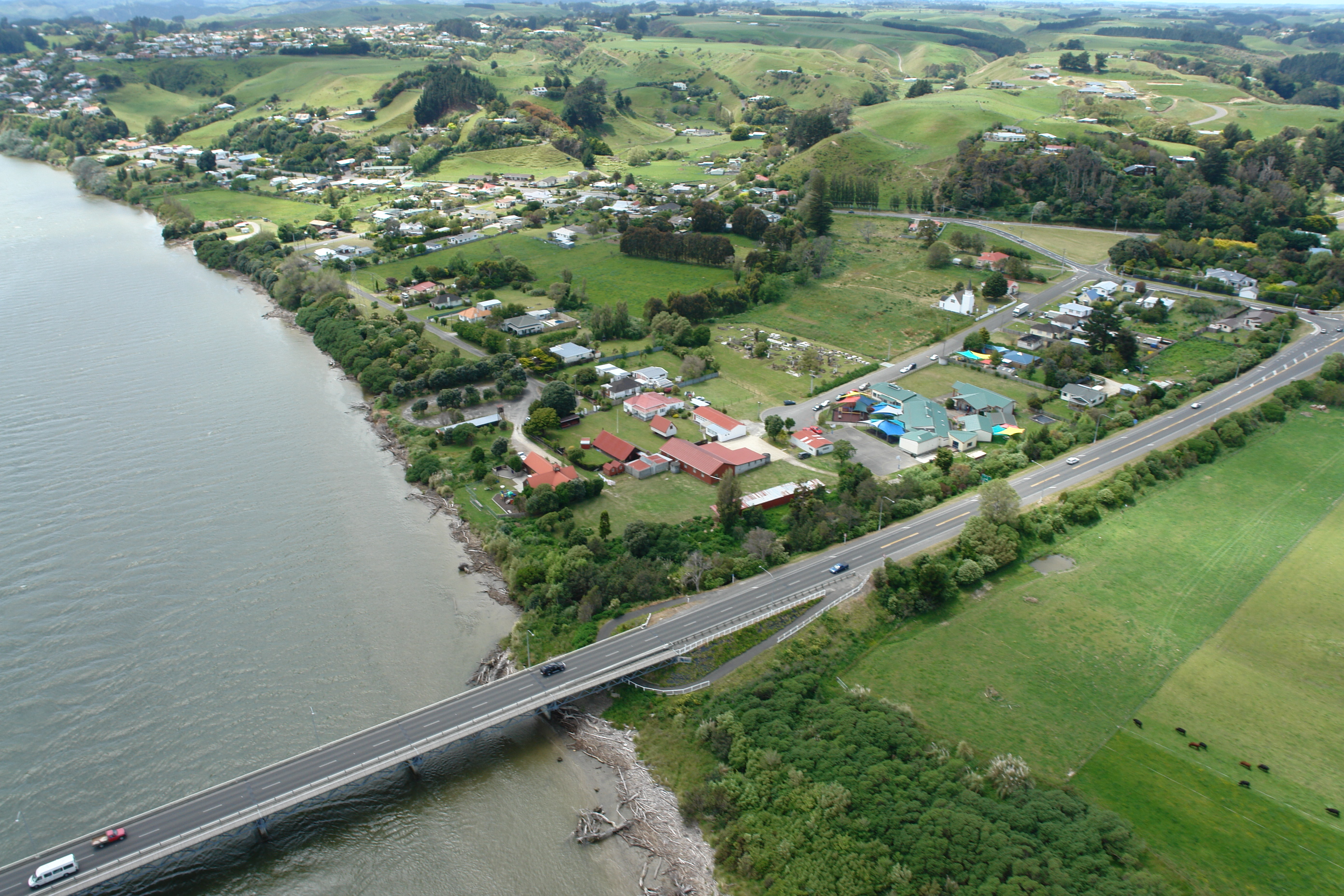
- Putiki Village & Pa in 2007
- Interactive map of Putiki
- Coordinates: 39°56′45″S 175°03′05″E
- Country: New Zealand
- City: Whanganui
- Local authority: Whanganui District Council

Area
  - Land: 335 ha (830 acres)

Population (June 2025)
  - Total: 770
  - Density: 230/km^{2} (600/sq mi)

(Whanganui River) Whanganui Central		Durie Hill
(Whanganui River) Gonville	Putiki
Whanganui Airport		Marybank

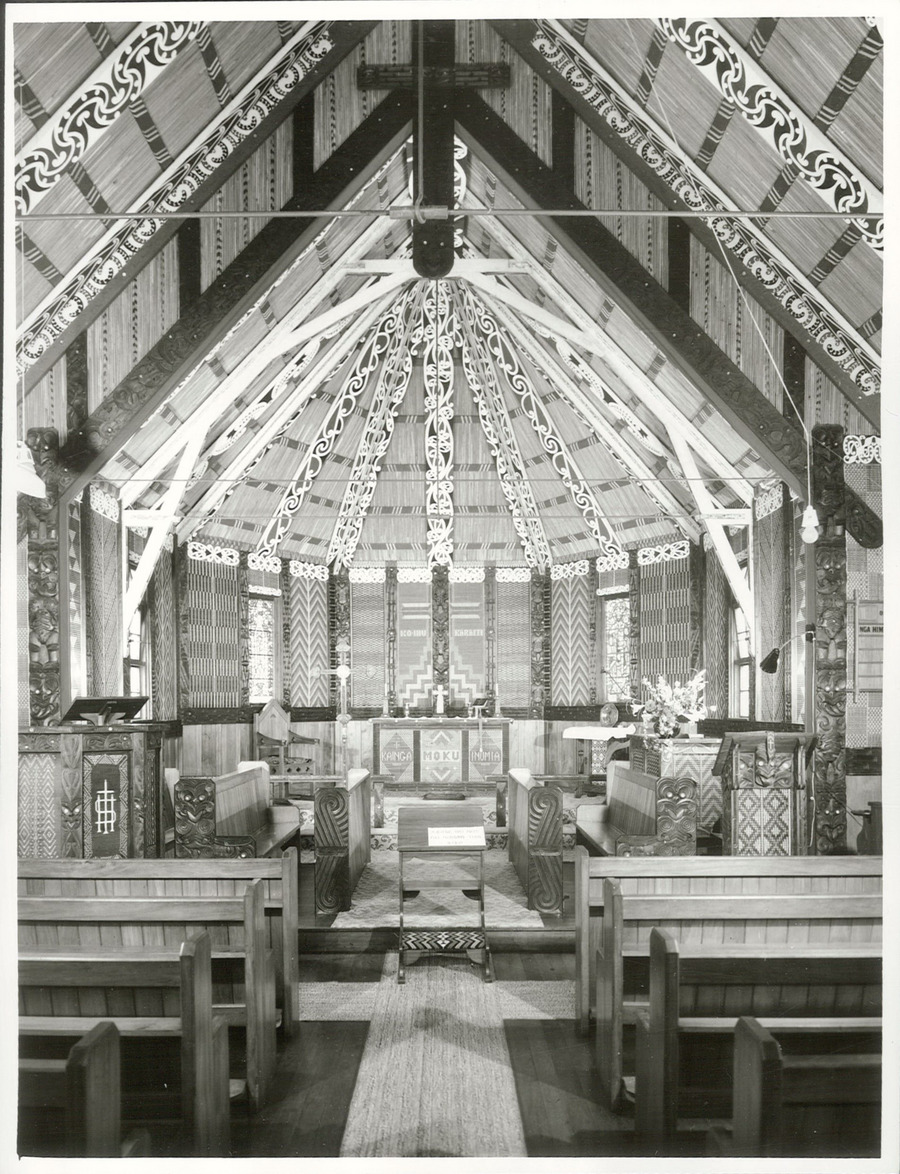
St. Pauls Church Putiki in 1992

Putiki is a settlement in the Whanganui District and Manawatū-Whanganui region of New Zealand's North Island, located across the Whanganui River from Whanganui city. It includes the intersection of State Highway 3 and State Highway 4.

The settlement was established around Pūtiki Pā, a tribal meeting ground of Ngāti Tumango and Ngāti Tupoho. It features Te Paku o Te Rangi meeting house, also known as Aotea meeting house.

== History ==
=== 19th century ===
Pūtiki Pā, recorded variously as Putiki Wharanui, Putiki Wharenui, Putiki Warenui, or by its full name Putiki-wharanui-a-Tamatea-pokai-whenua, as a well established pā well before European arrival.

The settlement was attacked by Ngāti Toa in a bloody two-month siege in 1828 or 1829. About 400 locals were killed in the encounter.

Pūtiki was the main Māori settlement at the Whanganui River mouth when Europeans began settling on the river in the 1840s. Māori from Pūtiki signed a deed of purchase with Edward Gibbon Wakefield for the Wanganui township, but chiefs later said they did not consider the deed to be significant.

A Church Missionary Society mission station was established next to the settlement in 1841. Many leaders converted to Christianity, including Hōri Kīngi Te Ānaua and Hoani Wiremu Hīpango.

Missionary Richard Taylor oversaw the establishment of the region's first mill at Awarua Stream in 1845 (built by Tom Higgie). Wheat was locally grown, milled into flour and used to make bread, a staple of the colonial era diet.

Europeans formed the Wanganui township across the river. The people of Pūtiki had strong economic links with the new settlement and had a protective attitude towards it.

Pūtiki Māori fought alongside the Crown against Māori further upriver in 1847, capturing six men who had killed local farmer John Alexander Gilfillan's wife Mary and three of their children. They also fought alongside the Crown in 1864, in another battle against upriver Pai Mārire Māori on Moutoa Island, to protect the European township. The following year, European women gave Pūtiki Māori a large flag to celebrate the victory.

A photograph held by the National Library of New Zealand reportedly shows Pūtiki Māori meeting with Governor George Grey during a hui at the pā in 1864.

In 1986, Mete Kīngi Paetahi, a Ngāti Poutama chief from Pūtiki, became the first MP for the Western Māori electorate.

=== 20th century ===
Two platoons of the Māori Battalion were welcomed back to Pūtiki Pā in May 1919 after fighting in the Gallipoli campaign and on the Western Front during World War I. They were the only battalion to return to New Zealand as a complete unit, and were welcomed back with rousing parades and receptions across the country. The Moutoa flag from 1865 flew at the event.

On 5 December 1937 Bishop F.A. Bennett consecrated Saint Paul's Memorial Church on the site of the original 1841 Christian mission. It was the fifth church on the site; the previous four had been destroyed by fire, by a flood, by an earthquake, and by dry rot.

The church was built as a memorial to those who had served the Anglican Church since the mission was first established.

The church is plain and conventional on the outside, but the inside features extensive Māori carvings and artwork. Sir Āpirana Ngata brought tutors and student carvers to create the carvings, and four women were sent to Wellington learn harakeke tukutuku weaving patterns.

On 22 December 1963 Governor-General Sir Bernard Fergusson unveiled a framed memorial cross at the church, dedicated to local Māori and Europeans who had died in both world wars. The cross is now displayed on the church porch, under a memorial plaque to Te Teira and Henare Metekingi who died in World War I.

=== 21st century ===
In October 2020, the Government committed $239,367 from the Provincial Growth Fund to upgrade Pūtiki Pā and associated marae sites, creating 50 jobs.

== Demographics ==
Putiki covers 3.35 km^{2} (1.29 sq mi) and had an estimated population of 770 as of June 2025, with a population density of 230 people per km^{2}.

Historical population
Year	Pop.	±% p.a.
2006	594	—
2013	579	−0.36%
2018	666	+2.84%
2023	741	+2.16%

Putiki had a population of 741 in the 2023 New Zealand census, an increase of 75 people (11.3%) since the 2018 census, and an increase of 162 people (28.0%) since the 2013 census. There were 363 males and 378 females in 285 dwellings. 1.2% of people identified as LGBTIQ+. The median age was 50.1 years (compared with 38.1 years nationally). There were 117 people (15.8%) aged under 15 years, 105 (14.2%) aged 15 to 29, 348 (47.0%) aged 30 to 64, and 171 (23.1%) aged 65 or older.

People could identify as more than one ethnicity. The results were 74.5% European (Pākehā); 36.4% Māori; 2.0% Pasifika; 4.0% Asian; 0.4% Middle Eastern, Latin American and African New Zealanders (MELAA); and 2.8% other, which includes people giving their ethnicity as "New Zealander". English was spoken by 96.8%, Māori by 10.5%, and other languages by 5.3%. No language could be spoken by 2.0% (e.g. too young to talk). New Zealand Sign Language was known by 1.2%. The percentage of people born overseas was 11.3, compared with 28.8% nationally.

Religious affiliations were 36.4% Christian, 3.2% Māori religious beliefs, 1.2% Buddhist, and 0.4% other religions. People who answered that they had no religion were 52.2%, and 6.9% of people did not answer the census question.

Of those at least 15 years old, 108 (17.3%) people had a bachelor's or higher degree, 375 (60.1%) had a post-high school certificate or diploma, and 138 (22.1%) people exclusively held high school qualifications. The median income was $41,900, compared with $41,500 nationally. 60 people (9.6%) earned over $100,000 compared to 12.1% nationally. The employment status of those at least 15 was 312 (50.0%) full-time, 81 (13.0%) part-time, and 12 (1.9%) unemployed.

== Education ==
Te Kura Kaupapa Māori o Te Atihaunui-A-Paparangi is a co-educational state Māori language immersion primary school for Year 1 to 8 students, with a roll of 126 as of July 2026. It opened in 1991 and moved to its current site in 1993.

== Notable people ==
- Hoani Wiremu Hīpango, tribal leader and teacher, baptised at Putiki in 1841, buried nearby in 1865
- Ulric Williams (1890–1971), doctor and naturopath
