= Jill Pettis =

New Zealand politician

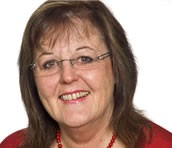

Member of the New Zealand Parliament for Whanganui
- In office 1993–2005
- Preceded by: Cam Campion
- Succeeded by: Chester Borrows

Personal details
- Born: 22 September 1952 (age 73)
- Party: Labour (1968–present)
- Children: 2
- Profession: Nurse

Marjorie Jill Pettis (born 22 September 1952) is a New Zealand politician, and a member of the Labour Party.

== Biography ==
=== Early life ===
Pettis was born on 22 September 1952. Before entering politics, she worked as a nurse and as a finance officer at a bank. Pettis is of Māori descent.

=== Political career ===
New Zealand Parliament
Years	Term	Electorate	List	Party
1993–1996	44th	Wanganui		Labour
1996–1999	45th	Whanganui	14	Labour
1999–2002	46th	Whanganui	24	Labour
2002–2005	47th	Whanganui	27	Labour
2005–2008	48th	List	24	Labour

Pettis became a member of the Labour Party in 1968.

Pettis became MP for Wanganui in the 1993 election, but in 2005 she narrowly lost the seat to National's Chester Borrows. She was returned to Parliament as a list MP, at which point she stepped down as the Labour Party's Senior Whip to focus on winning back the Whanganui seat.

She also served as Assistant Speaker of the House.

She retired from politics prior to the 2008 general election.

== Personal life ==
Pettis is married with two children.

New Zealand Parliament
Preceded by Cam Campion	Member of Parliament for Whanganui; 1993–2005	Succeeded by Chester Borrows
Party political offices
Preceded by David Benson-Pope	Senior Whip of the Labour Party; 2004–2005	Succeeded by Tim Barnett
