= Whanganui (electorate) =

- Single-member general constituency for the New Zealand House of Representatives
- Interactive map of boundaries from the 2026 election
- Formation: 1860
- Region: Manawatū-Whanganui and Taranaki
- Character: Urban
- Term: 3 years

Member for Whanganui
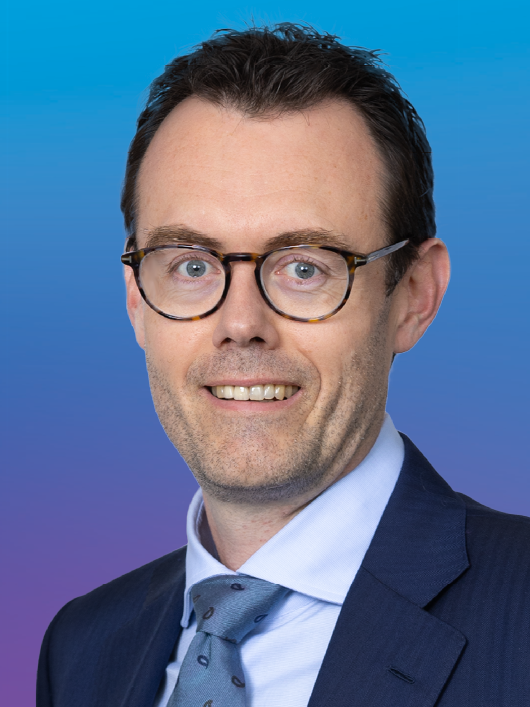
- Carl Bates since 14 October 2023
- Party: National
- Previous MP: Steph Lewis (Labour)
Party vote distribution

Whanganui (known as Wanganui until 1996) is a New Zealand parliamentary electorate. It was first established in 1860 for the 3rd Parliament, and has existed continuously since then.

It is held by Carl Bates of the National Party, who won it in the 2023 general election.

== Establishment ==
In the 1860 electoral redistribution, the House of Representatives increased the number of representatives by 12, reflecting the immense population growth since the original electorates were established in 1853. The redistribution created 15 additional electorates, with between one and three members, and the Wanganui and Rangitikei electorate was split into two separate electorates: the Rangitikei electorate, and the Wanganui electorate, with one member each.

== Population centres ==
Map of boundaries at the 2020 and 2023 general elections

The current electorate is based on the urban area of Whanganui, the town of Hāwera, and smaller centres Kaponga, Eltham, Normanby, Manaia, Pātea and Waverley; broadly speaking, the Whanganui and South Taranaki local government districts. The 2025 boundary review added the Ruapehu District towns of Raetihi, Ohakune, Waiouru, Waimarino and Ōwhango, and the Tongariro National Park.

== History ==
Henry Shafto Harrison was the first representative. His 7 February 1861 election was declared invalid. He stood again in the 1861 by-election and was elected again. He then served the electorate until the end of the term in 1866.

Harrison, John Bryce and John Garner contested the 1866 election. The nomination meeting was held on Friday, 2 March 1866. Harrison, Bryce and Garner received 51, 102 and 7 votes, respectively, at the election on the following day. Bryce was thus declared elected. Bryce resigned in 1867.

The resulting 6 May 1867 by-election was won by Harrison, and he served until the dissolution of Parliament on 30 December 1870.

Bryce was again elected in the 30 January 1871 election. This time, he served three parliamentary terms until the dissolution in November 1881.

Wanganui became a two-member electorate for the 12 January 1876 election. Apart from Bryce, Julius Vogel was elected, who was later to become Premier. Vogel resigned on 9 September 1876.

The resulting 2 October 1876 by-election was won by William Fox, resulting in his second period of representation of a Whanganui-centred electorate. He served until the end of the term on 15 August 1879.

Bryce and John Ballance won the 1879 election. They both served until the end of the term, with Parliament being dissolved on 8 November 1881.

For the 1881 election, the electorate reverted to being represented by a single member. The election, held on 9 December, was won by William Hogg Watt. He served until the end of the term, with Parliament being dissolved on 27 June 1884.

The 1884 election was once again won by John Ballance. This time, he would serve in three successive Parliaments. He died in office on 27 April 1893 during the 11th Parliament. Ballance formed the Liberal Party after the 1890 election and became its leader, and thus introduced party politics to New Zealand. The Liberal Government of New Zealand would last for 21 years and is the longest serving government in New Zealand's history.

Ballance's death triggered the 1893 by-election, which was held on 13 June and won by Archibald Willis, who was re-elected at the 1893 election a few months later.

Gilbert Carson was successful in the 1896 election. He served one term. He was succeeded by Willis in the 1899 election, who served two more terms for the electorate.

James Thomas Hogan won the 1905 election. He served two terms and was defeated in the 1911 election by Bill Veitch.

Veitch had a long career in the electorate, serving until 1935, when he defeated. He was initially an independent, but joined the Liberal Party in 1925, and changed to the United Party in 1928.

Joe Cotterill won the electorate in the 1935 election for the Labour Party. He also had a long career, retiring in 1960 from the Wanganui seat.

He was succeeded by his party colleague George Spooner in the 1960 election, who served three terms and was defeated in 1969 election by Bill Tolhurst from the National Party.

Tolhurst served one term and at the 1972 election, the electorate returned to Labour. Russell Marshall served six terms and retired in 1990.

In the 1990 election, Cam Campion secured the seat for National. He retired in 1993 and died two years after that.

The seat returned to Labour again, with Jill Pettis winning the 1993 election. She was the first woman to represent Wanganui. She served four terms, until her defeat in the 2005 election by Chester Borrows of the National Party. Pettis served an additional term as a List MP until 2008. Borrows announced in 2016 that he would not seek reelection at the 2017 general election and the seat was won by Harete Hipango, retaining it for the National Party. She however, was defeated after one term by Labour's Steph Lewis.

Several members (Fox, Vogel and Ballance) became Premier. Terry Heffernan stood in the electorate five times for four parties, from 1981 to 1993.

=== Members of Parliament ===
Unless otherwise stated, all MPs terms began and ended at a general election.

Key

Independent Liberal Conservative Liberal–Labour

Independent Labour United Labour United Labour National

==== single-member electorate ====
Election	Winner
1861 election	Henry Harrison
1861 by-election	Henry Harrison
1866 election	John Bryce
1867 by-election	Henry Harrison (2nd time)
1871 election	John Bryce (2nd time)

==== multi-member electorate ====
Election	Winners	
1876 election	John Bryce	Julius Vogel
1876 by-election	John Bryce	William Fox
1879 election	John Bryce	John Ballance

==== single-member electorate ====
Election	Winner
1881 election	William Watt
1884 election	John Ballance (2nd time)
1887 election	John Ballance (2nd time)
1890 election	John Ballance (2nd time)
1893 by-election	Archibald Willis
1893 election	Archibald Willis
1896 election	Gilbert Carson
1899 election	Archibald Willis (2nd time)
1902 election	Archibald Willis (2nd time)
1905 election	James Thomas Hogan
1908 election	James Thomas Hogan
1911 election	Bill Veitch
1914 election	Bill Veitch
1919 election	Bill Veitch
1922 election	Bill Veitch
1925 election	Bill Veitch
1928 election	Bill Veitch
1931 election	Bill Veitch
1935 election	Joe Cotterill
1938 election	Joe Cotterill
1943 election	Joe Cotterill
1946 election	Joe Cotterill
1949 election	Joe Cotterill
1951 election	Joe Cotterill
1954 election	Joe Cotterill
1957 election	Joe Cotterill
1960 election	George Spooner
1963 election	George Spooner
1966 election	George Spooner
1969 election	Bill Tolhurst
1972 election	Russell Marshall
1975 election	Russell Marshall
1978 election	Russell Marshall
1981 election	Russell Marshall
1984 election	Russell Marshall
1987 election	Russell Marshall
1990 election	Cam Campion
1993 election	Jill Pettis
1996 election	Jill Pettis
1999 election	Jill Pettis
2002 election	Jill Pettis
2005 election	Chester Borrows
2008 election	Chester Borrows
2011 election	Chester Borrows
2014 election	Chester Borrows
2017 election	Harete Hipango
2020 election	Steph Lewis
2023 election	Carl Bates

=== List MPs ===
Members of Parliament elected from party lists in elections where that person also unsuccessfully contested the electorate. Unless otherwise stated, all MPs terms began and ended at general elections.

Election	Winner
1996 election	Peter Gresham
2005 election	Jill Pettis
2021	Harete Hipango (Note: Hipango entered Parliament on 11 June 2021, following the resignation of Nick Smith.)

== Election results ==
=== 2026 election ===
The next election will be held on 7 November 2026. Candidates for Whanganui are listed at Candidates in the 2026 New Zealand general election by electorate § Whanganui. Official results will be available after 27 November 2026.

=== 2023 election ===
2023 general election: Whanganui
Notes:	Blue background denotes the winner of the electorate vote. Pink background denotes a candidate elected from their party list. Yellow background denotes an electorate win by a list member, or other incumbent. A ✓ or ✗ denotes status of any incumbent, win or lose respectively.						
Party	Candidate	Votes	%	±%	Party votes	%	±%
National	Carl Bates	18,484	47.10	+12.73	14,567	36.80	+10.59
Labour	✗ Steph Lewis	12,972	33.05	–21.72	11,002	27.79	–23.60
NZ First	William Arnold	3,139	7.99	—	4,494	11.35	+8.04
Green	Marion Sanson	2,049	5.22	+1.59	2,980	7.52	+2.67
ACT	Craig Dredge	1,683	4.28	—	3,749	9.47	+1.58
Animal Justice	Sandra Kyle	402	1.02	—	99	0.25	—
Te Pāti Māori					602	1.52	+0.98
NZ Loyal					544	1.37	—
Opportunities					463	1.16	+0.22
NewZeal					315	0.79	+0.33
Legalise Cannabis					214	0.54	+0.06
New Conservatives					105	0.26	–1.41
Freedoms NZ					88	0.22	—
DemocracyNZ					77	0.19	—
Women's Rights					30	0.07	—
Leighton Baker Party					20	0.05	—
New Nation					17	0.04	—
Informal votes		511			210		
Total valid votes		39,240			39,576		
National gain from Labour	Majority	5,512	14.04	–5.92			

=== 2020 election ===
2020 general election: Whanganui
Notes:	Blue background denotes the winner of the electorate vote. Pink background denotes a candidate elected from their party list. Yellow background denotes an electorate win by a list member, or other incumbent. A ✓ or ✗ denotes status of any incumbent, win or lose respectively.						
Party	Candidate	Votes	%	±%	Party votes	%	±%
Labour	Steph Lewis	22,299	54.32	+13.98	21,228	51.39	+14.95
National	✗ Harete Hipango	14,108	34.37	−10.54	10,828	26.21	−18.52
Green	Alan Clay	1,491	3.63	−1.91	2,004	4.85	+0.15
New Conservative	Johnathan Marshall	784	1.91	—	690	1.67	+1.42
Advance NZ	Charlotte Weber	773	1.88	—	531	1.28	—
Independent	Hillary Kieft	367	0.89	—			
Social Credit	Heather Marion Smith	188	0.46	—	63	0.46	+0.41
ACT					3,260	7.89	+7.45
NZ First					1,368	3.31	−6.71
Opportunities					390	0.94	−0.75
Māori Party					222	0.54	+0.11
Legalise Cannabis					198	0.48	+0.07
ONE					189	0.46	—
Outdoors					43	0.10	+0.03
Sustainable NZ					24	0.06	—
Vision NZ					10	0.02	—
TEA					5	0.01	—
Heartland					2	0.00	—
Informal votes		1,035			253		
Total valid votes		41,045			41,308		
Labour gain from National	Majority	8,191	19.96	+24.53			

=== 2017 election ===
2017 general election: Whanganui
Notes:	Blue background denotes the winner of the electorate vote. Pink background denotes a candidate elected from their party list. Yellow background denotes an electorate win by a list member, or other incumbent. A ✓ or ✗ denotes status of any incumbent, win or lose respectively.						
Party	Candidate	Votes	%	±%	Party votes	%	±%
National	Harete Hipango	16,751	44.91	−8.24	16,874	44.73	−2.4
Labour	Steph Lewis	15,045	40.34	+0.03	13,748	36.44	+10.99
NZ First	Reg Skipworth	2,580	6.92	—	3,783	10.02	−1.9
Green	Nicola Patrick	2,067	5.54	—	1,775	4.70	−2.49
ACT	Alan Davidson	294	0.79	+0.07	168	0.44	−0.03
Opportunities					639	1.69	—
Māori Party					162	0.43	−0.15
Legalise Cannabis					154	0.41	−0.13
Conservative					94	0.25	−4.75
Ban 1080					56	0.15	−0.01
Outdoors					25	0.07	—
People's Party					23	0.06	—
United Future					23	0.06	−0.15
Democrats					20	0.05	−0.11
Mana					12	0.03	−0.7 (Note: 2017 Mana Party swing is relative to the votes for Internet-Mana in 2014; it shared a party list with the Internet Party in the 2014 election)
Internet					7	0.02	−0.71 (Note: 2017 Internet Party swing is relative to the votes for Internet-Mana in 2014; it shared a party list with Mana Party in the 2014 election)
Informal votes		560			161		
Total valid votes		37,297			37,724		
National hold	Majority	1,706	4.57	−8.27			

=== 2014 election ===
2014 general election: Whanganui
Notes:	Blue background denotes the winner of the electorate vote. Pink background denotes a candidate elected from their party list. Yellow background denotes an electorate win by a list member, or other incumbent. A ✓ or ✗ denotes status of any incumbent, win or lose respectively.						
Party	Candidate	Votes	%	±%	Party votes	%	±%
National	✓ Chester Borrows	18,649	53.15	−0.54	16,687	47.13	−0.43
Labour	Hamish McDouall	14,144	40.31	+2.80	9,012	25.45	−1.96
Conservative	Kim MacIntyre	872	2.49	+2.49	1,771	5.00	+1.77
Māori Party	Nancy Tuaine	610	1.74	+1.74	205	0.58	+0.13
ACT	Alan Daniel Davidson	252	0.72	+0.29	167	0.47	−0.61
Democrats	Heather Marion Smith	208	0.59	+0.20	57	0.16	+0.01
NZ First					4,221	11.92	+2.39
Green					2,546	7.19	−1.77
Internet Mana					259	0.73	+0.49
Legalise Cannabis					190	0.54	−0.01
United Future					75	0.21	−0.24
Ban 1080					56	0.16	+0.16
Civilian					22	0.06	+0.06
Focus					14	0.04	+0.04
Independent Coalition					13	0.04	+0.04
Informal votes		350			112		
Total valid votes		35,085			35,407		
National hold	Majority	4,505	12.84	−3.34			

=== 2011 election ===
2011 general election: Whanganui
Notes:	Blue background denotes the winner of the electorate vote. Pink background denotes a candidate elected from their party list. Yellow background denotes an electorate win by a list member, or other incumbent. A ✓ or ✗ denotes status of any incumbent, win or lose respectively.						
Party	Candidate	Votes	%	±%	Party votes	%	±%
National	✓ Chester Borrows	16,743	53.69	−2.61	15,151	47.56	+1.25
Labour	Hamish McDouall	11,697	37.51	−0.10	8,733	27.41	−8.10
Green	John Milnes	1,444	4.63	+0.19	2,855	8.96	+3.68
NZ First	Ian Brougham	1,043	3.34	+3.34	3,035	9.53	+4.39
ACT	Alan Daniel Davidson	135	0.43	−0.56	345	1.08	−1.99
Democrats	Heather Marion Smith	121	0.39	−0.28	47	0.15	−0.07
Conservative					1,030	3.23	-+3.23
Māori Party					225	0.71	−0.29
Legalise Cannabis					176	0.55	+0.21
United Future					143	0.45	−0.20
Mana					75	0.24	+0.24
Libertarianz					22	0.07	+0.02
Alliance					21	0.07	−0.02
Informal votes		616			235		
Total valid votes		31,183			31,858		
National hold	Majority	5,046	16.18	−2.51			

Electorate (as at 11 November 2011): 43,350

=== 2008 election ===
2008 general election: Whanganui
Notes:	Blue background denotes the winner of the electorate vote. Pink background denotes a candidate elected from their party list. Yellow background denotes an electorate win by a list member, or other incumbent. A ✓ or ✗ denotes status of any incumbent, win or lose respectively.						
Party	Candidate	Votes	%	±%	Party votes	%	±%
National	✓ Chester Borrows	19,072	56.30		15,869	46.30	
Labour	Hamish McDouall	12,739	37.61		12,170	35.51	
Green	John Milnes	1,503	4.44		1,809	5.28	
ACT	Alan Davidson	336	0.99		1,052	3.07	
Democrats	Heather Marion Smith	225	0.66		73	0.21	
NZ First					1,761	5.14	
Māori Party					342	1.00	
Progressive					253	0.74	
Bill and Ben					249	0.73	
United Future					224	0.65	
Kiwi					186	0.54	
Legalise Cannabis					116	0.34	
Family Party					91	0.27	
Alliance					28	0.08	
Libertarianz					18	0.05	
Workers Party					16	0.05	
Pacific					10	0.03	
RONZ					3	0.01	
RAM					2	0.01	
Informal votes		304			162		
Total valid votes		33,875			34,272		
National hold	Majority	6,333					

=== 2005 election ===
2005 general election: Whanganui
Notes:	Blue background denotes the winner of the electorate vote. Pink background denotes a candidate elected from their party list. Yellow background denotes an electorate win by a list member, or other incumbent. A ✓ or ✗ denotes status of any incumbent, win or lose respectively.						
Party	Candidate	Votes	%	±%	Party votes	%	±%
National	Chester Borrows	15,846	49.28	+9.70	13,417	41.13	
Labour	✗ Jill Pettis	13,444	41.81	−4.56	13,045	39.99	
Green	John Milnes	1,171	3.64		1,466	4.49	
United Future	David Ball	502	1.56		885	2.71	
Māori Party	Aaron Makutu	429	1.33		265	0.841	
Progressive	Debbie Lucas	371	1.15		448	1.37	
One NZ	Ian Brougham	214	0.67		52	0.16	
Democrats	Malcolm Murchie	175	0.54		68	0.21	
NZ First					2,185	6.70	
ACT					296	0.91	
Destiny					282	0.86	
Legalise Cannabis					68	0.21	
Christian Heritage					62	0.19	
Alliance					31	0.10	
99 MP					18	0.06	
Libertarianz					16	0.05	
Family Rights					7	0.02	
RONZ					7	0.02	
Direct Democracy					6	0.02	
Informal votes		376			144		
National gain from Labour	Majority	2,402	7.47	+14.26			

=== 1999 election ===
Refer to Candidates in the New Zealand general election 1999 by electorate#Whanganui for a list of candidates.

=== 1993 election ===
1993 general election: Wanganui
Party	Candidate	Votes	%	±%
Labour	Jill Pettis	7,399	36.62	+5.58
National	Gael Donoghue	4,028	19.93	
NZ First	Terry Heffernan	3,621	17.92	−11.36
Independent	Cam Campion	2,525	12.49	−20.55
Alliance	Fred Frederiske	2,253	11.15	
Christian Heritage	J Rush	378	1.87	
Majority		3,371	16.68	
Turnout		20,204	85.56	−1.17
Registered electors		23,612		

=== 1990 election ===
1990 general election: Wanganui
Party	Candidate	Votes	%	±%
National	Cam Campion	6,751	33.04	
Labour	Jill Pettis	6,342	31.04	
Democrats	Terry Heffernan	5,983	29.28	−5.58
Green	Terry Sarten	762	3.72	
NewLabour	Michael Blakely	446	2.18	
Social Credit	G Butler	123	0.60	
Independent	C Fackney	22	0.10	
Majority		409	2.00	
Turnout		20,429	86.73	−4.59
Registered electors		23,554		

=== 1987 election ===
1987 general election: Wanganui
Party	Candidate	Votes	%	±%
Labour	Russell Marshall	7,548	36.05	−10.67
Democrats	Terry Heffernan	7,300	34.86	+5.76
National	Allan Anderson	6,089	29.08	
Majority		248	1.18	−15.13
Turnout		20,937	91.32	−1.48
Registered electors		22,925		

=== 1984 election ===
1984 general election: Wanganui
Party	Candidate	Votes	%	±%
Labour	Russell Marshall	10,391	46.72	+6.28
Social Credit	Terry Heffernan	6,473	29.10	−3.47
National	Sue Westwood	4,579	20.58	
NZ Party	Ian David Harrex	751	3.37	
Independent	T L Sullivan	47	0.21	
Majority		3,918	17.61	+9.75
Turnout		22,241	92.80	+2.53
Registered electors		23,965		

=== 1981 election ===
1981 general election: Wanganui
Party	Candidate	Votes	%	±%
Labour	Russell Marshall	8,572	40.44	−6.33
Social Credit	Terry Heffernan	6,904	32.57	
National	Jennifer Tolhurst	5,719	26.98	
Majority		1,668	7.86	−7.09
Turnout		21,195	90.27	+15.50
Registered electors		23,477		

=== 1978 election ===
1978 general election: Wanganui
Party	Candidate	Votes	%	±%
Labour	Russell Marshall	9,703	46.77	+0.15
National	John Rowan	6,601	31.82	−8.57
Social Credit	Oliver Marks	3,956	19.07	+9.38
Values	Ross Holmes	449	2.16	
Independent	T L Sullivan	34	0.16	+0.08
Majority		3,102	14.95	+8.73
Turnout		20,743	74.77	−13.27
Registered electors		27,741		

=== 1975 election ===
1975 general election: Wanganui
Party	Candidate	Votes	%	±%
Labour	Russell Marshall	9,313	46.62	−7.75
National	John Rowan	8,069	40.39	
Social Credit	Oliver Marks	1,937	9.69	
Values	Roger Angus	541	2.70	
Christian Democratic	Tom Fouhy	100	0.50	
Independent	T L Sullivan	16	0.08	−0.19
Majority		1,244	6.22	−9.45
Turnout		19,976	88.04	−4.04
Registered electors		22,689		

=== 1972 election ===
1972 general election: Wanganui
Party	Candidate	Votes	%	±%
Labour	Russell Marshall	9,987	54.37	
National	Bill Tolhurst	7,108	38.70	−9.34
Social Credit	J S Humphreys	1,168	6.35	−2.73
New Democratic	R A Dowdie	53	0.28	
Independent	T L Sullivan	50	0.27	+0.09
Majority		2,879	15.67	
Turnout		18,366	92.08	+0.72
Registered electors		19,944		

=== 1969 election ===
1969 general election: Wanganui
Party	Candidate	Votes	%	±%
National	Bill Tolhurst	8,233	48.04	
Labour	George Spooner	7,274	42.44	+0.59
Social Credit	J S Humphreys	1,557	9.08	
Independent	D M Lewis	40	0.23	
Independent	T L Sullivan	32	0.18	
Majority		959	5.59	
Turnout		17,136	91.36	+1.34
Registered electors		18,755		

=== 1966 election ===
1966 general election: Wanganui
Party	Candidate	Votes	%	±%
Labour	George Spooner	6,499	41.85	−4.42
National	John Grace	5,591	36.01	−1.56
Social Credit	Percival John Dempsey	3,206	20.64	+4.50
Christian Democratic	D G Tumery	233	1.50	
Majority		908	5.84	−2.86
Turnout		15,529	90.02	−3.01
Registered electors		17,249		

=== 1963 election ===
1963 general election: Wanganui
Party	Candidate	Votes	%	±%
Labour	George Spooner	7,430	46.27	+6.11
National	John Grace	6,033	37.57	
Social Credit	Percival John Dempsey	2,593	16.14	
Majority		1,397	8.70	+7.65
Turnout		16,056	93.03	+0.51
Registered electors		17,258		

=== 1960 election ===
1960 general election: Wanganui
Party	Candidate	Votes	%	±%
Labour	George Spooner	6,071	40.16	
National	Eugene Crotty	5,911	39.10	
Social Credit	Roly Marks	3,132	20.72	−1.71
Majority		160	1.05	
Turnout		15,114	92.52	−2.12
Registered electors		16,335		

=== 1957 election ===
1957 general election: Wanganui
Party	Candidate	Votes	%	±%
Labour	Joe Cotterill	6,550	43.49	+5.05
National	Alice Kathleen Maclean	5,131	34.07	
Social Credit	Roly Marks	3,378	22.43	−2.96
Majority		1,419	9.42	+7.13
Turnout		15,059	94.64	+3.29
Registered electors		15,911		

=== 1954 election ===
1954 general election: Wanganui
Party	Candidate	Votes	%	±%
Labour	Joe Cotterill	5,115	38.44	−12.41
National	Jack Rumbold	4,810	36.15	
Social Credit	Roly Marks	3,378	25.39	
Majority		305	2.29	+0.59
Turnout		13,303	91.35	+2.43
Registered electors		14,562		

=== 1951 election ===
1951 general election: Wanganui
Party	Candidate	Votes	%	±%
Labour	Joe Cotterill	6,779	50.85	−2.89
National	Ernest Victor O'Keefe	6,553	49.15	+2.89
Majority		226	1.70	−5.76
Turnout		13,332	88.92	−2.93
Registered electors		14,993		

=== 1949 election ===
1949 general election: Wanganui
Party	Candidate	Votes	%	±%
Labour	Joe Cotterill	7,336	53.74	−3.31
National	Ernest Victor O'Keefe	6,317	46.26	
Majority		1,019	7.46	−6.62
Turnout		13,653	91.85	−0.84
Registered electors		14,863		

=== 1946 election ===
1946 general election: Wanganui
Party	Candidate	Votes	%	±%
Labour	Joe Cotterill	7,833	57.05	+8.00
National	Eric Merewether	5,899	42.95	
Majority		1,934	14.08	+3.78
Turnout		13,732	92.69	−4.00
Registered electors		14,814		

=== 1943 election ===
1943 general election: Wanganui
Party	Candidate	Votes	%	±%
Labour	Joe Cotterill	6,691	49.05	−15.34
National	Eric James Kirk	4,254	31.18	
Real Democracy	Roly Marks	1,722	12.62	
Democratic Labour	Sydney Duffy	832	6.09	
Informal votes		142	1.04	+0.58
Majority		2,437	17.86	+11.38
Turnout		13,641	96.69	+1.95
Registered electors		14,107		

=== 1938 election ===
1938 general election: Wanganui
Party	Candidate	Votes	%	±%
Labour	Joe Cotterill	8,630	64.39	+18.09
National	Henry Charles Veitch	4,710	35.14	+3.70
Informal votes		62	0.46	−0.20
Majority		3,920	29.24	+14.38
Turnout		13,402	94.74	
Registered electors		14,145		

=== 1935 election ===
1935 general election: Wanganui
Party	Candidate	Votes	%	±%
Labour	Joe Cotterill	4,887	46.66	
Democrat	Bill Veitch	3,318	31.68	−21.39
Reform	Norman Rhind Bain	1,754	16.74	
Independent Liberal	James Thomas Hogan	524	5.00	
Informal votes		61	0.58	+0.06
Majority		1,569	14.98	
Turnout		10,473	91.59	+8.41
Registered electors		11,434		

=== 1931 election ===
1931 general election: Wanganui
Party	Candidate	Votes	%	±%
United	Bill Veitch	5,096	53.07	+5.52
Labour	Bill Rogers	4,506	46.93	+19.79
Majority		590	6.14	−14.26
Informal votes		50	0.52	−0.05
Turnout		9,652	83.18	−4.55
Registered electors		11,604		

=== 1928 election ===
1928 general election: Wanganui
Party	Candidate	Votes	%	±%
United	Bill Veitch	4,979	47.55	+4.28
Labour	Bill Rogers	2,842	27.14	+4.80
Reform	N. G. Lewis	2,650	25.31	
Majority		2,137	20.41	+11.52
Informal votes		60	0.57	−0.11
Turnout		10,531	87.73	−4.09
Registered electors		12,004		

=== 1925 election ===
1925 general election: Wanganui
Party	Candidate	Votes	%	±%
Liberal	Bill Veitch	4,339	43.27	−8.12
Reform	John Coull	3,448	34.39	
Labour	Bill Rogers	2,240	22.34	
Majority		891	8.89	−2.96
Informal votes		69	0.68	−0.06
Turnout		10,096	91.82	+0.83
Registered electors		10,996		

=== 1922 election ===
1922 general election: Wanganui
Party	Candidate	Votes	%	±%
Liberal	Bill Veitch	4,648	51.39	−0.77
Reform	John Coull	3,576	39.54	
Labour	James Ross	752	8.31	
Informal votes		67	0.74	−0.18
Majority		1,072	11.85	−8.61
Turnout		9,043	90.99	+11.88
Registered electors		9,938		

=== 1919 election ===
1919 general election: Wanganui
Party	Candidate	Votes	%	±%
Independent Labour	Bill Veitch	4,340	52.16	+9.98
Reform	William J. Cuttle	2,637	31.69	
Labour	Lew McIlvride	1,266	15.21	
Informal votes		77	0.92	−0.03
Majority		1,703	20.46	+9.67
Turnout		8,320	79.21	−5.27
Registered electors		10,503		

=== 1914 election ===
1914 general election: Wanganui
Party	Candidate	Votes	%	±%
United Labour	Bill Veitch	3,330	42.18	−15.81
Independent	Frederick Pirani	2,478	31.39	
Liberal–Labour	James Thomas Hogan	2,086	26.42	−15.27
Informal votes		75	0.95	+0.64
Majority		852	10.79	−5.50
Turnout		7,894	84.48	+4.49
Registered electors		9,344		

=== 1911 election ===
1911 general election: Wanganui, first ballot
Party	Candidate	Votes	%	±%
Independent Labour	Bill Veitch	2,295	31.01	
Liberal–Labour	James Thomas Hogan	2,220	30.00	−15.85
Reform	George Hutchison	1,690	22.84	−5.53
Independent	Charles Mackay	1,117	15.09	−10.69
Informal votes		51	0.68	
Turnout		7,399	83.40	+5.34
Second ballot result
Independent Labour	Bill Veitch	4,115	57.99	+26.98
Liberal–Labour	James Thomas Hogan	2,959	41.69	+11.69
Informal votes		22	0.31	−0.37
Majority		1,156	16.29	
Turnout		7,096	79.99	−3.41
Registered electors		8,871		

=== 1908 election ===
1908 general election: Wanganui, first ballot
Party	Candidate	Votes	%	±%
Liberal–Labour	James Thomas Hogan	3,041	45.85	
Conservative	George Hutchison	1,882	28.37	
Independent	Charles Mackay	1,710	25.78	
Majority		1,159	17.47	
Turnout		6,633	78.06	
Registered electors		8,497		
Second ballot result
Liberal–Labour	James Thomas Hogan	3,602	54.30	+8.46
Conservative	George Hutchison	2,860	43.12	14.74
Majority		742	11.19	−6.29
Turnout		6,462	76.05	−2.01
Registered electors		8,497		

=== 1899 election ===
1899 general election: Wanganui
Party	Candidate	Votes	%	±%
Liberal	Archibald Willis	2,878	55.83	
Conservative	Gilbert Carson	2,169	42.08	
Independent Liberal	John Michael Murphy	108	2.10	
Majority		709	13.75	
Turnout		5,155	80.53	
Registered electors		6,401		

=== 1893 by-election ===
1893 Wanganui by-election
Party	Candidate	Votes	%	±%
Liberal	Archibald Willis	1,031	62.37	
Conservative	Gilbert Carson	622	37.62	
Majority		409	24.74	
Turnout		1,653		

=== 1890 election ===
1890 general election: Wanganui
Party	Candidate	Votes	%	±%
Liberal	John Ballance	808	50.85	−15.95
Conservative	Gilbert Carson	781	49.15	+15.95
Majority		27	1.69	−31.9
Turnout		1,589	75.20	−4.19
Registered electors		2,113		

=== 1887 election ===
1887 general election: Wanganui
Party	Candidate	Votes	%	±%
Independent	John Ballance	865	66.80	
Independent	Gilbert Carson	430	33.20	
Majority		435	33.59	
Turnout		1,295	79.39	
Registered electors		1,631		

=== 1884 election ===
1884 general election: Wanganui
Party	Candidate	Votes	%	±%
Independent	John Ballance	541	60.11	+10.36
Independent	George Hutchison	205	22.77	
Independent	William Hogg Watt	154	17.11	−33.14
Majority		336	37.33	2.69
Turnout		900	66.86	
Registered electors		1,346		

=== 1881 election ===
1881 general election: Wanganui
Party	Candidate	Votes	%	±%
Independent	William Hogg Watt	397	50.25	
Independent	John Ballance	393	49.75	−18.28
Majority		4	0.50	
Turnout		790	64.17	+4.44
Registered electors		1,231		

=== 1879 election ===
1879 general election: Wanganui
Party	Candidate	Votes	%	±%
Independent	John Bryce	560	69.65	
Independent	John Ballance	547	68.03	
Independent	Sir William Fox	501	62.31	
Majority		46	5.72	
Turnout		804	59.73	
Registered electors		1,346		

=== 1876 by-election ===
1876 Wanganui by-election
Party	Candidate	Votes	%	±%
Independent	William Fox	256	60.81	
Independent	John Morgan	165	39.19	
Turnout		421		
Majority		91	21.62	

=== 1867 by-election ===
1867 Wanganui by-election
Party	Candidate	Votes	%	±%
Independent	Henry Shafto Harrison	143	57.66	
Independent	William Hutchison	105	42.34	
Turnout		248		
Majority		38	15.32	

== Bibliography ==
- Mansfield, F. W. (1909). The General Election, 1908. National Library.
- McRobie, Alan (1989). Electoral Atlas of New Zealand. Wellington: GP Books. ISBN 0-477-01384-8.
- Norton, Clifford (1988). New Zealand Parliamentary Election Results 1946–1987: Occasional Publications No 1, Department of Political Science. Wellington: Victoria University of Wellington. ISBN 0-475-11200-8.
- Scholefield, Guy (1925) [First ed. published 1913]. New Zealand Parliamentary Record (2nd ed.). Wellington: Govt. Printer.
- Wilson, Jim (1985) [First ed. published 1913]. New Zealand Parliamentary Record, 1840–1984 (4th ed.). Wellington: V.R. Ward, Govt. Printer. OCLC 154283103.
