= Whanganui Chronicle =

New Zealand newspaper

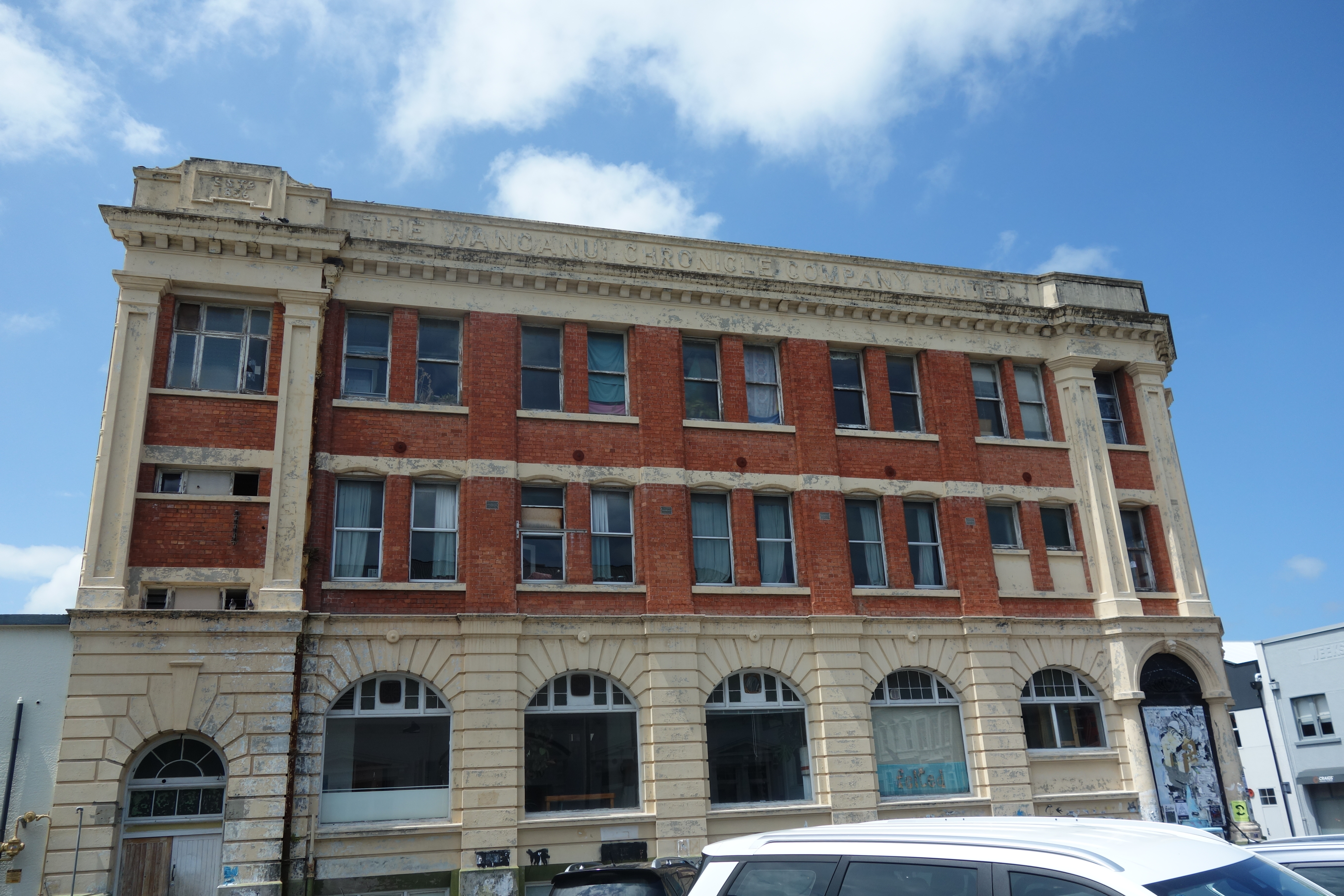
- Wanganui Chronicle building in Rutland Street
- Type: Daily Newspaper
- Format: Broadsheet on Saturdays, Compact Mon–Fri
- Owner: New Zealand Media and Entertainment Ltd
- Editor: Zaryd Wilson
- Founded: 1856
- Headquarters: Whanganui, New Zealand
- Circulation: 23,000 (2020)
- Website: www.nzherald.co.nz/whanganui-chronicle/

The Whanganui Chronicle is New Zealand's oldest newspaper. Based in Whanganui, it celebrated 160 years of publishing in September 2016. It is the main daily paper for the Whanganui, Ruapehu and Rangitīkei regions, including the towns of Pātea, Waverley, Whanganui, Bulls, Marton, Raetihi, Ohakune and National Park.

== History ==
Local resident Henry Stokes first proposed the paper for Petre, as the town was then called, but initial publication was held back by lack of equipment. As no printing press was available, Stokes approached the technical master at Wanganui Collegiate School, Rev. Charles Nicholls, and together they constructed a maire wood and iron makeshift printing press, on which, with the help of the staff and pupils of the school, the first edition of the Wanganui Chronicle (as it was then spelled) was printed on 18 September 1856.

The motto of the paper, printed at the top of the editorial column, was "Verite Sans Peur," French for "Truth without Fear."

Initially the paper was sold fortnightly, at a price of six pence. In 1866 the Chronicle went tri-weekly, and in 1871 began publishing daily and has done so since. The paper was owned and edited by Gilbert Carson from 1875 onwards. In the 1880s Carson's sister Margaret Bullock worked as a reporter and assistant editor for the paper, and, along with Laura Jane Suisted, was one of the first female parliamentary correspondents in New Zealand. The woman editor for a time in the 1920s using her birth name Iris Wilkinson, later published poetry and novels as Robin Hyde, and is now "acknowledged as a major figure in New Zealand twentieth-century culture".

The Chronicle's rival from 1867 onward was The Evening Herald (later The Wanganui Herald), founded by John Ballance. The ownership of the two daily papers merged in the 1970s, and in 1986 the Herald became a free weekly, later renamed the Wanganui Midweek. The Chronicle is currently Whanganui's only daily newspaper.

== Recent history ==
The paper was acquired by the new company NZME in September 2014, after the merger of APN News and Media and The Radio Network. It is one of NZME's 32 publications, including The New Zealand Herald, Bay of Plenty Times, The Northern Advocate and Hawkes Bay Today. It is based in the NZME offices on Guyton Street, alongside other NZME operations such as Newstalk ZB, The Hits and OneRoof.

On Monday, 10 September 2018, the paper changed its name to the Whanganui Chronicle, to correspond with the corrected Māori spelling of the Whanganui district that became official in December 2015.

In September 2020, the paper reached an average issue readership of 23,000 people aged 15 and above. This was 8000 more readers during the same survey period in 2019, and up 3000 readers on the previous survey ending March 2020. The Chronicle has some of the highest readership per capita of any publication in New Zealand.
