= Hatrick =

Hatrick may refer to:

- Alexander Hatrick (1857 – 1918), a New Zealand merchant, shipowner, tourism entrepreneur and mayor
- Gloria Hatrick Stewart, an American actress and model
- Hat-trick, the achievement of a positive feat three times in a game
- Hatrick Hodi Maga, (English: Hit a hat-trick son), a 2009 Indian Kannada action-crime film
- Hat Trick Productions, independent British TV production company
