= Royal Whanganui Opera House =

Theatre in Whanganui, New Zealand

Coordinates: 39°56′04″S 175°03′06″E

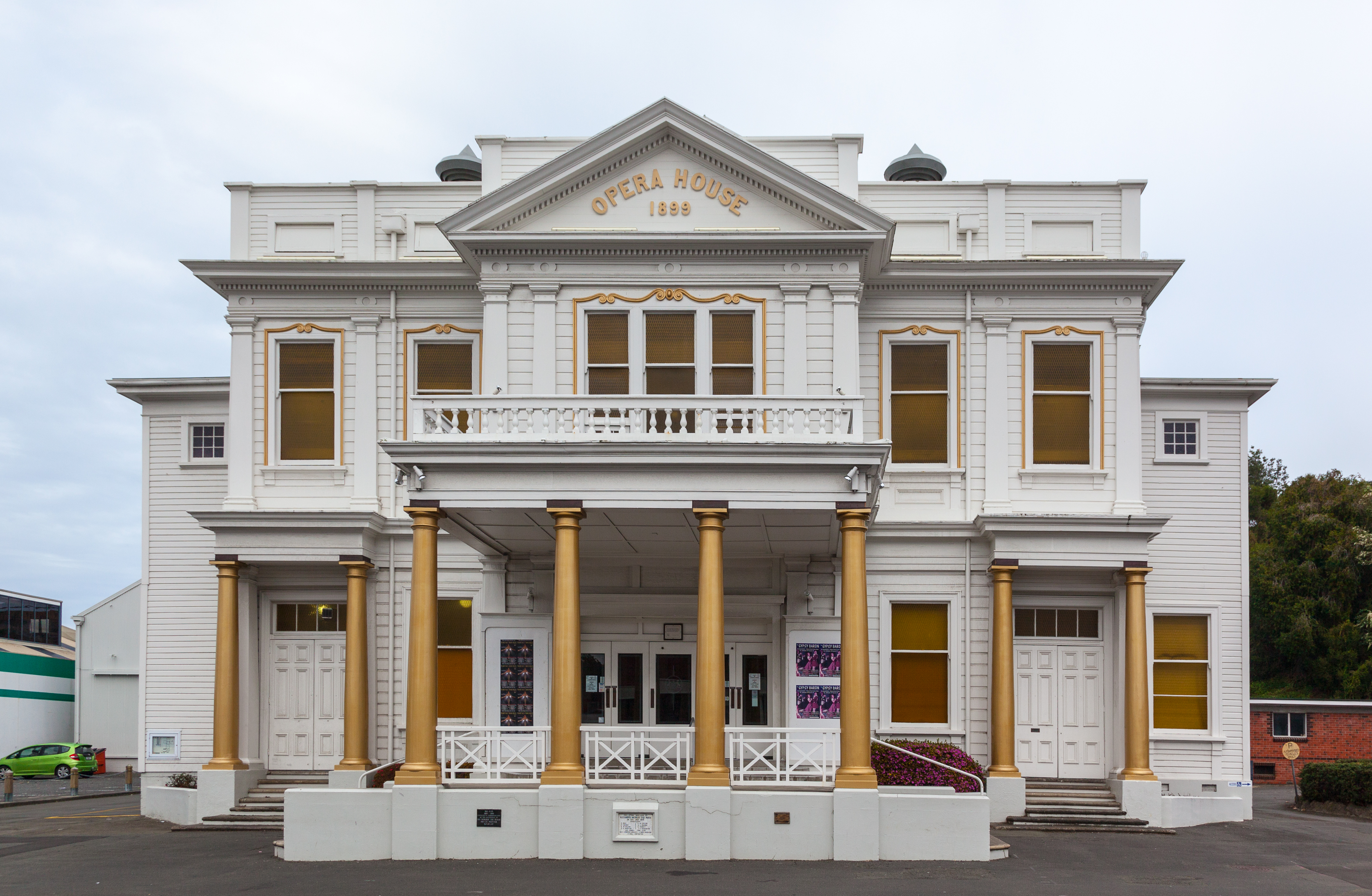
Royal Whanganui Opera House in New Zealand

The Royal Whanganui Opera House is a theatre located in Whanganui, New Zealand. Built in 1899, it is New Zealand's last Victorian theatre. Located on St Hill Street in central Whanganui, the theatre seats 830 and is a venue for many local, national and international events.

These include grand opera, operetta, tribute concerts, piano recitals, orchestral concerts, school events, lectures, graduation ceremonies, fashion shows, dance of all forms, and floral theatre. Functions requiring a stage and auditorium style seating can be accommodated. Wedding ceremonies have been performed and the stage can accommodate a reception of up to 80. The Opera House has its own ticketing system but maintains a link to TicketDirect Network.

== Background ==
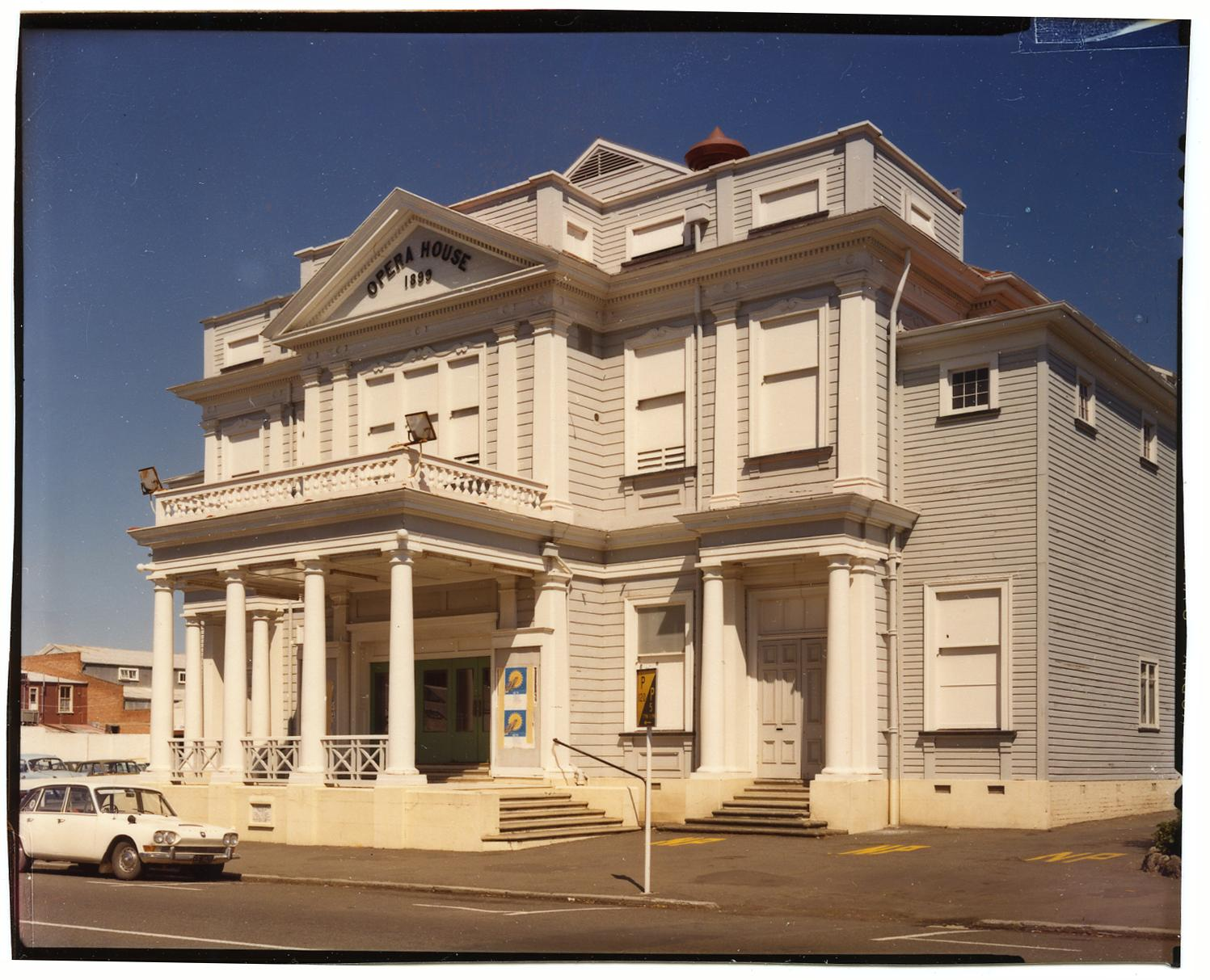
The Opera House in 1967, before the paint job.

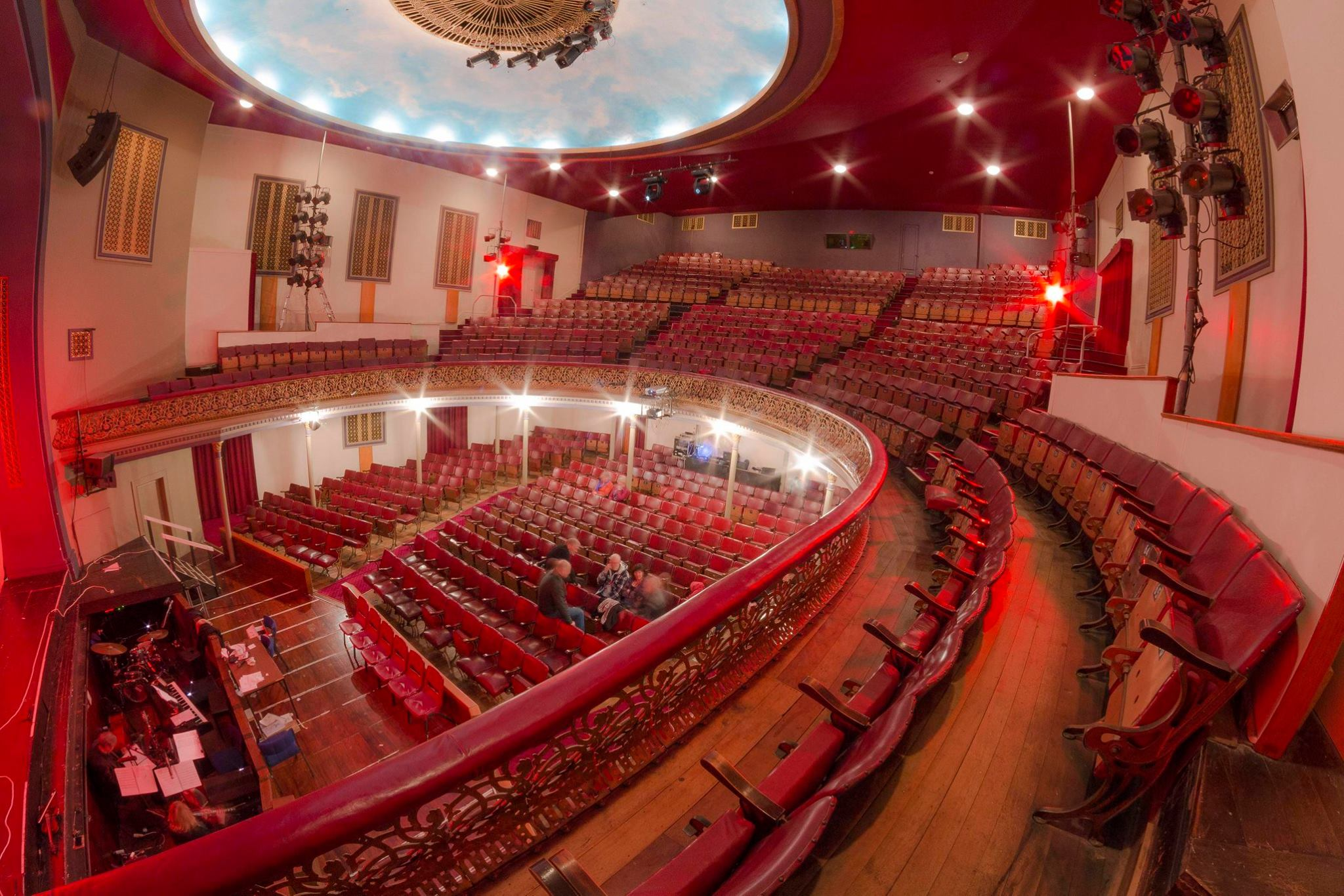
The interior of the Opera House in 2014

In 1897, Wanganui Borough Councillor F.M. Spurdle proposed that Queen Victoria's “record reign” should be commemorated by the building of an opera house. The idea was supported by Mayor Alexander Hatrick, an investigative committee was established and the council agreed to proceed. The Wanganui Opera House Company published a prospectus in a local newspaper in March 1897. Of the 5000 £1 shares, 4000 were offered to the public. The council announced a competition to design the opera house, to be sited beside the council chambers in St Hill St. The successful architect was to be rewarded with supervision of the job, and a commission of five percent on the total cost, with a second prize of £40 and third prize of £20. The winner, Wellington architect, George Stevenson, was announced in January, 1899. Stevenson died that July, the day on which the foundation stone was laid. A retired Whanganui builder, James Tawse, took over supervision free of charge. The tender of £4597 was awarded to a former employee of his, Swiss-born Nicholas Meuli, who ran his own building company in Whanganui.

== Building ==
The general design of the building is of the Tuscan order (pillars and pilasters) for the lower storey and the Doric for the upper one, and somewhat in keeping with the Borough's other building alongside, the Council Chambers.

The plans Stevenson drew up are held in the Whanganui Regional Museum. Copies are displayed in the bar/sweet stall lounge at the Opera House. The six sheets show "plans at basement, ground floor and dress circle levels, a longitudinal cross-section, and external elevations.

The Wanganui Herald of the day recorded that "the building which is of wood, resting on massive concrete foundations, all the inside walls being plastered. In size, it compares favorably with any theatre in the colony, the auditorium measuring 60 ft by 60 ft, affording seating accommodation for over one thousand persons. The dress circle and orchestral stall seats are of the latest pattern, with cast-iron frames and upholstered backs, the latter to tip up, thus giving ample room for persons to pass in front of those sitting down…" The circle itself was supported from below by 18 cast iron pillars, painted to imitate marble, and which spoiled the view of patrons. Even today patrons avoid buying seats located too close to the pillars. Behind the circle was a reception and refreshment room”.

Thomson notes that "the auditorium was comparatively narrow, and the circle ended at the proscenium on each side, "strengthening the intimacy of relationship between actors and audience". Ten large windows provided some ventilation and lit the auditorium and dress circle in the day time. Other ventilation was provided with "twenty-two ‘a hit and miss’ ventilator fitted into the walls, and in the dome itself is an ornamental cast-iron ventilator. At night electricity was used to light the theatre, ‘power for which is derived from a 16 hp Crossley Brothers engine".

== Timeline ==
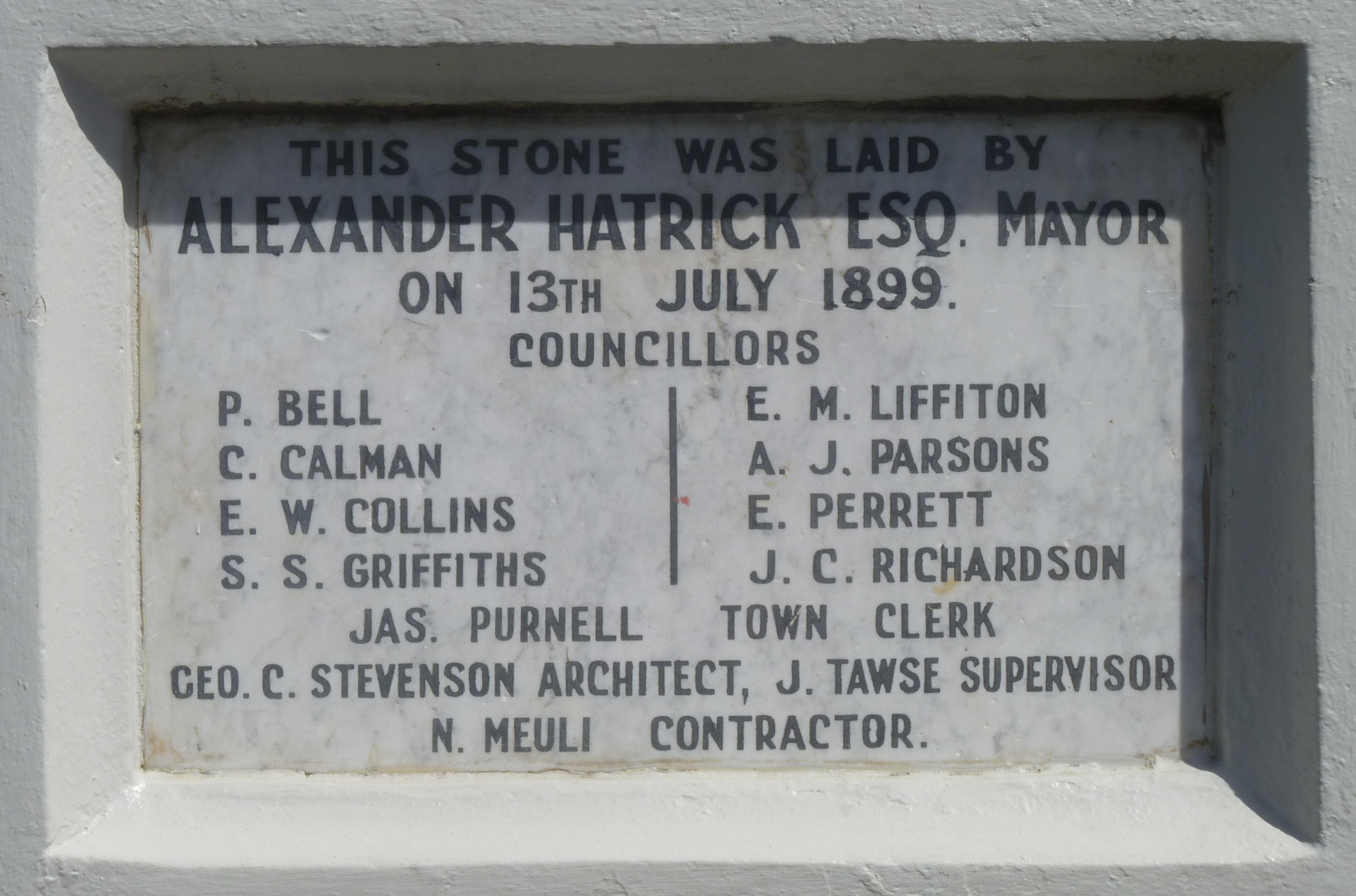
Foundation stone laid in 1899

- 1897 – Council discusses need for Municipal Opera House.
- 1898 – Competition to design an Opera House for Wanganui.
- 1899 – Foundation stone laid by Mayor Alexander Hatrick
- 1900 – Official opening by Premier Richard Seddon on 9 February
- 1900 – First shows, A Sporting Life and The White Heather performed 9 January by Bland Holt and Company.
- 1901 – Water main laid.
- 1905 – Wanganui Liedertafel - 20th Grand Concert.
- 1909 – Handrails provided on stairs leading to Dress Circle.
- 1910 – Agreement in July to cover stage entrance before next winter.
- 1911 – Engineer told to prepare specifications and tenders invited for erecting stage.
- 1912 – Larger music stands and improved lamp holders for the orchestra.
- 1913 – The committee decided to recover 300 armrests, in Utrecht velvet.
- 1915 – Staircase to dress circle treated with dark spirit stain.
- 1917 – Engineer reports on ventilation.
- 1918 – Council suggests Opera House could become Fire Station.
- 1920 – Alterations to Opera House - movie theatre established.
- 1921 – Modification of seats with central aisle created.
- 1930 – Wiring reconditioned.
- 1934 – First loan paid off.
- 1937 – Fire in sweet stall closes theatre for several months.
- 1938 – Annexe added.
- 1956 – Custodian/manager collapses, dies.
- 1957 – Opera House Debt free.
- 1958 – Gas engine removed.
- 1962 – Stairs carpeted.
- 1963 – Exterior repainting.
- 1967 – Gray's attention drawn to deterioration in paintwork.
- 1964 – Dome repainted.
- 1978 – Fire in annexe.
- 1986 – Staff member Dave Brough died while working in the circle.
- 1989 – Council retains control of Opera House for at least 12 months more. Friends of the Opera House steering committee established. Membership drive for Friends of the Opera House begins. Smoke detectors installed. Foodtown donates $10,000 for refurbishing the orchestra pit. Girvan Corporation pledges at least $* 5000 – through pre-Christmas competition.
- 1990 – Orchestra pit refurbished.
- 1991 – $51,000 Lotteries Commission grant towards sprinkler system.
- 1991 – Exit doors installed at either side of the building replace two doors at the front of the building and make room for upgraded toilet facilities.
- 1992 – New toilet facilities provided, including a paraplegic toilet. Upstairs area becomes lounge, bar and new sweet stall.
- 1992 – New toilet facilities completed. Seat refurbishment begins.
- 1993 – Stage replaced. Seventeen volunteers help to lay * 3500 – lineal metres of matai timber, and hammer in 15,500 nails. Old flooring reused in the foyer of the Whanganui Riverboat Restoration and Navigation Trust's Riverboat centre in Taupo Quay.
- 1995 – Newly installed sprinklers save Opera House from arson attempt.
- 1996 – Historic Places Trust awards Category One grading to the Opera House.
- 1997 – Discussions to extend annexe. Historic Places Trust agrees to 15 m by 13 m corrugated iron extension to maintain historic connections. Plans include room for set construction and catering kitchen.
- 1999 – Annexe construction begins. Centennial celebrations begin. October: Royal charter given to the Opera House as part of the centennial celebrations. Name changed to Royal Wanganui Opera House
- 2015 – Whanganui District Council has determined that the building is earthquake prone under the Building Act 2004.
