= PS Manuwai =

New Zealand paddle-steamer

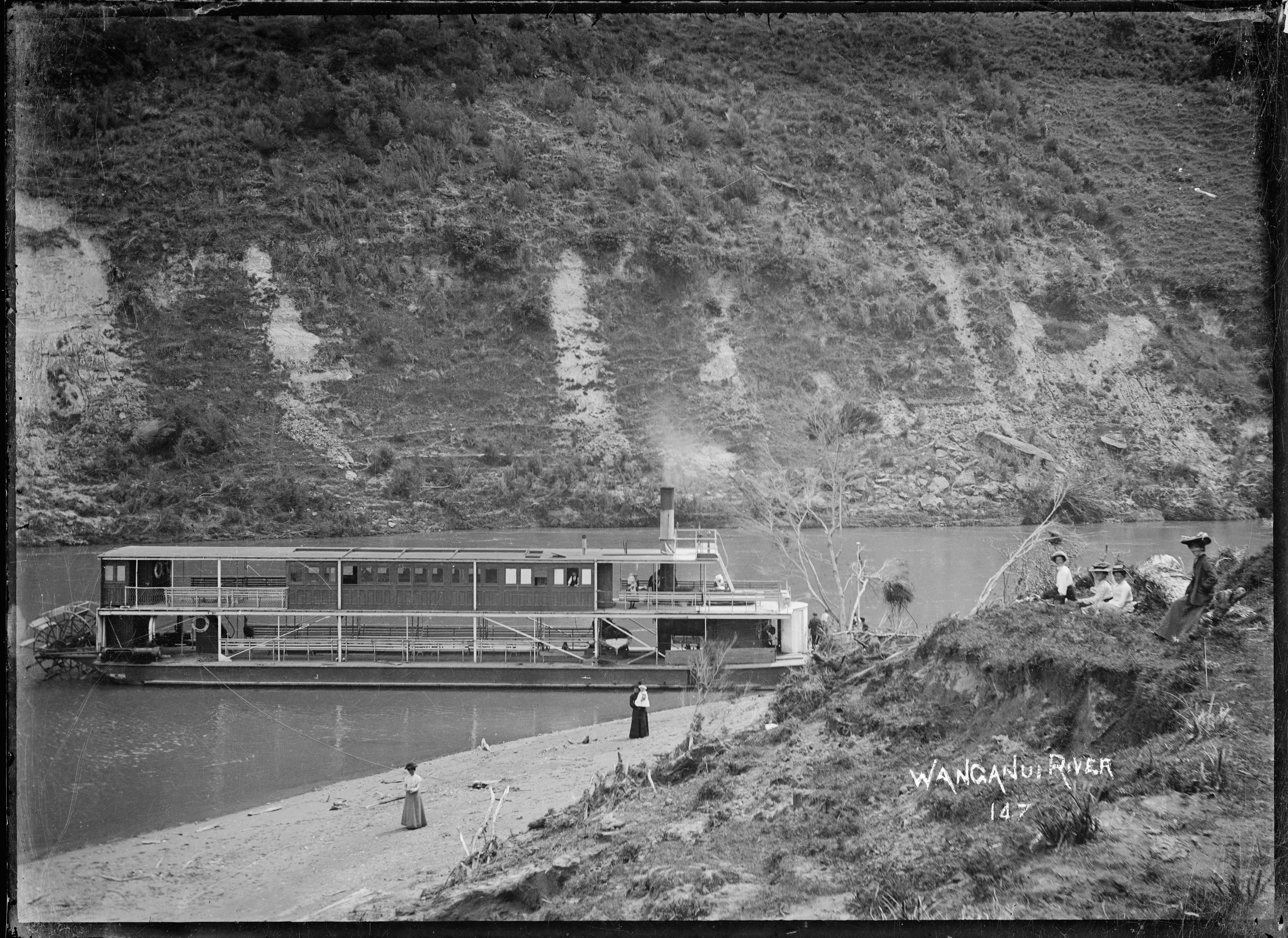
- Manuwai on the Whanganui River about 1905

History

New Zealand
- Name: Manuwai
- Owner: 1894–1920: Alexander Hatrick & Co.; 1920–1939: Caesar Roose
- Builder: Yarrow, Poplar
- Launched: 17 September 1894
- Out of service: 1939
- Fate: converted to a barge

General characteristics
- Length: 121 ft (37 m)
- Beam: 18 ft (5.5 m)
- Draught: 1 ft (0.30 m)
- Decks: 2
- Propulsion: steam 10½" x 2' 6" cylinders at 160 psi (1,100 kPa)
- Speed: 11.5 mph (18.5 km/h)
- Capacity: 400 passengers

Manuwai (translates from Māori as water bird) was a New Zealand stern wheel paddle-steamer, built for use on the Whanganui River and moved to the Waikato in 1920.

Manuwai was ordered in January 1894, at the end of July Kaikoura delivered her, together with her furniture, crockery, upholstery and cutlery, to Wellington, then Cunningham & Woods and William Coates, both of Wellington, assembled her opposite Whanganui gas works and she was launched on 17 September 1894 for Alexandra Hatrick & Co. She had a spoon bow and sloping stern, built of Siemen's steel, with 7 watertight compartments, steam engines with 10½" x 2' 6" cylinders and a 160 psi (1,100 kPa) boiler, added after her launch. The dining saloon had tables for 30. The lower deck was used for stock and up to 200 wool bales.

From about 1905, as the fleet increased, Manuwai was mainly used below the first rapids at Hipango Park. In 1907 her lower deck had an extra intermediate deck added, so that she could carry over 1,000 sheep. After Pipiriki House burnt down in 1909, she was converted to a 50-berth houseboat. She returned to excursion work in 1910 and continued trips to the Park until April 1920.

Caesar Roose bought the steamer in 1920. Her top deck and machinery were removed and, in June 1920, she was towed from the Whanganui to Port Waikato by ss Arapawa, arriving on 4 June. Electric lighting was installed, a dining table to seat 100 was added to the lower deck, and, after a day's cancellation due to engine problems, she started running excursions from Hamilton in December 1920. In 1924 a Cambridge to Port Waikato excursion was being run 2 or 3 times a year, taking 12 to 14 hours downstream and a few hours longer upstream; for example steamers in 1939 took about 90 minutes from Ngāruawāhia to Hamilton. Manuwai sank at her moorings in 1938, but was taken to Mercer for repair in 1939, where she was converted to a barge. Several of the old steamers remained beside the river, including the Manuwai.

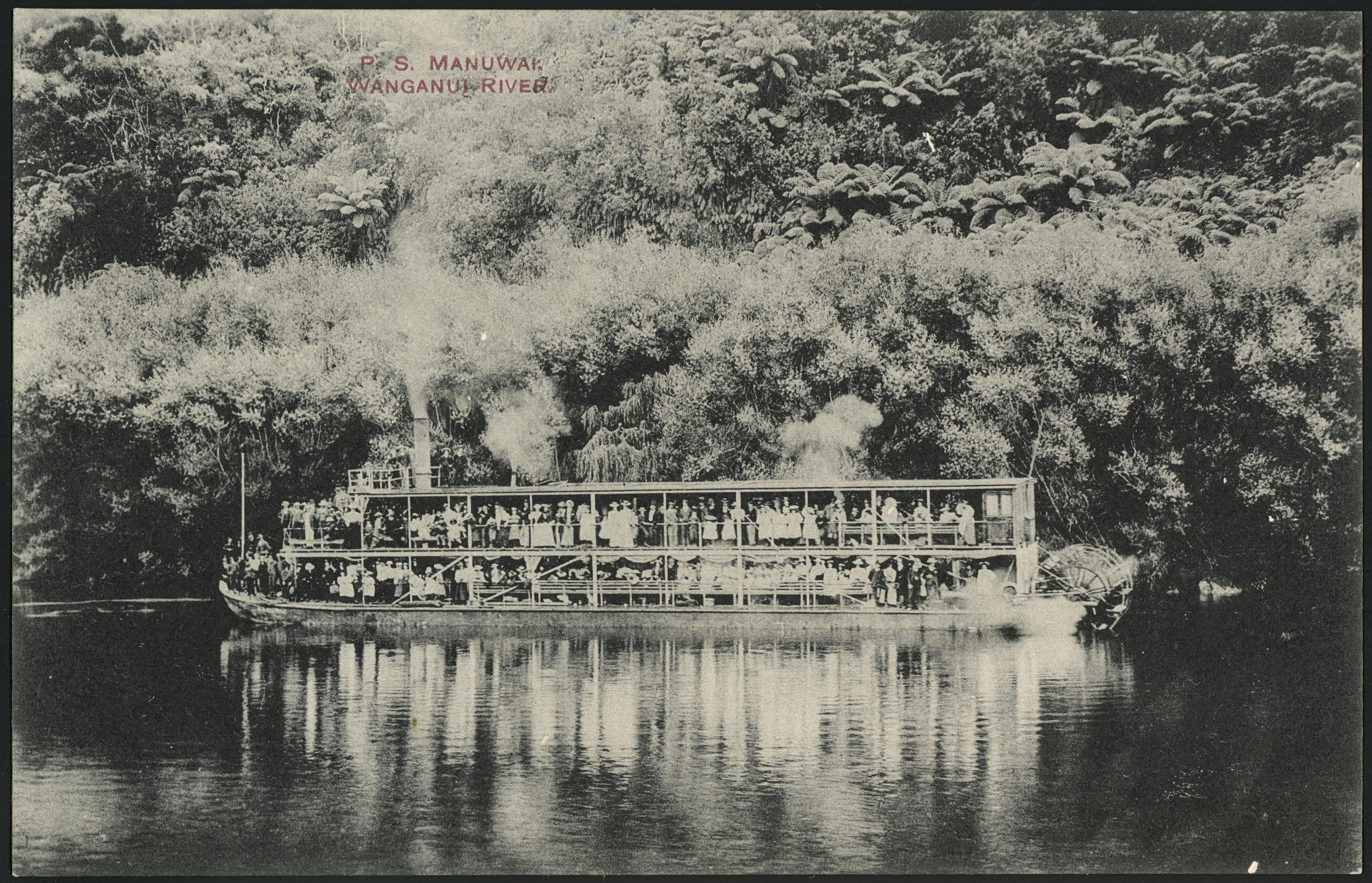
Manuwai on the Whanganui River

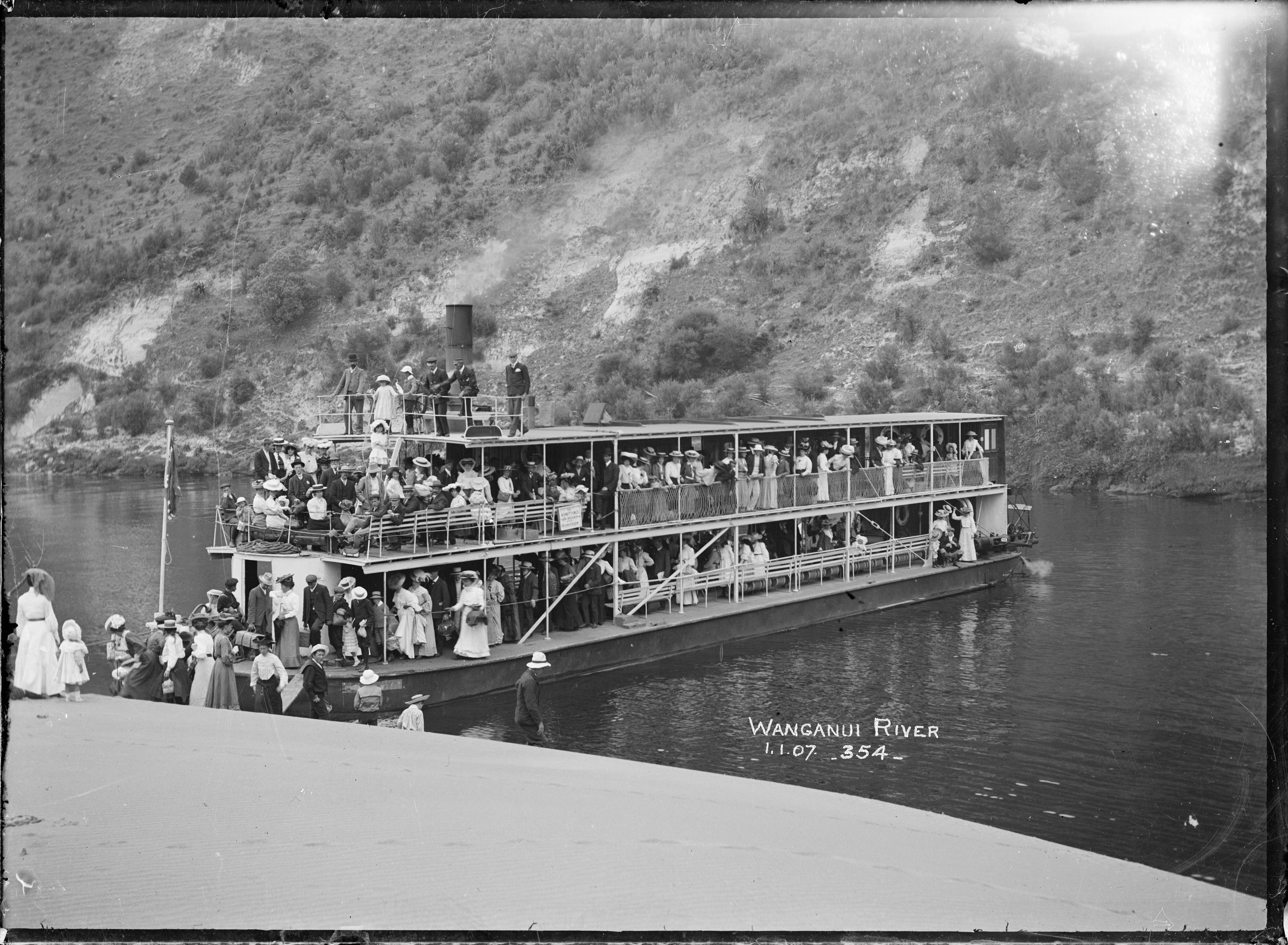
Manuwai on the Whanganui River 1907

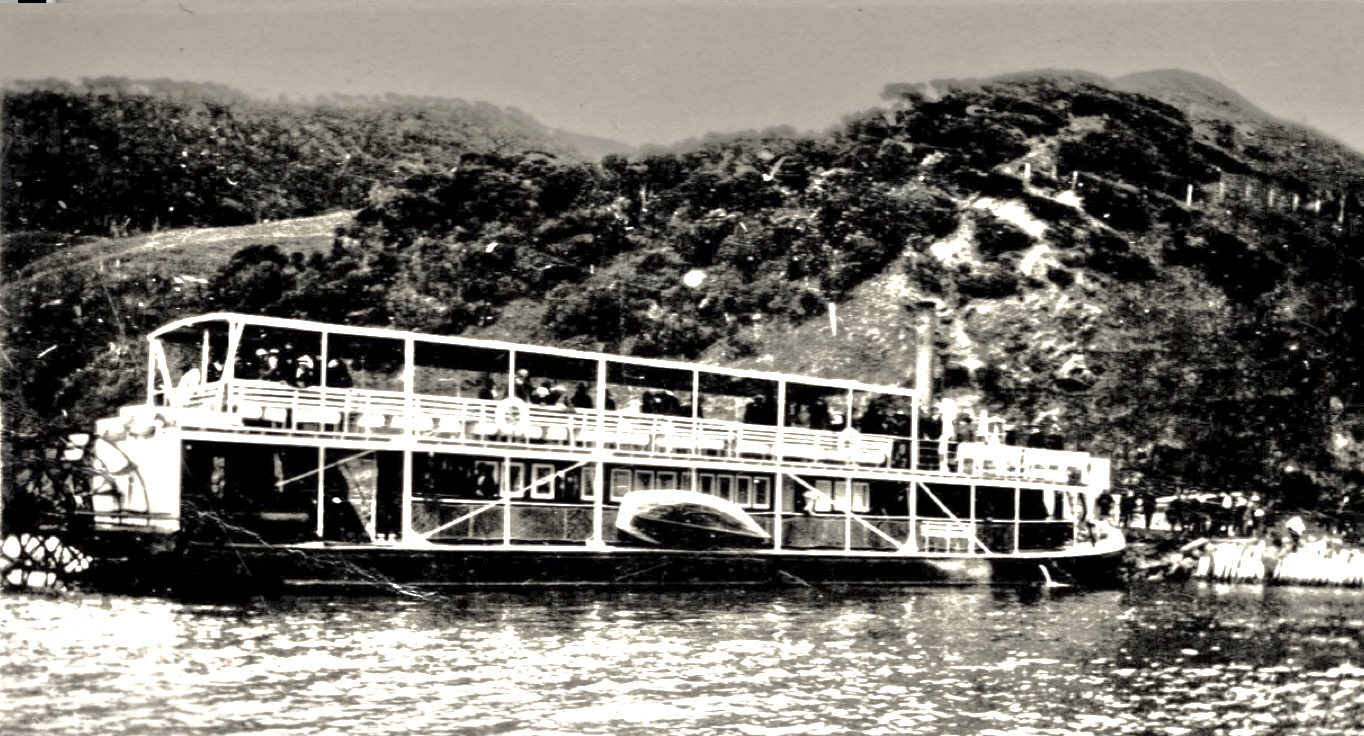
Manuwai at Port Waikato in 1920s

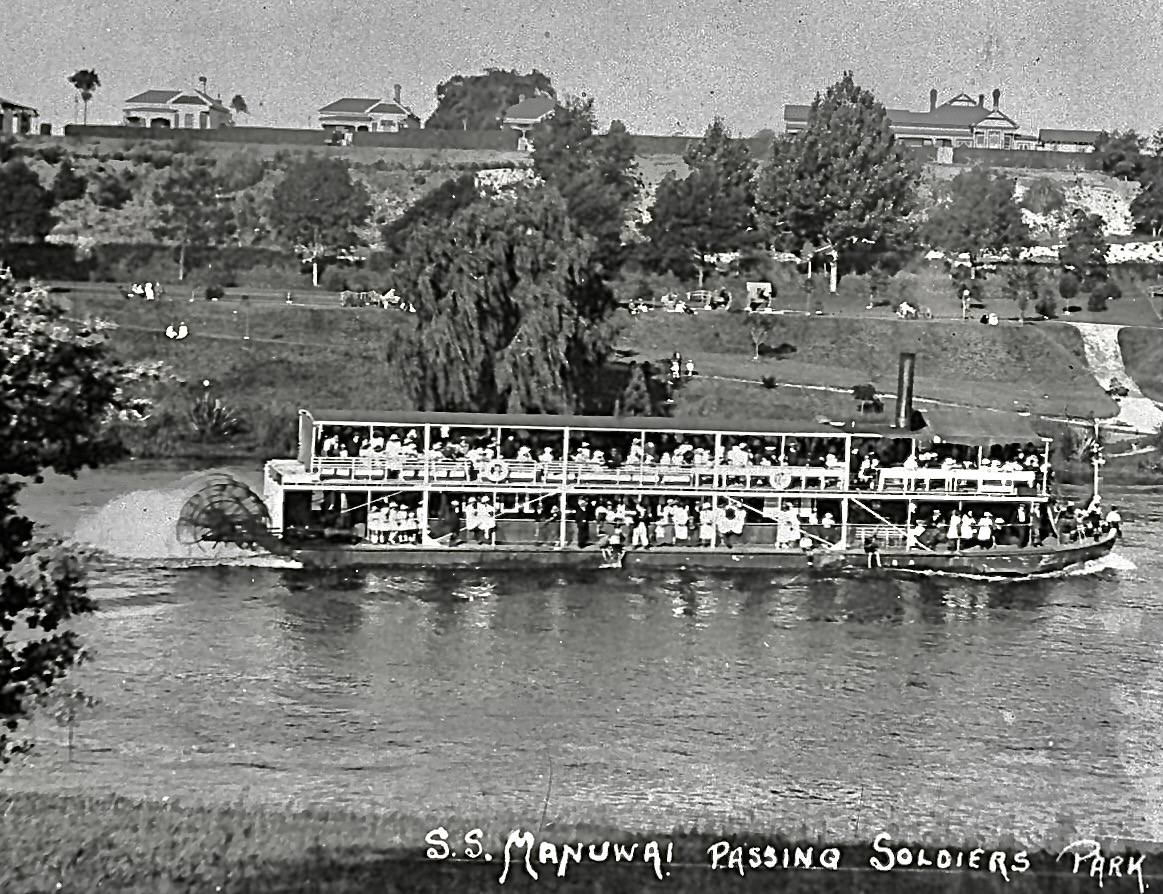
Manuwai in Hamilton 1923

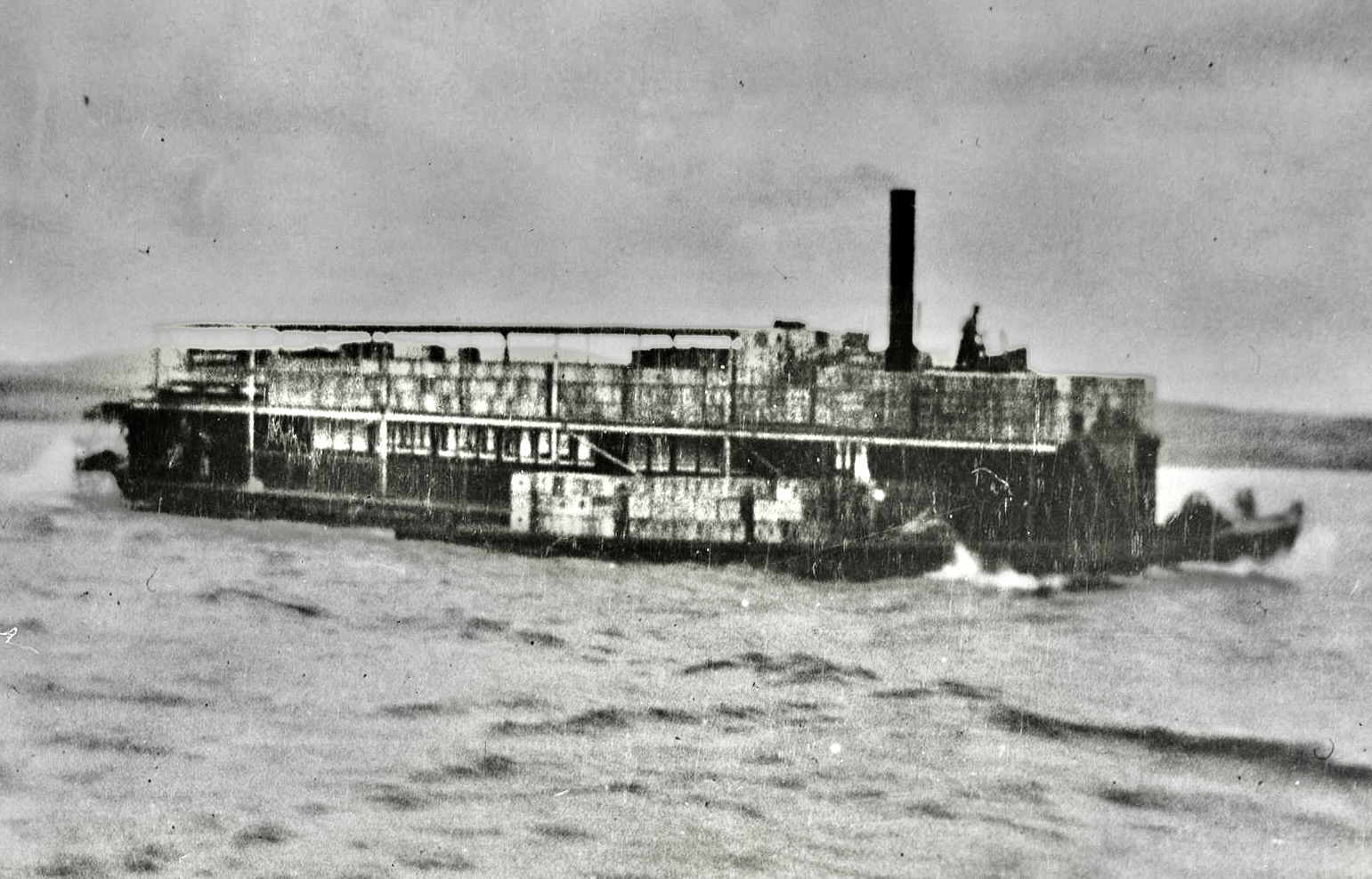
Manuwai with benzine cases, about 1927

== See also ==
- Pioneer
- Rangiriri
- Waimarie
