= Caesar Roose =

Shipping fleet owner (1886–1967)

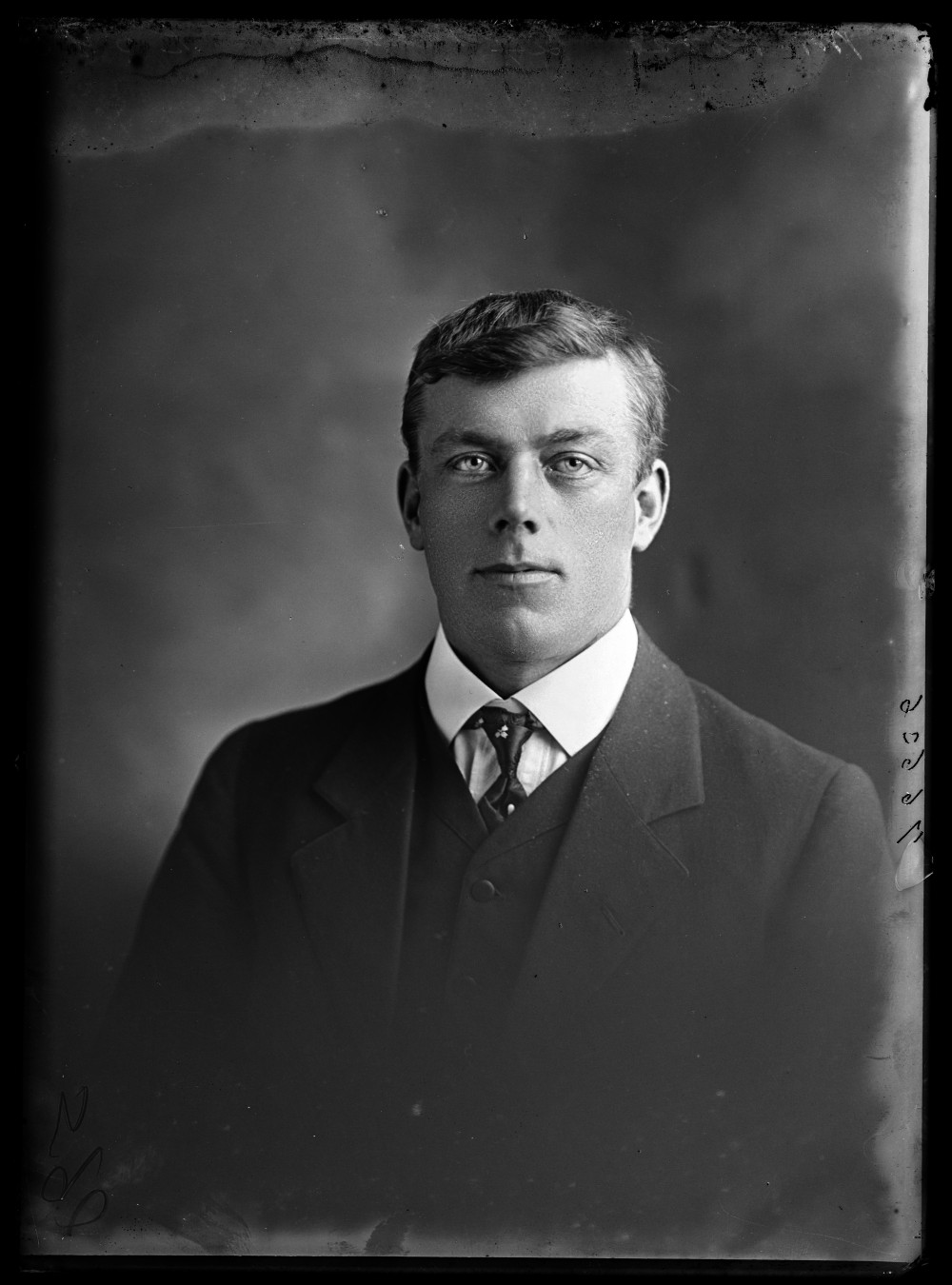
Although there were a few people named 'Mr Roose' in the Auckland area in 1913 (descendants of a Cornish family who arrived in 1859), this image resembles later images of Caesar Roose junior and is also used in a Hamilton Libraries article

Caesar Roose (1886–1967) was a New Zealand ship owner and operator, flax and timber miller, businessman, entrepreneur, community leader and philanthropist. He was born in Mercer, Waikato, New Zealand in 1886.

== Family life ==
He was born on 29 July 1886 to Mary Ashley (died 16 Nov 1942, aged 82), who moved from Shropshire in 1898, and Ceasar (Caesar) Henry Roose (died 29 July 1925, aged 77), who moved from Germany in the 1880s. Their eldest son, Caesar junior, helped on the 67 acres (27 ha) Tuoro Island (in the Waikato River) family farm until he lost an appeal against military service and had to go to Trentham and Featherston military camps in 1918. In 1913, as his shipping business flourished, he had a 5-bedroomed kauri house built on Tuoro Island.

His younger brother, Maurice, who was also qualified as an engineer on small launches, was wounded in World War I and died in 1922.

His sister, Mary, married Eric F. Taylor, of Papatoetoe and lived in Claudelands.

On 3 March 1931 Roose married Australian-born Gladys Ethel Fortescue Wiseman (née Hoare) at Glendale, California; their only child, a daughter, Jeanette Thomas, was born in 1934. He spent his honeymoon observing oil wells and shipping in the United States and Europe. Caesar and Gladys divorced in 1946, a year after her mother died, and on 8 April 1947 he married Fanny Hill (died 1956) in Auckland; there were no children of this marriage. He died in Epsom on 6 July 1967, survived by his daughter. He is buried at Mercer public cemetery.

== Shipping ==
Caesar borrowed £100 to buy his first boat in 1902. In 1904 he ordered the Rawhiti from the shipbuilders Bailey and Lowe, of Auckland. He had a motor launch in 1908.

He earned his river steamer master's certificate in 1909, his engineer's certificate in 1911 and started a regular shipping service between Port Waikato and Cambridge in 1915, but became the representative for a new cooperative, the Waikato Shipping Company (WSC), selling his 2 steamers, 3 launches and 7 barges to them in 1916.

In 1918 he built and launched the Aurora to cater for picnickers, duck-shooters and fishermen.

When WSC went into liquidation in 1922, Roose Shipping Co was formed to buy all the viable assets, including the Huntly coal mine and 6 vessels, which continued regular services on the Waikato and its tributaries.

The largest in the fleet was the 1894 400-passenger steamer, Manuwai, brought from the Whanganui in 1920. In 1924 it ran a Cambridge to Port Waikato excursion 2 or 3 times a year, taking 12 to 14 hours downstream and a few hours longer upstream. Manuwai sank at her moorings in 1938, but was taken to Mercer for repair in 1939, where she was converted to a barge.

In 1924 Caesar visited Glasgow, where he ordered a 400 horsepower (300 kW), 210 feet (64 m) long, 33 feet (10 m) wide, steamer, with a 17 feet (5.2 m) wide stern paddle, also named Rawhiti, assembled at Mercer in 1925. She was able to steam at 11 miles per hour (18 km/h) in still water. Rawhiti and Manuwai carried passengers and goods. In 1926 the Company assembled a steam tug to tow barges.

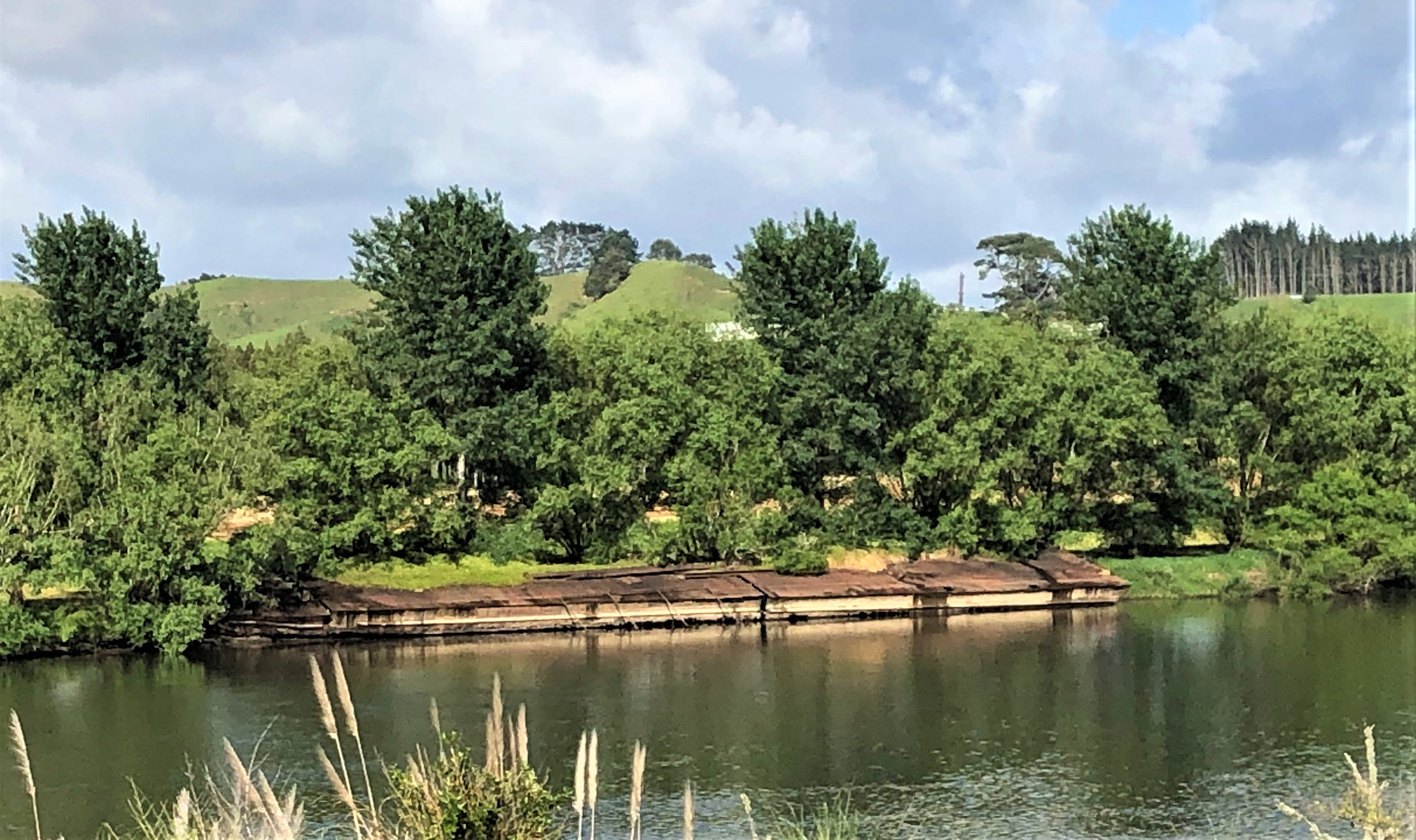
The hulks of former steamers of the Caesar Roose fleet, lie on the Waikato bank opposite Mercer - 2019 photo

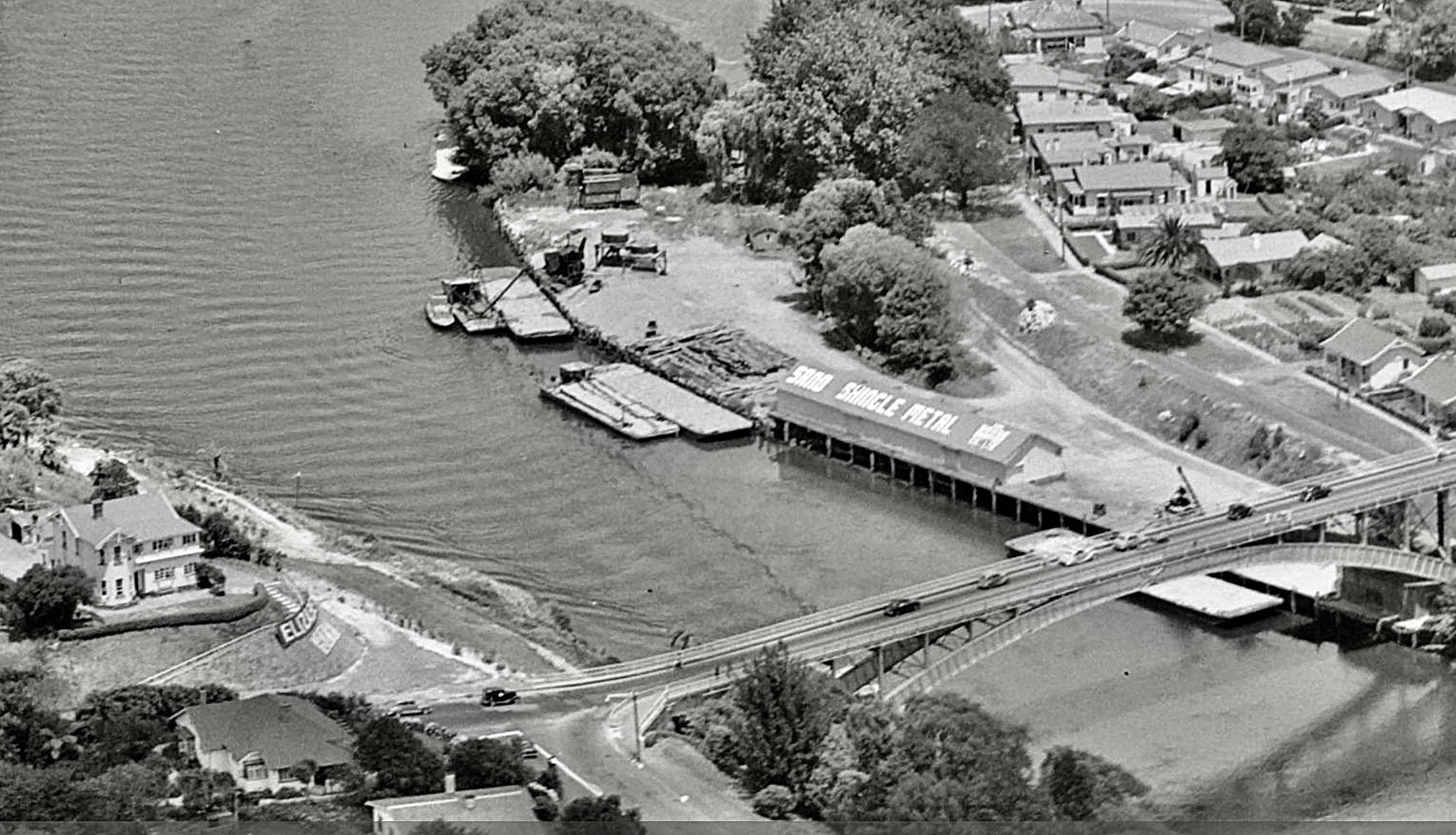
Hamilton wharf in 1954

Trade on the river was also helped by improvements to Hamilton wharf, by Northern Steamship starting a Port Waikato-Onehunga route in 1926 and by Holm Shipping linking to Lyttelton in 1923. Services were disrupted in 1927 by low river levels, partly caused by filling Arapuni. Whilst on honeymoon in Germany in 1931, Caesar bought the Argus (later the Holmglen - not the later ship which sank, MV Holmglen) on behalf of Holm Shipping, in which he was a major shareholder, until Union Steam Ship took control of it. He began a ferry at Mercer in 1932. By 1939 there were 4 ships and a dozen barges. The timetabled services ended in 1946 and the Rawhiti was converted to a barge.

In 1947 an American tank-landing ship became the third of Caesar's ships to be named Rawhiti. It could carry 3,000 tons of cargo to Australia and the Pacific islands and Roose liked its roll on/roll off capability as a means of avoiding the cost of unionised stevedores. In 1948 he founded C. Roose (Fiji) Ltd, but, after the 1951 waterfront dispute, sold the Rawhiti.

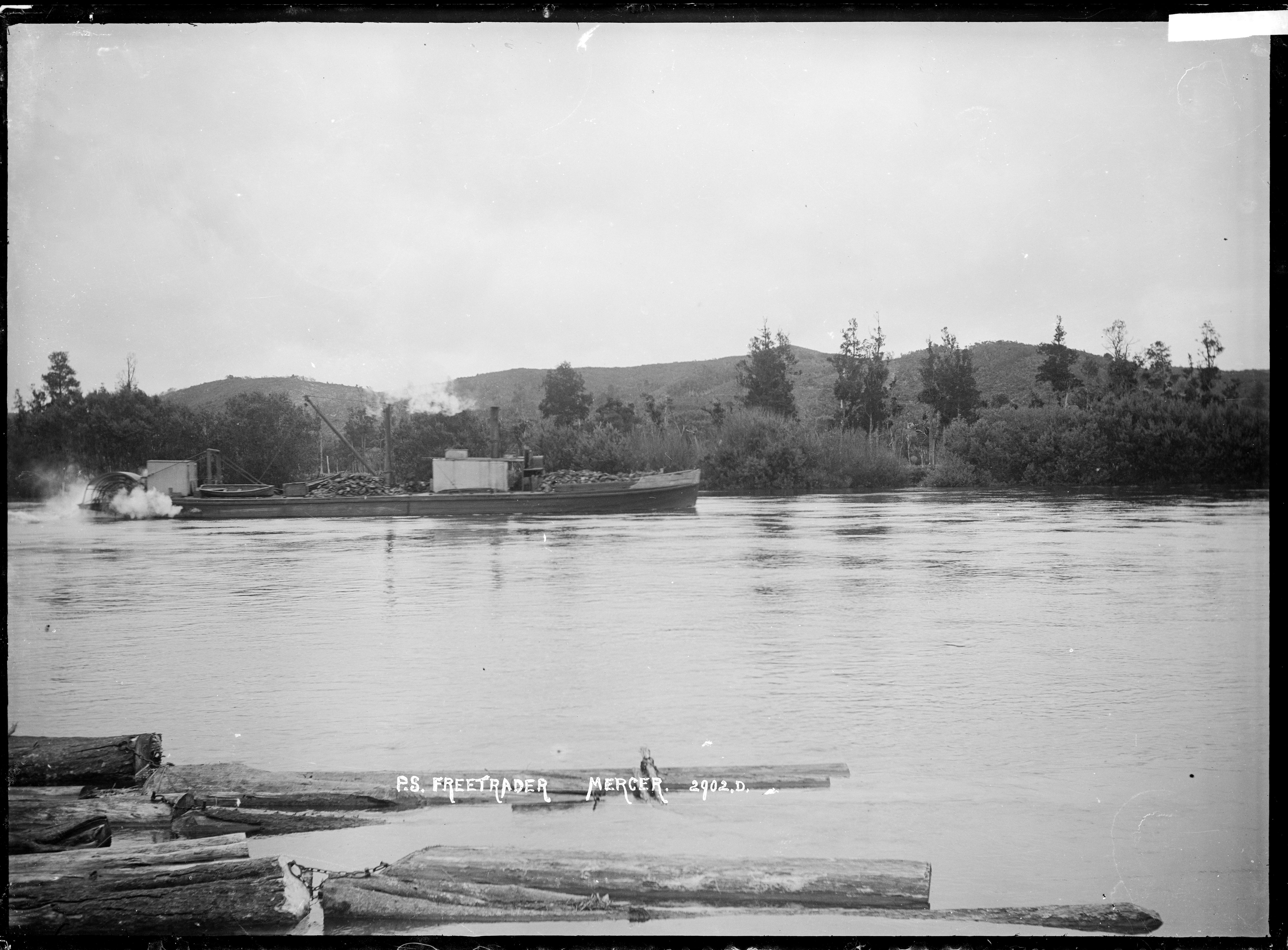
Paddle steamer Freetrader on the Waikato River near Mercer (21453928029)

Several of the old steamers remain under, or beside the river, including the Manuwai, 1925 Rawhiti and Freetrader, on the west bank just south of Mercer.

== Other businesses ==
Caesar took several photos for the Auckland Weekly News between 1905 and 1908. In 1906 he bought a flax mill on the Waikato. By 1922 he had a timber mill at Mercer and also Katikati, later supplying a box factory in Tauranga with kahikatea. In 1933 he patented the Roose–Atkins Grab, used for coaling ships, loading and unloading barges, and salvage work; Roose Shipping Co manufactured the grabs in a workshop on Tuoro Island. The Roose Shipping Co bought a coal mine in 1922, started an open-cast one in 1945, built Fairfield Bridge (1937), helped to build Ngāruawāhia bridge (1956) and formed a trucking fleet.

== Public life ==
He unsuccessfully stood for election to Mercer Town Board in 1914. His lifelong association with Te Puea Herangi began at Mercer School and, in 1921, he helped transport her and about 170 of her people from Mangatāwhiri to Tūrangawaewae. In 1924 Caesar was appointed to a provisional board to control the river. During the 1960s he campaigned vigorously for the dredging of the Waikato, in 1939 campaigned for a dam at Lake Taupō and always supported building a Waiuku–Waikato canal.
