= Alexander Hatrick =

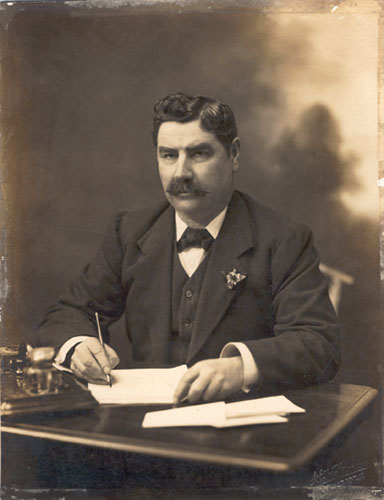
Alexander Hatrick

Alexander Hatrick (29 August 1857 – 30 July 1918) was a New Zealand merchant, shipowner, tourism entrepreneur and mayor.

Hatrick was born in Smythesdale, Colony of Victoria on 29 August 1857, the 2nd of 10 children of Scottish parents Alexander Hatrick, a carpenter, and Margaret Sinclair. In 1875, aged 17, he and 4 friends from Ballarat, went to the West Coast, but soon settled in Whanganui. He worked in a foundry until 1880, when he went into partnership with his brother-in-law, Lewis Walker, for about 4 years as grain, produce and provisions merchants, in Ridgway St. He moved the business to Taupo Quay as a sole trader, then built a warehouse on the corner of the Quay and Hill Streets, with branches in Auckland, Wellington, Waitara, Pipiriki, Raetihi, Sydney and Melbourne. It later had a motor department (by 1918 the largest in the country). He was also managing director of the Spiral Pipe Company and had interests in other businesses. On 2 January 1888 he married Catherine Juliet Carr in Dunedin. He became a member of the Harbour Board in 1887, was a Borough Councillor from 1890 and Mayor from 1897 to 1904, during which time the council took over the gas works, took water from Okehu, the opera house, extended the town and he was president of the Beautifying Society, of which he was a joint founder in 1910.

Hatrick was ill for about 18 months, before dying of a seizure. He left a widow, who died on 30 November 1949, and was survived by 2 sons, Alexander and Ronald (died 1964), and 4 daughters, Winifred the eldest, Margaret Smith, Katherine and Alexa, his youngest, who died on 21 February 1945. He was buried at Aramoho Cemetery.

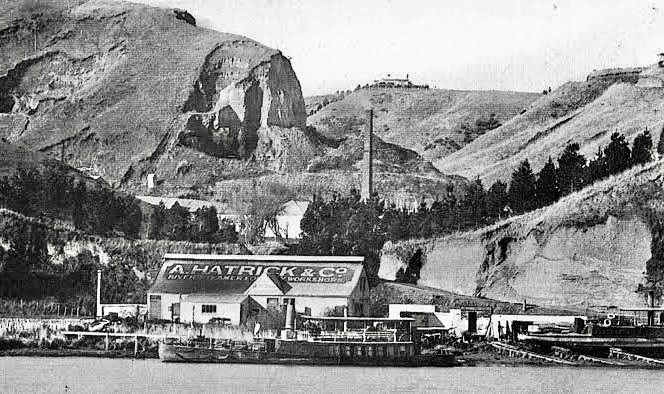
A Hatrick & Co, Sedgebrook works and slipway

Most buildings belonging to Hatrick have been demolished. His house in Ingestre Street became a plumbing depot, his 1910 house on St John’s Hill was demolished to build Alexa Place subdivision in the 1970s and his offices on the corner of St Hill Street and Taupo Quay are now a car park for the Trafalgar Square Shopping Centre, built in 1987. Little remains of the Sedgebrook works and slipway in Whanganui East, which was working between at least 1897 and 1926. A 2-storey office and crew accommodation building of about 1904 remains on Taupo Quay and has Class B protection.

== Shipping and tourism ==
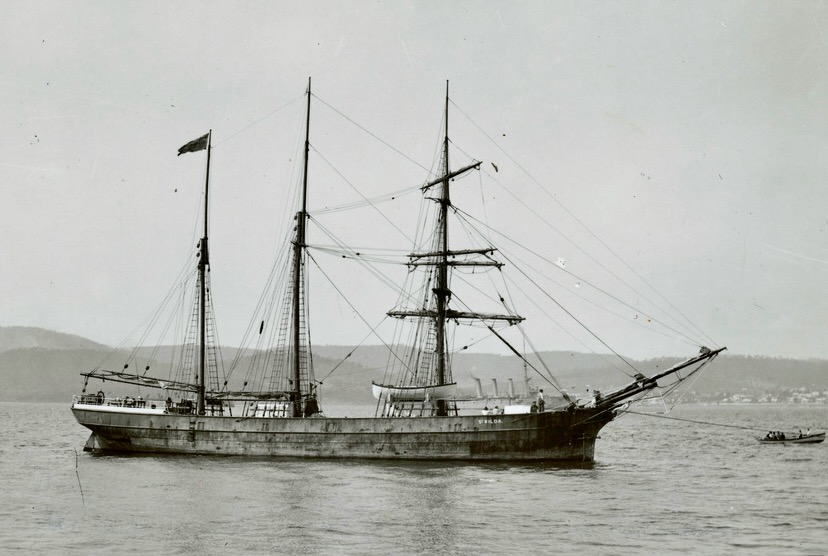
St Kilda

=== Trans-Tasman sailing ships ===
In December 1888 Walker & Hatrick bought the former Brunner Coal Co, St. Kilda, to run to and from Newcastle. She was a 189GT, 3 masted schooner, 127.3 ft (38.8 m) x 22 ft (6.7 m) x 10.1 ft (3.1 m), built by J. Fullerton, Merksworth Works, Paisley in 1868 and sold that November to a Melbourne firm. Hatrick sold her in 1903 to buy a larger ship. By 1929 St Kilda had been abandoned on Bishop Island.

The larger ship was Alexa, named after Hatrick's youngest daughter, a 343GT, steel, barquentine, 143 ft (44 m) x 26 ft (7.9 m) x 10.5 ft (3.2 m), originally named Voorberg, launched in July 1904 by Verstock & Co, Martenshoek. She left London on 10 August 1904, but was delayed until 8 March 1905 in reaching Whanganui. She was sold to On Chong & Co, Sydney in 1912. She was the last square-rigged sail ship registered in Australia, when she caught fire on 30 January 1929 at Butaritari.

In September 1911, when she was beached at Whanganui, Hatrick bought another Dutch, steel, barquentine, Carla, and her cargo of 450 tons of coal at a wreck auction for £290. He refloated and renamed her as Wanganui. She was 341GT, 134.2 ft (40.9 m) x 26.2 ft (8.0 m) x 10.7 ft (3.3 m), launched on 13 February 1902, also by Verstock, as the Vorlichter. He sold her in 1916 and she was again sold in Auckland in 1922, converted to a hulk in August 1924 and used by the Northern Steamship Company until February 1948, when she was stripped and scuttled outside of Cuvier Island.

=== Whanganui River services ===
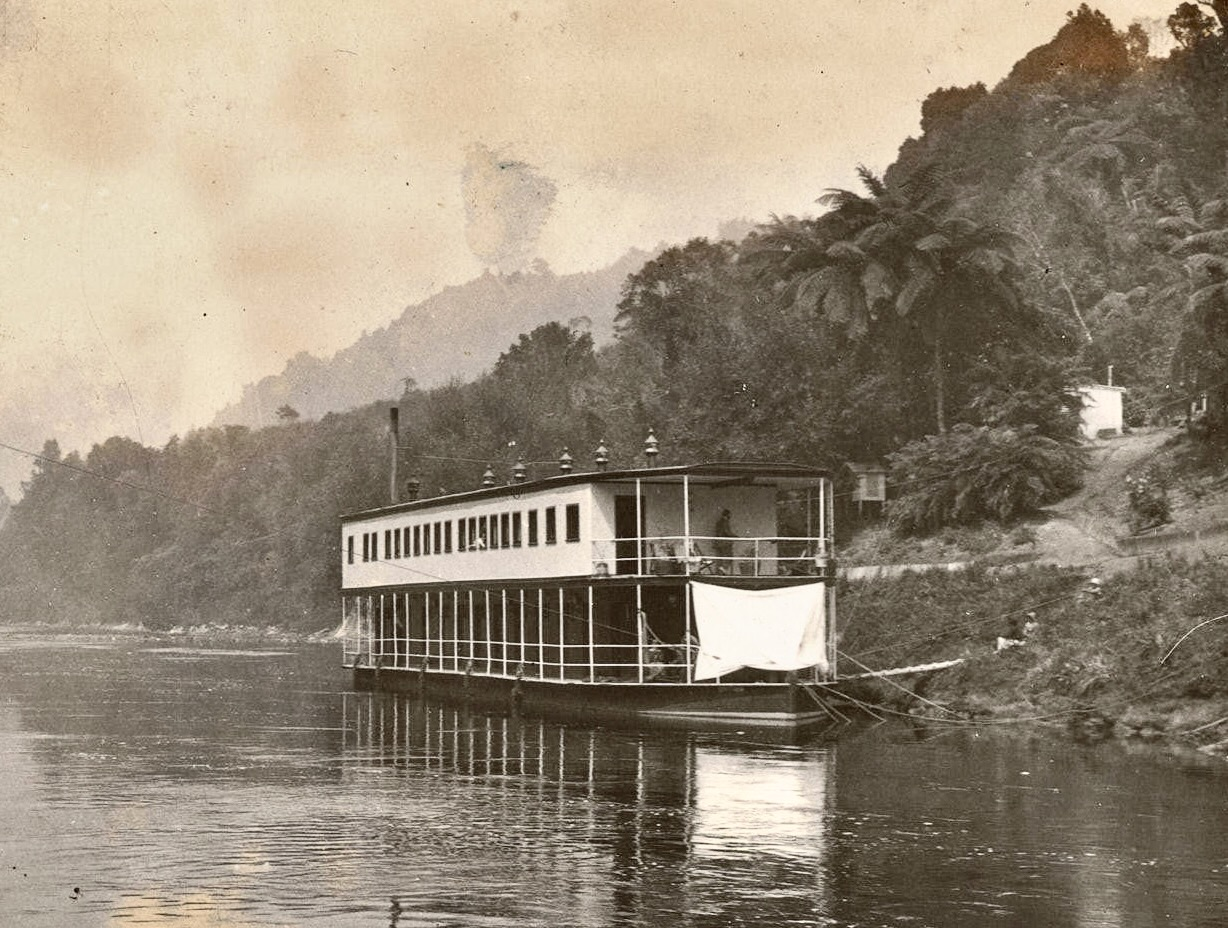
Makere houseboat in 1914

Hatrick opened the Whanganui River as a tourist route after others had failed, got his first river boat, the paddle-steamer Wairere in late 1891 and a government mail contract for the 55 mi (89 km) to Pipiriki from 1892. By April 1892 he had a contract with Thomas Cook & Son to carry tourists and on 24 May Wairere started a weekly mail, passenger and cargo service to Pipiriki, joined in 1894 by the Manuwai (400 passengers) and in 1897 by the Ohura (145 passengers).

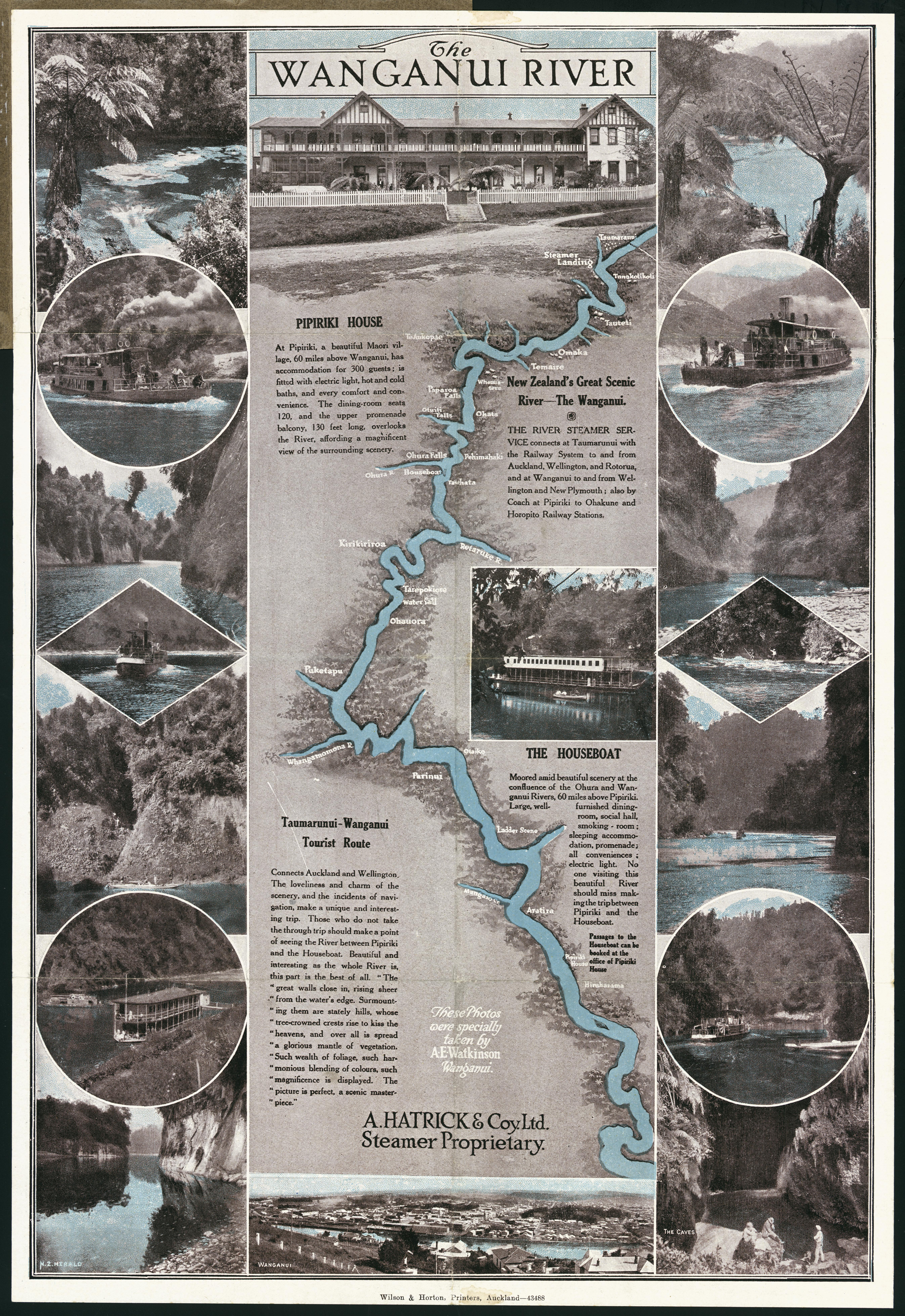
A Hatrick & Co map of 1910s

In July 1901 Hatrick bought Pipiriki House, the only accommodation there, and in 1902 replaced part of it with a tourist hotel. At the end of 1903 cables were laid so his ships could be winched over the fastest rapids to reach another 89 mi (143 km) to Taumarunui, which was then the terminus of the railway from Auckland. Hatrick & Co launched a houseboat at Taumarunui on 6 April 1904, named Makere. It took over 4 weeks to lower her down 35 mi (56 km) of the Whanganui River, for use by December 1904 at the mouth of the Ōhura River, 30 mi (48 km) from Taumarunui and 60 mi (97 km) from Pipiriki. She was 98 ft (30 m) x 22 ft (6.7 m), with 36 berths on the lower deck and electric light. He could then provide a 3-day service from Whanganui or Taumarunui, with overnight stops at Pipiriki House and the houseboat. In 1916 complaints were made about lack of maintenance of the river and Hatrick threatened to suspend services. After pressure in 1925 to end a subsidy, equivalent to £2 per passenger, in 1927 the River Trust decided that maintenance of the top 12 mi (19 km) from Te Maire to Taumarunui could be cut, as the river fell 144 ft (44 m), through 38 rapids and new roads were being built. The houseboat was moved downstream, to a channel dredged for it at the mouth of the Retaruke River, with a slipway for its maintenance. The river was narrow enough for planks to connect the boat to both banks. From 1929 services to Taumarunui ended and by 1932 the river was unnavigable beyond Kirikau and boats ran only between Whanganui and the houseboat, which caught fire and sank in 1933. By 1944 the river was too shallow for steamers to go beyond Hipango Park.

Pipiriki House burnt down on 10 March 1909, but within 11 months Hatrick had replaced it with one of the most up-to-date tourist hotels in New Zealand, which burnt down in 1959. By December 1911 he had 12 large vessels and 7 smaller boats on the river, with workshops in Whanganui and Taumarunui. The foundry and workshop in Wanganui were on the Shakespeare’s Cliff side of the river from about 1904. When A Hatrick & Co was re-organised in 1928, the riverboat services continued as Wanganui River Service Ltd, managed by Ronald Hatrick. The company closed in 1958. By 1963 the Waireka was alone and only able to travel a short distance up the river.

He complained that forestry was making the river less attractive and reducing summer water flows. In June 1908 the Lands Department decided 19,000 acres (7,700 ha) should be protected.

In the early 1880s PWD had barges on the river to clear snags, with a houseboat for their engineers at Pipiriki. They reached to within 12 mi of Pipiriki when Whanganui businessmen set up a company to take over the work with Tuhua. The company failed and no further work was done until Hatrick got a 4-year £2,000 contract for a weekly mail service to Pipiriki from April 1892.

==== Fleet ====
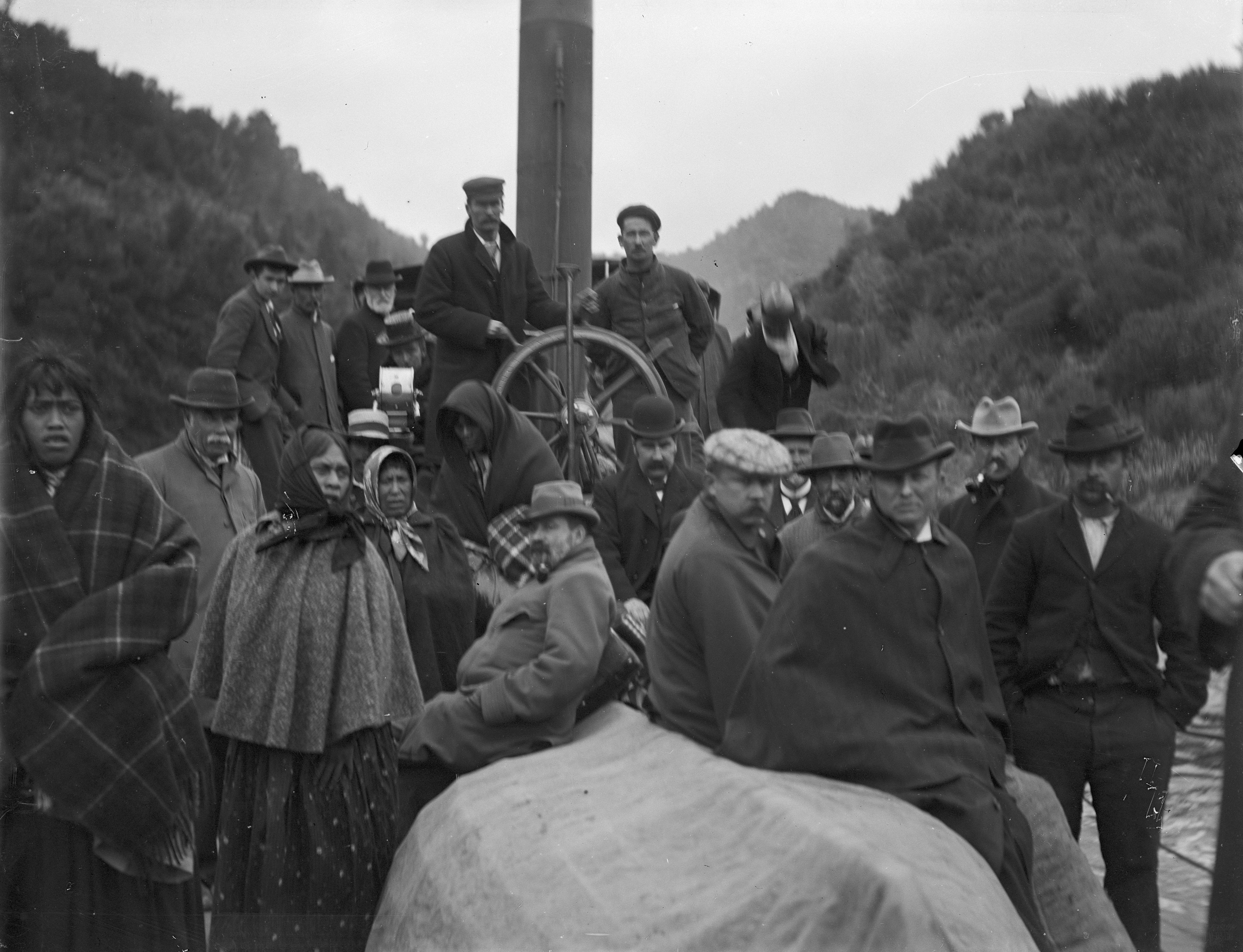
Ohura, on Whanganui River. Alexander Hatrick in bowler hat (centre)

- Manuwai 1894 built by Yarrow, Poplar, stern wheel paddle steamer, assembled in Whanganui, sold to Waikato 1920, for 400 passengers
- Moa a launch
- Ohura launched 22 July 1897 to serve about 14 mi (23 km) of the Tāngarākau River, 77 ft (23 m) x 12 ft (3.7 m) x 1 ft (0.30 m) 13 mph (21 km/h), for 200 passengers, capsized 1940 with loss of 3 crew, used as a barge until 1950s and left near Cobham Bridge
- Ongarue launched on 5 January 1904, a 60 ft (18 m) launch, for 65 passengers
- Otunui by Yarrow, 1908, 60 ft (18 m) x 8 ft (2.4 m) x 3.7 ft (1.1 m) 4-cylinder 40 hp (30 kW) oil engine 10 kn (19 km/h; 12 mph), 80 passengers She may have sunk in 1949, but was relicensed in 1950. She was sold in 1961 as Tangahoe. In 1972 she was driven on to a shingle bed near Pipiriki in a storm, but rebuilt as a diesel passenger ship, but then moved to the Waikato and in 1982 to Lake Ōkataina, with paddle wheels added. In 1984 she moved back to the Whanganui, then back to the Waikato in 1988. In 2002 she was refitted, but damaged by fire in 2003. She was rebuilt and went to Paeroa in 2006, Lake Whakamaru and was at the Waimarino Adventure Park, Tauranga 2009-2015. She then served Bridge to Nowhere and in 2026 was moved to Whanganui.
- Parinui a launch with a 5 hp (3.7 kW) engine, built for the Tāngarākau River
- Taniwha was built for Taumarunui River Services 30 hp (22 kW) Ailsa Craig engine, 10 kn (19 km/h; 12 mph), 54 ft (16 m) x 5.4 ft (1.6 m)
- Wai-iti by Yarrow, launched on 12 April 1901 by Ryan & Co, Auckland, the first tunnel boat in the country, 40 ft (12 m) x 8 ft (2.4 m), with 14 hp (10 kW), or 10 hp (7.5 kW), Union oil engine, driving tunnel propellers, 60 ft (18 m) x 8.5 ft (2.6 m), sank in 1924, passengers and crew were rescued
- Waimarie by Yarrow, 1899 100.2 ft (30.5 m) x 16 ft (4.9 m) bought in 1902 and renamed from Aotea, 300 passengers, returned to service in 2000
- Waione launched on 25 January 1902, with seats for 100, powered by two triple expansion tube engines, driving 4 propellers, 2 in each tube, for 300 passengers, used as a barge until 1950s and left near Cobham Bridge
- Waiora launched on 10 December 1904 as a steam launch for Pipiriki to Taumarunui, for 87 passengers which could be brought close in to the bank and boarded on a plank
- Waireka a launch, built in 1909, which could also be brought close in to the bank She was sold in the 1950s and has since been used on several waterways, including Lake Ōhakuri. In 2023 she was returned to Whanganui for repairs.
- Wairere launched on 18 November 1891, at a cost of £4,500 100 ft (30 m) x 14 ft (4.3 m) for 250 passengers
- Wairua by Yarrow, launched on 10 December 1904 as a steam launch for Pipiriki to Taumarunui, for 87 passengers. with a 66 hp (49 kW) Simpson & Strickland compound engine, replaced by a Thornycroft oil engine in 1913, converted to a pontoon in 1938, salvaged in 1987, re-launched in March 2006 and fitted with a 90 hp (67 kW) Gardner 6LW-20
- Wakanui a launch laid up about 1937
- Wakapai made her first trip on 27 December 1905. From 1928, she and Ohura replaced Wairere on the Pipiriki service and her steam engine was replaced by a 75 hp (56 kW) Thorneycroft diesel, for 100 passengers, ran aground in a rapid near Ranana in 1951.
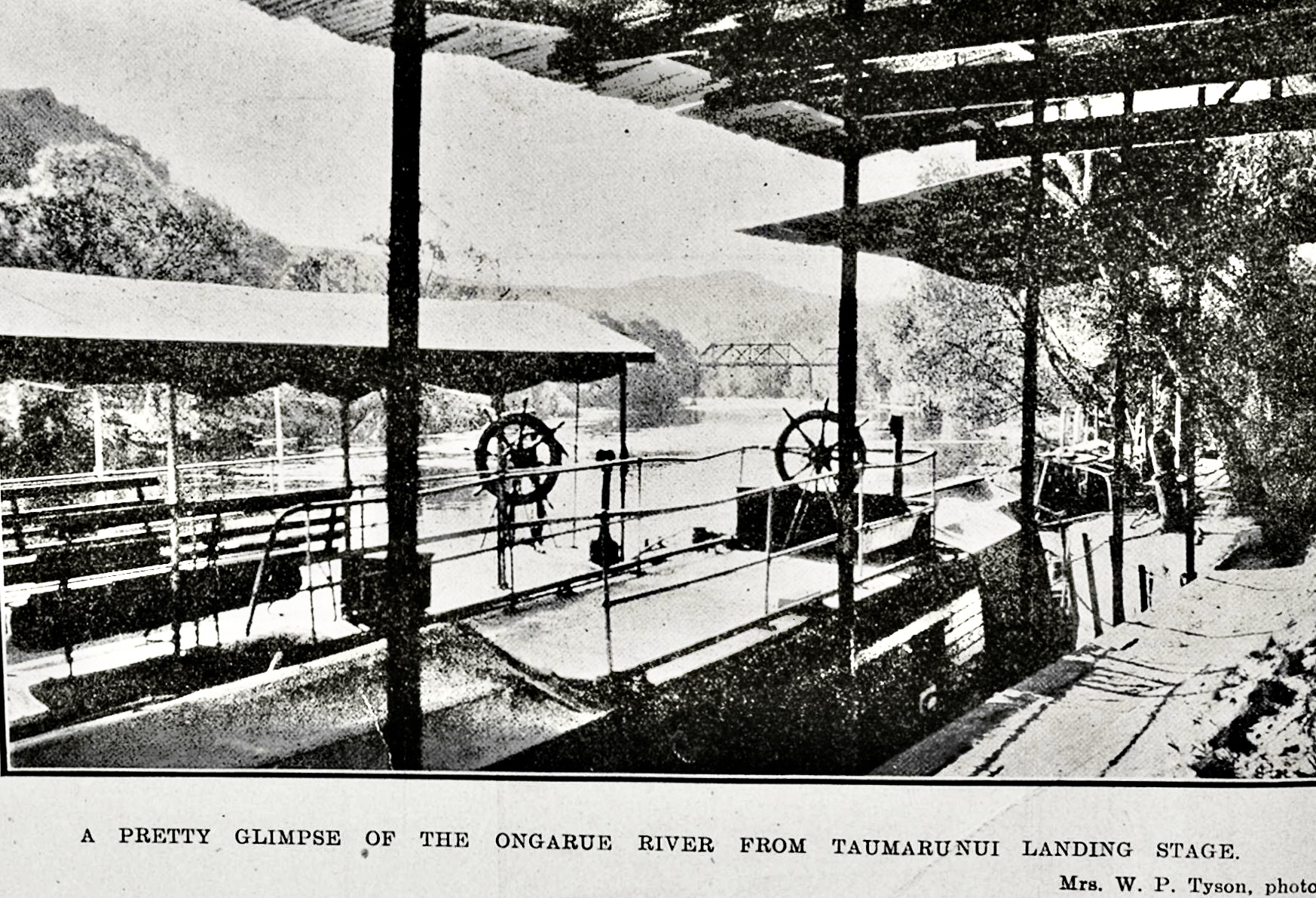
Taumarunui landing in 1923

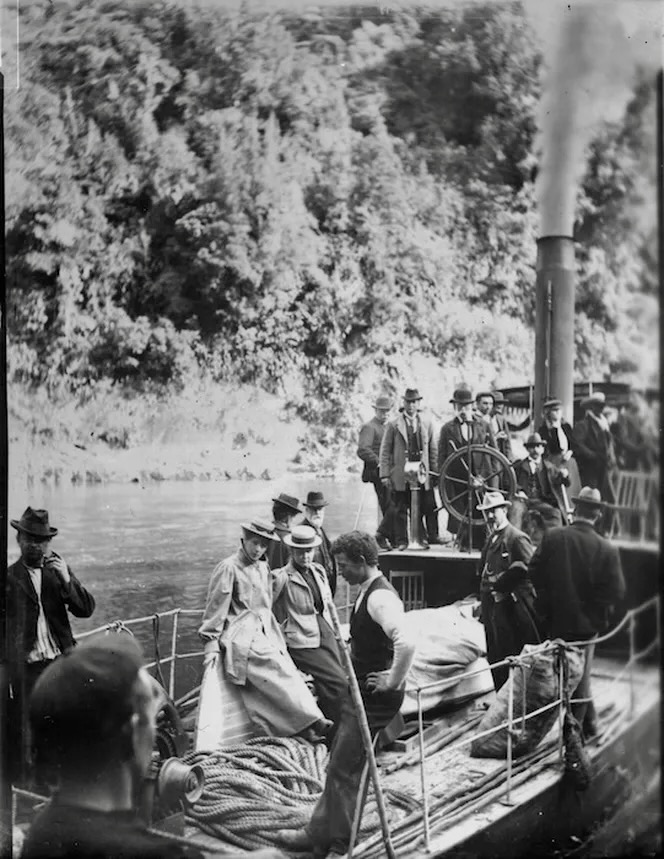
Ohura in 1905

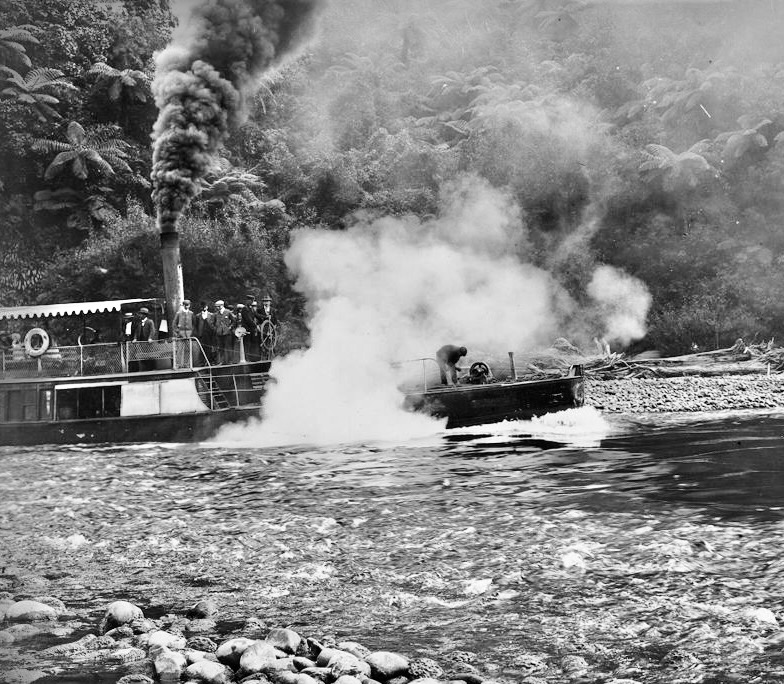
Ohura in Ngaporo Rapid about 1908

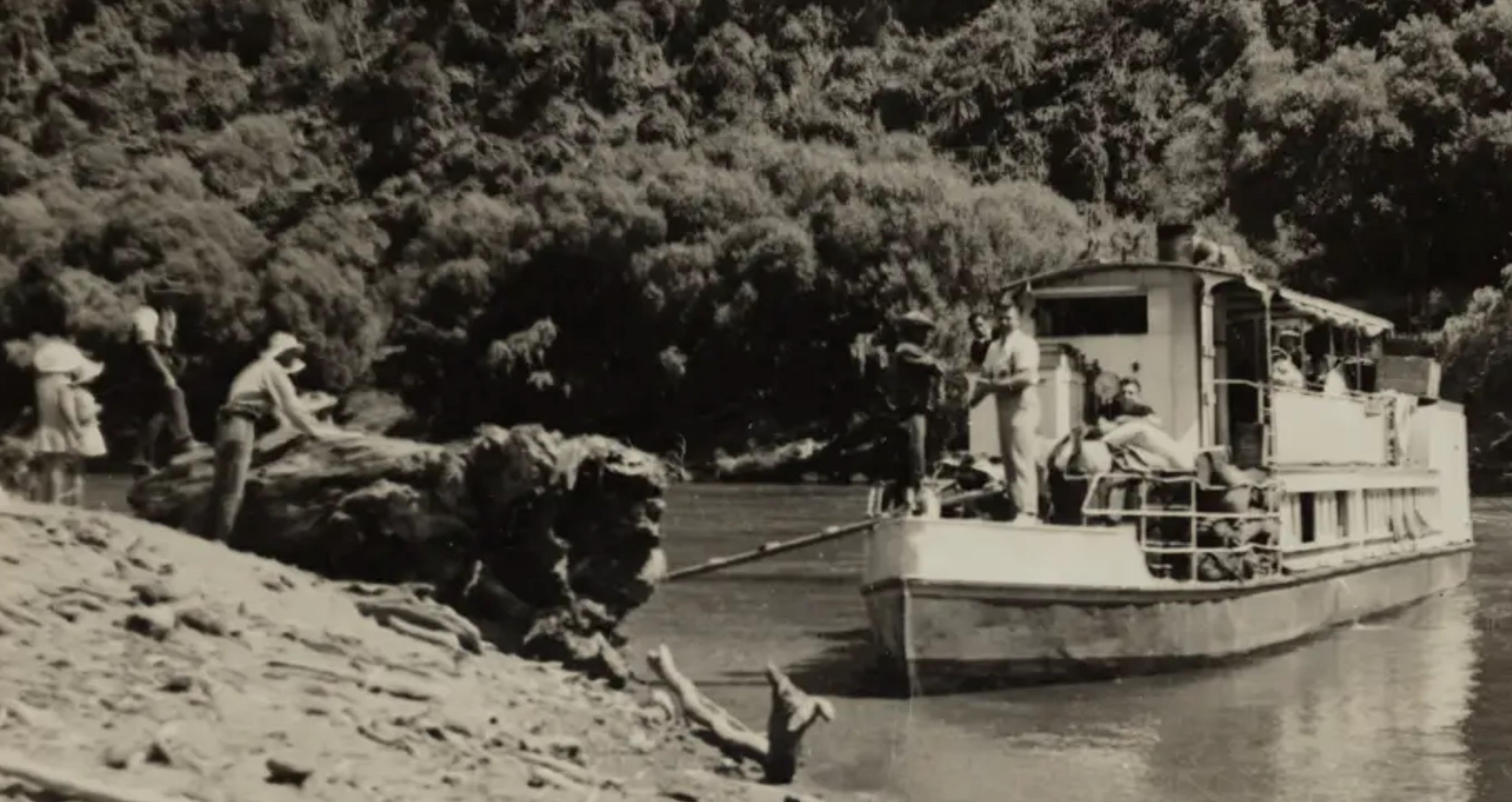
Ongarue picking up mail about 1930

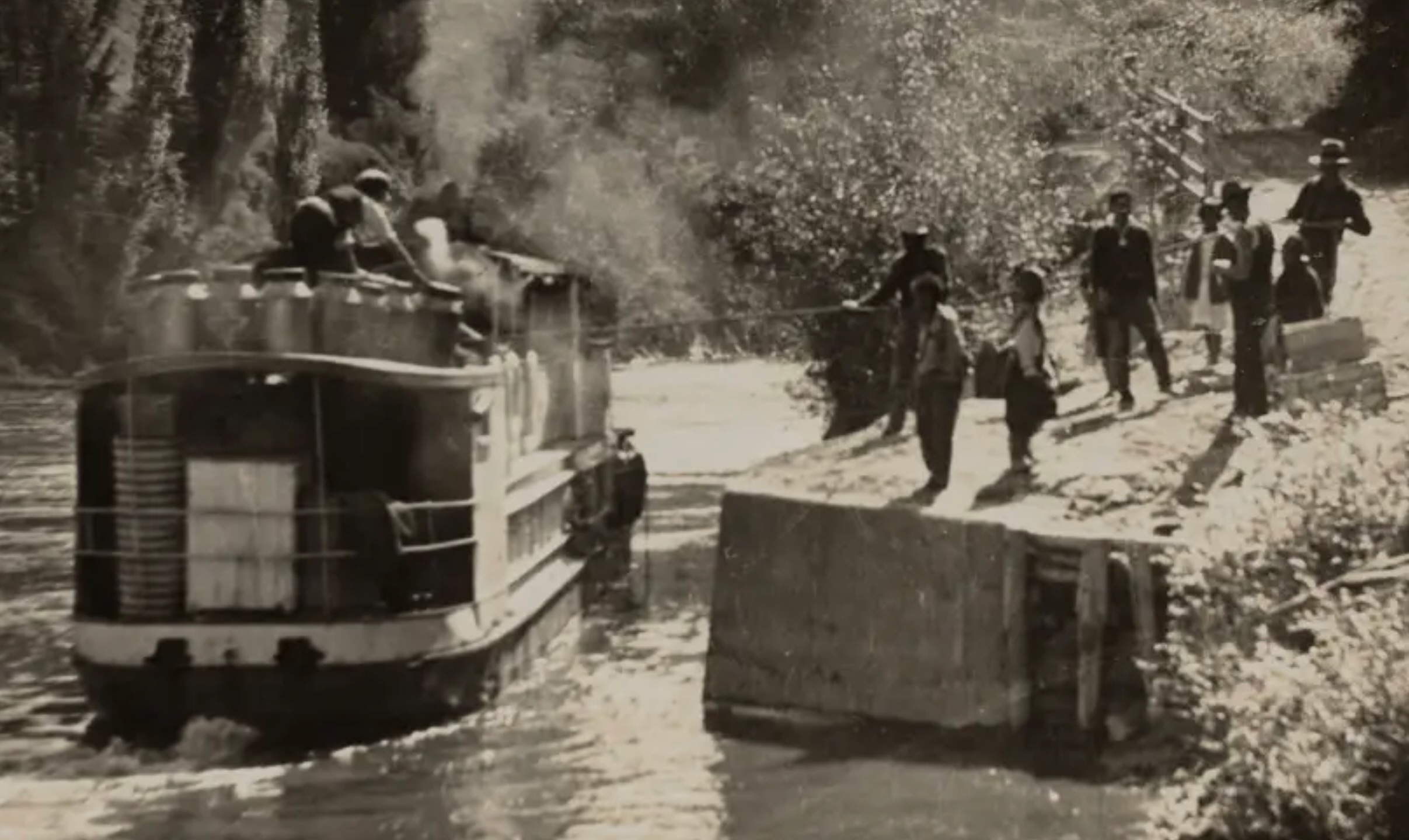
Ongarue with cream cans about 1930

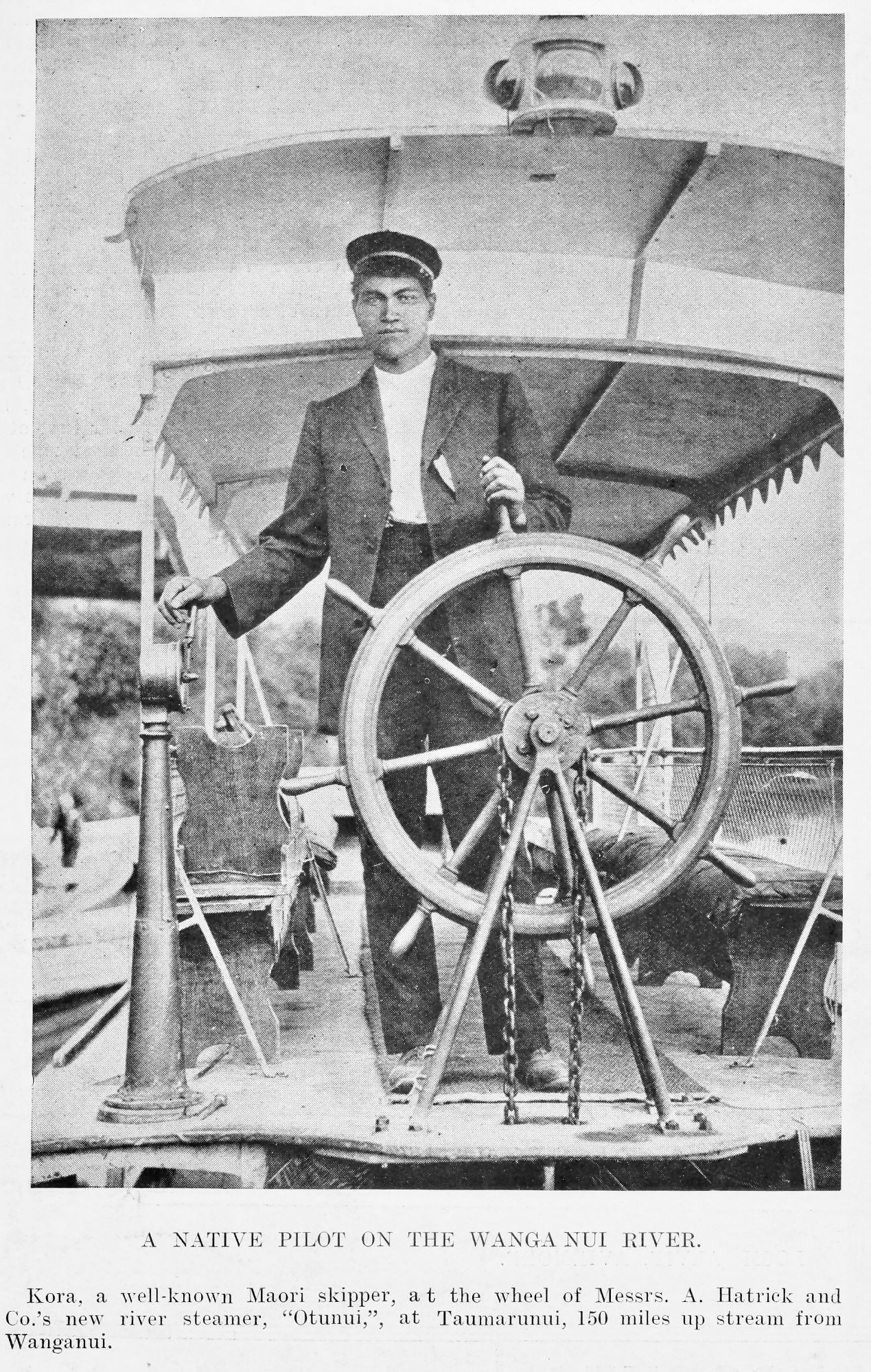
Otunui skipper Kora

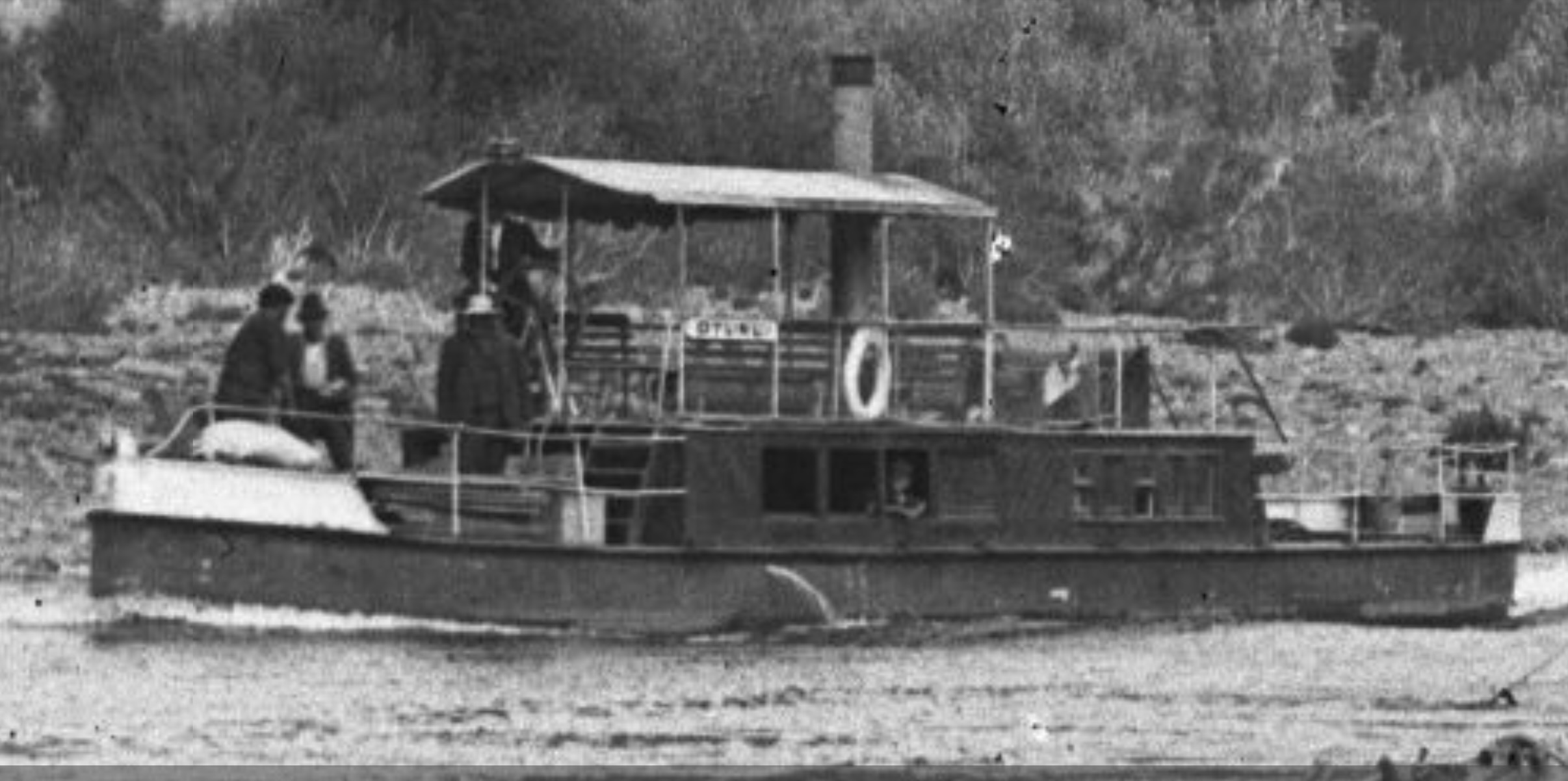
Otunui between 1913 and 1921

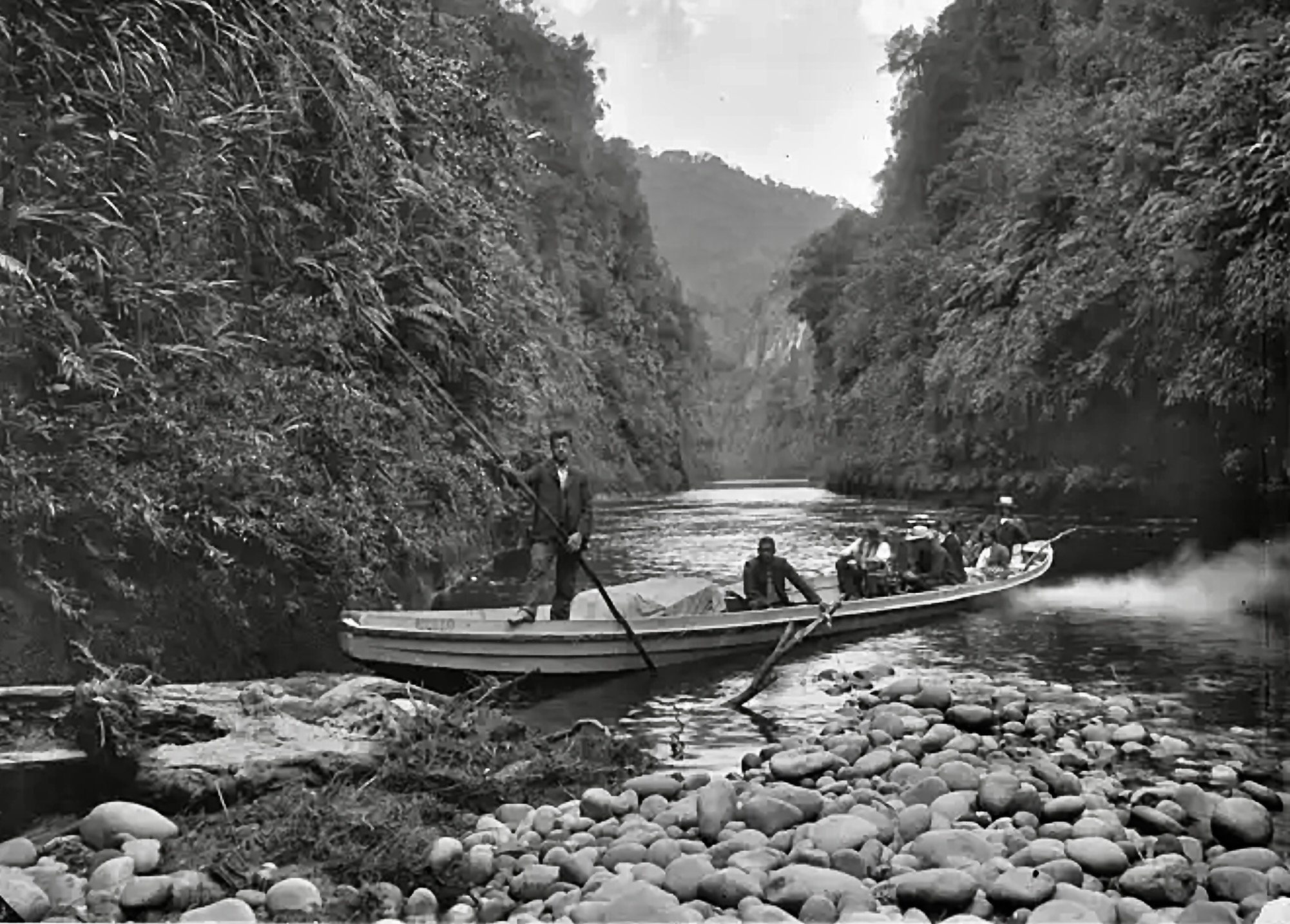
Parinui about 1900

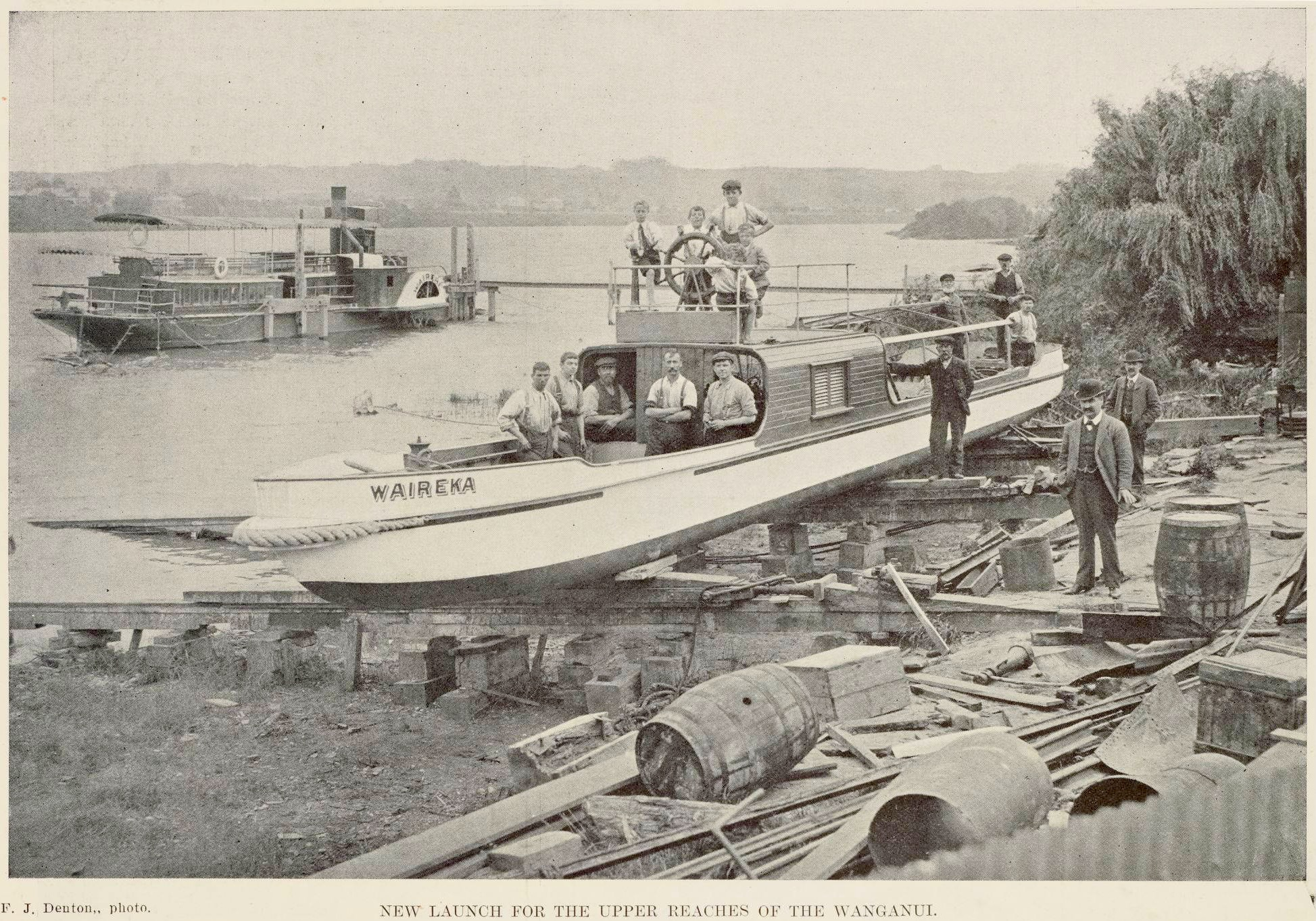
Waireka in 1909. Wairere behind

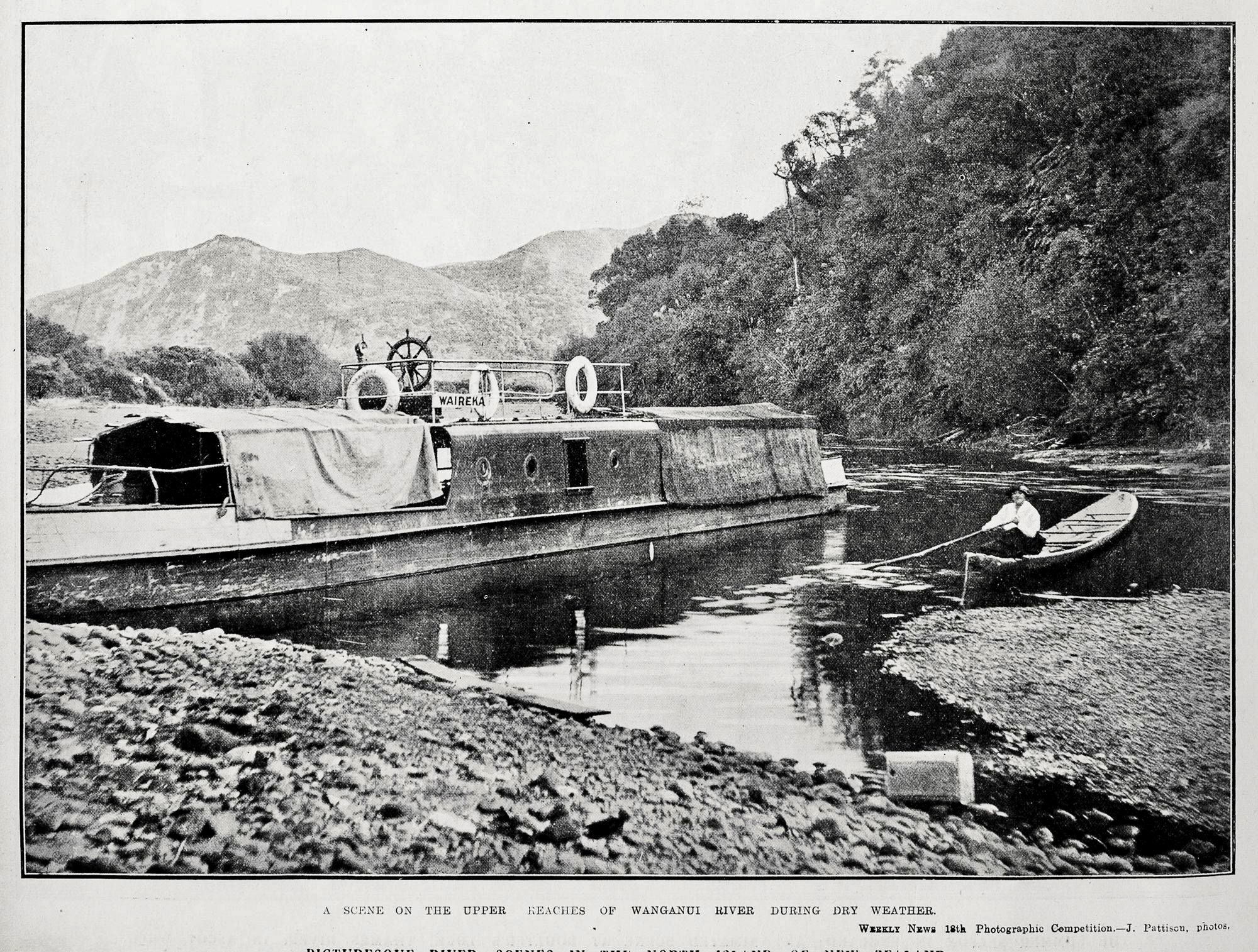
Waireka in 1921

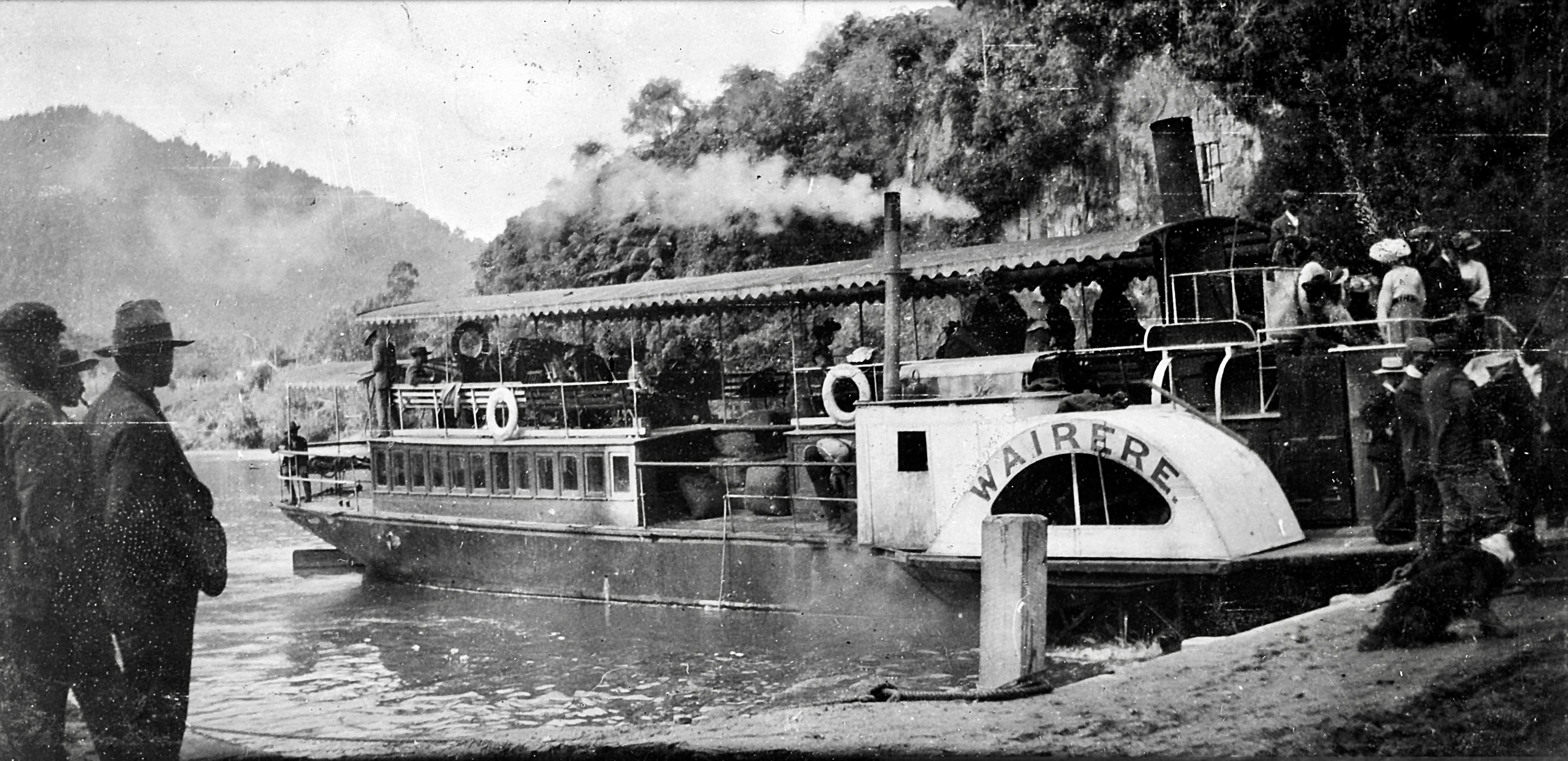
Wairere at Pipiriki about 1910

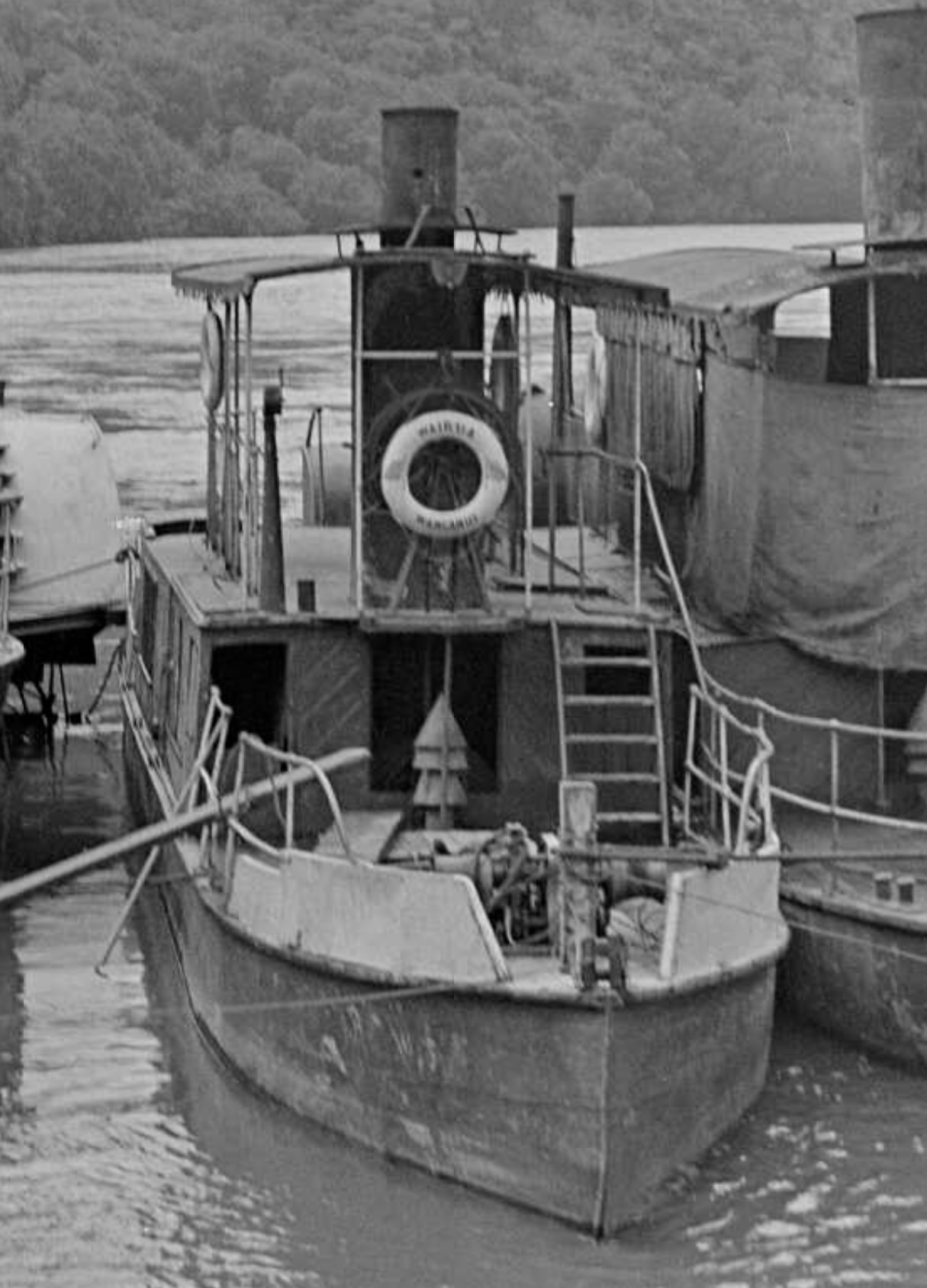
Wairua about 1910

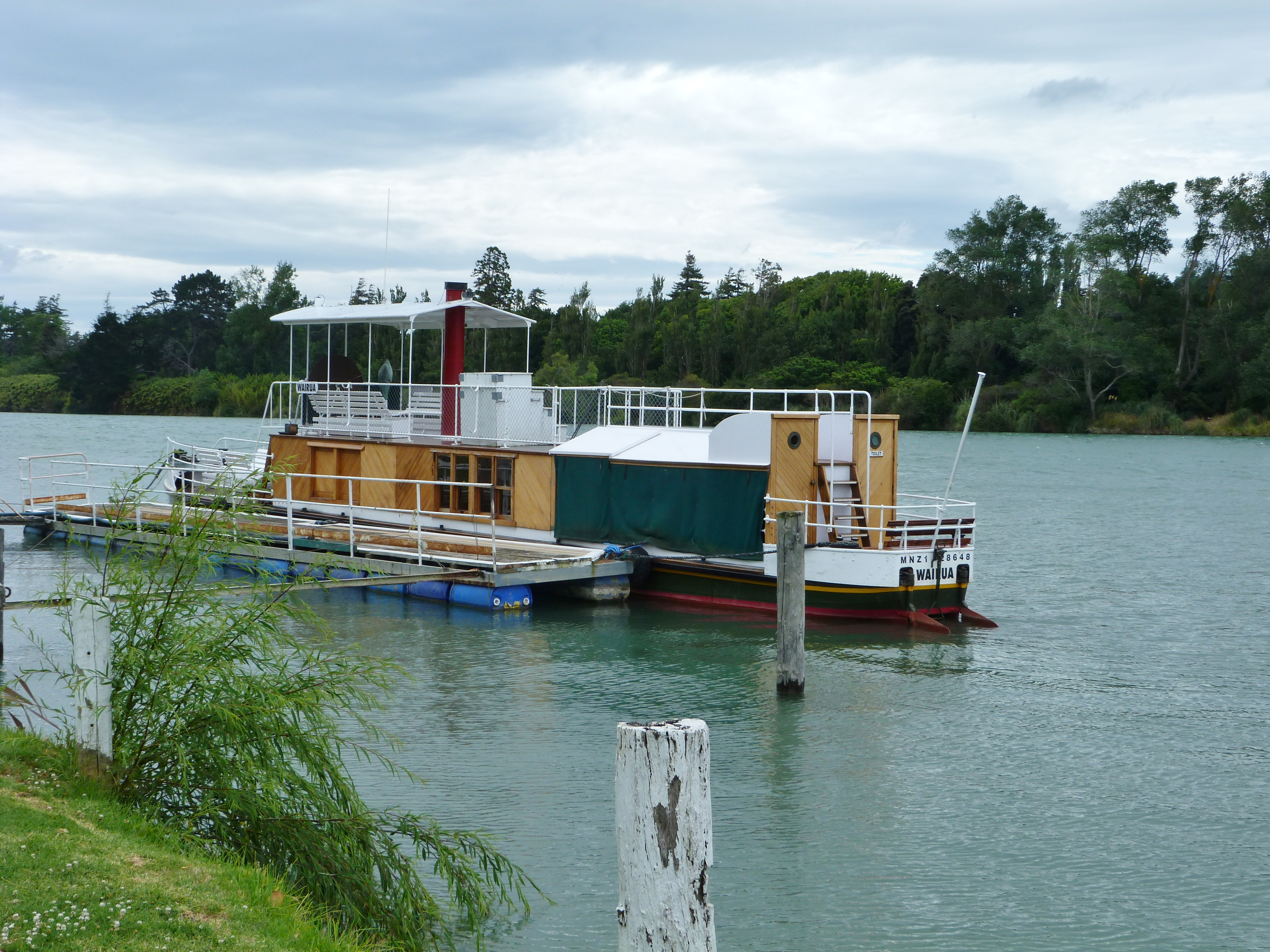
Wairua in 2013

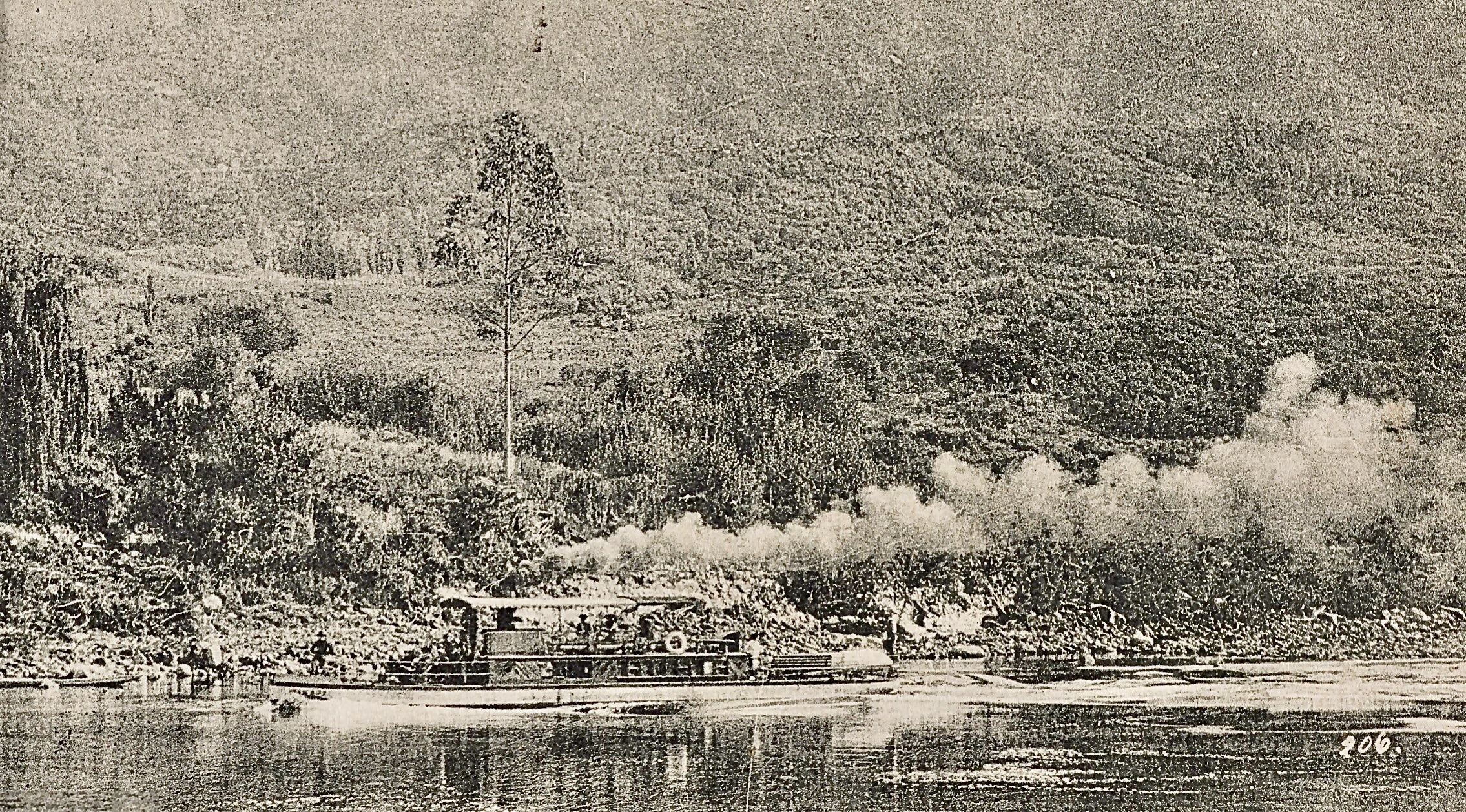
Wakapai in the Big Paparoa rapids

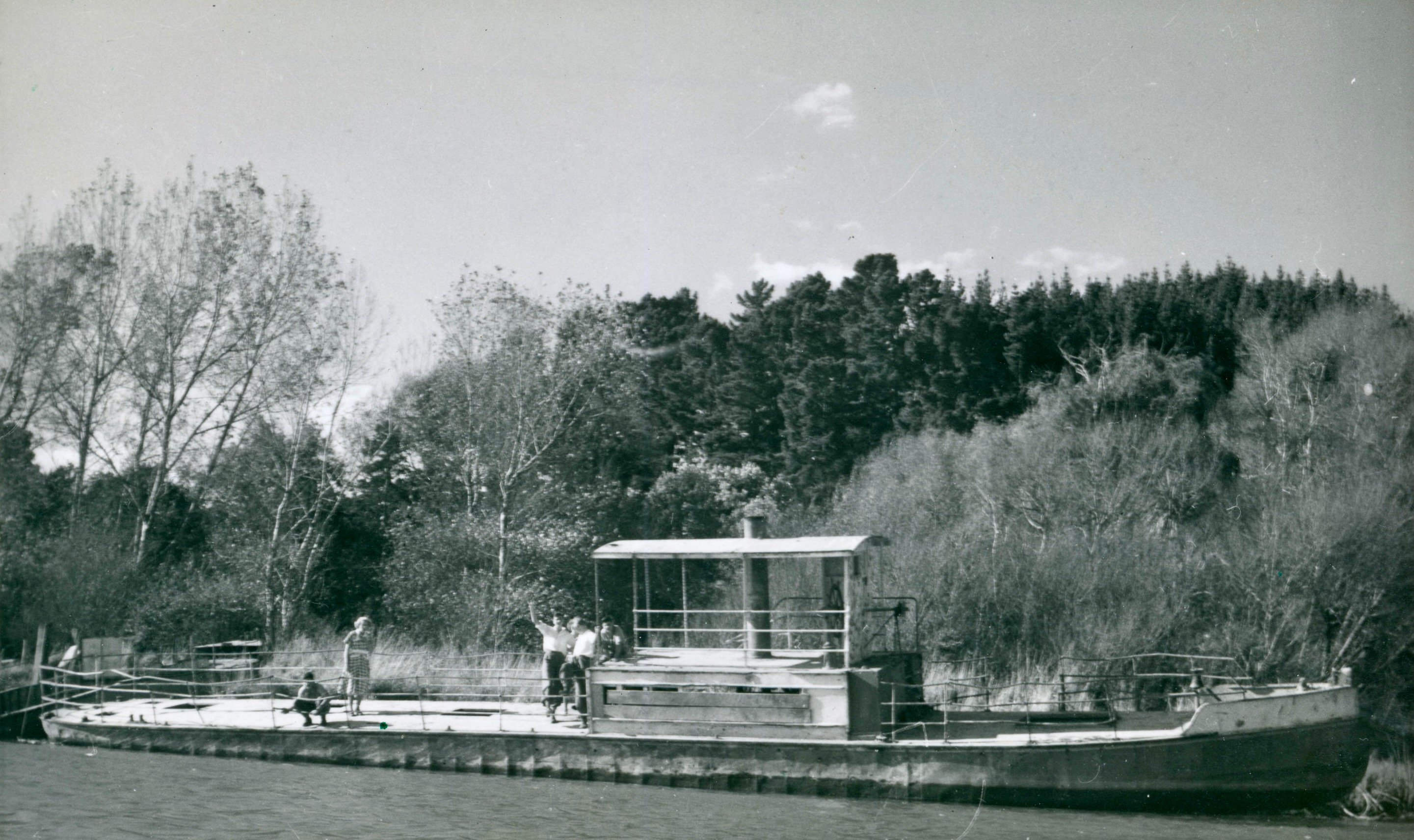
Wakapai about 1930
