= Chas Poynter =

New Zealand mayor

Charles Ernest Poynter QSO JP (8 February 1939 – 20 August 2007) was the mayor of Wanganui from 1986 to 2004. He was prominent in opposing the Māori occupation of Moutoa Gardens in 1995.

== Early life ==
Poynter was born in 1939. As a boy, he was "inquisitive, totally mischievous" and "always the leader and organiser". He was a bookseller—a business he inherited from his father and located in Victoria Avenue, the main shopping area of Wanganui.

== Political career ==
He was elected to the Wanganui City Council as a councillor in 1977, re-elected in 1980 and stood for the mayoralty in 1983 upon the retirement of Mayor Ron Russell. He polled as runner-up to Doug Turney and was made deputy mayor in 1983 as a consequence. In 1986, he challenged Turney and was successful, winning with a majority of 1529 votes.

In 1989 he increased his majority, defeating challenger John Blaikie by almost 6,000 votes. This was the first election under the new local government boundaries with Wanganui City incorporating Wanganui County and some of Waitotara County. Blaikie was the chairman of the Wanganui County Council prior to the reorganisation. The new territorial authority was named 'Wanganui District Council'.

In 1992, Poynter was challenged by Wanganui greengrocer Randhir Dahya, a popular Indian businessman. His majority was cut to just 939 votes (Wanganui Chronicle of 20 October 1992). Dahya challenged him twice more, in 1995 and 1998, but Poynter easily resisted these challenges, assisted by his handling of the Moutoa Gardens occupation of 1995 and the death of his wife of 40 years, Joy, four months prior to the 1998 election.

In the 1993 New Year Honours, Poynter was appointed a Companion of the Queen's Service Order for public services.

In 2001, he retained the mayoralty with just 27% of the vote, warding off four councillor challengers. In 2004, he stood again and was defeated, polling third behind media personality Michael Laws and businessman John Martin with just 20% of the vote.

== Personal life and death ==
Poynter was chairman of Wanganui Gas from its inception in 1992 until his retirement from the role on 14 December 2005. He died in 2007. He was survived by two daughters and a son.

Consultation was carried out in 2009 by Wanganui District Council to rename Wikitoria Road, connecting State Highway 3 and Wanganui Airport, to Chas Poynter Drive. Wikitoria was a daughter of Te Keepa Te Rangihiwinui and was named after Queen Victoria, and the Putiki iwi strongly objected to it. Poynter’s children also rejected this proposal believing their father would also object to the name change being disrespectful to the iwi. The proposal did not go ahead.
