= Bill Rogers (New Zealand politician) =

New Zealand politician (1887–1971)

The Honourable Bill Rogers OBE
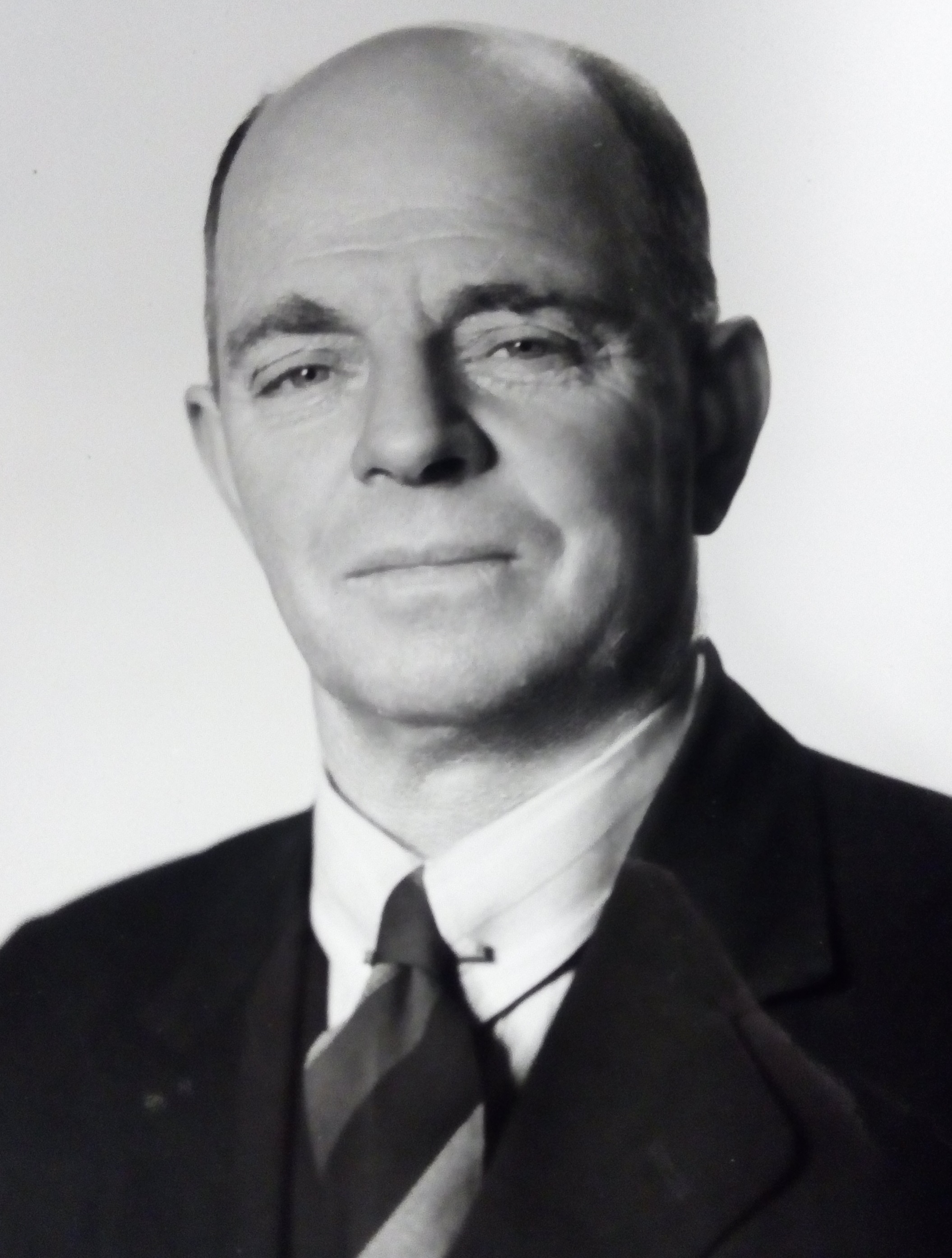

Member of the Legislative Council
- In office 15 July 1940 – 31 December 1950
- Appointed by: Peter Fraser

Personal details
- Born: William James Rogers; 10 January 1887
- Died: 6 July 1971 (aged 84) New Zealand
- Party: Labour Party
- Relations: Philip Blakeley (son-in-law)

William James Rogers OBE (10 January 1887 – 6 July 1971) was a New Zealand politician. He was a long-serving Mayor of Wanganui, and a member of the New Zealand Legislative Council from 1940 until its abolition in 1950.

== Biography ==
Rogers worked as gardener and miner at Denniston and became involved in trade unionism via the Miners' Union. He was later the secretary of the Wanganui Watersiders' Union. Rogers' daughter, Ida, married electrical engineer Philip Blakeley in 1938.

Rogers was Mayor of Wanganui from 1927 to 1931, and again from 1935 to 1953. He contested the 1925, 1928, and 1931 elections in the Wanganui electorate for the Labour Party, but lost to Bill Veitch, the incumbent.

He was appointed to the Legislative Council by the First Labour Government, and was a member from 15 July 1940 to 14 July 1947; and 15 July 1947 to 31 December 1950.

In 1953, Rogers was awarded the Queen Elizabeth II Coronation Medal. Appointed an Officer of the Order of the British Empire in the 1954 New Year Honours, he died in 1971.

Political offices
Preceded by Hope Gibbons	Mayor of Wanganui; 1927–1931; 1935–1953	Succeeded by Norman Graham Armstrong
Preceded by Norman Graham Armstrong	Mayor of Wanganui; 1927–1931; 1935–1953	Succeeded by Edward Alan Millward
