= Douglas Cresswell =

New Zealand author, historian, and broadcaster

Douglas David Robert Cresswell (25 July 1894 – 29 November 1960) was a New Zealand writer, historian, and broadcaster.

Born in Christchurch in 1894, Cresswell was the son of Hannah (née Reese) and Walter Joseph Cresswell, a solicitor. His younger brother, Walter D'Arcy Cresswell, also known as an author in later life, was born in 1896.

Douglas Cresswell was educated at Robin Hood Bay in Port Underwood in the Marlborough Sounds, and later (1908–12) at Christ's College in Christchurch. After finishing school he travelled abroad. Cresswell later served as a lieutenant with the 1st Battalion, Canterbury Regiment, New Zealand Expeditionary Force in France during World War I, and thus was awarded the British War Medal and the Victory Medal. After the war he farmed on the plains near Ashburton for about ten years. He married artist Frances Edith "Fanny" Buss in 1932. She was born in 1910. They had four children.

From the 1930s, Cresswell became well known for his talks on radio covering topics including pioneer settlers, farming and industry, and he wrote many books, particularly about 19th century European settlement in New Zealand.

Cresswell was the Christchurch secretary of the Democratic Labour Party (DLP), formed by John A. Lee following (Lee's) expulsion from the Labour Party. At the 1943 general election, Cresswell was the DLP's candidate in the Timaru electorate, polling third behind the Labour and National candidates.

In later life he lived in Governors Bay where a road - Cresswell Avenue - is named after him. He died at Governors Bay in 1960, and Fanny died in 1986. Both Cresswells were buried at St Cuthbert's churchyard, Governors Bay.

== Publications ==
Works by Cresswell include:

- Ormond of Hawkes Bay (1947)
- Early New Zealand Families (1949)
- Eight Christchurch Schools, with illustrations by Fanny Buss (1948)
- Tales of the Canterbury High Country (1950)
- The Story of Cheviot (1951)
- Canterbury Tales (1951)
- Squatter and Settler in the Waipara County (1952)
- Early New Zealand Families: Second Series (1956)
- The Case For the South Island (1957)
