= Annette Main =

Annette Main ONZM
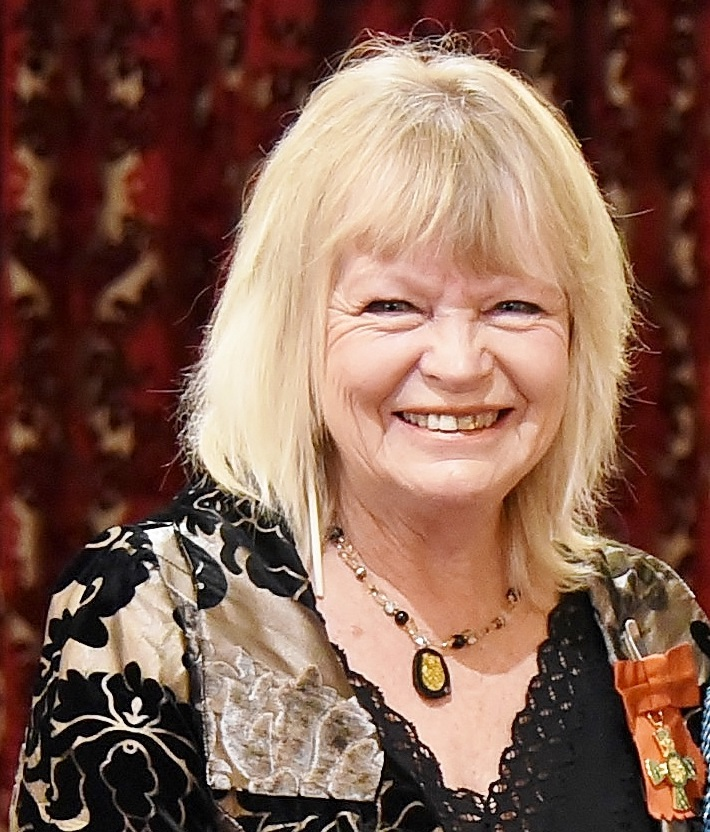
- Main in 2017

27th Mayor of Wanganui
- In office 2010–2016
- Preceded by: Michael Laws
- Succeeded by: Hamish McDouall

Personal details
- Born: Castlecliff, Whanganui, New Zealand

Annette Kay Main ONZM is a New Zealand politician who served as the 27th Mayor of Wanganui from 2010 to 2016. She has been active in the local politics of the Whanganui District and been appointed to multiple bodies.

== Early life and family ==
Annette Main was born in Castlecliff in Whanganui and attended Castlecliff School and Whanganui High School. She trained as a teacher, before becoming a parent. She worked for New Zealand Post in their public relations department, for the Whanganui District Council as a tourism officer, and then ran a tourism business.

== Political career ==
In 1998, Main was elected to the Manawatū-Whanganui Regional Council, where she served for 12 years. During that time she chaired the environment committee and served as deputy chair.

Mayor of Whanganui Michael Laws declined to seek reelection in 2010. Main was elected mayor to succeed him with a plurality of the vote and was the first woman to hold the position. She was re-elected in 2013. As mayor, she supported the New Zealand Geographic board's decision to change the town's name to include an "h". She did not stand for re-election in 2016, instead successfully pursuing a seat on the Whanganui District Health Board.

Main was appointed an Officer of the New Zealand Order of Merit, for services to local government, in the 2017 New Year Honours. The Whanganui District Council appointed Main as its representative to the Te Karewao in 2017. Minister of Education Chris Hipkins appointed Main to the council of the Universal College of Learning on 9 May 2018.
