= Colonial Motor Company =

Vehicle dealer in New Zealand

The Colonial Motor Company Limited
- Type: Public limited company
- Industry: Automotive; Automotive industry in New Zealand
- Founded: 1911
- Headquarters: 57 Courtenay Place, Wellington, New Zealand
- Number of locations: 18 (June 2018)
- Area served: New Zealand-wide
- Key people: Hope Gibbons
- Services: Automobile dealerships
- Revenue: $904 million (2017/18)
- Operating income: $25 million (2017/18)
- Net income: $25 million (2017/18)
- Website: The Colonial Motor Company Limited

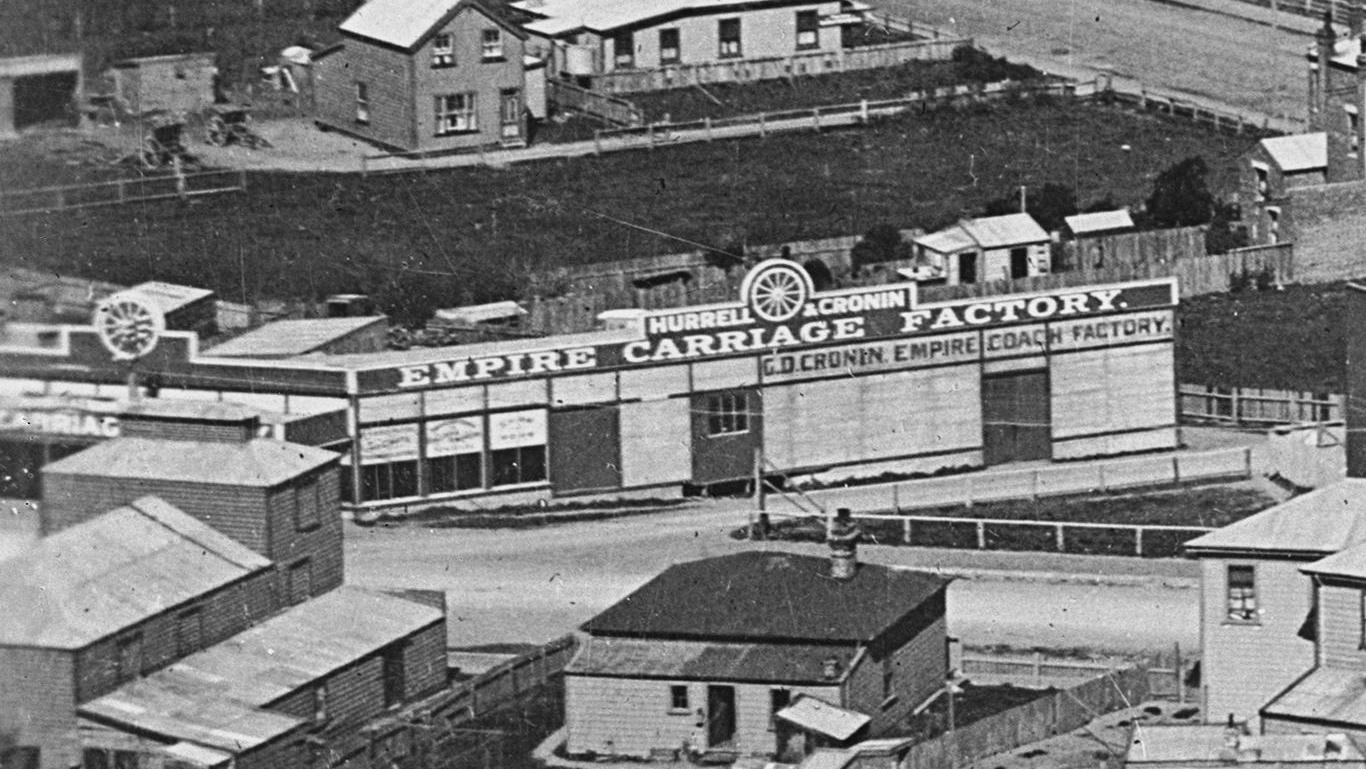
Empire Carriage Factory, Petone circa 1900

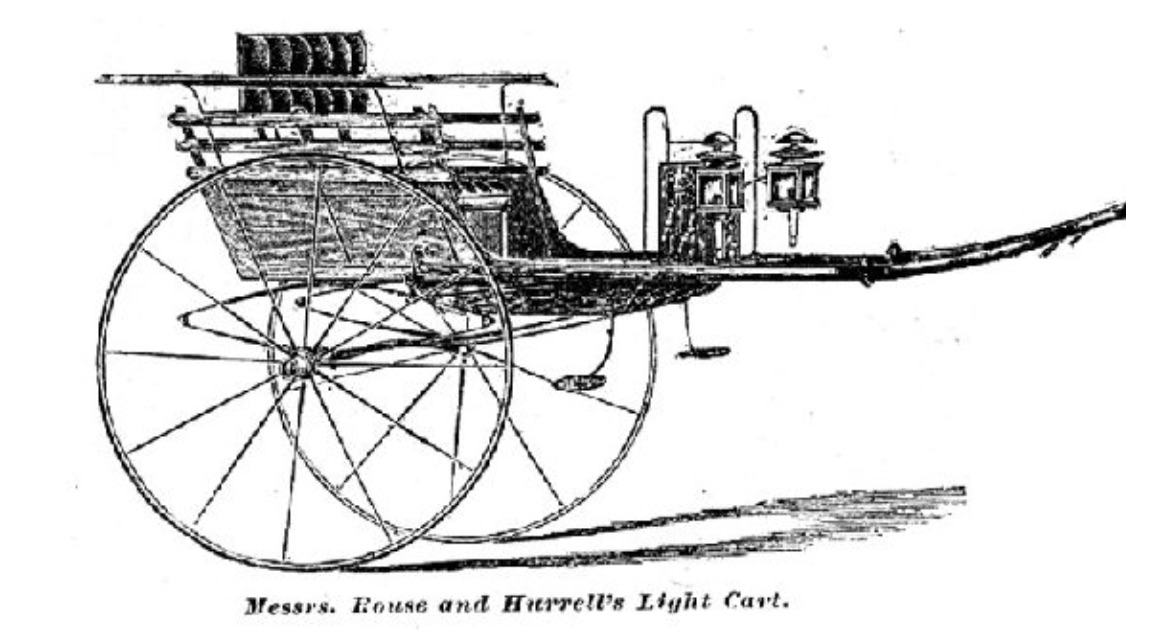
Rouse and Hurrell light cart

The Colonial Motor Company Limited is a car, motorcycle, truck and agricultural equipment dealer with 18 outlets throughout New Zealand.

From 1911 to 1936 it was Ford Canada's importer and distributor for New Zealand and assembled Ford cars from knocked down packs. It was notable for its pioneering nine-storey assembly plant which built New Zealand's Ford cars from 1922 to 1936.

== History ==
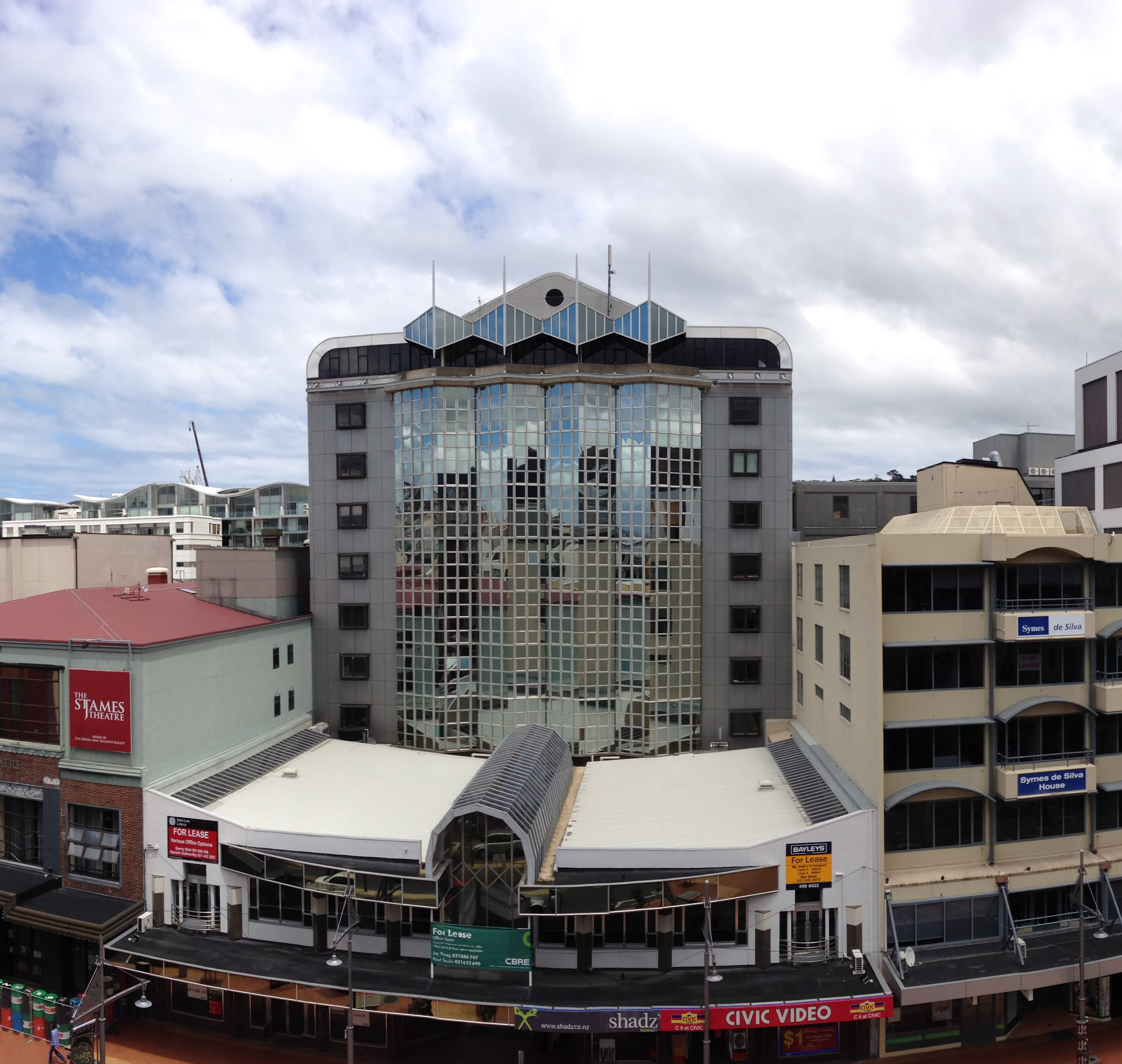
The refurbished front of the Colonial Motor Company's Courtenay Place assembly building

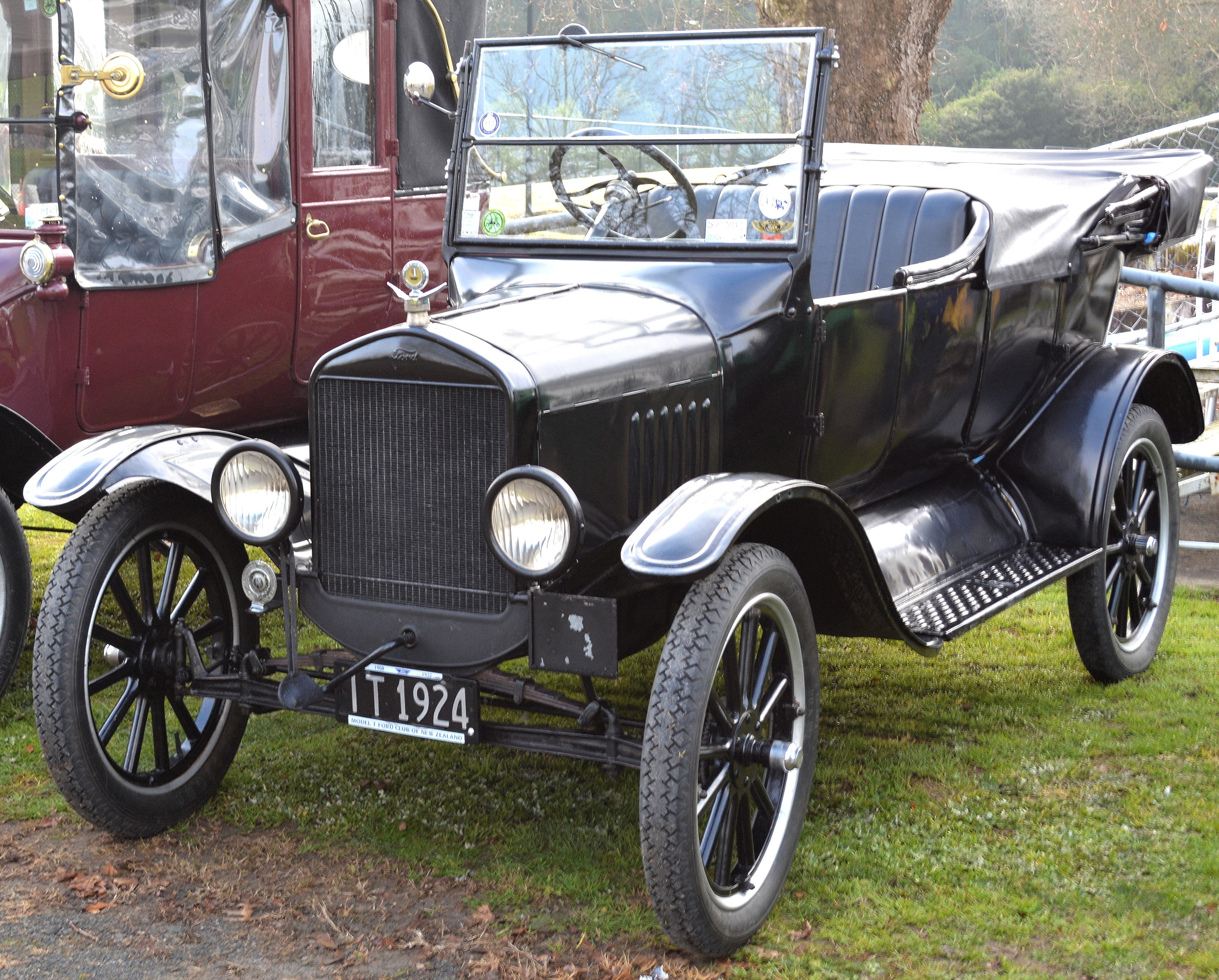
1924 Ford Model T tourer Henry Ford day Hamilton

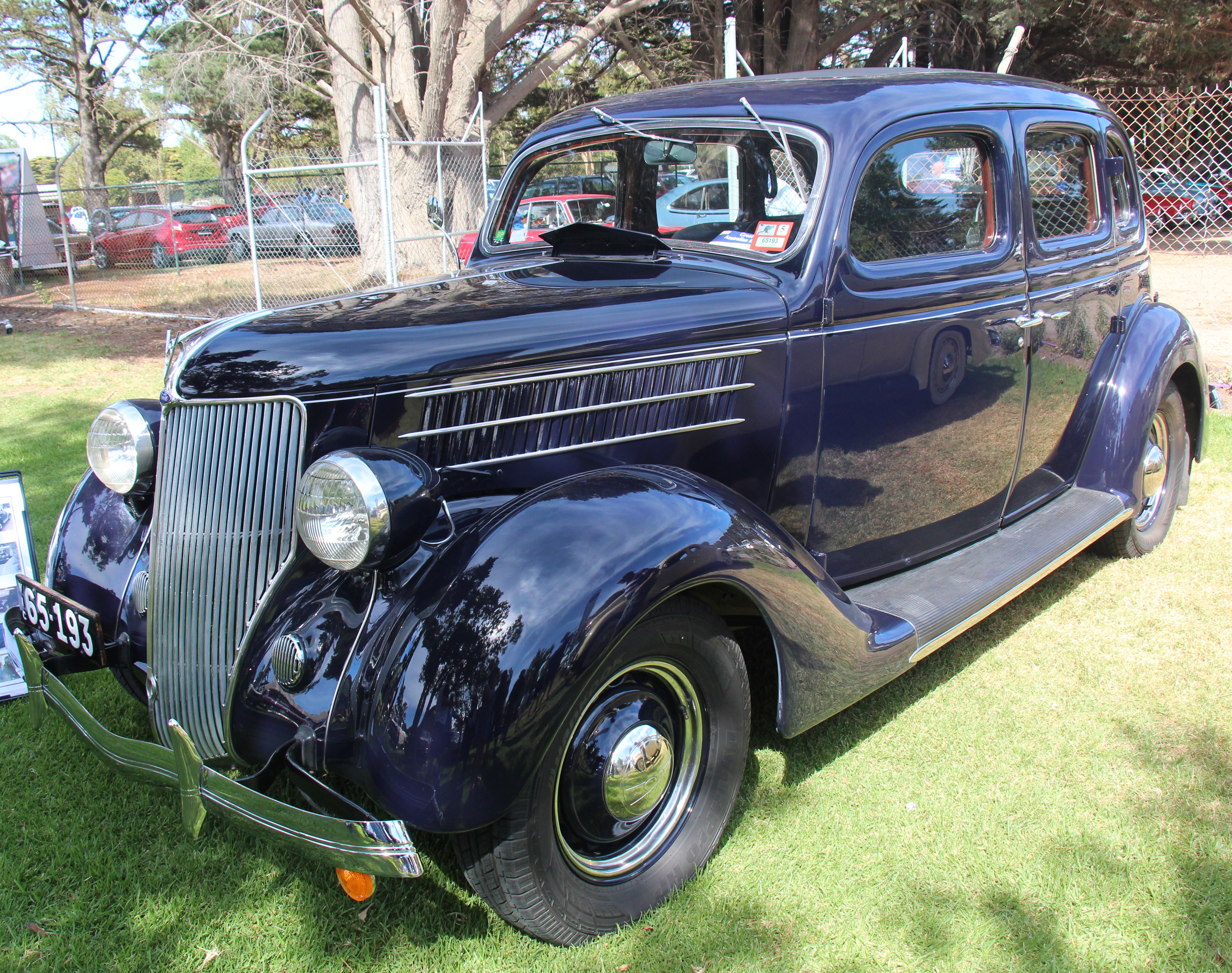
The last Ford model assembled in Courtenay Place, a 1936 V8 Model 68

The Colonial Motor Company (CMC) originated from William Black's American Coach Factory which started operations in 1859 at 89 Courtenay Place, Wellington. In 1881 Black's business became insolvent and was bought by the Empire Coach Factory, coach and carriage builders and wheelwrights of Rouse and Hurrell who expanded the business with new three storied premises calling it Rouse and Hurrell's Empire Steam and Carriage Works. In 1908 director Charles Norwood arranged a Dominion wide Ford of Canada agency. In August 1911 Rouse and Hurrell's business was transferred to a new incorporation, The Colonial Motor Company Limited. Norwood left and formed Dominion Motors.

In 1916 Hope Gibbons and his family interest acquired a shareholding, becoming majority shareholders in 1918. CMC was listed on the New Zealand Exchange in 1962, although descendants of Gibbons continue to hold a majority shareholding.

=== Assembly of knocked down vehicles ===
Construction of New Zealand's first specialised car assembly plant was begun by CMC in 1919 and completed in 1922 at 89 Courtenay Place, Wellington. It was a steel box of nine floors, based on the Ford assembly works in Ontario, Canada. The building stood over 30 metres high and was Wellington's tallest building at the time.

The top two floors were used for administration. Assembly of cars from imported packs of parts started on level 7, and finished vehicles were driven out the ground floor.

- bodybuilding with the steel stampings from Canada
- body painting
- chassis assembly, completion of engine
- upholstery
- parts bulk store
- batteries and electrical
- bulk cases and unpacking of parts to be hoisted to other floors

In addition to Courtenay Place, CMC built smaller assembly plants at Fox Street, Parnell, Auckland and Sophia Street, Timaru. At the end of 1925 assembly staff numbers were 641: Wellington 301, Parnell 188 and Timaru 152 people. At that time daily output was: 25, 20 and 18 respectively. In the 1970s Wellington's former assembly building was given a new facade inspired by a car radiator.

=== Reconditioning engines ===
In 1924 an employee demonstrated the K R Wilson Combination Machine. Within three hours he relined the crankshaft bearings, bored them to accurate size and re-bored four cylinders to a standard Ford size. The work would previously have taken 18 to 20 hours. A special assembly bench by Manley Motor Support assisted with quick and accurate re-assembly. The machinery was claimed to bring factory exactness to the local garage and ensure a full 12,000 miles of running without further attention. Other machinery for the same purpose included the Wright Multi-valve Grinder which grinds 4 valves at once, the Ames Cylinder Gauge, the Wilson Crankcase Aligning Jig and Weaver Axle Stand.

=== Assembly taken over by Ford ===
In 1936 the Ford Motor Company of Canada took over distribution and vehicle assembly establishing a new plant at Seaview near Wellington while CMC retained most of the vehicle dealerships. The new factory began to assemble cars in early 1937 and was formally opened on 7 April 1937.

== Dealerships ==
At the end of 2015 CMC reported its subsidiaries held these dealerships in these locations:

Ford
Manukau City, Botany, Pukekohe, Auckland Airport, Takanini, New Plymouth, Hawera, Waipukurau, Masterton, Lower Hutt, Wellington, Porirua, Kapiti, Nelson, Christchurch (x2), Greymouth, Rangiora, Timaru, Dunedin, Oamaru, Invercargill, Queenstown
Mazda
Manukau City, Pukekohe, Auckland Airport, Takanini, Masterton, Lower Hutt, Wellington, Porirua, Kapiti, Timaru, Dunedin, Oamaru, Invercargill, Queenstown
BMW motorcycles
Christchurch
Kenworth & DAF
Manukau City, Rotorua, Christchurch
Peugeot, Citroen, Suzuki & Isuzu
Manukau City
Nissan
Hastings
Hyundai
New Plymouth
Kia
Nelson
Honda
Pukekohe
Suzuki motorcycles
Masterton, Christchurch
Can-Am
Pukekohe
also
Tractors and agricultural equipment for Southland:
Tractors: Case IH, Kubota; Equipment: New Holland Construction, Kuhn, Norwood

== See also ==
- Automotive industry in New Zealand
