= Joan Bullock-Morrell =

New Zealand bronze sculptor (1928–2021)

Joan Bullock-Morrell (4 October 1928 – 2 January 2021) was an Aotearoa New Zealand artist based in Whanganui. She remains one of the country's most prominent bronze sculptors and in the 1960s was the only female practising in that medium. Her career spanned 45 years, and her works are on display in both private collections and public spaces.

== Career and works ==
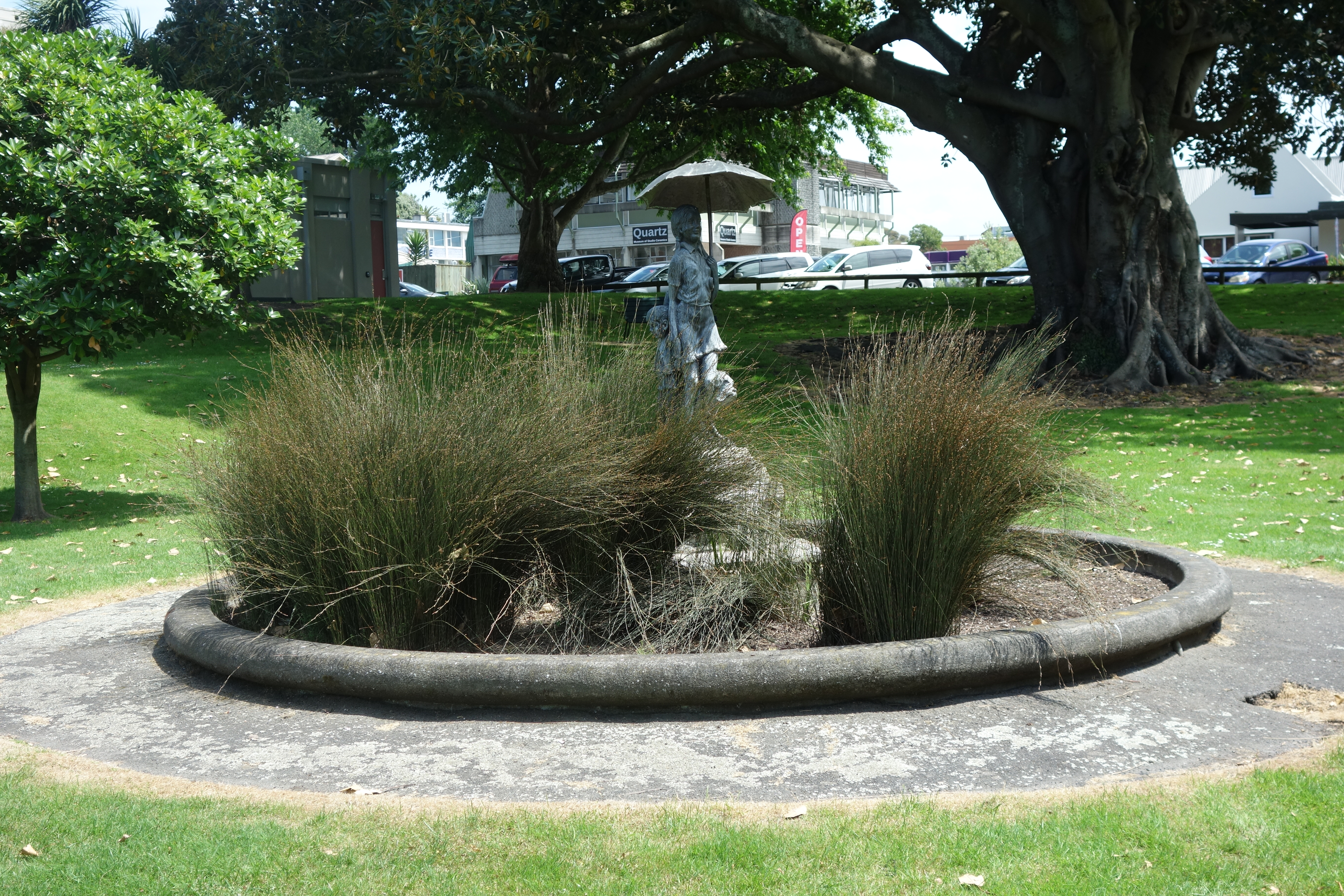
"Protection in Adversity" by Joan Bullock-Morrell, 2003. Located in Pakaitore Moutoa Gardens, Whanganui, New Zealand.

At the beginning of her career in the 1960s, Bullock-Morrell was the only female bronze sculptor in Aotearoa New Zealand. She built her own open field furnace and modified a vacuum cleaner to allow her to achieve the temperatures required to melt the bronze.

Her works were often self-expressive, but she also created sculptures of local Whanganui identities and busts of notable people such as James K Baxter (1971), Kate Sheppard (1975), and Prince Charles (1981). Some of her sculptures are on display in private collections in Europe, Asia, and Australia as well as public spaces such as Kowhai Park, Moutoa Gardens and Rotokawau Virginia Lake.

Her artwork at Pākaitore Moutoa Gardens was first made in concrete in the 1970s but damaged and then recommissioned and made in bronze in the 2000s. The work is called Protection in Adversity.

== Other media ==
In addition to being an artist and sculptor, Bullock-Morrell wrote seven poetry books, including Of Brain and Brawn, and two short story collections. Some of her poetry has been included as part of a poetry trail in central Whanganui.

== Awards and honours ==
Bullock-Morrell received the New Zealand Commemorative medal in 1990 and the Queen's Service Medal for Community Service in 1995.

== Personal life and family ==
Bullock-Morrell (also known as Joan Bullock Morrell) was born on 4 October 1928 and died at Kowhainui Home on 2 January 2021 at the age of 92. She had three children.
