= Charles Mackay (mayor) =

New Zealand politician (1875–1929)

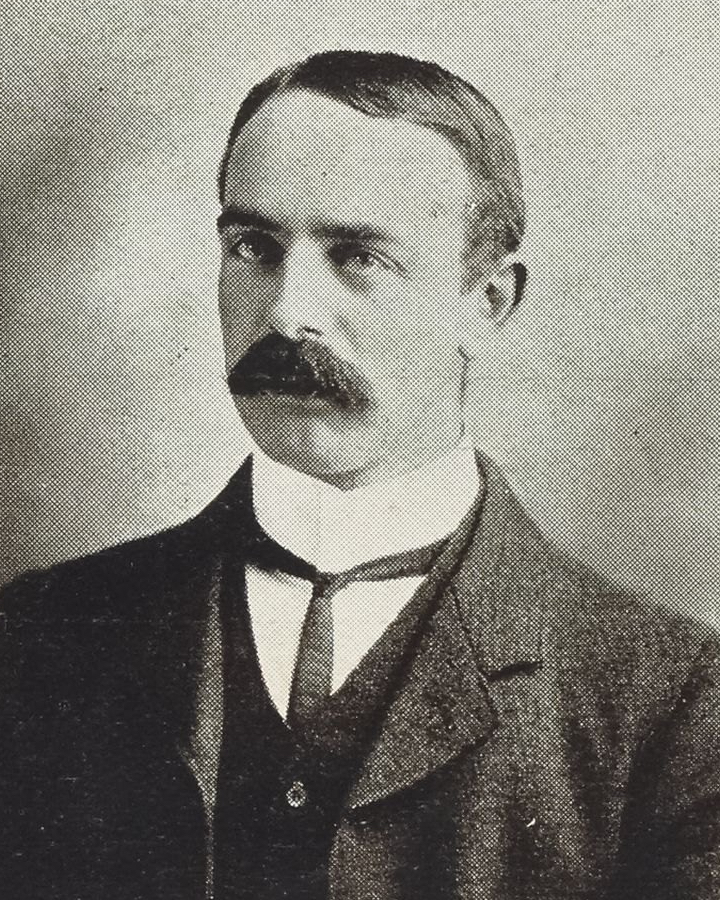
- Charles Mackay
- Born: 29 June 1875; Nelson, New Zealand
- Died: 3 May 1929 (aged 53); Berlin, Germany
- Occupation: Mayor
- Known for: Former mayor of Wanganui, later charged with attempted murder
- Spouse: Isobel Mary Agnes Duncan

Charles Ewing Mackay (29 June 1875 – 3 May 1929; later known as Charles Evan Mackay) was a New Zealand lawyer, local politician, and mayor of Wanganui. He was convicted for the attempted murder of Walter D'Arcy Cresswell in 1920.

== Early life ==
Mackay was born in Nelson, New Zealand on 29 June 1875. His parents were Jessie Wilkie and Joseph Mackay (who was the headmaster of Wellington College between 1881 and 1891).

Mackay attended Wellington College and later transferred to Canterbury College in 1890. After finishing his school education, Mackay went to university and obtained a Bachelor of Arts in 1895 and a Bachelor of Laws in 1900. He was admitted to the bar in 1901.

== Political career ==
Mackay started a law firm in Whanganui in 1902. He then joined the Mataongaonga Road Board in 1904 and the Wanganui Borough Council in November 1905. In 1906, Mackay was elected as Mayor of Wanganui, a position which he held in two separate terms (1906–1913, and 1915–1920). During his tenure as mayor, Mackay pushed for infrastructure within Whanganui such as tramways and improved roads. He also played a significant role in the 1919 establishment of the Sarjeant Gallery. He was involved in the procurement of pieces to display in the gallery and also launched a competition to determine the design of the building.

Mackay stood as an independent in the Wanganui electorate in the 1908 election, but was defeated by James Thomas Hogan and George Hutchison in the first ballot.

== Attempted murder and aftermath ==
Mackay met Walter D'Arcy Cresswell in 1920 whilst still holding the position of Mayor of Wanganui. On 15 May 1920, the pair got into an argument which ultimately resulted in Mackay shooting Cresswell. Cresswell survived the attack but sustained serious injuries due to a bullet wound in his chest.

It was alleged that Mackay made advances on Cresswell, who responded by threatening to publicly expose his homosexuality. Male homosexuality was not legal in New Zealand at the time.

Mackay plead guilty to the attempted murder of Cresswell and provided no legal defence. He was convicted to 15 years imprisonment and was subsequently sent to Mount Eden prison. He was released early in 1926 on the condition that he left New Zealand. Newspapers at the time indicated that many people found Mackay's release unfair, and speculated that he was given leniency due to his political past.

== Later life and death ==
Mackay moved to Berlin as a language teacher and part-time correspondent for The Sunday Express. In his latter function he reported on the communist street riots of May Day 1929, where he was fatally shot by a police officer who had mistaken him for a rioter. Mackay died on 3 May 1929.

== Legacy ==
Following Mackay's conviction, efforts were made by Whanganui authorities to distance themselves from him. In the 1920s, the recently named Mackay Street was renamed Jellicoe Street.

In recent times, more sympathetic views have been taken. In the 1980s, efforts were made by LGBT activists to have Mackay's name placed back into the Sarjeant Gallery foundation stone. Additionally, the site of the shooting was listed as a heritage building, with Heritage New Zealand noting it as a key indication of "the history of homosexual lives in Aotearoa/New Zealand".

In 2022, Paul Diamond wrote a book about Mackay's life called Downfall: The Destruction of Charles Mackay.

== Personal life ==
Mackay married Isobel Mary Agnes Duncan on 20 January 1904. The couple had two children. After Mackay's conviction, Duncan divorced him.
