= Moutoa Gardens =

Park in Whanganui, New Zealand

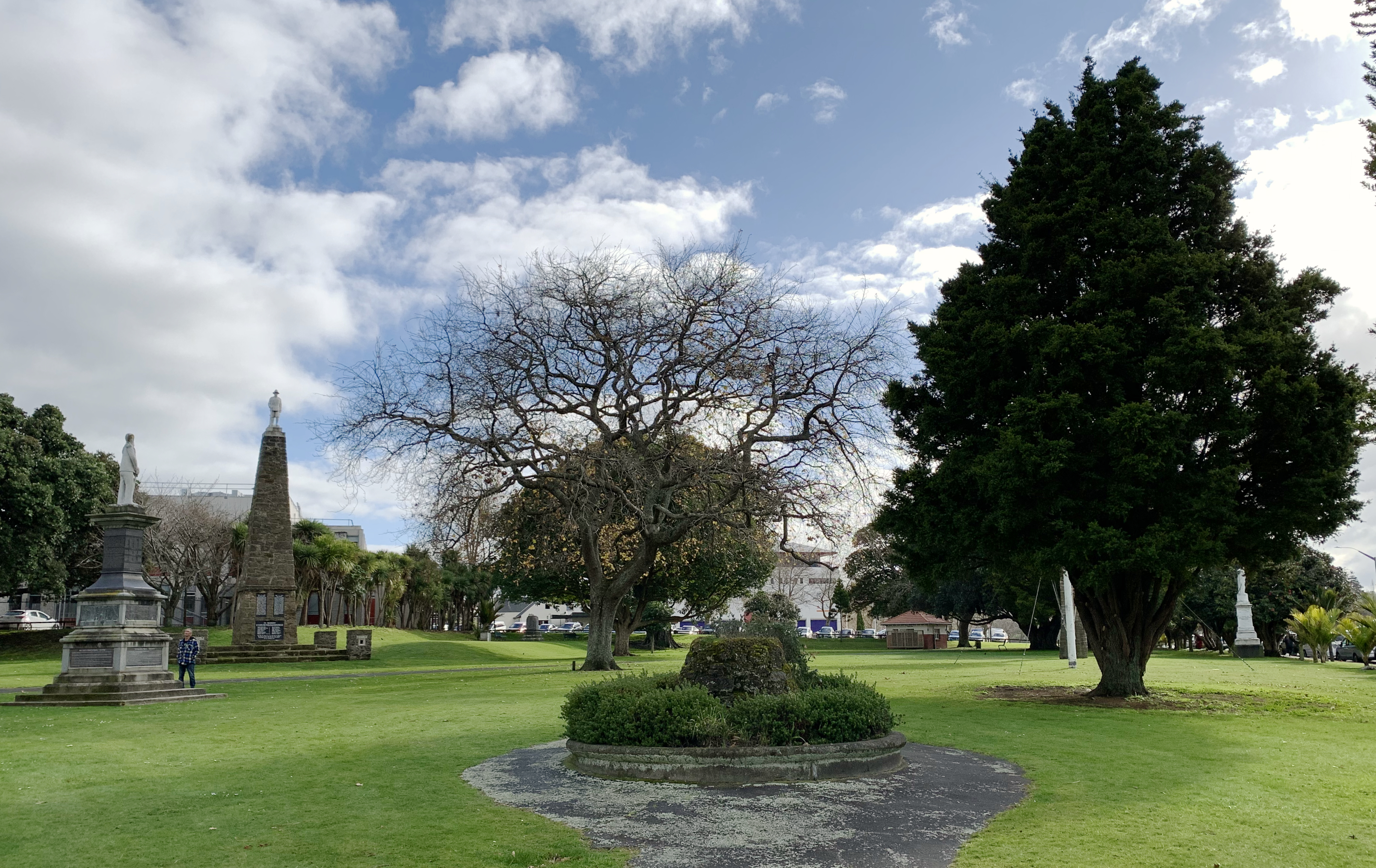
- Moutoa Gardens with (from left) the Kemp Monument, the Māori War Memorial, the First School Memorial (foreground), and the Moutoa Monument (extreme right)
- Interactive map of Moutoa Gardens
- Type: Public park
- Location: Whanganui
- Coordinates: 39.9318°S 175.0568°E
- Operator: Whanganui District Council
- Status: Open all year

Moutoa Gardens, also known as Pākaitore, is a historically significant site and park in the city of Whanganui, New Zealand. In 1995 it was the site of a protest by local Māori and a 79 day occupation which divided New Zealand public opinion.

== History ==
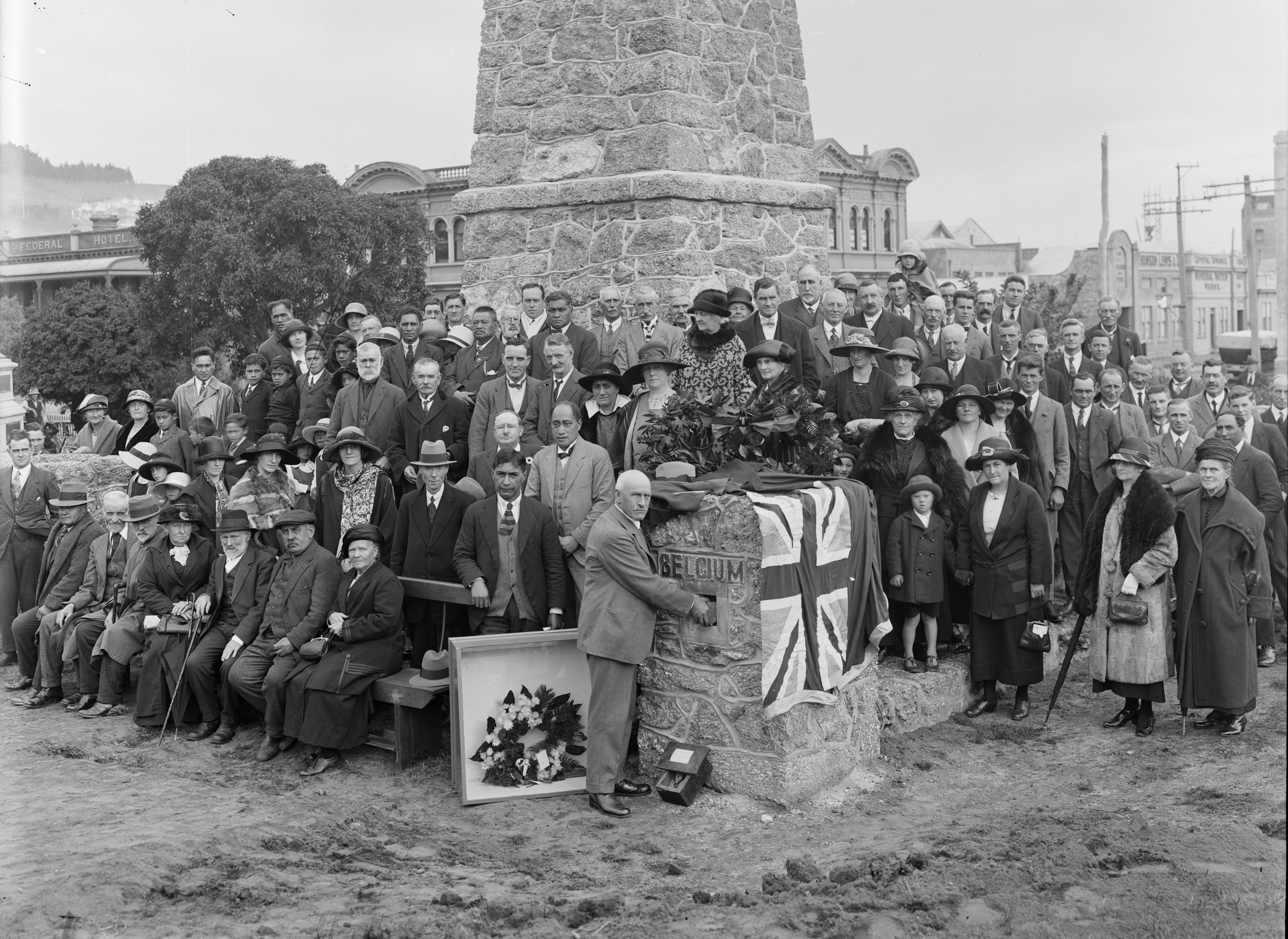
Mayor of Wanganui, Hope Gibbons, placing soil from the battlefields of Belgium in the Wanganui Maori War Memorial on Anzac Day 1925

Historically, Pākaitore was a traditional fishing settlement for hundreds of years. The site was used by Whanganui iwi and hapū in the 1800s as a trading post, and then a port used also by settlers. During some of this time the area was considered a sanctuary where all iwi were equal and the police could not enter. Between 1839 and 1848 the New Zealand Company purchased Wanganui lands on behalf of the crown from people and tribes who may have had little or no claim to it.

The gardens were given the name Moutoa after the Battle of Moutoa Island in the Second Taranaki War. They contains a memorial to the battle inscribed "To the memory of the brave men who fell at Moutoa, 14 May 1864, in defence of law and order against fanaticism and barbarism." In 2024 the monument was requested to be changed or moved with community leader Rangimarie Manuel calling it hurtful and politician Ken Mair objecting 'to his ancestors being labelled fanatics and barbarians. Especially because they were trying to protect land that was rightfully theirs.'

=== Occupation ===
The park was occupied for 79 days in 1995 in protest over a Treaty of Waitangi claim, an action which split the town and public opinion, garnered significant attention from police and regularly made national news. Local iwi claim the site was the location of a pā and trading site, left to Māori in the 1848 sale of Wanganui. Ken Mair, Tariana Turia, Henry Bennett, Niko Tangaroa and Matiu Mareikura were Māori leaders of the occupation.

== Listed heritage items ==
A number of items present in the park are registered by Heritage New Zealand.

=== Kemp Monument ===
The most prominent monument at Moutoa Gardens today honours Te Keepa Te Rangihiwinui, a Māori military commander and noted ally of the government forces during the New Zealand Wars. First known as Te Rangihiwinui and later as Major Kemp, he led the government allied Māori forces who defeated the rebel Māori at Moutoa Island. The inscription on the plinth says the monument was erected by the people of New Zealand to honour the "high-born Maori chief, brave soldier and staunch ally of the New Zealand Government". Installed in 1911, the Kemp Monument is listed as Category I.

=== Ballance Memorial ===
The Ballance Memorial commemorates John Ballance, who was the organiser of a volunteer cavalry troop and from 1891 until his death in 1893 was premier of New Zealand. The Ballance Memorial was unveiled in 1898. After the statue was beheaded twice—in 1993 and in 1994—it was removed in 1995 and only the plinth remains. A replacement statue was erected in front of the district council office in 2007. The statue was added to the country's heritage register in 1982 and the plinth remains on the register as a Category II item.

=== Māori War Memorial ===
The Māori War Memorial commemorates the participation of Māori in World War I. With an obelisk of nearly 10 metres (33 ft) in height, it is the tallest of the memorials. It was unveiled on Anzac Day in 1925. It is registered as a Category II structure.

=== Moutoa Monument ===
The Moutoa Monument (also known as the "Weeping Woman" statue) commemorates the Battle of Moutoa Island that was fought on 14 May 1864. It is registered as a Category II structure. 15 Māori and one European were killed In the battle; 6 weeks later, the Wellington Provincial Council resolved to erect a monument in recognition of the soldiers' "patriotic services". Provincial Superintendent Dr Isaac Featherstone purchased a generic sculpture of a weeping woman and installed it on 26 December 1865. The inscription reads: "To the memory of those brave men who fell at Moutoa 14 May 1864 in defence of law and order against fanaticism and barbarism."

In December 2023, after a request from the Whanganui iwi, the Pākaitore Historic Reserve Board agreed to remove the monument and relocate it where the events of the battle could be explained and put into context.

=== First School Memorial ===
A fountain was erected in Moutoa Gardens in 1900. It was later found that the fountain occupied the site of Whanganui's first school, which opened to cater for Māori children but was also attended by pākehā. The fountain is no longer operational and it was not recorded when the fountain was converted into a landscaped garden. It is registered as a Category II structure.

=== Standard chain mark ===
A standard chain mark is located in Moutoa Gardens. Following the abolition of the provincial government system, surveying was standardised in New Zealand in 1879 with a chain mark being installed in Wellington. The Whanganui chain mark was installed in the following year and may be the only unmodified chain mark that remains in New Zealand. The standard chain mark is registered as a Category I item.

=== Other sculptures ===
Other sculptures in the park include Protection in Adversity by artist Joan Bullock-Morrell first installed in 1972 and then recommission in bronze in 2003 after it was damaged during the occupation in 1995.

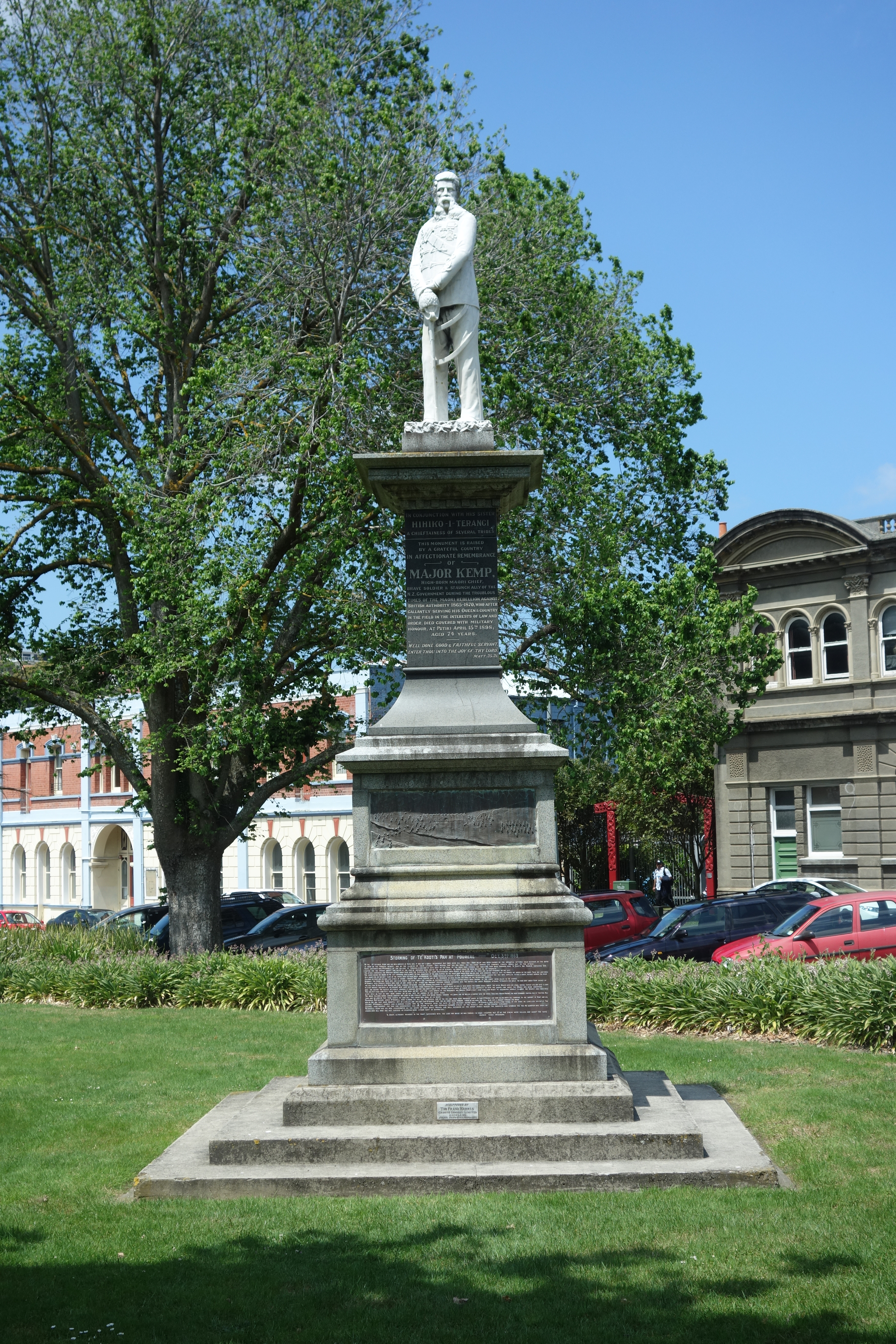
Kemp Monument

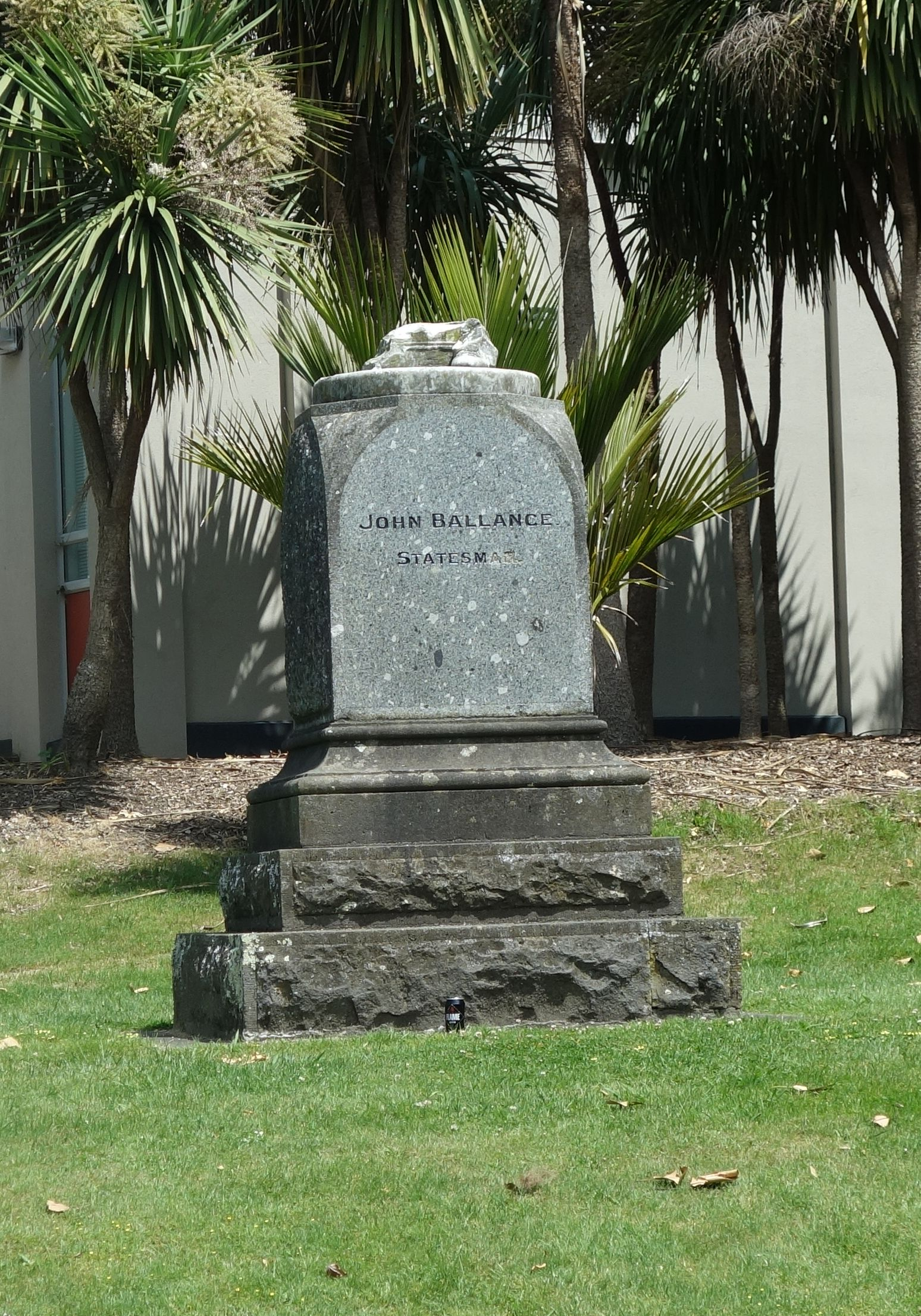
Plinth of the Ballance Memorial

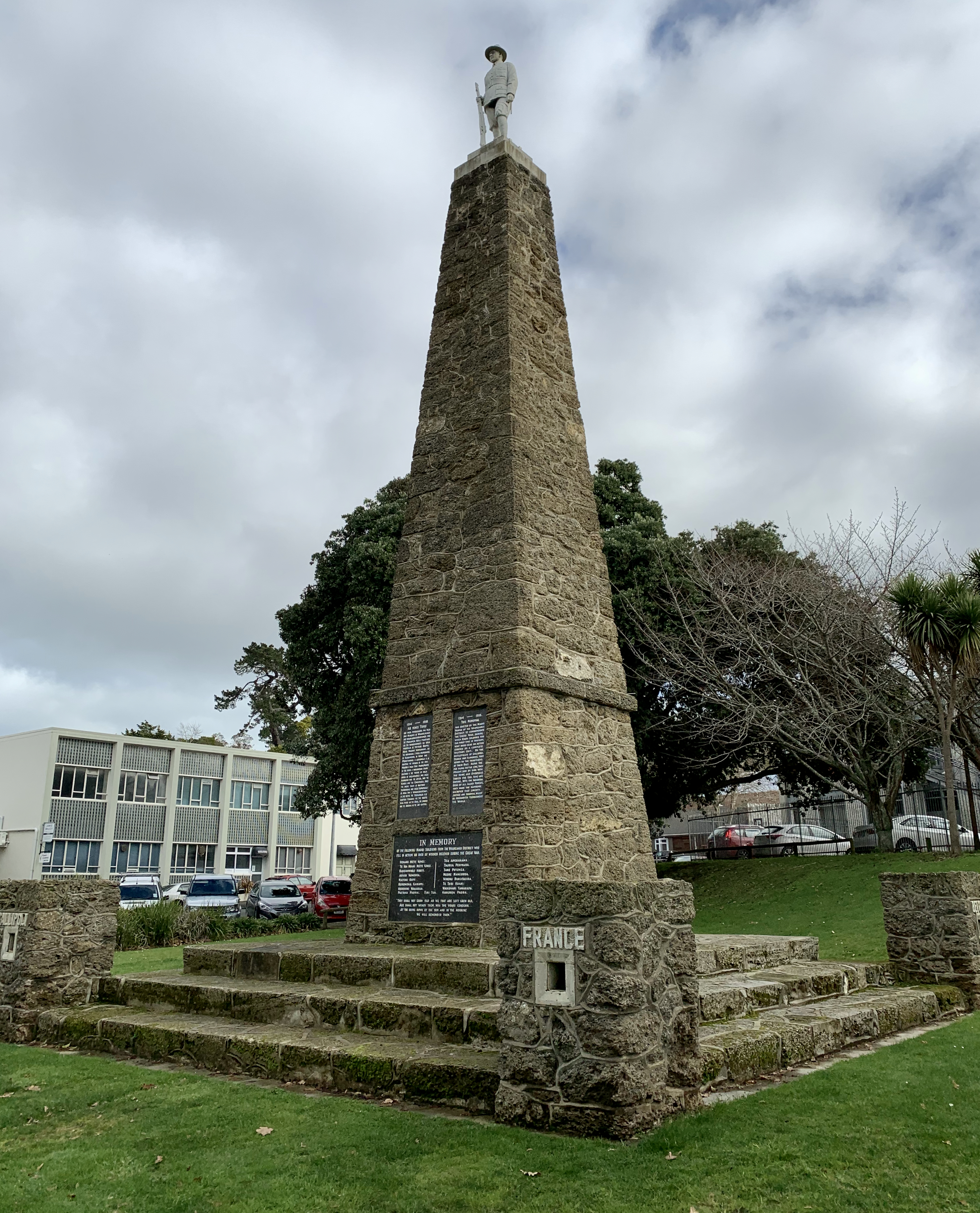
Māori War Memorial

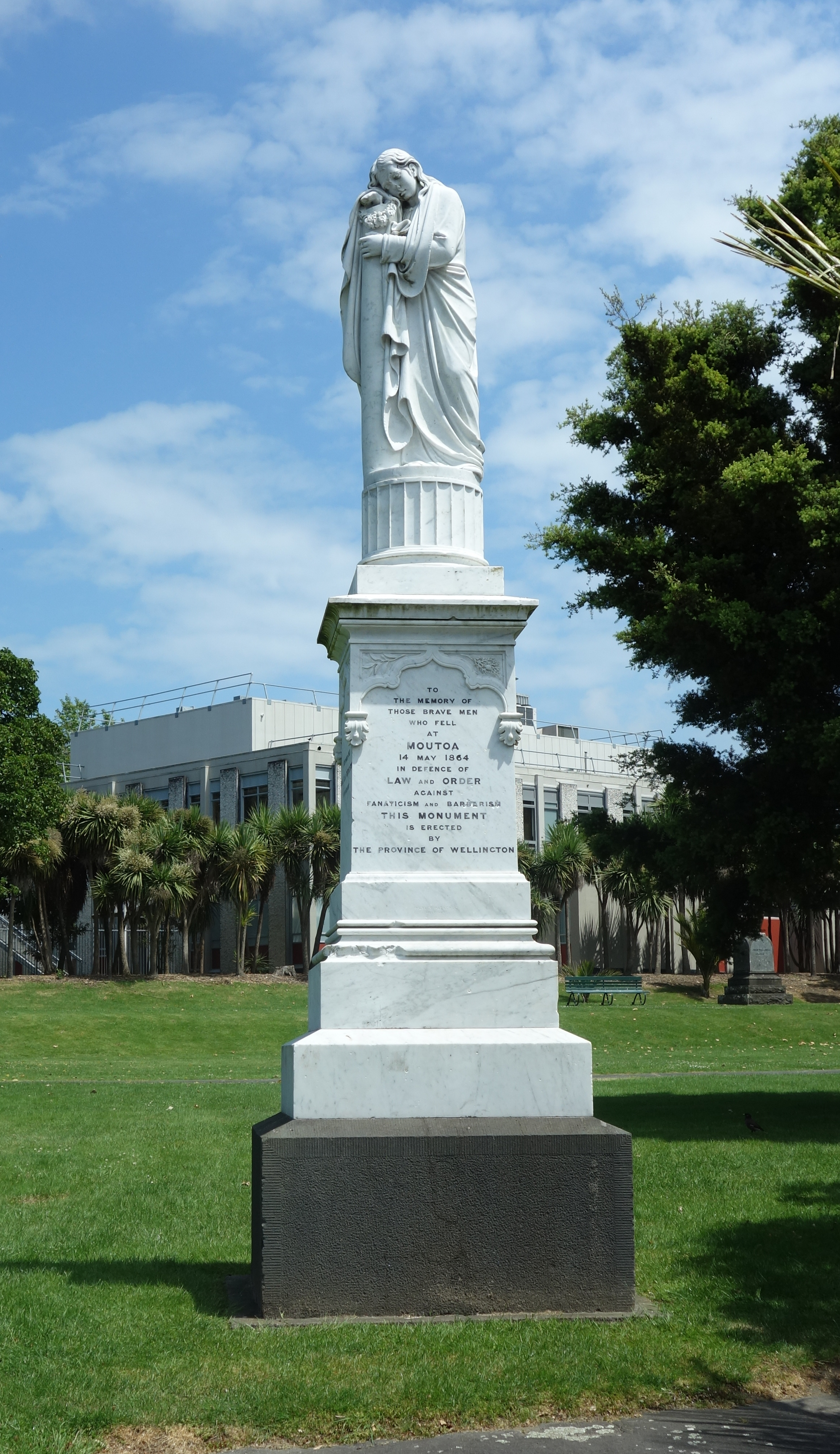
Moutoa Monument

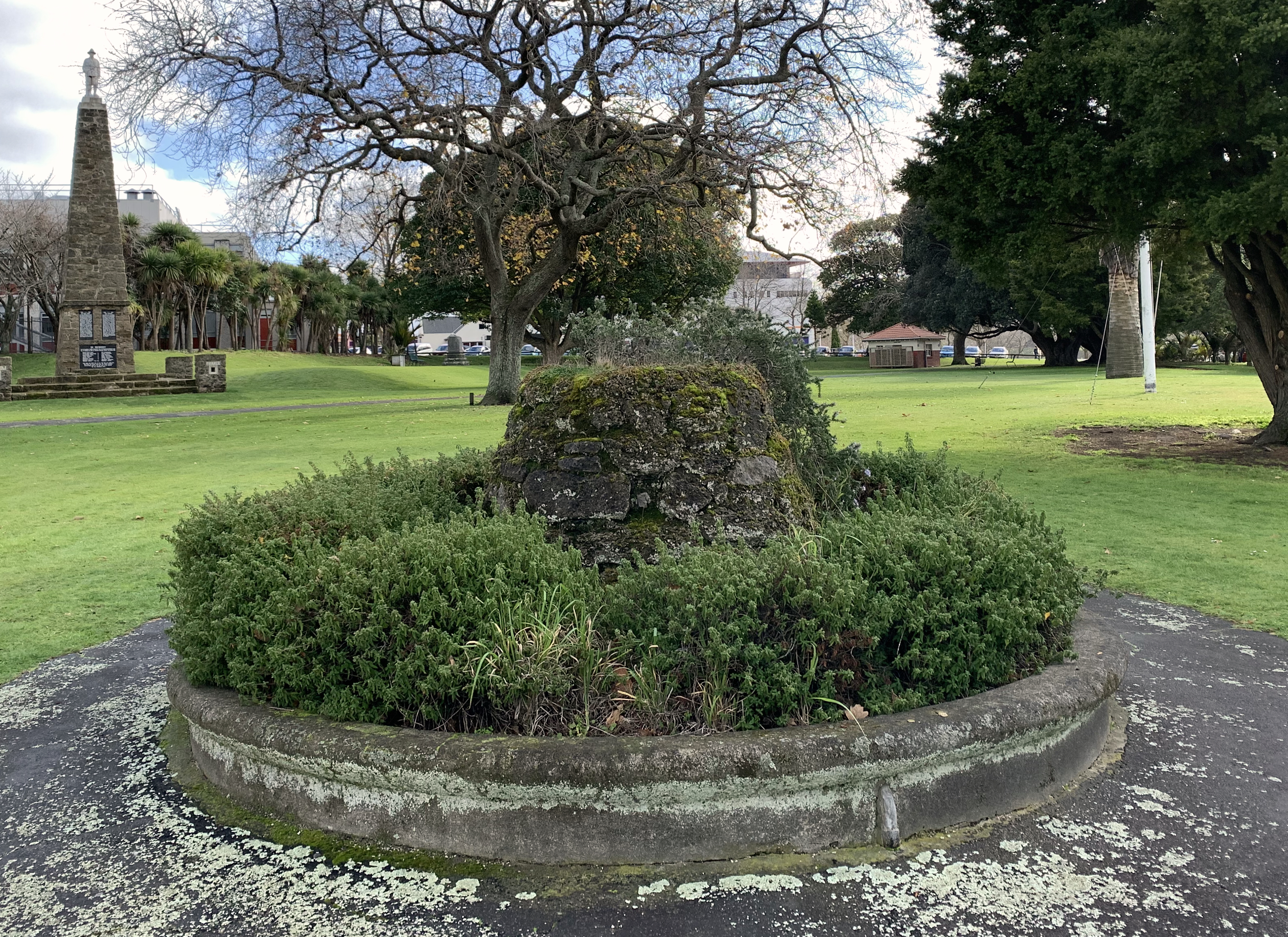
First School Memorial

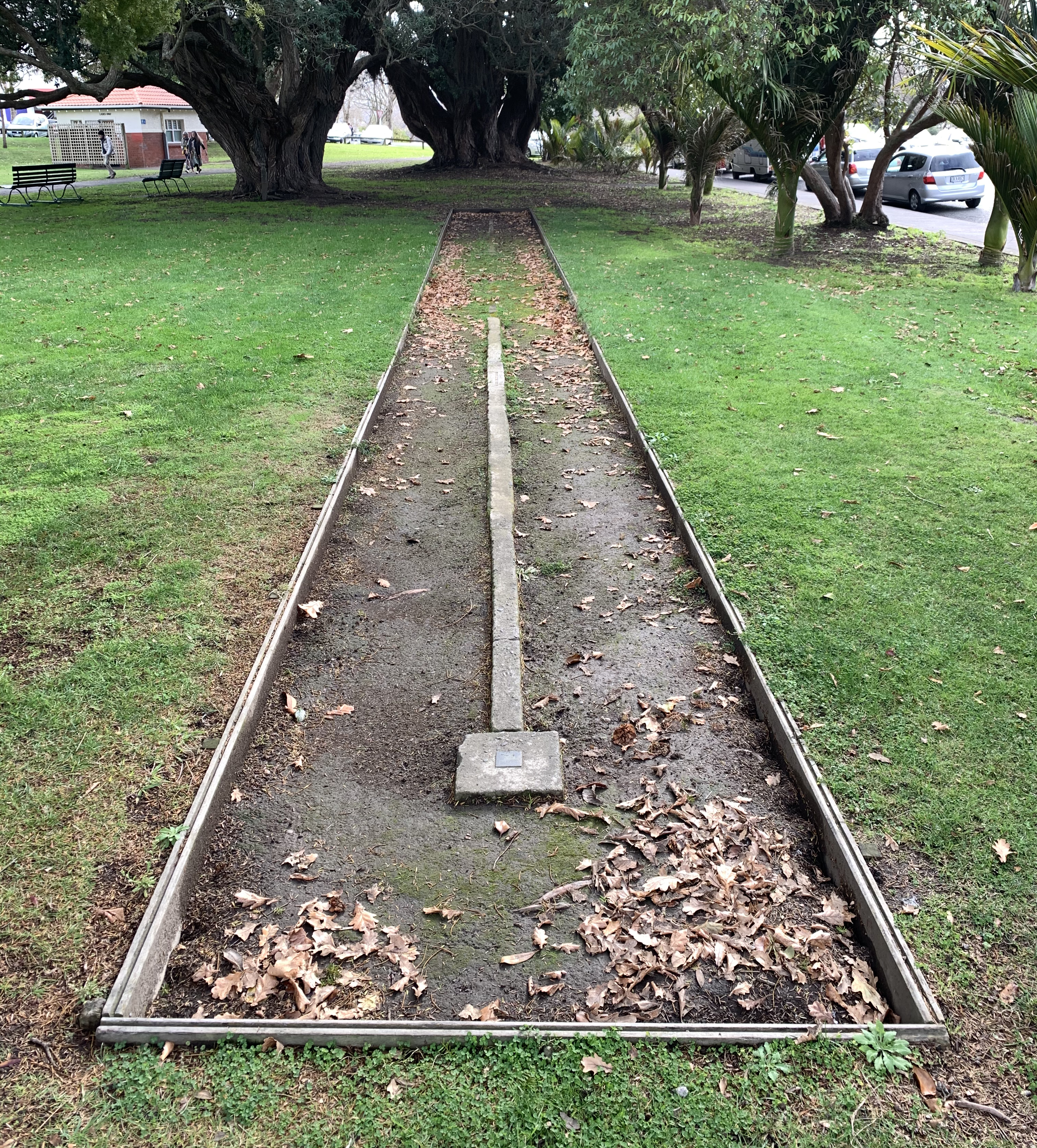
Standard chain mark
