= Arthur Bignell =

New Zealand mayor

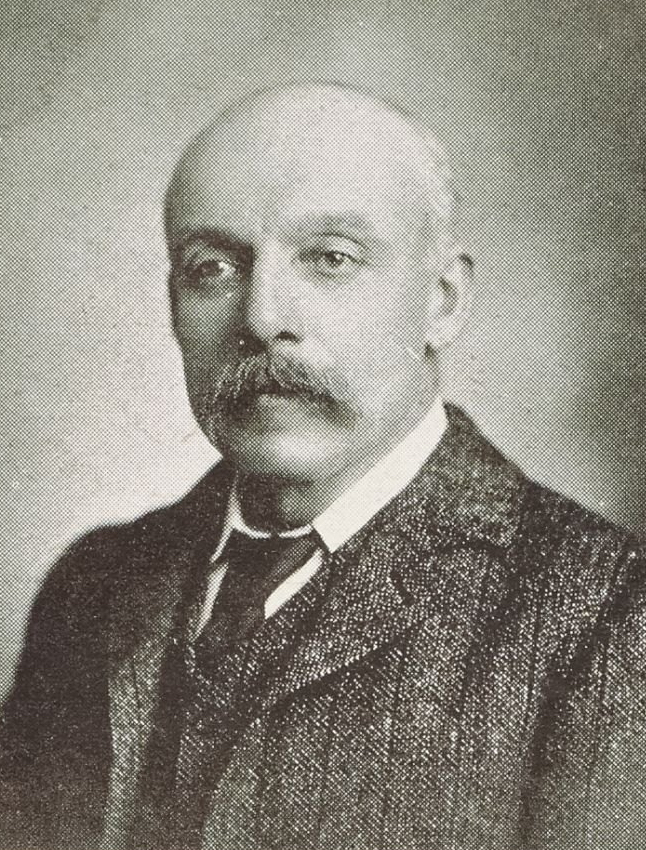
Arthur Bignell

Arthur Gorbell Bignell (1861 – 18 June 1944) was Mayor of Wanganui from 1904 to 1906, and a builder in Oamaru, the West Coast, Wanganui and the Rangitikei district.

== Biography ==
=== Early life and family ===
Bignell' was born to George Bignell and Emily Eliza Bignell (née Foy) in Ilford, London, in 1861. He was educated at Richmond, Surrey, and emigrated to New Zealand with his brother Fred in 1876, at 15 years of age.

=== Building career ===
Bignell trained as a carpenter in Dunedin and was employed by his uncle Henry in Oamaru where they worked on the original Oamaru Railway Station. He and Fred made a return trip to England in 1884 to assist the emigration of his parents and siblings to New Zealand. Upon returning the Bignell firm won the contract to construct bridges and buildings on the Midland Line.

In late 1887 the Bignells moved to Greymouth on the West Coast. In 1888 he married Florence Simpson, with whom he became father of five children: Arthur, Florence, Cecil, Winifred and Mostyn. In 1891 he entered into partnership with Robert Russell, and in 1892 Russell and Bignell Ltd. moved to Wanganui where they won the contract for the construction of Wanganui Hospital. Russell and Bignell Ltd. went on to include within their firm the business and contracts of notable local builder James Tawse upon his retirement. In 1930, he built the morgue of the Heads Road Cemetery.

=== Wanganui mayoralty ===
Bignell was elected Mayor of Wanganui in 1904, a position he held for two years until 1906. A street was named after him along the western bank of Wanganui River, just south of the town centre.

According to Wanganui's 'Familiar Faces 1907';

"The Mayoralty of A.G.B. was characterized by uniform courtesy to the crew of Councillors over whom he presided, a clear grasp of all questions affecting the welfare of the people, and an ambition to act on the square with all and sundry. His good works are many, his friends numerous, and his enemies very scarce."

=== Other affairs ===
As well as working as builder and Mayor, Bignell was involved in various other roles in the fledgling city of Wanganui. He served as Chairman of the Harbour Board, Chairman of Wanganui Collegiate School and Chairman of Gonville Town Board. He was a member of the Patriotic Association, St. Andrew Kilwinning Lodge and Wanganui Jockey club, a founding member of the local Rotary club, and also a member of a local bowling club.

In 1935, he was awarded the King George V Silver Jubilee Medal.

Bignell died in Wanganui in 1944, aged 82.

== Russell & Bignell buildings ==
Notable Russell and Bignell buildings include:

- Oamaru Railway Station
- Original Wanganui Hospital (since demolished)
- Flock House Homestead and McKelvie Flagpole
- Pukemarama Homestead
- The Grand Hotel, Wanganui
