= Philip Blakeley =

Philip William Blakeley CBE (3 April 1915 – 31 May 1994) was a New Zealand electrical engineer and engineering administrator. He was born in Lower Hutt, New Zealand, on 3 April 1915. He married Ida Rogers, the daughter of Bill Rogers.

In 1977, Blakeley was awarded the Queen Elizabeth II Silver Jubilee Medal. In the 1980 New Year Honours, he was appointed a Commander of the Order of the British Empire.
