= Mayor of Whanganui =

Political position in Whanganui, New Zealand

- Coat of arms of Whanganui

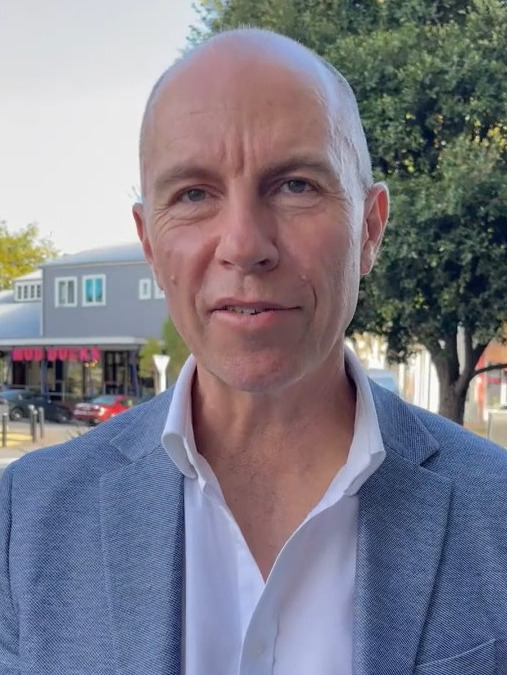
- Incumbent; Andrew Tripe since 2022
- Style: His/Her Worship
- Term length: Three years, renewable
- Inaugural holder: William Hogg Watt
- Formation: 1872; 154 years ago
- Deputy: Michael Law
- Salary: $149,641
- Website: Official website

The mayor of Whanganui (previously Wanganui) is the head of the Whanganui District Council. Since 1872, there have been 29 mayors. Andrew Tripe is the current mayor.

== History ==
The Wanganui Town Board was first formed in 1862, and its first chairman was J Handley, who served in that capacity until 1864. The board became a borough council in 1872 until 1924, when Wanganui was granted city status and the mayor was the head of the Wanganui City Council. It continued as a city council until 1989, when Wanganui's city charter was cancelled. Local government reform of 1989 amalgamated various city and council councils – Wanganui District Council includes the old Wanganui City Council, Wanganui County Council and a part of the Waitotara County Council. The motto of the then Wanganui City, and now Wanganui District Council, is 'Sans Dieu Rien' ('Without God, we are nothing').

The first meeting of the Wanganui Council was held on 14 February 1872. Councillor Francis Williamson, who was the last chairman of the town board, proposed councillor William Hogg Watt as the first mayor, which was seconded by councillor Nathan and carried unanimously. Other councillors who attended this first meeting were John Duthie, Jones and Bett. At the end of the first term, Watt was re-elected for another term. Watt resigned from the role on 12 September 1873.

Five days later, councillor William Hutchison was elected the second mayor of Wanganui. Hutchison resigned on 6 February 1874, as he had moved to Wellington to start another newspaper there. He remained in his seat as a Councillor.

Several weeks and many attempted council meetings went by without a new mayor being elected, mostly because some councillors stayed away so that there was no quorum. Finally, on 10 April 1874, Robert Pharazyn was elected as the third mayor of Wanganui.

Edward Churton retired from his mayoralty on 15 December 1875. Churton died on 25 July 1885.

Watt succeeded Churton in 1875 and started the second period of his mayoralty.

James Laird was mayor from 1886 to 1888. He died on 3 September 1902.

Alfred John Parsons was mayor for two separate periods, first from 1888 to 1890 and then in 1891–1892. Parsons died on 15 July 1900. Henry Nathan was mayor between the two periods covered by Parsons.

Edward Liffiton was mayor in 1912. In 1916, a modifying order was gazetted so that he could be buried at Heads Road Cemetery. He died in 1923.

Wanganui's most controversial mayor, by far, was well regarded lawyer Charles MacKay who was found guilty of the attempted murder of poet D'Arcy Cresswell – a charge stemming from an attempt to allegedly blackmail Mayor MacKay for homosexual advances. MacKay was arrested, pleaded guilty and imprisoned. He was released from prison in 1927, travelled to England and became a journalist. He was killed in 1929 during riots in Munich, Germany whilst reporting the civil unrest.

Edward Alan Millward OBE was mayor from 1953 to 1962. He retired in 1962. He was succeeded by Reg Andrews OBE of the Labour Party; Andrews retired in 1974. Ron Russell QSO succeeded him and retired in 1983.

The 1983 mayoralty was won by Doug Turney, with Chas Poynter coming second. Poynter was made deputy mayor in 1983 as a consequence. Poynter had served on the Wanganui council from 1977. In 1986, Poynter challenged Turney and was successful, winning with a majority of 1529 votes. In 1989, Poynter increased his majority, defeating challenger John Blaikie by almost 6,000 votes. This was the first election under the new local government boundaries, with Wanganui City incorporating Wanganui County and some of Waitotara County. Blaikie was the chairman of the Wanganui County Council prior to the reorganisation. The new territorial authority was named Wanganui District Council.

In 1992, Poynter was challenged by Wanganui greengrocer Randhir Dahya, a popular Indian businessman. His majority was cut to just 939 votes. Dahya challenged him twice more, in 1995 and 1998, but Poynter easily resisted these challenges, assisted by his handling of the Moutoa Gardens occupation of 1995 and the unfortunate death of his wife, Joy, four months prior to the 1998 election. In 2001 Poynter regained the mayoralty with just 27% of the vote, warding off four councillor challengers. In 2004, he stood again and was defeated, polling third behind media personality Michael Laws and businessman John Martin with just 20% of the vote.

Laws did not stand again in the 2010 local elections, and Annette Main was elected, to take office in October 2010. Main narrowly defeated Dot McKinnon, who had been deputy-mayor under Laws. Main was the first woman to hold the office.

== List of mayors ==
The following list shows the 29 mayors of Wanganui:

	Name	Portrait	Term
Mayor of the Borough of Wanganui
1	William Hogg Watt		1872–1873
2	William Hutchison		1873–1874
3	Robert Pharazyn		1874
4	Edward Churton		1874–1875
(1)	William Hogg Watt		1875–1878
5	Thomas Bamber		1878–1880
(1)	William Hogg Watt		1880–1881
6	Gilbert Carson		1881–1884
7	Frederick Morris Spurdle		1884–1886
8	James Laird		1886–1888
9	Alfred John Parsons		1888–1890
10	Henry Nathan		1890–1891
(9)	Alfred John Parsons		1891–1892
11	Freeman Jackson		1892–1896
12	James Lockhart Stevenson		1896–1897
13	Alexander Hatrick		1897–1904
14	Arthur Bignell		1904–1906
15	Charles Mackay		1906–1912
16	Edward Liffiton		1912
(15)	Charles Mackay		1912–1913
17	Tom Williams		1913–1915
(15)	Charles Mackay		1915–1920
(17)	Tom Williams		1920–1924
Mayor of Wanganui City
18	Hope Gibbons		1924–1927
19	Bill Rogers		1927–1931
20	Norman Graham Armstrong		1931–1935
(19)	Bill Rogers		1935–1953
21	Edward Millward		1953–1962
22	Reg Andrews		1962–1974
23	Ron Russell		1974–1983
24	Doug Turney		1983–1986
25	Chas Poynter		1986–1989
Mayor of Wanganui District
25	Chas Poynter		1989–2004
26	Michael Laws		2004–2010
Mayor of Whanganui District
27	Annette Main		2010–2016
28	Hamish McDouall		2016–2022
29	Andrew Tripe		2022–present

== List of deputy mayors ==
^{†} Died in office

Deputy mayor	Term	Mayor
Deputy mayor of the Borough of Wanganui
Arthur Bignell	February – April 1904	Hatrick
Edward Liffiton	December 1907 – c. January 1908	Mackay
Edward Liffiton	c. August 1908	Mackay
Edward Liffiton	c. October 1908	Mackay
Edward Liffiton	c. December 1908	Mackay
Edward Liffiton	c. December 1909	Mackay
Edward Liffiton	June – c. July 1910	Mackay
Edward Liffiton	December 1910 – January 1911	Mackay
Edward Liffiton	c. June 1911 – February 1912	Mackay
George Spriggens	1912	Liffiton
G. W. McCaul	1912–1913	Mackay
James Muir	1913–1914^{[†]}	Williams
Cecil Wray	1914	Williams
George Spriggens	1914–1920	Williams
George Spriggens	1914–1920	Williams Mackay
James Richardson	1920–1921	Williams
Leslie Sigley	1921	Williams
James Richardson	1921–1924	Williams
Deputy mayor of Wanganui City
Charlton Pearce	1924–1925	Gibbons
Charles William Poynter	1925	Gibbons
Cyril Palmer Brown	1925–1926	Gibbons
George Spriggens (acting)	1926	Gibbons
Cyril Palmer Brown	1926–1927	Gibbons
John Morrison	1927–1929	Rogers
George Darbyshire	1929–1931	Rogers
Fred Symes	1931–1933	Armstrong
James Siddells	1933–1935	Armstrong
John Robertson	1935–1938	Rogers
John Scott	1938–1944	Rogers
Tom Russell	1944–1946^{[†]}	Rogers
Eric Merewether	1946	Rogers
Jim Broad	1946–1947	Rogers
Roy Jack	1947–1955	Rogers
Roy Jack	1947–1955	Millward
Unknown	1955–c. 1957	Millward
Eugene Crotty	fl.1957–1959	Millward
Unknown	1959–c. 1960	Millward
Ron Russell	fl.1960–1962	Millward
M. S. S. Smith	1962–?	Millward
Unknown	c. 1962–c. 1968	–
A. M. Brown	fl.1968	
B. H. Jones	fl.1969	Andrews
Unknown	c. 1969–c. 1981	–
Paul Mitchell	fl.1981	Russell
Unknown	c. 1981–1983	Russell
Chas Poynter	1983–1986	Turney
Unknown	1986–1989	Poynter
Deputy mayor of Wanganui District
Unknown	1989–1992	Poynter
Lysbeth Noble	1992–1995	Poynter
Unknown	1995–c. 1998	Poynter
Pam Erni	fl.1998–2001	Poynter
Randhir Dahya	2001–2004	Poynter
Dot McKinnon	2004–2010	Laws
Deputy mayor of Whanganui District
Rangi Willis	2010–2013	Main
Hamish McDouall	2013–2016	Main
Jenny Duncan	2016–2022	McDouall
Helen Craig	2022–2025	Tripe
Michael Law	2025–present	Tripe

== See also ==
- Mayor of Palmerston North
- Mayor of Rangitikei
