= D'Arcy Cresswell =

New Zealand poet, journalist and writer (1896–1960)

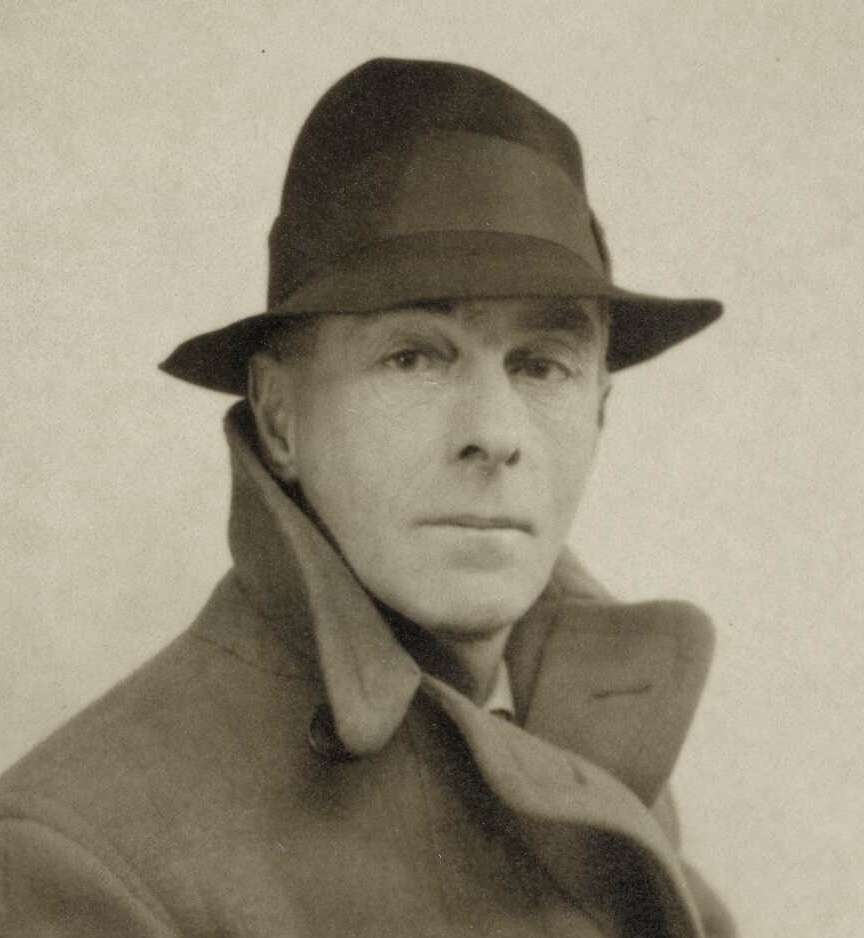
- Cresswell in 1948
- Born: Walter D'Arcy Cresswell; 22 January 1896; Christchurch, New Zealand
- Died: 21 February 1960 (aged 64); St John's Wood, London, United Kingdom
- Occupations: Poet, writer, journalist
- Spouse: Emily Freda Dacie (m. 1925, divorced)
- Children: 1
- Military career
- Allegiance: United Kingdom; New Zealand
- Branch: British Army; New Zealand Expeditionary Force
- Service years: 1914–1919
- Rank: Private
- Units: Middlesex Regiment; Corps of Royal New Zealand Engineers
- Battles: World War I; Western Front

Walter D'Arcy Cresswell (22 January 1896 – 21 February 1960) was a New Zealand poet, journalist and writer.

== Life and career ==
Cresswell was born in Christchurch, New Zealand, to Hannah (née Reese) and Walter Joseph Cresswell, a solicitor. His elder brother was Douglas Cresswell, later known as a writer. On leaving school (Christ's College, 1910–1912) D'Arcy joined the Christchurch architectural firm of Collins and Harman.

In mid-1914 Cresswell went to London to undertake further studies at the Architectural Association, and in early 1915 enlisted as a private in the British Army and joined the Middlesex Regiment. Cresswell was wounded in France in 1916, and after convalescence joined the Corps of New Zealand Engineers, serving from 1917 until he was demobilized in 1919.

Cresswell famously blackmailed the mayor of Wanganui, Charles Mackay, by threatening to expose his homosexuality. Shortly after their first meeting, Mackay shot and injured Cresswell. Mackay was convicted of attempted murder in 1920.

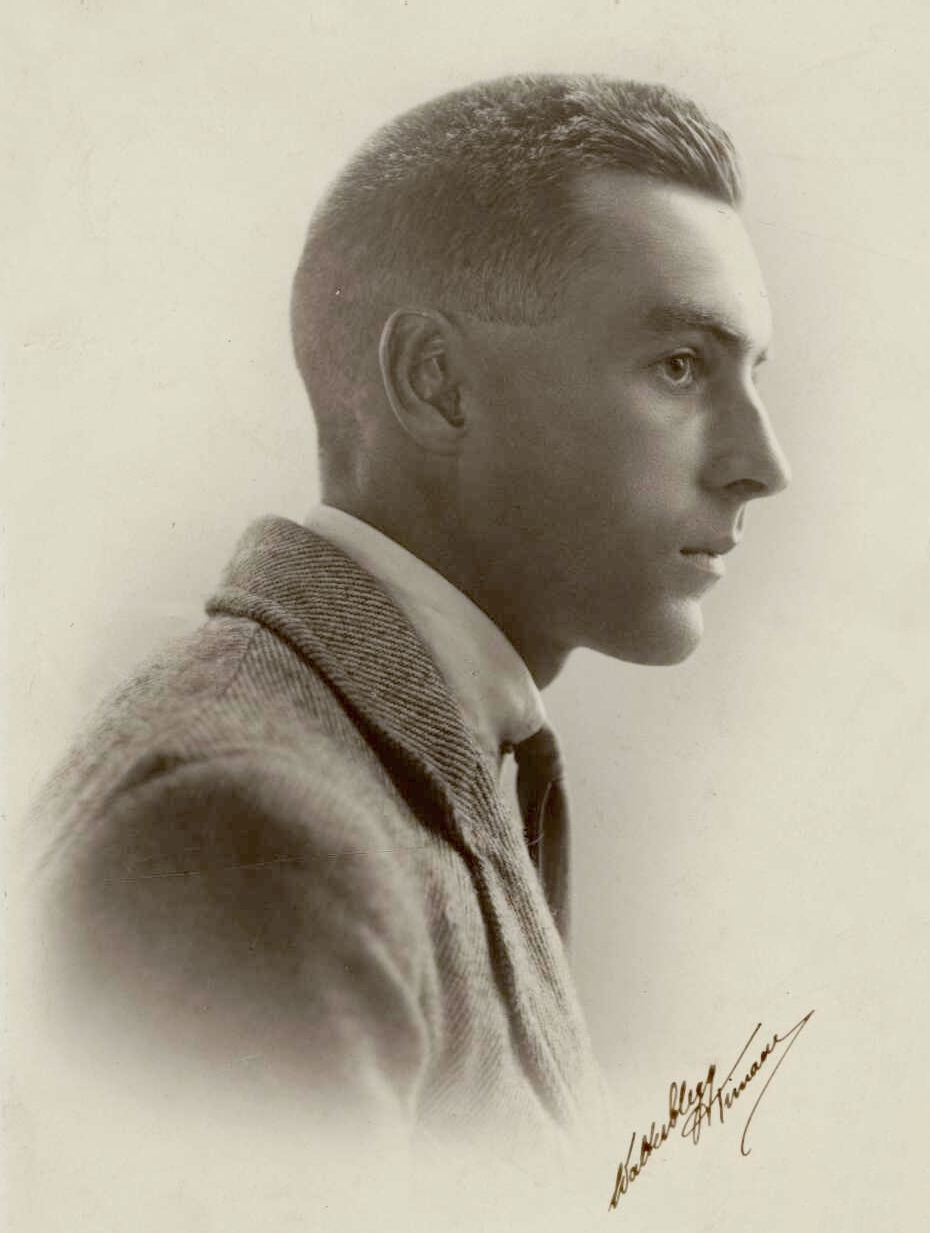
Cresswell in 1921

In 1921, Cresswell returned to London, where he spent most of the rest of his life, although he retained his New Zealand links and made several trips back home. In London he eked out a precarious existence while writing and died there in 1960. Volumes of his poems were published over the years, some in New Zealand.

In August 1925 Cresswell married Emily Freda Dacie (the "Freda" of several of his poems) in the Marylebone Register Office in London. The marriage was short-lived, although a son was born early the following year.

Of Cresswell, John Newton has said, "He is not remotely the poet he believed himself to be, and, judged on his verse alone, would long have been forgotten," but he added: "He remains, however, one of New Zealand literature's outstanding identities." The critic Bart Sutherland, writing in 1931 in The New Zealand Herald, said of Cresswell's autobiographical book The Poet's Progress (1930): "to the initiate, [it] is surely the most beautiful creation in our literature, though it would probably be labelled by the man in the street as the work of a harmless lunatic". Of his second volume of autobiography, Present Without Leave (1939), the reviewer for the Auckland Star said "the book is a notable one, and has some of the essentials of real greatness", and concluded: "Despite its many demerits (and they, like the numerous spelling mistakes, are a part of the author), it may be accounted good by the present generation, and perhaps great by a later one."

Some of his letters were published as The Letters of D'Arcy Cresswell in 1971 by the University of Canterbury.

Cresswell died suddenly at his home in St John's Wood, London, in February 1960, aged 64.

== Books ==
- Poems, 1921–1927 (1928)
- The Poet's Progress (1930)
- Poems, 1924–1931 (1932)
- Modern Poetry and the Ideal (1934)
- Eena Deena Dynamo (1936)
- Lyttelton Harbour: A Poem (1936)
- Present Without Leave (1939)
- Twelve Poems (1947)
- The Forest (1952)
- The Letters of D'Arcy Cresswell (1971)
- Dear Lady Ginger: An Exchange of Letters between Lady Ottoline Morrell and D'Arcy Cresswell (1984)
