= Hamish McDouall =

New Zealand politician

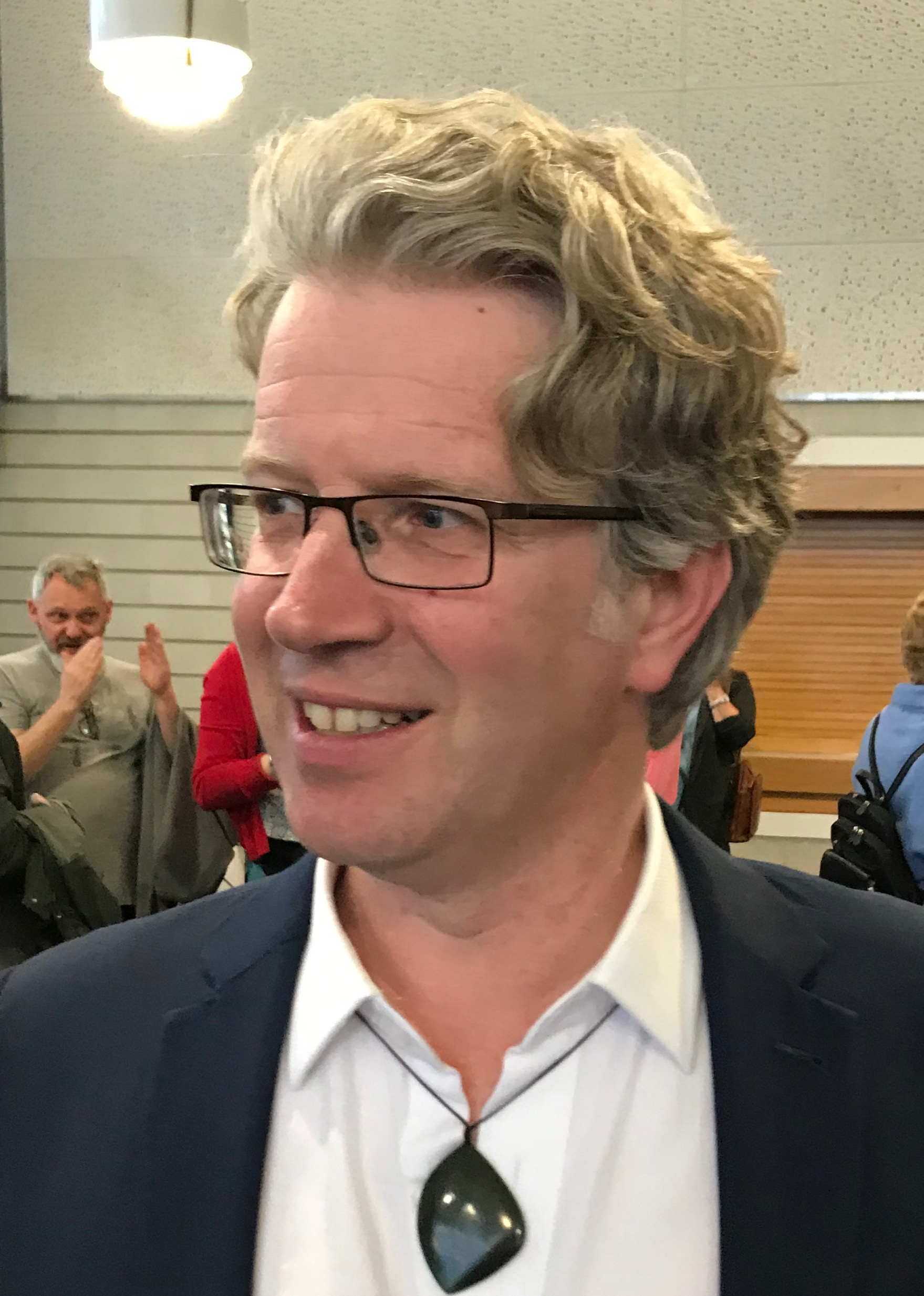

28th Mayor of Whanganui
- In office October 2016 – 2022
- Preceded by: Annette Main
- Succeeded by: Andrew Tripe

Deputy Mayor of Whanganui
- In office 2013–2016
- Preceded by: Rangi Willis
- Succeeded by: Jenny Duncan

Personal details
- Born: 1968 or 1969 (age 57–58) Wanganui, New Zealand
- Party: Labour
- Spouse: Elinor
- Relations: Jacinda Ardern (second cousin)
- Children: 2

Hamish McDouall is a New Zealand local government politician and a former mayor of Whanganui. He is a member of the New Zealand Labour Party.

== Biography ==
=== Early life and career ===
McDouall was born in Wanganui to Shirley (née Sanson) and Gerald McDouall and attended Wanganui Collegiate School. He studied law and arts at the University of Otago. McDouall was a winner on the gameshow Sale of the Century and was the champion of TVNZ's Mastermind programme in 1990, collectively winning nearly $100,000 worth in prizes. His winning specialist subject was The Life & Works of David Bowie. He played both soccer, cricket and represented Whanganui in roller hockey.

He then lived abroad in England, Sweden and Russia before returning to Wanganui in 2001. He then took up work as a barrister and solicitor and worked in corporate, family, and community law. He is the author of four published books.

=== Political career ===
McDouall joined the Labour Party in 2007 and was Labour's candidate for the Whanganui electorate in 2008, 2011 and 2014, but lost to incumbent Chester Borrows.

At the 2010 local body elections he was elected a member of the Whanganui District Council. After serving one term as deputy mayor to Annette Main, McDouall succeeded the Whanganui mayoralty in the 2016 local government elections. After winning the 2016 election with 39.18% of the popular vote and 2,900 more votes than that of his nearest rival, McDouall was returned to the mayoralty in 2019 unopposed. He lost the 2022 mayoral to first time candidate Andrew Tripe.

== Personal life ==
He has a wife, Elinor, and two children. He is a second cousin of former Prime Minister Jacinda Ardern.

Political offices
Preceded by Annette Main	Mayor of Whanganui; 2016–2022	Succeeded by Andrew Tripe
