= Paul Diamond (writer) =

New Zealand curator, journalist, historian

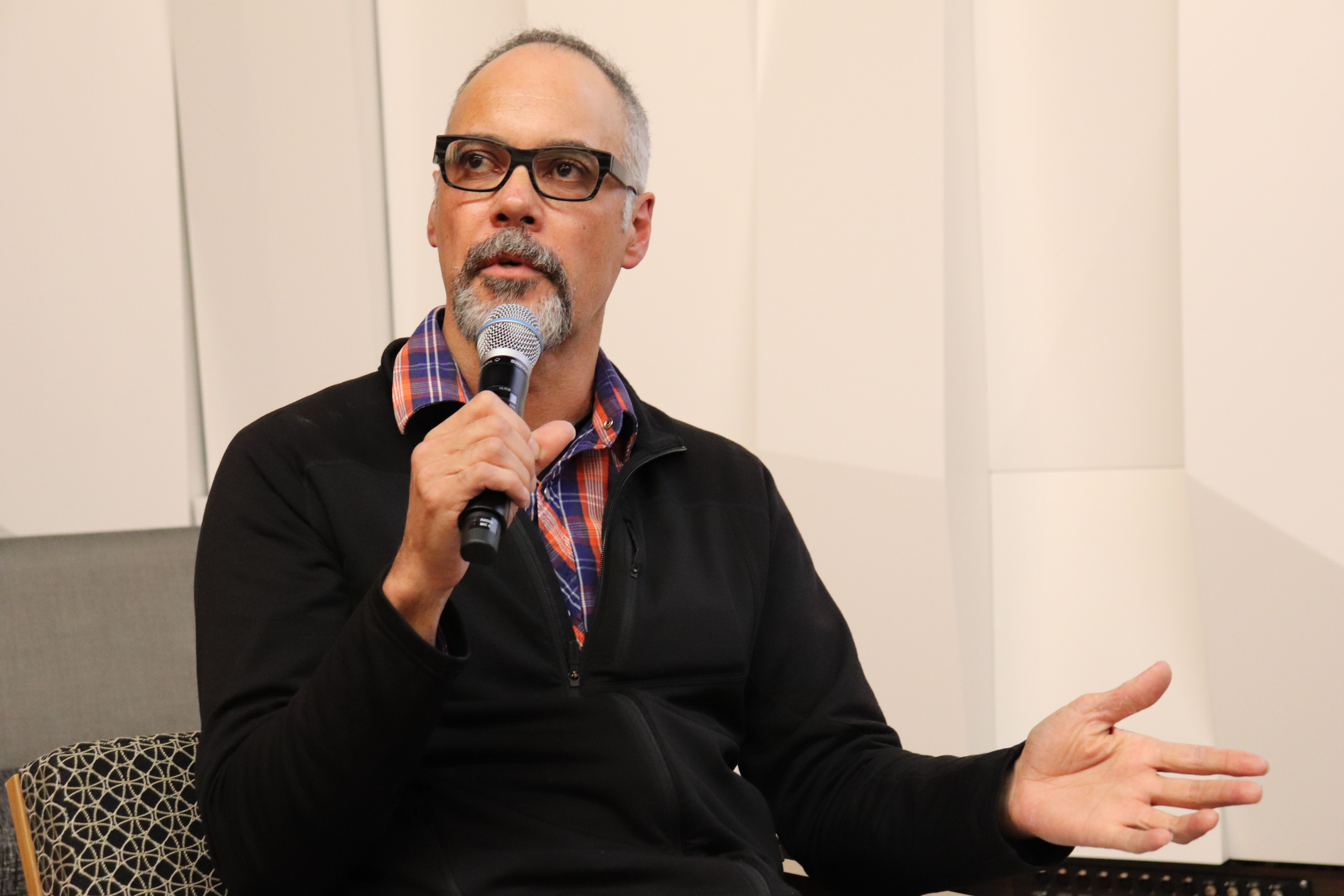
Paul Diamond at ComicFest in 2019

Paul Diamond (born 1968) is a New Zealand writer, curator, journalist, broadcaster and historian. He grew up in the Hutt Valley and is of Ngāti Hauā, Te Rarawa and Ngāpuhi descent. After a degree from Massey University he became a journalist. From 2011 he was the inaugural Curator, Maori at the Alexander Turnbull Library. He later became Head of New Zealand and Pacific Histories and Cultures at Te Papa Tongarewa.

In 2022, Diamond wrote a book about the life of Charles Mackay called Downfall: The Destruction of Charles Mackay. The book was shortlisted for Ockham New Zealand Book Awards General Non-Fiction Award in 2023.

He was also the author of A Fire in Your Belly: Māori leaders speak (Huia, 2003), Makereti: Taking Māori to the world (Random House, 2007), a biography of Makereti (often known as Guide Maggie or Maggie Papakura) and Savaged to Suit: Māori and cartooning in New Zealand (Fraser Books, 2018). In 2017 he was awarded Creative New Zealand’s prestigious Berlin Writer’s Residency. As a journalist and broadcaster he was awarded Qantas Media Awards, Media Peace Awards and a David Low Chevening Fellowship to Oxford University. Paul Diamond's book, A Fire in Your Belly: Māori leaders speak, published in 2003, was listed in Books of Mana as one of the 180 most significant works of Māori-authored non-fiction.
