= Fanny Buss =

New Zealand textile artist (1910–1986)

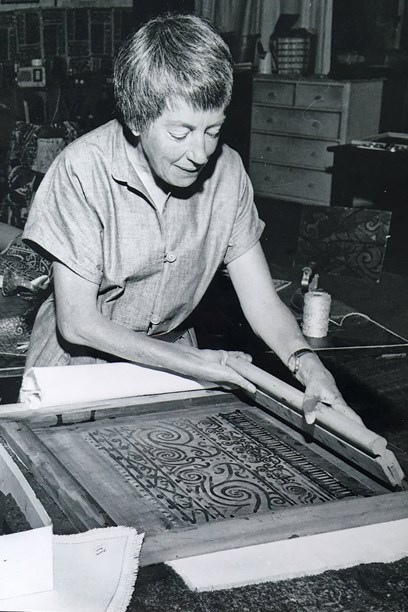
- Fanny Buss screenprinting in 1964
- Born: Frances Edith Buss; 23 March 1910; Christchurch, New Zealand
- Died: 5 June 1986 (aged 76)
- Education: Canterbury College School of Art
- Known for: Fashion design, writer, printmaking and business entrepreneur
- Spouse: Douglas Cresswell (m. 1932; died 1960)

Frances Edith Cresswell (née Buss, 23 March 1910 – 5 June 1986), commonly known as Fanny Buss, was a textile and fashion designer from New Zealand active from the 1950s to the 1980s. Buss was also a printmaker, writer and book illustrator. Examples of her fashion designs are held in the collections of museums around New Zealand including in the Auckland War Memorial Museum, Museum of New Zealand Te Papa Tongarewa, Otago Museum, MTG Hawke's Bay and also feature in the New Zealand Fashion Museum. Buss was a working member of the Canterbury Society of the Arts.

== Early life and family ==
Buss was born in Christchurch on 23 March 1910, the daughter of George Howard Buss and Frances Ethel Buss (née Pilbrow) who were farming at Scargill in North Canterbury. As a child she boarded in Christchurch and Timaru before studying at the Canterbury College School of Art. In 1929 she lived in a "cheap bedsit" with Rita Angus and Jessie Lloyd.

In 1932, Buss married Douglas Cresswell, and the couple went on to have four children.

== Career ==
Buss started printing fabric in the 1950s. She began with potato blocks then moved on to wood blocks and later screen printing. She started by selling table mats, curtains and beach shirts, which provided an income for her family. Buss labelled her garments with her maiden name. In the 1970s her dresses and coats were worn by New Zealand's first Māori woman cabinet minister, Whetu Tirikatene-Sullivan.

== Death ==
Buss died on 5 June 1986. She had been predeceased by her husband in 1960.

== Bibliography ==
- Eight Christchurch schools. Cresswell, Douglas. Christchurch. Pegasus Press. 1956 (illustrator)
- Some Canterbury Churches. Warren, Doreen. Pegasus Press. 1957 (illustrator)
- Old homes of Lyttelton Harbour Christchurch. Pegasus Press. 1966. (writer and illustrator)
- Christchurch Sketch Book. Christchurch. Fanny Buss Studios. 1972 (writer and illustrator)
