= Hope Gibbons =

New Zealand businessman, philanthropist and politician (1856–1947)

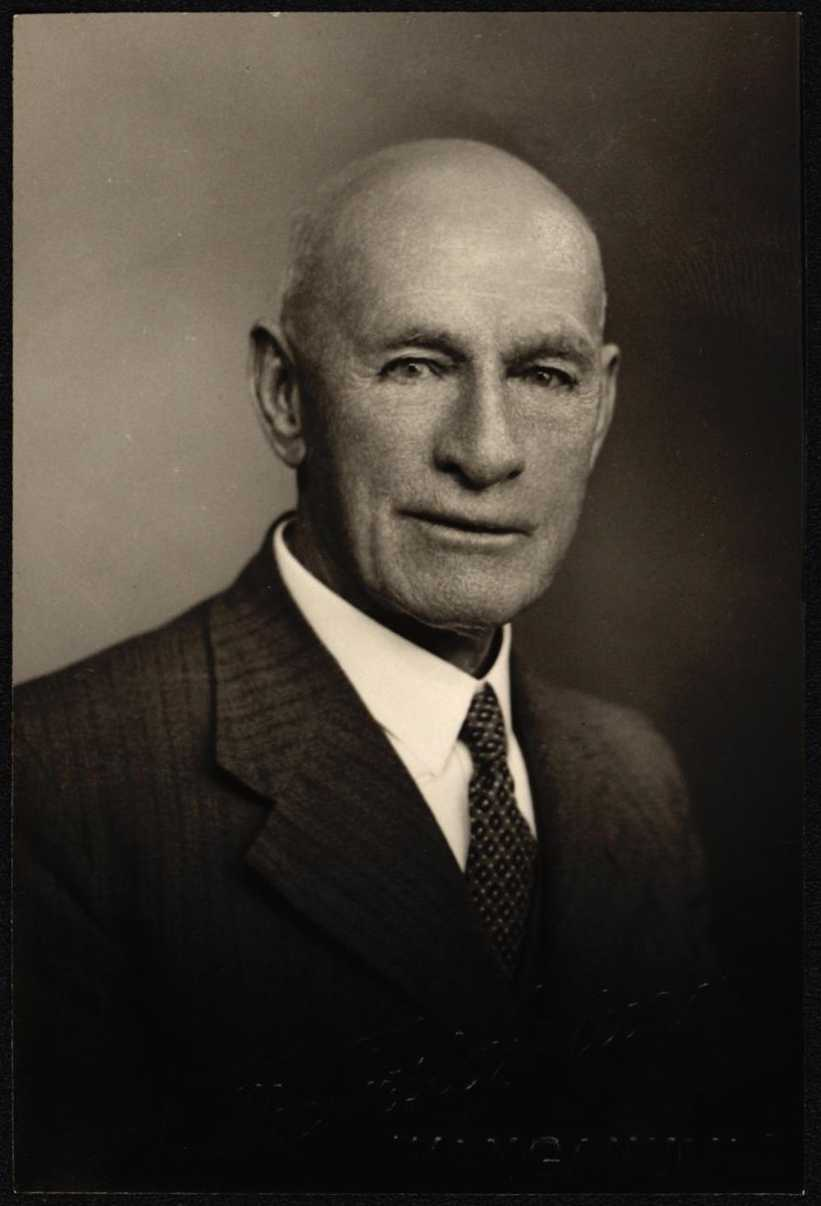
- Gibbons in 1938
- Born: 4 October 1856; Launceston, Tasmania
- Died: 25 June 1947 (aged 90)
- Known for: Businessman, philanthropist and local politician

Hopeful Gibbons MBE (4 October 1856 – 25 June 1947), known as Hope Gibbons, was a New Zealand businessman, philanthropist and local politician.

Born in Launceston, Tasmania, Australia on 4 October 1856 he arrived in New Zealand in 1862. He started in business on his own in 1879 by buying a run-down brewery but his principal businesses were the supply and distribution of bicycles and motorcycles throughout the country and Colonial Motor Company, which held the Ford franchise for the country and assembled their cars. From 1936 it ceased assembly but retained most metropolitan dealerships.

He was Mayor of Wanganui from 1924 to 1927.

Hope Gibbons married Jessie Barnes in 1881 and they had one daughter and four sons: Elsie Gibbons (1886–1960, married Alfred Gower), Hopeful Barnes Gibbons (1882–1955), Alfred Barnes Gibbons (1884–1961), Robert Barnes Gibbons (1889–1973) and Norman Barnes Gibbons (1891–1951). Hope Gibbon's Grandson Hopeful Hope Gibbons, by his eldest son Hope Gibbons, was killed serving as Second Lieutenant during World War II in 1941, serving with the Reserve Mechanical Transport Company of the New Zealand Army Service in Crete.

The Hope Gibbons building, built in 1916 on the corner of Taranaki and Dixon Streets in Wellington is named after him.

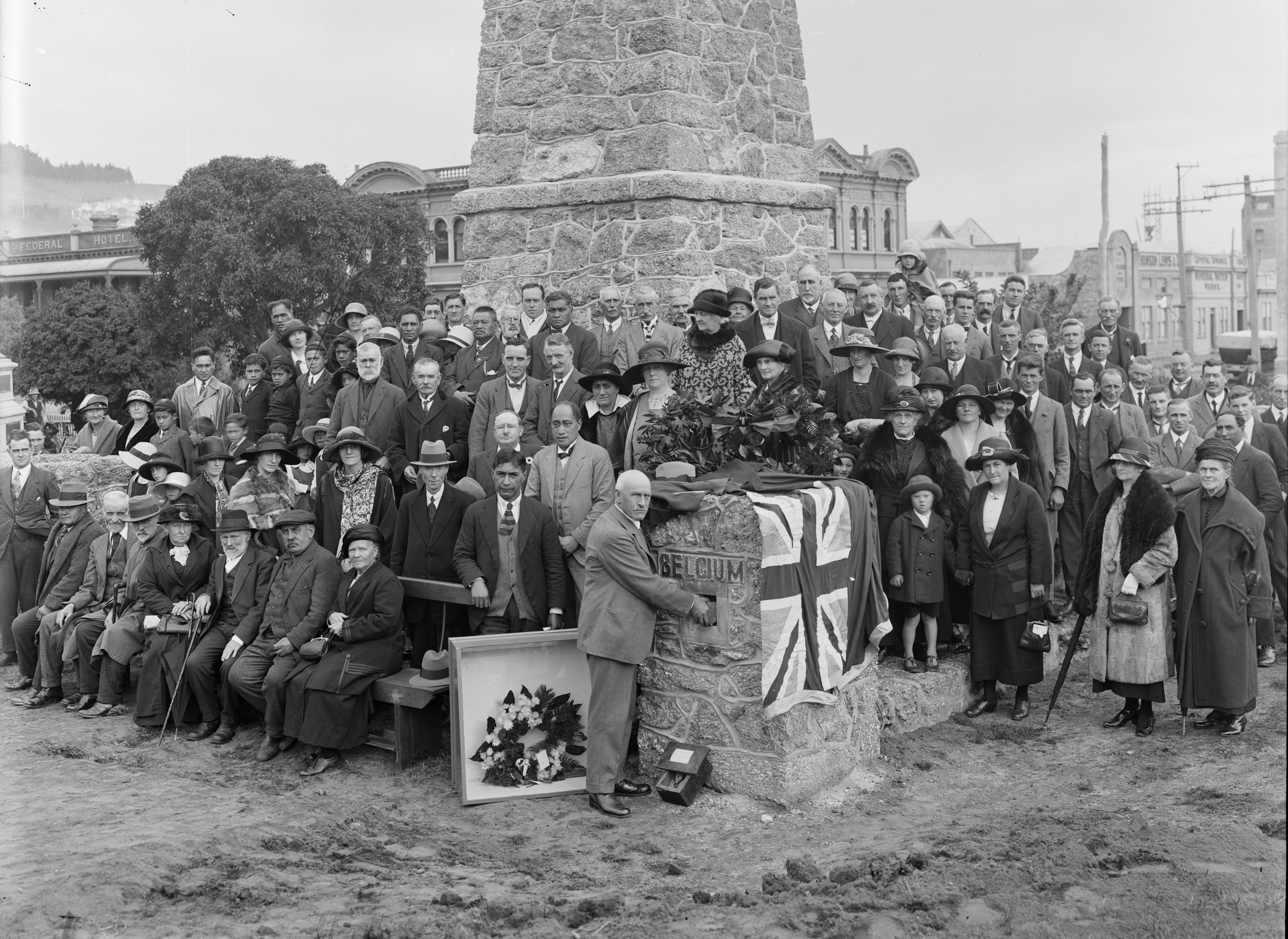
Mayor of Wanganui, Hope Gibbons, placing soil from the battlefields of Belgium in the Wanganui Maori War Memorial on Anzac Day 1925

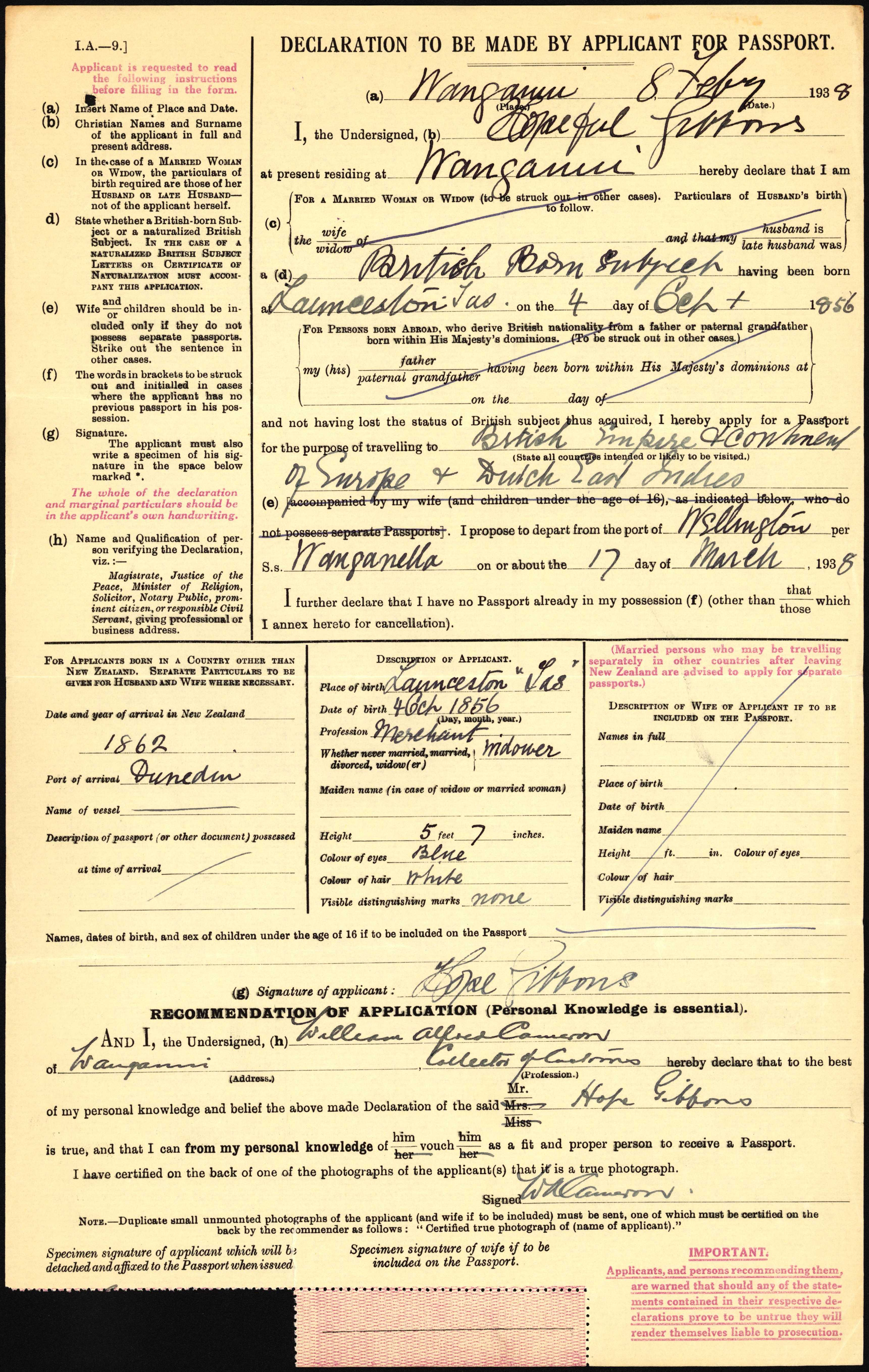
Hopeful Gibbons passport application (1938)
