= Wanganui Branch =

Railway branch line in New Zealand

Map

The Wanganui Branch is a 5.00 km branch line railway in the Manawatū-Whanganui region of New Zealand's North Island. It links Wanganui with the Marton - New Plymouth Line (MNPL) at Aramoho and has been open since 21 January 1878, although solely for freight traffic since 7 September 1959. Another branch line diverged from the Wanganui Branch near its terminus, the Castlecliff Branch.

The first grant from the Provincial Growth Fund in February 2018 included $6 million for the Whanganui rail line.

== Construction ==
The line out of Wanganui was constructed as part of the Wanganui and Foxton Railway. Contracts for construction were let in 1874, but various delays slowed work. By 1877, it was proceeding apace, and the five kilometres from the central Wanganui station up the western bank of the Whanganui River to Aramoho were opened for service on 21 January 1878. The line southwest to Palmerston North and Foxton subsequently became the MNPL to Marton, the North Island Main Trunk railway to Longburn, and the Foxton Branch to Foxton. The five kilometres between Wanganui and Aramoho became a branch of the MNPL from 1879 when work began on completing the line north to New Plymouth and the Taranaki region.

In about 1987 the final stretch of the branch alongside the Whanganui River was closed, and it was diverted to make an end-on junction with the Castlecliff Branch.

== Operation ==
=== Passenger services ===
Passenger services were originally provided by slow mixed trains, with a September 1878 timetable allowing for three daily to Palmerston North. The opening of the line to New Plymouth in March 1885 led to the introduction of trains between Wanganui and Hawera, with initially two services daily. On 31 October 1885, the privately owned Castlecliff Branch opened, diverging from the Wanganui Branch near its Taupo Quay terminus. From this date until April 1932, passenger services ran multiple times daily between Taupo Quay and Castlecliff; they became increasingly uneconomic after the local tramway opened a line to Castlecliff and it was this factor that caused their cancellation.

In December 1886, the New Plymouth Express began operating on the MNPL, bypassing Wanganui. A twice-daily connecting service known as "The Ferry" ran between Aramoho and Wanganui to connect with the Expresses. In Aramoho, it exchanged some carriages with the express so that passengers from Wellington or New Plymouth did not have to change trains to reach Wanganui and vice versa.

By the start of the 20th century, the slow mixed services between Wanganui and Hawera had become the subject of complaints that they did not suit the convenience of the locals for whom they were operated. Residents began agitating for a dedicated passenger train to run daily from Wanganui through Hawera to New Plymouth and return. It was not until 1926 that such a service was introduced, the Taranaki Flyer. It took approximately 4.5 hours to complete its journey, a considerable improvement on mixed trains. On 31 October 1955, the Flyer ran for the last time and was replaced by a railcar service operated by 88 seater and Standard RM class railcars.

The railcars did not last long, as declining patronage resulted in their cancellation from 7 February 1959. From this point, regular passenger services ceased to operate on the Wanganui Branch. Wanganui passengers instead had to board mainline trains in Aramoho; this arrangement lasted until 30 July 1977, when the final passenger service through Aramoho was cancelled. The only passenger services on the branch since 1959 have been infrequent excursions, such as those operated by Steam Incorporated and the New Zealand Railway and Locomotive Society. The SteamRail Wanganui heritage organisation is based at the Wanganui terminus and it operates charter excursions from this depot as well as providing facilities for visiting excursions to replenish fuel supplies.

=== Freight services ===
Freight traffic has always played a prominent role on the line, particularly when Wanganui had an active port. In 1878, the fact that one more train ran daily between Wanganui and Palmerston North than between Foxton and Palmerston North led Foxton business interests to fear that the more regular service would boost Wanganui's trade at the expense of Foxton. Trains currently operate less frequently, but are capable of carrying significantly more tonnage than 19th century services. One freight train arrives at lunchtime every weekday from Palmerston North, departing later in the afternoon. An additional morning service runs if required, including on weekends.

== Motive power ==
Motive power is currently provided by diesel locomotives, such as the DC and DX classes. In the era of steam locomotives, tank locomotives such as the W^{B} were based in Wanganui and worked the Branch. They were largely replaced by A^{B} class tender locomotives in the mid-1920s, but W^{W} class tank locomotives continued to shunt industrial sidings as late as the 1960s. From the mid-1950s, the dominant locomotive classes in the Wanganui area were the K and K^{A}, both of which saw use on the Branch. By the end of 1966, the branch was completely dieselised. Locomotives such as the DA class worked Wanganui trains until the introduction of the classes currently in use.

== See also ==
- Marton-New Plymouth Line
- North Island Main Trunk
- Castlecliff Branch
- Foxton Branch
- Raetihi Branch
- Toanui Branch
