= Otamatea, Whanganui =

Suburb of Whanganui

Otamatea
- Suburb
- Interactive map of Otamatea
- Coordinates: 39°54′27″S 175°01′20″E
- Country: New Zealand
- City: Whanganui
- Local authority: Whanganui District Council

Area
  - Land: 270 ha (670 acres)

Population (June 2025)
  - Total: 1,920
  - Density: 710/km^{2} (1,800/sq mi)
- Hospitals: Kowhainui Hospital

Brunswick
Westmere	Omatea	Aramoho
	Springvale	St Johns Hill

Otamatea is a residential suburb of Whanganui, New Zealand. Otamatea is under the local governance of the Whanganui District Council.

Otamatea is located on the northwestern edge of the Whanganui urban area, straddling State Highway 3 for approximately 3 kilometres (1.9 mi) north of Virginia Lake.

== Demographics ==
Otamatea covers 2.70 km^{2} (1.04 sq mi) and had an estimated population of 1,920 as of June 2025, with a population density of 711 people per km^{2}.

Historical population
Year	Pop.	±% p.a.
2006	1,317	—
2013	1,563	+2.48%
2018	1,734	+2.10%
2023	1,833	+1.12%
The 2006 population is for a smaller area of 2.23 km^{2}. Source:

Otamatea had a population of 1,833 in the 2023 New Zealand census, an increase of 99 people (5.7%) since the 2018 census, and an increase of 270 people (17.3%) since the 2013 census. There were 873 males, 957 females, and 3 people of other genders in 735 dwellings. 2.1% of people identified as LGBTIQ+. The median age was 54.9 years (compared with 38.1 years nationally). There were 288 people (15.7%) aged under 15 years, 168 (9.2%) aged 15 to 29, 711 (38.8%) aged 30 to 64, and 669 (36.5%) aged 65 or older.

People could identify as more than one ethnicity. The results were 88.5% European (Pākehā); 8.3% Māori; 1.5% Pasifika; 6.5% Asian; 0.8% Middle Eastern, Latin American and African New Zealanders (MELAA); and 3.9% other, which includes people giving their ethnicity as "New Zealander". English was spoken by 97.5%, Māori by 2.8%, Samoan by 0.7%, and other languages by 9.3%. No language could be spoken by 1.5% (e.g. too young to talk). New Zealand Sign Language was known by 0.3%. The percentage of people born overseas was 19.3, compared with 28.8% nationally.

Religious affiliations were 45.3% Christian, 1.3% Hindu, 0.3% Islam, 0.2% Māori religious beliefs, 0.5% Buddhist, 0.3% New Age, and 1.0% other religions. People who answered that they had no religion were 43.0%, and 8.0% of people did not answer the census question.

Of those at least 15 years old, 375 (24.3%) people had a bachelor's or higher degree, 843 (54.6%) had a post-high school certificate or diploma, and 321 (20.8%) people exclusively held high school qualifications. The median income was $35,800, compared with $41,500 nationally. 210 people (13.6%) earned over $100,000 compared to 12.1% nationally. The employment status of those at least 15 was 615 (39.8%) full-time, 189 (12.2%) part-time, and 21 (1.4%) unemployed.
