= Steamrail =

Steamrail or SteamRail may refer to:

- Steamrail Victoria, a railway preservation group in Victoria, Australia
- SteamRail Wanganui, a railway preservation group in Whanganui, New Zealand
