= Whanganui railway station =

Former railway station in New Zealand

Whanganui, Castlecliff Railway Co.
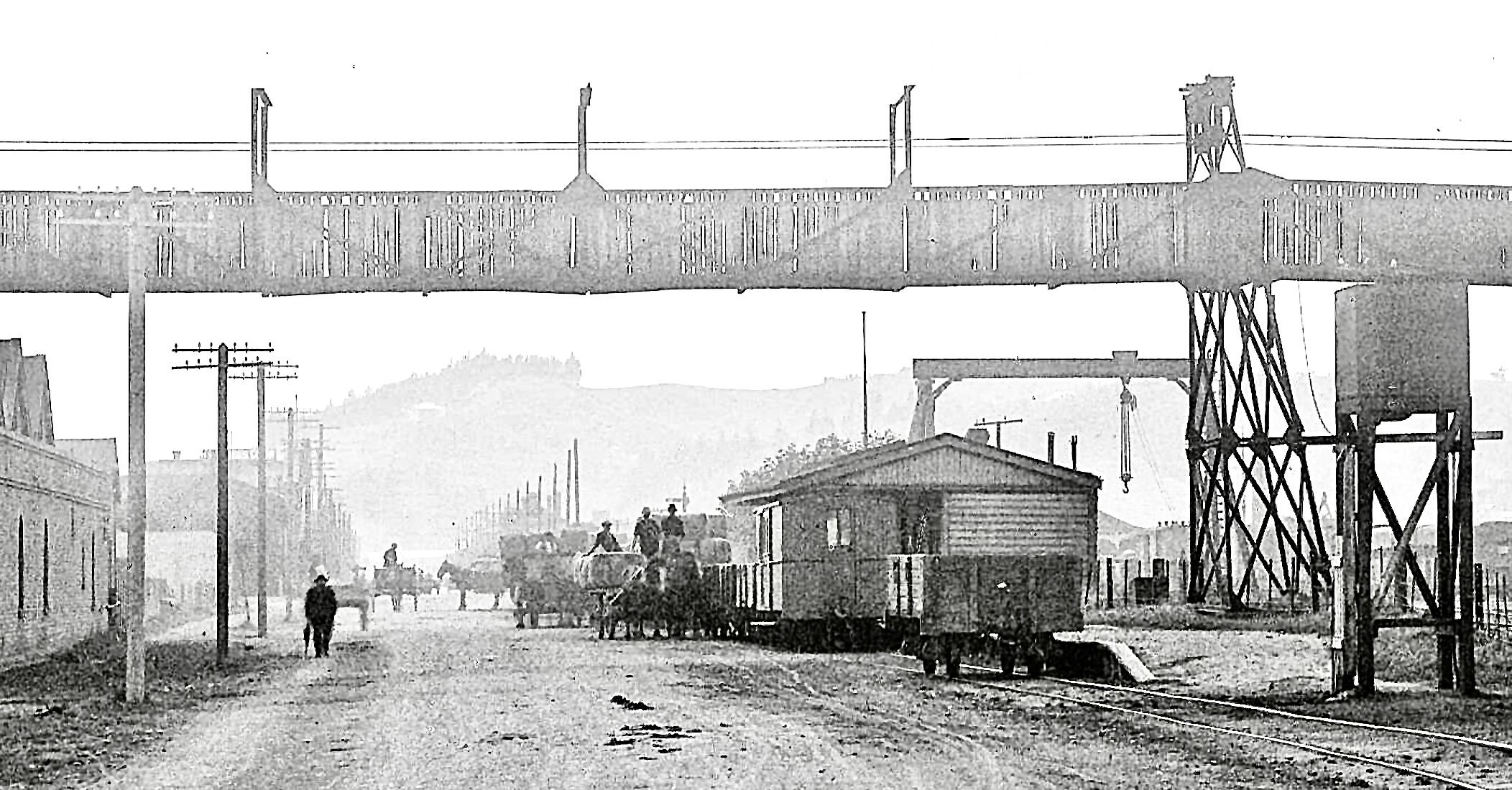
- Castlecliff Railway Co. terminus at Whanganui in 1922

General information
- Elevation: 3 m (9.8 ft)
- Line: Castlecliff Branch

History
- Opened: 31 October 1885
- Closed: passengers April 1932

Services
Preceding station	Historical railways	Following station
Terminus	Castlecliff Branch; KiwiRail	Castlecliff; Line open, station closed 5.78 km (3.59 mi)
Location

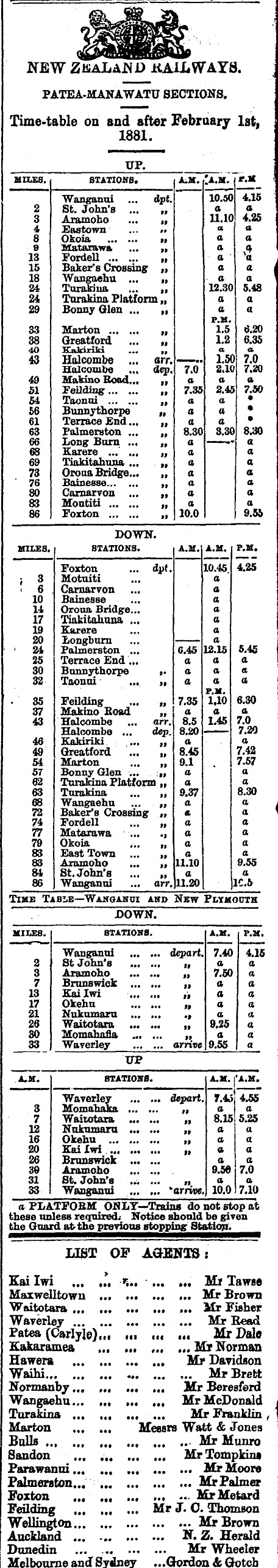
1881 timetable Whanganui-Foxton

Whanganui had three railway stations -

- Wanganui was the terminus of the NZR Whanganui branch of the Marton-New Plymouth line from 1878. It closed to passengers in 1959 and freight traffic moved to a container terminal at Castlecliff in 2010.
- Castlecliff Railway Co had a passenger station near the gasworks from 1885 to 1932.
- St John's served the St Johns Hill northern suburb, on the Whanganui branch, from 1881 to 1960.

All trace of the stations has gone, though most of the railway remains in use for freight.

There has also been a miniature railway station at Tot Town in Kowhai Park since 1963.

== Castlecliff Railway Company station ==
The Wanganui Heads, or later, Castlecliff Railway Company had a station in Whanganui on Taupo Quay from 1885. It closed to passengers in 1932 and was demolished in 1963.

In 1882 the Heads company had plans for a station near the junction with the Whanganui branch, with an engine shed, coal store, store room, goods shed, office, lobby, ladies waiting room and urinal. In 1883 the company agreed to alterations, but it was noted, "General Manager does not approve of connecting the Wanganui Heads Ry with the Foxton – Wanganui Ry", possibly because the PWD thought it should be government owned. On Monday, 4 August 1884 the first sod of the railway was turned and a temporary siding took sleepers and rails to stack on a reserve. The first passengers were carried in wagons on 3 April 1885 and by July 1885 the line was complete, with a certificate of inspection issued on 29 September 1885. NZR supplied a 4-wheel composite coach for the line and allowed trains to use their station at weekends. Weekday trains stopped opposite Murray's Foundry, where a ticket office and platform were built in December 1885. In 1897 the company asked to extend their platform on Taupo Quay. It was reported in 1900 that the main station would be shared, but it still was not. From 1901 67 ch (1.3 km) of the line from Wanganui was realigned to take it off the road, work which was finished in 1903, when a new station, built by Russell and Bignall, opened on 4 May 1903, opposite the gasworks. On 1 February 1956 the line was taken over by NZR. In May 1961 the line was again moved to run in a subway below the government funded motorway to Cobham Bridge, which opened on 18 November 1961. By contrast, in the next month the railway on the north breakwater at Castlecliff was replaced by a road. In 1963 the 1903 station was demolished.

St John's railway station
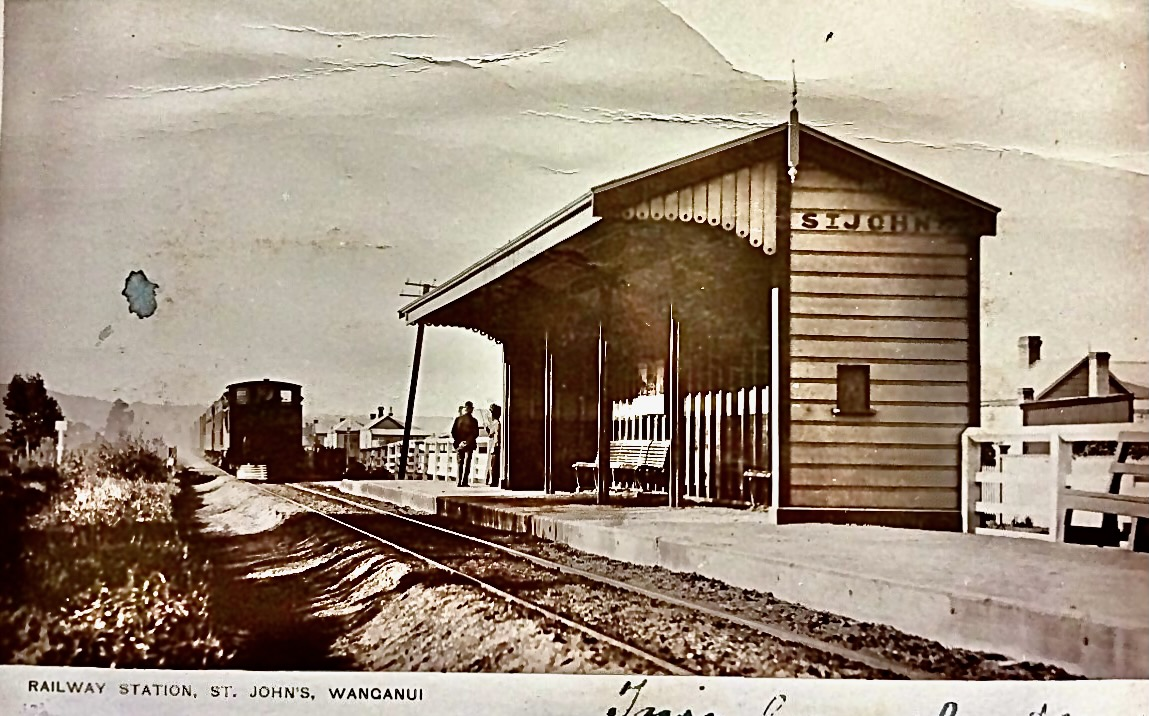
- St John's, probably about 1900, with a Wb class 2-6-2T, which worked the line from 1899 until the mid 1920s

General information
- Location: New Zealand
- Elevation: 7 m (23 ft)
- Line: Wanganui Branch
- Distance: Marton 45.18 km (28.07 mi)

History
- Opened: 1 February 1881
- Closed: 28 March 1960

Services
Preceding station	Historical railways	Following station
Aromoho; Line open, station closed 1 mi 21 ch (2.0 km)	Wanganui Branch; KiwiRail	Wanganui; Line open, station closed 1 mi 54 ch (2.7 km)
Location

== St John's station ==
St John's was a flag station, which served the St Johns Hill suburb until 1960. It was at the corner of Peat Street and London Street. There was possibly an earlier station named Havelock.

A record dated 27 April 1878 said an engine derailed at facing points at Havelock station on the Wanganui-Patea railway. A Fairlie locomotive was derailed that day. The station may have opened when trains started running on the Wanganui Town Branch to Turakina on 21 January 1878, but Havelock was not shown in the timetable. A record indicates Havelock closed in 1881; St John's was first shown in the timetable from 1 February 1881, with two trains a day to both Palmerston North and Waverley.

A 7th class station 1 mi 51 ch (2.6 km) from Wanganui was proposed in 1877, when a contract for a station was reported as signed. However, in 1882 a shelter shed was proposed and by 1896 St Johns had a shelter shed, platform and cart approach. In 1900 latrines and a verandah were considered and in 1915 lighting. A trolley line ran across London Street, allowing the Fresh Food Co. to move churns of cream and its butter and cheese to and from the platform from 1912 to 1935. St John's closed to all traffic on Monday, 28 March 1960 and on 23 July tenders were invited for removal of the building.

Whanganui railway station
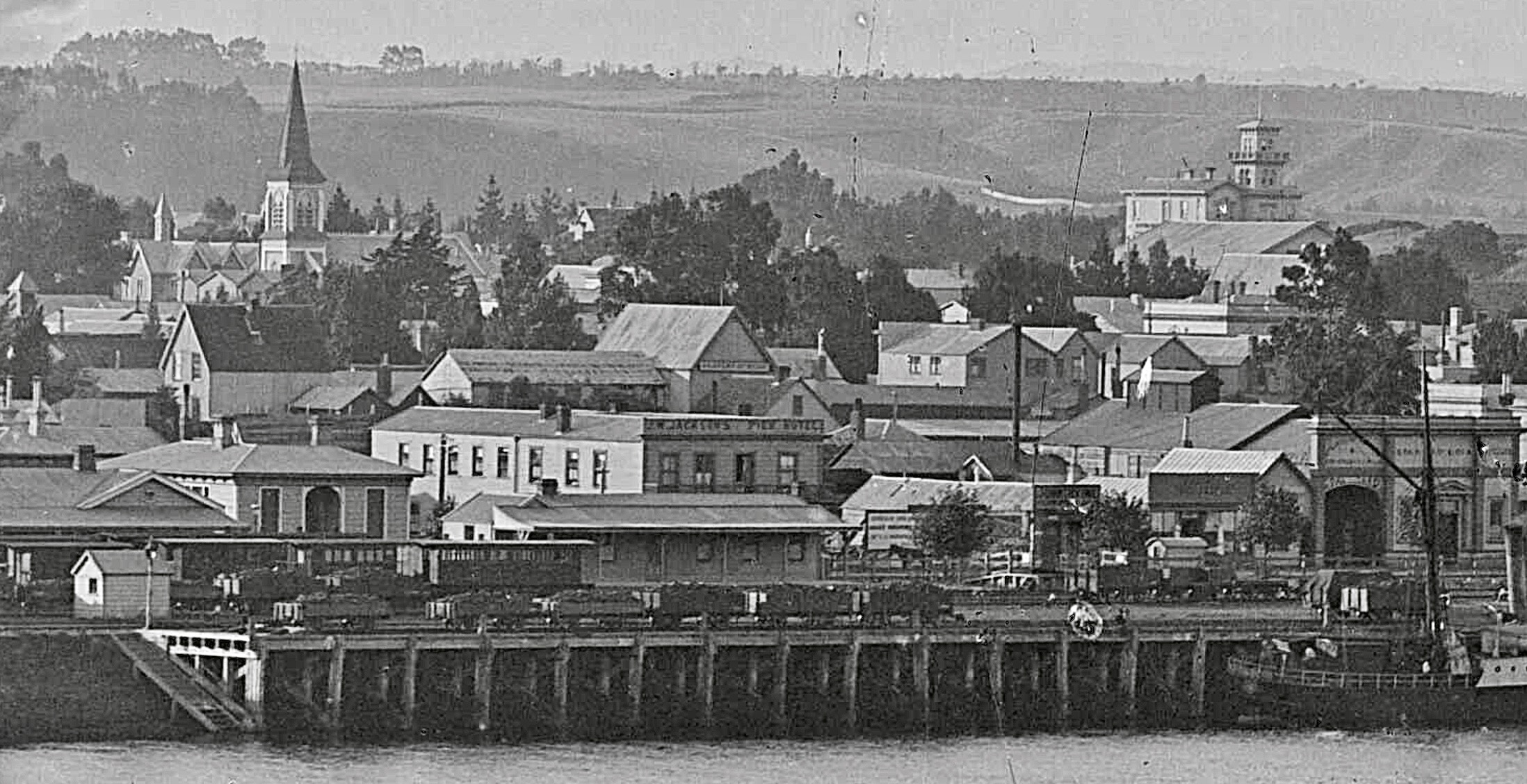
- Whanganui railway station in 1880s

General information
- Coordinates: 39.938°S 175.053°E
- Elevation: 3 m (9.8 ft)
- Owner: New Zealand Railways Department
- Line: Wanganui Branch
- Distance: Marton 47.88 km (29.75 mi)

History
- Opened: 21 January 1878
- Closed: passengers 7 September 1959

Services
Preceding station	Historical railways	Following station
St John's; Line open, station closed 1 mi 54 ch (2.7 km)	Wanganui Branch; KiwiRail	Castlecliff; Line open, station closed 5.78 km (3.59 mi)
Location

== NZR Whanganui station ==
=== Opening ===
The station opened with the Whanganui Town Branch on 21 January 1878. The Aramoho to Turakina railway had opened on 17 May 1877 and had two trains a day from 18 May. The line to Marton opened on 4 February 1878. From 5 May 1880, Whanganui had three trains a day to Palmerston North and two to Kai Iwi, though the line to Kai Iwi did not officially open until 16 September 1880.

The first work on the railway was a 1 July 1875 contract with Calman & Richardson to build a wharf for £788-16s. By 26 October 1875 James Moore Edwards had built an open ended shed for two engines. By 3 November 1875 there was a store room and office and by 25 December 1875 the wharf was ready. By 1 February 1877 G M Chalmers had built a temporary station on an unused bit of Churton Street. On 19 July 1877 William Rowe got a £4795.6.8 contract to build Wanganui Town Branch, which was finished by 4 November 1877. In 1877 and 1878 housing and offices for a stationmaster and public works (PWD) staff were bought and a 50-ton coal store built.

The station was 2 mi 76 ch (4.7 km) from Aramoho Junction, 58 mi 54 ch (94.4 km) from Hāwera, 62 mi 74 ch (101.3 km) from New Plymouth and 85 mi 30 ch (137.4 km) from Foxton.

=== Improvements ===
By 1896 there was a special station, platform, cart approach, stationmaster's house and urinals. Fixed signals were added by 1898 and there was a trial of Sykes' block signals to Aramoho in 1899. In 1945 a new signal box was built near the end of the platform.

There was a turntable by 1911. In 1989 the 21.3 m (70 ft) turntable on Taupo Quay was disconnected, but it has been restored by SteamRail Wanganui, which has a shed on the wharf.

==== Passengers ====
A February 1878 plan, to extend the station and add a cloak room and booking clerks office, was dropped by April 1878, as the Churton Street station was temporary and a much more extended station was envisaged on Ridgway Street. On 24 November 1880 tenders were invited for a further goods shed and station buildings. By 9 April 1881 James Tawse had built a 100 ft (30 m) x 42 ft (13 m) goods shed and extended and moved the station buildings. Tenders for the station were invited in July 1881 and it was built by 25 November 1881. In 1882 a verandah was added to the station. In 1885 an estimate was made of the cost of lighting the station with gas. Telephones were connected from 21 November 1885 at the station and wharf, in 1886 at the PWD office, District Manager's office, and East Town Workshops, the District Engineer in 1897, the Foreman of Works and District Manager's house 1898, the stationmaster's house 1899 and the running shed foreman's house in 1901. From 1 January 1940, a teleprinter linked Whanganui and Wellington.

In 1881 PWD were asked for a carriage washing shed, but it was not until 1893 that a carriage shed was built. In 1910 a concrete stage was added for dining cars.

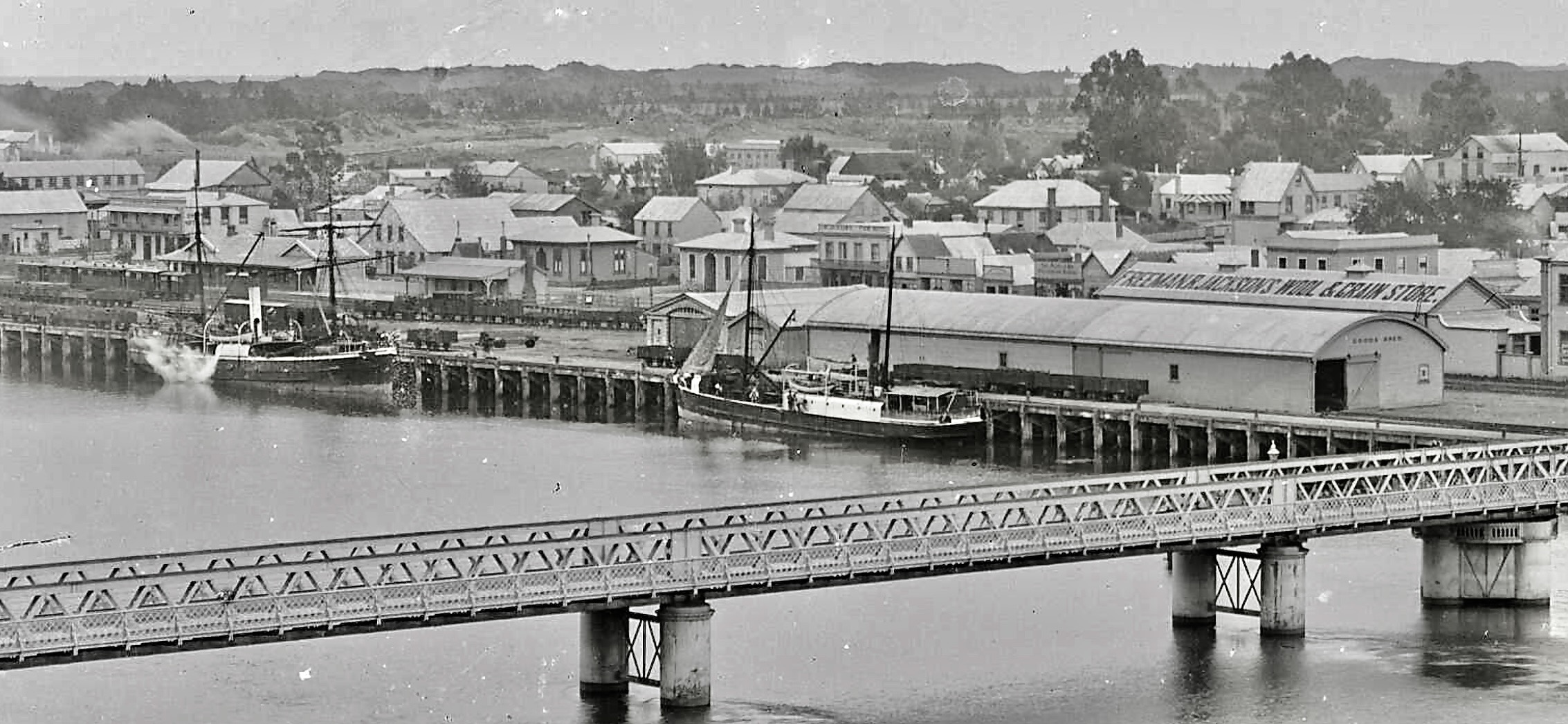
1880s Whanganui railway station

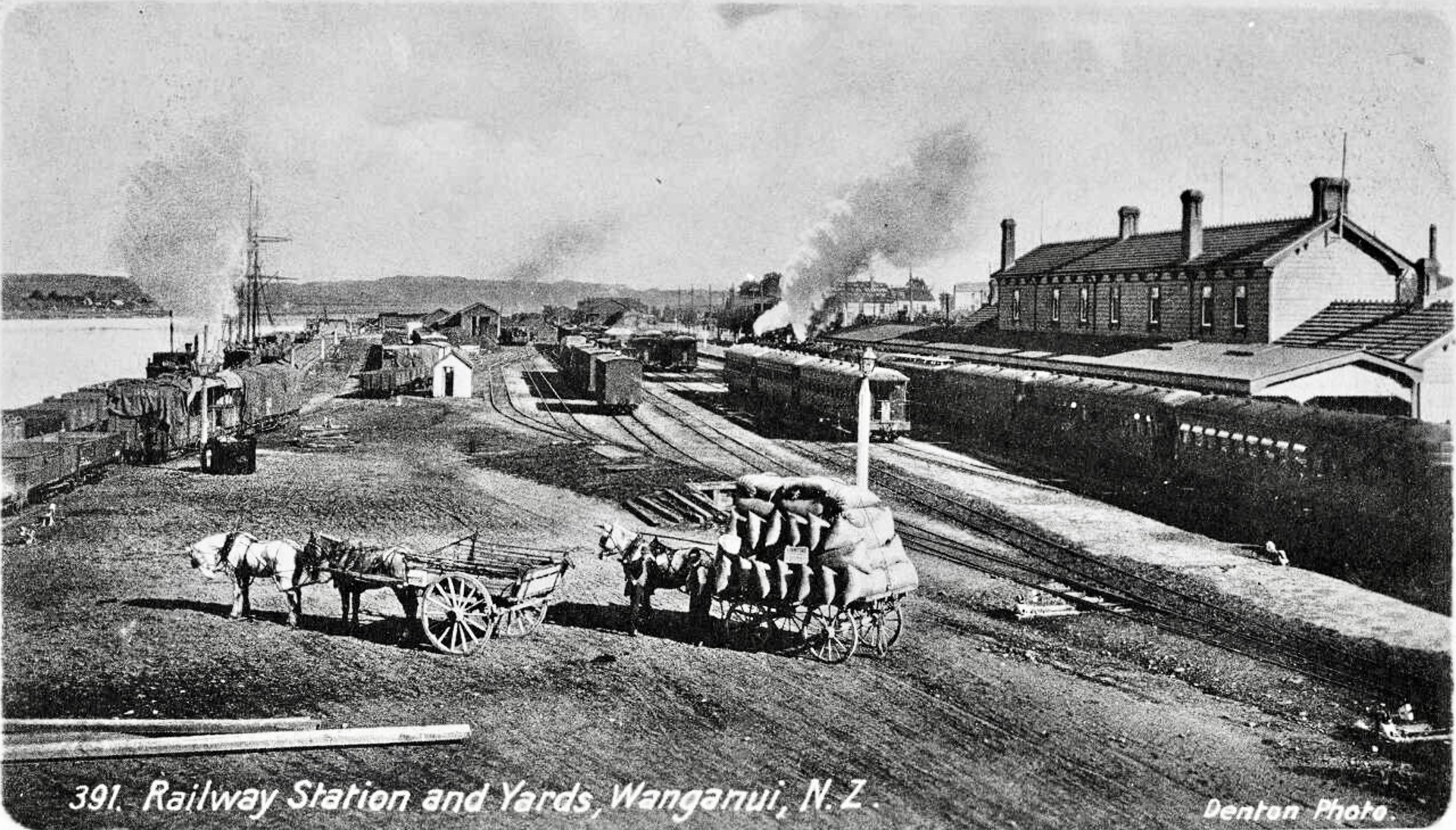
Whanganui railway station and wharves after 1901

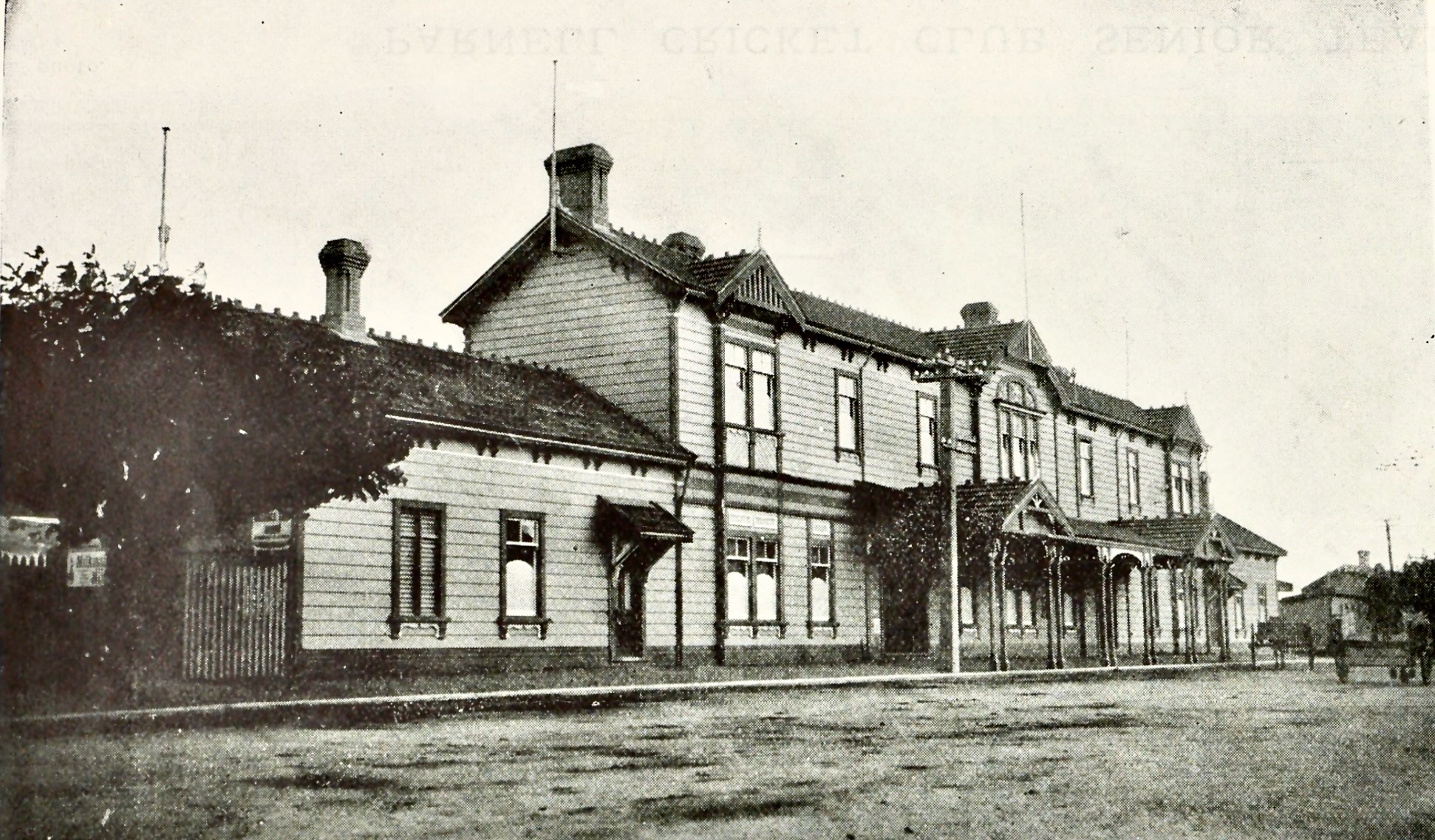
Whanganui 1901 station

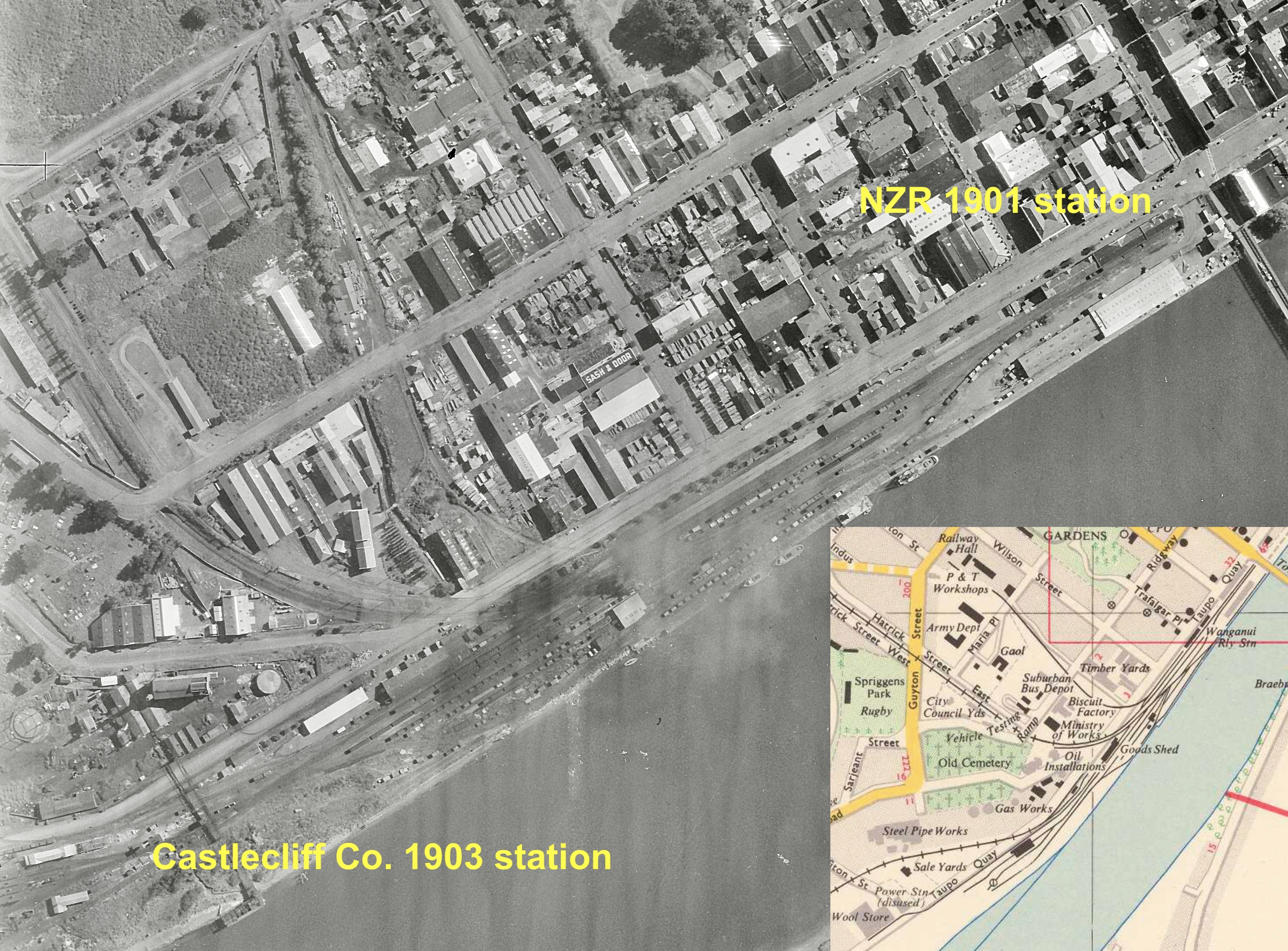
The 1903 Castlecliff station was about 400 metres from the 1901 NZR station

===== 1901 station =====
A new station, opened on 29 April 1901, cost £2,500 to £3,000 and was 18 ft (5.5 m) wide and 187 ft 6in long on the lower storey and 120 ft (37 m) on the upper. The lower had a 15 ft (4.6 m) long guards and porters room, 10 ft (3.0 m) luggage room, 40 ft (12 m) parcels office, 22 ft (6.7 m) booking office, 12 ft (3.7 m) stationmaster's and traffic inspector's offices, 10 ft (3.0 m) clerk's office and 15 ft (4.6 m) ladies' waiting room and lavatories. The Taupo Quay entrance, under a 68 ft (21 m) x 10 ft (3.0 m) verandah, had a 25 ft (7.6 m) x 15 ft (4.6 m) general lobby, with seats, a fireplace, 2 ticket windows and a wide, easy graded, staircase. Upstairs a 54 ft (16 m) x 4 ft (1.2 m) corridor lead to the 18 ft (5.5 m) square District Traffic Manager's office, 13.6 ft (4.1 m) x 12.6 ft (3.8 m) records, 7.6 ft (2.3 m) x 7 ft (2.1 m) lavatories, 29.6 ft (9.0 m) x 13.6 ft (4.1 m) telegraph gallery, and 43 ft (13 m) x 18 ft (5.5 m) traffic clerk's office. The platform was enlarged from 68 ft (21 m) x 12 ft (3.7 m) to 187 ft (57 m) x 20 ft (6.1 m), with five double incandescent globe lights. To ease the curve at the station approach, the line was moved westwards, from Churton Street to run beside a new Hatrick Street, as from 5 February 1906. There was a bookstall at the station from at least 1902 to 1947. By 1908 the station dealt with 11 trains a day. The area around the station flooded in 1904 and 1940.

===== Ticket sales =====
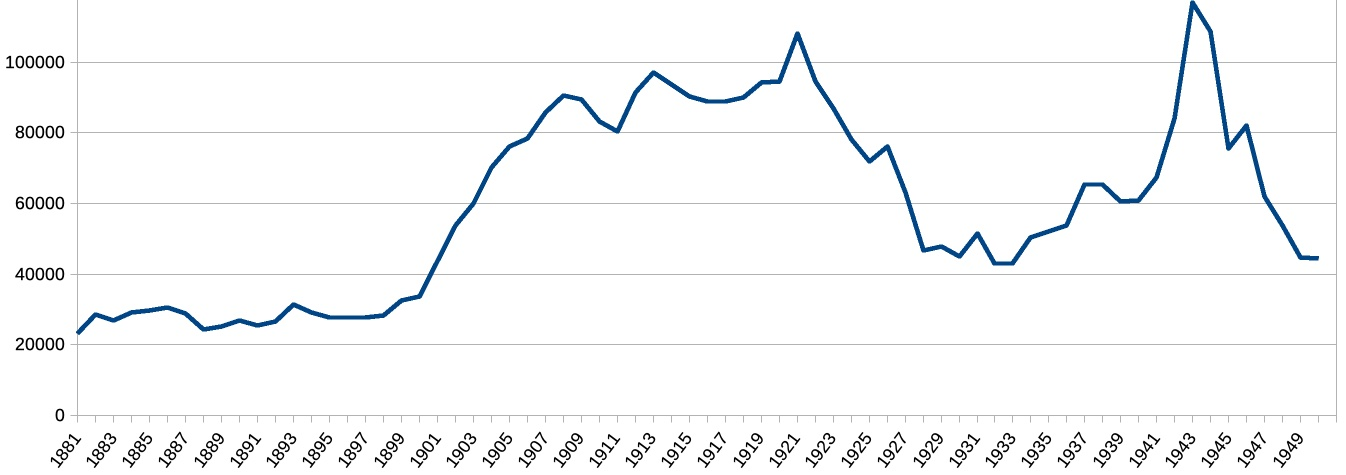
tickets sales 1881–1950 – derived from annual returns to Parliament of "Statement of Revenue for each Station for the Year ended"

Whanganui had its annual returns of traffic recorded, as did Aramoho. Ticket sales reached a peak of 116,843 in 1943, plus 190 season tickets.

This graph shows the variation in passenger numbers from 1881 to 1950 (detail and staff numbers shown in table below):

Year	tickets	season tickets	staff	source	title
1881	23179		12	https://paperspast.natlib.govt.nz/parliamentary/appendix-to-the-journals-of-the-house-of-representatives/1881/I/967	RETURN No. 9. Statement of Revenue and Expenditure of each Station for the Year ending 31 March 1881
1882	28436		13	https://paperspast.natlib.govt.nz/parliamentary/appendix-to-the-journals-of-the-house-of-representatives/1882/I/825	RETURN No. 10. Statement of Revenue and Expenditure of each Station for the Year ending 31 March 1882
1883	26817		14	https://paperspast.natlib.govt.nz/parliamentary/appendix-to-the-journals-of-the-house-of-representatives/1883/I/896	RETURN No. 10. STATEMENT of Revenue and Expenditure of each Station for the Year ended 31 March 1883
1884	29110		15	https://paperspast.natlib.govt.nz/parliamentary/appendix-to-the-journals-of-the-house-of-representatives/1884/I/844	RETURN No. 10. STATEMENT of Revenue and Expenditure of each Station for the Twelve Months ending 31 March 1884
1885	29555	31	19	https://paperspast.natlib.govt.nz/parliamentary/appendix-to-the-journals-of-the-house-of-representatives/1885/I/1157?large_image=true	RETURN No. 10. STATEMENT of Revenue and Expenditure of each Station for the Twelve Months ending 31 March 1885
1886	30427	25	20	https://paperspast.natlib.govt.nz/parliamentary/appendix-to-the-journals-of-the-house-of-representatives/1886/I/1139?large_image=true	RETURN No. 10. STATEMENT of Revenue and Expenditure of each Station for the Twelve Months ending 31 March 1886
1887	28717	25	13	https://paperspast.natlib.govt.nz/parliamentary/appendix-to-the-journals-of-the-house-of-representatives/1887/I/921?large_image=true	RETURN No. 10. STATEMENT of Revenue and Expenditure of each Station for the Twelve Months ending 31 March 1887
1888	24241	22	15	https://paperspast.natlib.govt.nz/parliamentary/appendix-to-the-journals-of-the-house-of-representatives/1888/I/1011?large_image=true	RETURN No. 10. STATEMENT of Revenue and Expenditure of each Station for the Twelve Months ending 31 March 1888
1889	25028	33	19	https://paperspast.natlib.govt.nz/parliamentary/appendix-to-the-journals-of-the-house-of-representatives/1889/I/1069?large_image=true	RETURN No. 10. STATEMENT of Revenue and Expenditure of each Station for the Twelve Months ending 31 March 1889
1890	26929	29	19	https://paperspast.natlib.govt.nz/parliamentary/appendix-to-the-journals-of-the-house-of-representatives/1890/I/1065?large_image=true	RETURN No. 10. STATEMENT of Revenue and Expenditure of each Station for the Twelve Months ending 31 March 1890
1891	25442	18	20	https://paperspast.natlib.govt.nz/parliamentary/appendix-to-the-journals-of-the-house-of-representatives/1891/II/1264?large_image=true	RETURN No. 10. STATEMENT of Revenue and Expenditure of each Station for the Twelve Months ending 31 March 1891
1892	26522	23	21	https://paperspast.natlib.govt.nz/parliamentary/appendix-to-the-journals-of-the-house-of-representatives/1892/I/1164?large_image=true	RETURN No. 10. STATEMENT of Revenue and Expenditure of each Station for the Twelve Months ending 31 March 1892
1893	31354	49	25	https://paperspast.natlib.govt.nz/parliamentary/appendix-to-the-journals-of-the-house-of-representatives/1893/I/1495?large_image=true	RETURN No. 10. STATEMENT of Revenue and Expenditure of each Station for the Twelve Months ending 31 March 1893
1894	29058	34	27	https://paperspast.natlib.govt.nz/parliamentary/appendix-to-the-journals-of-the-house-of-representatives/1894/I/1388?large_image=true	RETURN No. 10. STATEMENT of Revenue and Expenditure of each Station for the Twelve Months ending 31 March 1894
1895	27640	53	27	https://paperspast.natlib.govt.nz/parliamentary/appendix-to-the-journals-of-the-house-of-representatives/1895/I/1586?large_image=true	RETURN No. 10. STATEMENT of Revenue and Expenditure of each Station for the Twelve Months ending 31 March 1895
1896	27768	97	27	https://paperspast.natlib.govt.nz/parliamentary/appendix-to-the-journals-of-the-house-of-representatives/1896/I/1624?large_image=true	RETURN No. 10. STATEMENT of Revenue and Expenditure of each Station for the Twelve Months ending 31 March 1896
1897	27559	114	29	https://paperspast.natlib.govt.nz/parliamentary/appendix-to-the-journals-of-the-house-of-representatives/1897/II/1611?large_image=true	RETURN No. 12. STATEMENT of Revenue and Expenditure of each Station for the Year ended 31 March 1897
1898	28321	95	30	https://paperspast.natlib.govt.nz/parliamentary/appendix-to-the-journals-of-the-house-of-representatives/1898/I/1671?large_image=true	RETURN No. 12. STATEMENT of Revenue and Expenditure of each Station for the Year ended 31 March 1898
1899	32452	43	28	https://paperspast.natlib.govt.nz/parliamentary/appendix-to-the-journals-of-the-house-of-representatives/1899/I/1825?large_image=true	RETURN No. 12. STATEMENT of Revenue and Expenditure of each Station for the Year ended 31 March 1899
1900	33783	61	40	https://paperspast.natlib.govt.nz/parliamentary/appendix-to-the-journals-of-the-house-of-representatives/1900/I/1613?large_image=true	RETURN No. 12. STATEMENT of Revenue and Expenditure of each Station for the Year ended 31 March 1900
1901		0		Pages 30–35 missing	RETURN No. 12. STATEMENT of Revenue and Expenditure of each Station for the Year ended 31 March 1901
1902	53831	104	41	https://paperspast.natlib.govt.nz/parliamentary/appendix-to-the-journals-of-the-house-of-representatives/1902/I/1437?large_image=true	RETURN No. 12. STATEMENT of Revenue and Expenditure of each Station for the Year ended 31 March 1902
1903	59859	93	38	https://paperspast.natlib.govt.nz/parliamentary/appendix-to-the-journals-of-the-house-of-representatives/1903/I/1872?large_image=true	RETURN No. 12. STATEMENT of Revenue and Expenditure of each Station for the Year ended 31 March 1903
1904	70181	106	41	https://paperspast.natlib.govt.nz/parliamentary/appendix-to-the-journals-of-the-house-of-representatives/1904/I/1849?large_image=true	RETURN No. 12. STATEMENT of Revenue and Expenditure of each Station for the Year ended 31 March 1904
1905	76246	106	43	https://paperspast.natlib.govt.nz/parliamentary/appendix-to-the-journals-of-the-house-of-representatives/1905/I/3768?large_image=true	RETURN No. 12. STATEMENT of Revenue and Expenditure of each Station for the Year ended 31 March 1905
1906	78331	161	44	https://paperspast.natlib.govt.nz/parliamentary/appendix-to-the-journals-of-the-house-of-representatives/1906/II/1601?large_image=true	RETURN No. 12. STATEMENT of Revenue and Expenditure of each Station for the Year ended 31 March 1906
1907	85849	163	45	https://paperspast.natlib.govt.nz/parliamentary/appendix-to-the-journals-of-the-house-of-representatives/1907/I/2543?large_image=true	RETURN No. 12. STATEMENT of Revenue and Expenditure of each Station for the Year ended 31 March 1907
1908	90636	208	51, or 45 permanent staff and 30 casual wharf hands	https://paperspast.natlib.govt.nz/parliamentary/appendix-to-the-journals-of-the-house-of-representatives/1908/I/2062?large_image=true	RETURN No. 12. STATEMENT of Revenue and Expenditure of each Station for the Year ended 31 March 1908
1909	89521	310	98	https://paperspast.natlib.govt.nz/parliamentary/appendix-to-the-journals-of-the-house-of-representatives/1909/II/1832?large_image=true	RETURN No. 12. STATEMENT of Revenue and Expenditure of each Station for the Year ended 31 March 1909
1910	83134	375	96	https://paperspast.natlib.govt.nz/parliamentary/appendix-to-the-journals-of-the-house-of-representatives/1910/I/2051?large_image=true	RETURN No. 12. STATEMENT of Revenue and Expenditure of each Station for the Year ended 31 March 1910
1911	80466	392	97	https://paperspast.natlib.govt.nz/parliamentary/appendix-to-the-journals-of-the-house-of-representatives/1911/I/2498?large_image=true	RETURN No. 12. STATEMENT of Revenue and Expenditure of each Station for the Year ended 31 March 1911
1912	91476	445	98	https://paperspast.natlib.govt.nz/parliamentary/appendix-to-the-journals-of-the-house-of-representatives/1912/II/2420?large_image=true	RETURN No. 12. STATEMENT of Revenue and Expenditure of each Station for the Year ended 31 March 1912
1913	97211	363	59	https://paperspast.natlib.govt.nz/parliamentary/appendix-to-the-journals-of-the-house-of-representatives/1913/I/3693?large_image=true	RETURN No. 12. STATEMENT of Revenue and Expenditure of each Station for the Year ended 31 March 1913
1914	93788	341		https://paperspast.natlib.govt.nz/parliamentary/appendix-to-the-journals-of-the-house-of-representatives/1914/I/2031?large_image=true	RETURN No. 12. Statement of Revenue for each Station for the Year ended 31 March 1914
1915	90428	356		https://paperspast.natlib.govt.nz/parliamentary/appendix-to-the-journals-of-the-house-of-representatives/1915/I/1638?large_image=true	RETURN No. 12. Statement of Revenue for each Station for the Year ended 31 March 1915
1916	88999	304		https://paperspast.natlib.govt.nz/parliamentary/appendix-to-the-journals-of-the-house-of-representatives/1916/I/1053?large_image=true	RETURN No. 12. Statement of Revenue for each Station for the Year ended 31 March 1916
1917	88853	200		https://paperspast.natlib.govt.nz/parliamentary/appendix-to-the-journals-of-the-house-of-representatives/1917/I/1123?large_image=true	RETURN No. 12. Statement of Revenue for each Station for the Year ended 31 March 1917
1918	89951	136		https://paperspast.natlib.govt.nz/parliamentary/appendix-to-the-journals-of-the-house-of-representatives/1918/I-II/1159?large_image=true	RETURN No. 12. Statement of Revenue for each Station for the Year ended 31 March 1918
1919	94261	164		https://paperspast.natlib.govt.nz/parliamentary/appendix-to-the-journals-of-the-house-of-representatives/1919/I/1231?large_image=true	RETURN No. 12. Statement of Revenue for each Station for the Year ended 31 March 1919
1920	94703	130		https://paperspast.natlib.govt.nz/parliamentary/appendix-to-the-journals-of-the-house-of-representatives/1920/I/1349?large_image=true	RETURN No. 12. Statement of Revenue for each Station for the Year ended 31 March 1920
1921	108274	105		https://paperspast.natlib.govt.nz/parliamentary/appendix-to-the-journals-of-the-house-of-representatives/1921/I-II/1452?large_image=true	RETURN No. 12. Statement of Revenue for each Station for the Year ended 31 March 1921
1922	94464	126	93	https://paperspast.natlib.govt.nz/parliamentary/appendix-to-the-journals-of-the-house-of-representatives/1922/I/1409?large_image=true	RETURN No. 12. Statement of Revenue for each Station for the Year ended 31 March 1922
1923	87000	164	82	https://paperspast.natlib.govt.nz/parliamentary/appendix-to-the-journals-of-the-house-of-representatives/1923/I-II/1321?large_image=true	RETURN No. 12. Statement of Revenue for each Station for the Year ended 31 March 1923
1924	78197	156	76	https://paperspast.natlib.govt.nz/parliamentary/appendix-to-the-journals-of-the-house-of-representatives/1924/I/2458?large_image=true	RETURN No. 12. Statement of Revenue for each Station for the Year ended 31 March 1924
1925	71993	119	85	https://paperspast.natlib.govt.nz/parliamentary/appendix-to-the-journals-of-the-house-of-representatives/1925/I/1805?large_image=true	RETURN No. 12. Statement of Traffic and Revenue for each Station for the Year ended 31 March 1925
1926	76105	101		https://paperspast.natlib.govt.nz/parliamentary/appendix-to-the-journals-of-the-house-of-representatives/1926/I/1931?large_image=true	STATEMENT No. 18 Statement of Traffic and Revenue for each Station for the Year ended 31 March 1926
1927	62977	76		https://paperspast.natlib.govt.nz/parliamentary/appendix-to-the-journals-of-the-house-of-representatives/1927/I/2231?large_image=true	STATEMENT No. 18 Statement of Traffic and Revenue for each Station for the Year ended 31 March 1927
1928	46706	92		https://paperspast.natlib.govt.nz/parliamentary/appendix-to-the-journals-of-the-house-of-representatives/1928/I/2629?large_image=true	STATEMENT No. 18 Statement of Traffic and Revenue for each Station for the Year ended 31 March 1928
1929	47884	143		https://paperspast.natlib.govt.nz/parliamentary/appendix-to-the-journals-of-the-house-of-representatives/1929/I/2091?large_image=true	STATEMENT No. 18 Statement of Traffic and Revenue for each Station for the Year ended 31 March 1929
1930	44903	169		https://paperspast.natlib.govt.nz/parliamentary/appendix-to-the-journals-of-the-house-of-representatives/1930/I/2213?large_image=true	STATEMENT No. 18 Statement of Traffic and Revenue for each Station for the Year ended 31 March 1930
1931	51545	114		https://paperspast.natlib.govt.nz/parliamentary/appendix-to-the-journals-of-the-house-of-representatives/1931/I-II/1779?large_image=true	STATEMENT No. 18 Statement of Traffic and Revenue for each Station for the Year ended 31 March 1931
1932	43062	113		https://paperspast.natlib.govt.nz/parliamentary/appendix-to-the-journals-of-the-house-of-representatives/1932/I-II/1935?large_image=true	STATEMENT No. 18 Statement of Traffic and Revenue for each Station for the Year ended 31 March 1932
1933	43131	220		https://paperspast.natlib.govt.nz/parliamentary/appendix-to-the-journals-of-the-house-of-representatives/1933/I/1389?large_image=true	STATEMENT No. 18 Statement of Traffic and Revenue for each Station for the Year ended 31 March 1933
1934	50335	236		https://paperspast.natlib.govt.nz/parliamentary/appendix-to-the-journals-of-the-house-of-representatives/1934/I/2279?large_image=true	STATEMENT No. 18 Statement of Traffic and Revenue for each Station for the Year ended 31 March 1934
1935	52137	317		https://paperspast.natlib.govt.nz/parliamentary/appendix-to-the-journals-of-the-house-of-representatives/1935/I/1327?large_image=true	STATEMENT No. 18 Statement of Traffic and Revenue for each Station for the Year ended 31 March 1935
1936	53786	268		https://paperspast.natlib.govt.nz/parliamentary/appendix-to-the-journals-of-the-house-of-representatives/1936/I/1553?large_image=true	STATEMENT No. 18 Statement of Traffic and Revenue for each Station for the Year ended 31 March 1936
1937	65505	209		https://paperspast.natlib.govt.nz/parliamentary/appendix-to-the-journals-of-the-house-of-representatives/1937/I/1897?large_image=true	STATEMENT No. 18 Statement of Traffic and Revenue for each Station for the Year ended 31 March 1937
1938	65422	230		https://paperspast.natlib.govt.nz/parliamentary/appendix-to-the-journals-of-the-house-of-representatives/1938/I/1653?large_image=true	STATEMENT No. 18 Statement of Traffic and Revenue for each Station for the Year ended 31 March 1938
1939	60497	202		https://paperspast.natlib.govt.nz/parliamentary/appendix-to-the-journals-of-the-house-of-representatives/1939/I/1971?large_image=true	STATEMENT No. 18 Statement of Traffic and Revenue for each Station for the Year ended 31 March 1939
1940	60768	184		https://paperspast.natlib.govt.nz/parliamentary/appendix-to-the-journals-of-the-house-of-representatives/1940/I/1315?large_image=true	STATEMENT No. 18 Statement of Traffic and Revenue for each Station for the Year ended 31 March 1940
1941	67466	166	93	https://paperspast.natlib.govt.nz/parliamentary/appendix-to-the-journals-of-the-house-of-representatives/1941/I/1204?large_image=true	STATEMENT No. 18 Statement of Traffic and Revenue for each Station for the Year ended 31 March 1941
1942	84122	149		https://paperspast.natlib.govt.nz/parliamentary/appendix-to-the-journals-of-the-house-of-representatives/1942/I/652?large_image=true	STATEMENT No. 18 Statement of Traffic and Revenue for each Station for the Year ended 31 March 1942
1943	116843	190		https://paperspast.natlib.govt.nz/parliamentary/appendix-to-the-journals-of-the-house-of-representatives/1943/I/680?large_image=true	STATEMENT No. 18 Statement of Traffic and Revenue for each Station for the Year ended 31 March 1943
1944	108724	215		https://paperspast.natlib.govt.nz/parliamentary/appendix-to-the-journals-of-the-house-of-representatives/1944/I/896?large_image=true	STATEMENT No. 18 Statement of Traffic and Revenue for each Station for the Year ended 31 March 1944
1945	75484	226		https://paperspast.natlib.govt.nz/parliamentary/appendix-to-the-journals-of-the-house-of-representatives/1945/I/970?large_image=true	STATEMENT No. 18 Statement of Traffic and Revenue for each Station for the Year ended 31 March 1945
1946	82042	219		https://paperspast.natlib.govt.nz/parliamentary/appendix-to-the-journals-of-the-house-of-representatives/1946/I/1549?large_image=true	STATEMENT No. 18 Statement of Traffic and Revenue for each Station for the Year ended 31 March 1946
1947	61913	162		https://paperspast.natlib.govt.nz/parliamentary/appendix-to-the-journals-of-the-house-of-representatives/1947/I/2496?large_image=true	STATEMENT No. 18 Statement of Traffic and Revenue for each Station for the Year ended 31 March 1947
1948	53655	85		https://paperspast.natlib.govt.nz/parliamentary/appendix-to-the-journals-of-the-house-of-representatives/1948/I/2522?large_image=true	STATEMENT No. 18 Statement of Traffic and Revenue for each Station for the Year ended 31 March 1948
1949	44557	33		https://paperspast.natlib.govt.nz/parliamentary/appendix-to-the-journals-of-the-house-of-representatives/1949/I/2105?large_image=true	STATEMENT No. 18 Statement of Traffic and Revenue for each Station for the Year ended 31 March 1949
1950	44394	27		https://paperspast.natlib.govt.nz/parliamentary/appendix-to-the-journals-of-the-house-of-representatives/1950/I/2367?large_image=true	STATEMENT No. 18 Statement of Traffic and Revenue for each Station for the Year ended 31 March 1950

==== Goods ====
The goods business was as valuable to the railway as the passengers. For example, in 1921 passenger revenue was £50,417 (including £4,852 for parcels and luggage) and goods £50,605. In that year 21,433 tons of minerals, 31,137 tons of general goods, 8,373,600 superficial feet of timber and 304,233 sheep arrived at the station. Most of the sheep would have been destined for the freezing works, which had been built at Castlecliff in 1891.

By March 1878 the station had a goods shed. In 1879 Saunders reclaimed land and built a wharf and McLean built another goods shed. Cattle yards were added in 1880. In 1881 a verandah was added to the goods shed. In 1882 Freeman Jackson had a wool store built beside the station. In 1883 Alexander & McFarlane added to the goods shed for £431-19s-8d. Further improvements were made to the station yard in 1895. By 1896 there was a 180 ft (55 m) x 42 ft (13 m) goods shed, loading bank, cattle and sheep yards, hand crane, coal yard and weighbridge. In 1899 several improvements were planned, including a new engine shed and reclamation of the area above the half tide wall, later marked as Government Reclamation on a plan of about 1905. The wharf was extended by 625 ft (191 m) in 1909. By 1914 there was a wagon repair shed. In 1911 the yard was lit and in 1930 electric light was put in the wharf shed.

=== Decline and moves ===
From 1908 the city trams travelled to Aramoho in 17 minutes and, from 17 October 1912, served Castlecliff. Buses began running to New Plymouth in 1921 and to Wellington in 1925. In 1934 they were bought by Railways Road Motor Service, whose buses ran to Wellington in 4½ to 5 hours; by comparison, from 1933, a 2pm train from Wellington reached Whanganui at 9.12pm, with a change at Palmerston North. On 1 January 1956 the Town Wharf was closed due to competition from Castlecliff, a proposal which had been made as early as 1932. Large crowds greeted a British rugby team when they arrived at the station in August 1959, though regular passenger services had ended on 3 May 1959. In 1959 part of the old wharf shed was demolished and the rest in 1963. In 1961 the station platform was reduced. On Taupo Quay in 1962 a new 250 ft (76 m) x 50 ft (15 m) good shed, 2 storey, 50 ft (15 m) x 40 ft (12 m) goods office and a loading bank were built. In 1963 the 1878 goods office was demolished, 3 floodlight towers were built, 2 of them 120 ft (37 m) high and the other 80 ft (24 m).

A 16,500 ft^{2} (1,530 m^{2}) district office opened on 1 November 1971 on Taupo Quay, costing $262,989. By August 1976 a new gantry was in use for lifting bulk flour containers and on 7 April 1983 a new Road Services terminal opened. In 1987 the locomotive depot and car & wagon block were demolished and replaced in 1988 by an $8,000 fuel point at East Town. By October 1989 the station, platform and sidings had been removed, replaced by a new site further west on Taupo Quay.

A container terminal replaced Taupo Quay in 2010, linking with Port Taranaki and Centreport. It was formally opened in 2015 and is at 53 Gilberd Street, Castlecliff. The other main traffic is logs. Taupo Quay was redeveloped in the 1990s with shopping, parking and open spaces.
