= Aramoho railway station =

Railway station in Whanganui, New Zealand

Aramoho

General information
- Location: Aramoho, Whanganui; New Zealand
- Coordinates: 39°54′19.9″S 175°03′18.0″E
- Elevation: 20 metres (66 ft)
- System: New Zealand Government Railways (NZGR); Regional rail
- Lines: Marton–New Plymouth line formerly junction with the Aramoho–Wanganui Branch (later the Wanganui Branch)
- Distance: 43.13 kilometres (26.80 mi) from Marton
- Platforms: Island platform.
- Tracks: Multiple loops, backshunts and sidings at its peak

Construction
- Structure type: At-grade
- Parking: Yes

History
- Opened: 17 May 1877; 149 years ago
- Closed: Passenger: 31 May 1976; 50 years ago (Note: Rail Heritage Trust dates Aramoho's passenger closure to 31 May 1976, a date shared with several smaller Marton–New Plymouth Line stops. Contemporary service documentation and published accounts of the Wellington–New Plymouth "Blue Streak" railcar describe Aramoho as an active, scheduled stop through to that service's final withdrawal on 30 July 1977. This discrepancy is of particular significance since Aramoho was the sole passenger station for Whanganui from 1959. This clash of dates is presented as an unresolved clash of sources.); Goods: 22 September 1986; 40 years ago
- Rebuilt: 1899–1900 (after fire)
- Former names: Aramoho Junction (c. 1877)
Location
Notes
- Previous Station (MNPL): East Town Station; Next Station (MNPL): Westmere Station; Next Station (Wanganui Branch): St John's Station

Aramoho railway station is a railway station in the suburb of Aramoho in Whanganui, New Zealand, on the Marton–New Plymouth line. The station is the junction with the Wanganui Branch railway line and for many years was a connecting point between mainline trains and branch trains to the city station. The station handled substantial goods, livestock and refreshment-room traffic through the late nineteenth and twentieth centuries.

== History ==
=== Establishment (1877–1880s) ===
Construction contracts for a station at Aramoho were let in May 1877, covering a seventh-class station building and a stationmaster's house (both to Alexander & McFarlane) and a water supply (to F. M. Chalmers). The Aramoho–Turakina section opened for traffic on 17 May 1877, and the Kai Iwi section followed on 28 June 1879. The short branch connecting Aramoho with Whanganui town itself opened on 21 January 1878, with the line through to Marton completed the following month. Land for the enlarged junction was taken from the township of Elderslie in September 1878.

The original footbridge over the adjacent Whanganui River rail bridge lacked a proper footpath, and in 1879 a correspondent complained that schoolchildren crossed it daily at risk of falling into the river below. A siding to a nearby ballast pit was proposed in 1879 and the land purchased the following year.

By the 1880s and 1890s, Aramoho's facilities had grown substantially, being reclassified upward from its original seventh-class status to a fourth-class, then "special" accommodation station, reflecting steadily increasing goods, livestock and passenger traffic.

=== The 1899 fire and rebuilding ===
On the morning of 15 April 1899, during a strong gale, the Aramoho station and its refreshment room were destroyed by fire; the cause was never established. Stationmaster Walsh saved the current cash, tickets and documents. The refreshment room, then run by Mrs Jubal Fleming, was insured for £150, with the loss estimated at £100 above that cover. Temporary buildings, including a waiting shed and office, were in place within days. Timber for the replacement building had been ordered by July 1899, and by June 1899 approval had been given for a substantial new station incorporating offices, a waiting room, an elevated signal room and refreshment rooms, with the associated yard and platform alterations estimated at £1,215. The 1899 Cyclopedia of New Zealand entry for Wanganui describes the rebuilt station in some detail: a wooden building with a stationmaster's/booking office, luggage and porters' rooms, a ticket vestibule, a ladies' waiting room, a refreshment room with a bar and a separate ladies' luncheon room, a goods shed, and a triangular platform some 100 yards long, laid with shell ballast, busiest on the "through mail days" of Tuesdays and Fridays.

=== The naming dispute ===
Because the city station was located on the branch railway into Whanganui, through mail trains and expresses served the city primarily via Aramoho Station, relying on a connecting service called The Ferry for the final few kilometres into Whanganui itself. This arrangement was a long-running civic grievance. At a special Chamber of Commerce meeting in April 1899, held in the wake of the fire that had just destroyed the Aramoho station, a deputation pressed the Premier, Richard Seddon, to have express trains run directly into Whanganui rather than delaying passengers at Aramoho for some twenty minutes; Seddon undertook only to raise the matter with the Minister of Railways. No change resulted, and the arrangement persisted for decades.

A related and even longer-running campaign sought to rename "Aramoho" station to "Wanganui Junction," on the grounds that visitors passing through failed to realise they were at Whanganui at all. The suggestion was first raised in 1895, and recurred in 1899, 1907, 1923, and 1937, when a Wanganui newspaper editorial, reprinted in the Waikato Times, wryly dubbed the station "Sacred Aramoho" and called it "the forgotten child of an Administration which cannot make up its mind." The most sustained push came in 1943 to 1944, when the Wanganui City Council repeatedly petitioned the Minister of Railways, the Hon. R. Semple, only to be refused each time. Semple's stated reasoning was that a change would confuse consignors and cause mail addressed to the separate Aramoho post office to go astray, since that office's name would not be changed to match. Councillor S. J. Harris called the Minister's reasoning "the weakest reply I have ever heard." The station's name was never changed.

=== Signalling, sidings and yard expansion (1900s–1930s) ===
An automatic telephone system was installed at the main Wanganui station in 1937, with a direct line to Aramoho planned to follow. Earlier calls for a public telephone specifically at Aramoho, separate from the internal departmental line already connecting it to the Wanganui station, had been made as early as 1906.

By 1906 the siding on the goods-shed side of the yard was found too short to allow engines to be changed on busy mail days, and from 1907 the junction points were interlocked, repositioned so that trains could stand on each platform simultaneously while another approached down the grade from Westmere. Yard capacity was expanded repeatedly over the following decades: stockyards were built in 1916, the same year a siding lease was granted to the Wanganui Co-operative Dairy Company; Signals Branch offices, stores and workshops were built in 1919; and in 1925–26 a further £1,165 was authorised for additional sidings, explicitly intended to allow through wagons to be held at Aramoho rather than brought into the Wanganui goods yard. New sidings on the western side of the yard, adjacent to the Woollen Mills siding, were built in 1926 to relieve congestion, with a corresponding benefit for the Wanganui yard. Yard enlargement was flagged as urgently needed again in 1915 owing to increasing traffic.

Passenger amenities improved in parallel: platform seating was approved in 1929, as was a motor-car parking area the same year, following requests from the Wanganui Automobile Association. The station was reported to present "an unusually busy appearance" over Easter 1929 as holiday traffic strained rolling stock across the North Island. Repeated civic requests to beautify the station's approaches and surrounds were made through the 1930s, with the Railways Department contributing funds and land on a peppercorn rental toward gardens on several occasions.

=== Refreshment rooms ===
The Aramoho refreshment rooms existed largely because of the "through trains" arrangement described above: Wanganui-bound passengers had a scheduled wait of roughly twenty minutes at Aramoho while connections were made, and the refreshment rooms gave them somewhere to spend it. Their establishment was not uncontroversial: in 1889, Aramoho residents petitioned the Railway Commissioners against granting a liquor licence for the rooms, given their proximity, within a chain and a half, to the existing Aramoho Hotel, and the recent local-option poll result against further licences. The sale of liquor at the rooms was discontinued from April 1905, and the Railways Department took over direct control of the rooms in 1920. The rooms saw heavy use on busy days: a 1935 Wellington–New Plymouth excursion train reportedly "ate out" the Aramoho refreshment rooms entirely, requiring stocks to be replenished mid-journey, and a 1940 troop special travelling to Trentham camp similarly ate the rooms out of pies before reaching Marton. The refreshment room closed in 1967.

=== Level crossing signal (1927) ===
An automatic level-crossing signal, described in the press only as a "wig-wag," was delivered to the Aramoho yard by March 1927 but sat uninstalled for some weeks, prompting a councillor to complain it would "grow fibrous roots" before the Railways Department acted. It was in operation by April 1927, when a further council discussion recorded that the device had drawn curious reactions from local residents unfamiliar with it, including members of Aramoho's Chinese community. (Note: It is unclear from sources whether this was a New Zealand-designed Pearson Automatic Level Crossing signal or an American-designed wigwag, as both were being trialled by the railways at the time.)

=== Industries served ===
Aramoho's yard served a substantial cluster of local industry via private sidings, including a woollen mill, the Wanganui Co-operative Dairy Company, and Mitchell & Co.'s freezing works, which also generated dedicated van traffic for frozen meat to Wanganui. A private siding was granted to Pollock & Young as early as 1878, with further applications from H. Pinches (1893) and Hendrick Brothers (1898). By the 1920s a chemical/fertiliser works at Aramoho (Kempthorne, Prosser & Co. Ltd) was generating substantial phosphate and rock traffic from Castlecliff Wharf, and by 1946 this works alone accounted for the bulk of the station's outward freight tonnage (see Wartime traffic, below).

=== Wartime traffic ===
Aramoho station was a departure point for several troop drafts during the Second World War, with large public farewells recorded in 1939 and 1940. Wartime travel restrictions produced a sharp decline in rail passenger numbers at both Wanganui and Aramoho, with passenger journeys at Aramoho falling from 3,409 to 1,412 over one four-week period in early 1944, even as road-service passenger numbers rose roughly tenfold over the same period; goods traffic, by contrast, remained close to normal.

Detailed comparative figures survive for several years. In the year to March 1940, Aramoho recorded 793 first-class and 21,650 second-class passenger journeys (against 60,763 total passengers at the main Wanganui station), generating £5,155 in passenger revenue. In the year to March 1946, Aramoho handled 64,736 tons of outward general freight, an increase of over 15,000 tons on the previous year, the bulk of it fertiliser railed from the chemical works' private siding; the same year recorded 24,165 passenger journeys, 34,399 sheep and 7,469 cattle carried, and total station revenue of £44,128.

=== Incidents ===
On 1 June 1935, a shunting engine derailed at nearby East Town, blocking the main line for several hours; passengers on the delayed New Plymouth–Wellington express were walked across the bridge to join a relief train. Later the same year, stationmaster K. C. Wells suffered facial and eye injuries when a wagonload of lime exploded, apparently after water contacted the lime, as he inspected it in the yard. In March 1939, a burglar broke into the station office and stole small amounts of cash from a tin and a drawer, unsuccessfully attempting to open the safe. A dense-fog head-on collision between a mixed train and a stationary goods train occurred just outside the station in February 1945, blocking both the main line and the branch route to the river bridge for several hours. A level-crossing collision at the nearby Kaikokopu Road crossing in December 1956 injured two young occupants of a car struck shortly after a train left the station. In February 1969, an unattended maintenance trolley, reportedly moved onto the line by children, was struck by the New Plymouth–Wellington railcar shortly before its scheduled 6 p.m. departure from Aramoho, causing minor damage and a short delay. A major derailment in April 1970, involving more than forty wagons and two D_{A} class locomotives, blocked the Wellington–New Plymouth line for around eighteen hours.

== The Aramoho railway bridge ==
The rail bridge over the Whanganui River adjacent to the station was, from its earliest years, a source of recurring friction between the Railways Department and local civic bodies over responsibility for its upkeep and public use as a footbridge. Disputes were recorded over lighting costs in 1915 and repair cost allocation in 1904. Flooding in September 1918 caused significant damage to the bridge as part of a wider disruption to the regional rail network. Renovation of the wooden structure was under way through much of 1933. By 1960, the original wooden bridge was replaced with a steel structure using an unusual method: new steel spans were fabricated at Woburn and jacked into position one at a time above the existing wooden spans, which were then cut away and lowered for dismantling once each replacement was secured. The bridge is also reported to have sustained damage in the 1897 Wanganui earthquake, with the steel replacement completed in 1962.

== Decline and closure ==
The refreshment room closed in 1967 (see above). The station's engine reversing (turning) triangle was next removed in 1970. Rail Heritage Trust records give 31 May 1976 as the date Aramoho's passenger service ceased, and 22 September 1986 as the date the station closed to all remaining (goods) traffic. However, this passenger-closure date conflicts with other evidence. The "Blue Streak" railcar service served the station as a scheduled stop with a timed departure in both directions, and this service ran until 30 July 1977.

During the late 1980s, both signal boxes, the goods shed, and most yard trackage were removed, as was the direct connection from the Wanganui Branch north towards Taranaki. The main line was realigned through what had been the branch side of the station. The station building was removed in the late 1990s, with the stationmaster's office/signal box section now held by SteamRail Wanganui, received into their collection in December 1997.

== Today ==
Aramoho retains a small KiwiRail depot along with an unused siding to the Ravensdown fertiliser site. The site, other than the single-track Marton–New Plymouth line for freight traffic, is otherwise empty.

== Stationmasters ==
Below is a partial list of stationmasters over the years.

Name	Tenure (known)	Notes
Walsh	fl. 1899	In post at the time of the 1899 fire; saved cash, tickets and documents.
Symmonds	fl. 1908	Thanked, with staff, for facilitating gravel-truck despatch.
Davidson	by 1912	Presided over a staff farewell for shunter Robert Dreaver.
K. C. Wells	1935	Injured in the lime-wagon explosion (see Incidents).
A. H. McKay	Sept 1939 to July 1943	Transferred to Putaruru; previously senior clerk at Whangārei.
R. A. Pepperell	from July 1943	Previously officer in charge, Port Ahuriri.
C. B. Weenink	Sept 1945 to May 1947	Retired after 40 years' service; previously stationmaster at Turakina, Ōtaki, Papakura and Hastings.
L. D. McKenzie	from May 1947	Previously stationmaster, Featherston.
G. Carline	to Aug 1948	Promoted to Commercial Agent, Wanganui railway district.
S. Jermy	Aug 1948 (acting)	Previously senior goods clerk, Wanganui.
