= Ohakune railway station =

Railway station in New Zealand

Ohakune
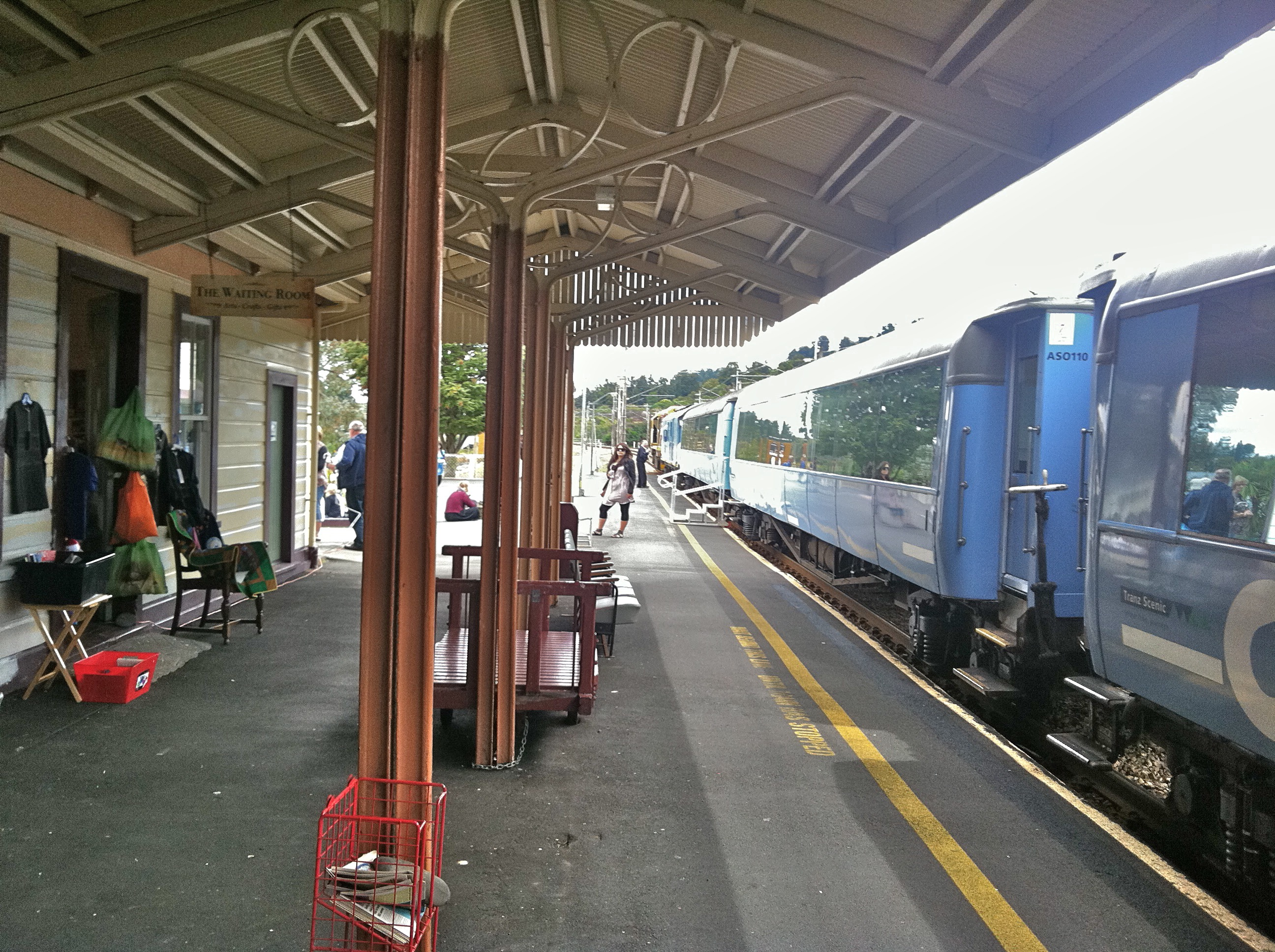
- Overlander at Ohakune in 2012. The low platform resulted in use of steps to ease access to coaches.

General information
- Location: Thames Street, Ohakune; New Zealand
- Coordinates: 39°24′10″S 175°24′59″E
- Elevation: 618 m (2,028 ft)
- Owner: KiwiRail
- Line: North Island Main Trunk
- Distance: Wellington 317.09 km (197.03 mi)
- Connections: Raetihi Branch (closed 1968)

Construction
- Parking: Yes

History
- Opened: 7 March 1908 (goods); 15 February 1909 (passenger)
- Electrified: 25 kV 50 Hz AC June 1988
- Former names: Ohakune Junction in working timetables 1917–1968

Services
Preceding station	Great Journeys New Zealand	Following station
National Park towards Auckland Strand	Northern Explorer	Palmerston North towards Wellington

Other services
Preceding station	Historical railways	Following station
Horopito; Line open station closed 10.16 km (6.31 mi)	North Island Main Trunk; KiwiRail	Rangataua; Line open station closed 4.43 km (2.75 mi)
Terminus	Raetihi Branch; New Zealand Railways Department	Rochfort; Line closed station closed 3.24 km (2.01 mi)

Heritage New Zealand – Category 2
- Designated: 20 February 2009
- Reference no.: 7790
Location

Ohakune railway station is a station on the North Island Main Trunk (NIMT), which serves the town of Ohakune in the Manawatū-Whanganui region of New Zealand. It is served by KiwiRail's Northern Explorer long distance train between Wellington and Auckland. It was called Ohakune Junction from 10 August 1926 until Raetihi Branch closed in January 1968, to avoid confusion with Ohakune Town station on that branch. It was the second highest operating railway station in New Zealand, after National Park.

When the Overlander was replaced by the Northern Explorer in 2012, the service to Ohakune was reduced to one train a day on six days a week. Scheduled services to Ohakune were suspended from December 2021 to 25 September 2022.

== History ==
The Class B station was built about 1908 and was important in the growth of Ohakune. Trains calling have included The Overlander, Blue Streak, Scenic Daylight, Daylight Limited, Northerner, Silver Star and Night Limited.

Surveying for the route between Hīhītahi and Piriaka began in 1894. The first trains reached Ohakune when the railhead was extended from Rangataua on Tuesday 5 November 1907, when Public Works Department (PWD) and New Zealand Railways Department (NZR) made arrangements for both passenger and goods traffic, At that stage the station was described as 100 ft (30 m) long on a 300 ft (91 m) platform. However, goods traffic between Mataroa and Ohakune didn't begin until Saturday 7 March 1908. Initial plans were for NZR to take over from PWD in June 1908, but NZR reported on 25 September 1908, "Obtaining possession of office and other buildings." In July newspapers said the station and railway houses were still bring built. Although the rails completing the NIMT were laid on 3 August 1908, they said the yard at Ohakune wasn't complete and there was still no platform in November.

On Monday 9 November 1908, a stationmaster was appointed and the first public train from Wellington to Auckland ran, with passengers staying overnight in Ohakune from 8pm to 6am. In January 1909 the General Manager gave permission for passengers to sleep in the trains, owing to a lack of accommodation in the town. On 20 November 1908 NZR sent a note to PWD asking for expedition in completing the platform, as it was, "exceedingly inconvenient and dangerous for passengers landing in the dark". However, an NZR report on 20 March 1908 described a 300 ft (91 m) by 20 ft (6.1 m) platform, loading bank, cattle loading and discharging yards, 40 ft (12 m) by 30 ft (9.1 m) goods shed with verandah, urinals, 2x 4,000 gallon water tanks, 120 ft (37 m) by 35 ft (11 m) engine shed double-stall, coal store, 55 ft (17 m) turntable and passing loop for 80 wagons. NZR took over from PWD on 14 February 1909, from Erua, via Ohakune to Waiouru.

The first through expresses began on 14 February 1909 and stopped at Ohakune. By July 1909 a footwarmer house had been built by PWD for £54.4.4 and there was a bookstall, a special station building, with District Engineer's office, luggage, stationmaster's, lobby, and ladies rooms, a lengthened and asphalted platform, cart approach, goods shed, loading bank, cattle and sheep yards, crane, water service, coal accommodation, engine turntable, engine shed, stationmaster's house and urinal. In 1910 the goods shed was extended to 80 ft (24 m) by 44 ft (13 m).

Ohakune was one of the stations for which annual returns of traffic were published. For example, in 1923, Ohakune issued 58,001 tickets, plus 26 season tickets, and 280,437 board feet (661.76 m^{3}), or superficial feet of timber were railed from Ohakune, well above other stations for timber exports at that time.

On 12 April 1905, the engine shed burnt down. A new 120 ft (37 m) by 35 ft (11 m) shed could take five locomotives. In 1910 an ash pit was added. On 7 December 1923 that shed was destroyed by fire. In 1929 the 55 ft (17 m) turntable was sent to Huntly and replaced by a 70 ft (21 m) turntable for £1800. By 1960 the depot was only being used by Raetihi branch engines. It again caught fire on 17 February 1967.

Railway houses were built in 1905, 1906, 1907, 1908, 1912, 1914 and 1965 and a hostel for female refreshment room staff on Tyne Road in 1940.

From December 1966, Centralised Traffic Control replaced tablet signalling.
