= Karere railway station =

Railway station in Palmerston North, New Zealand

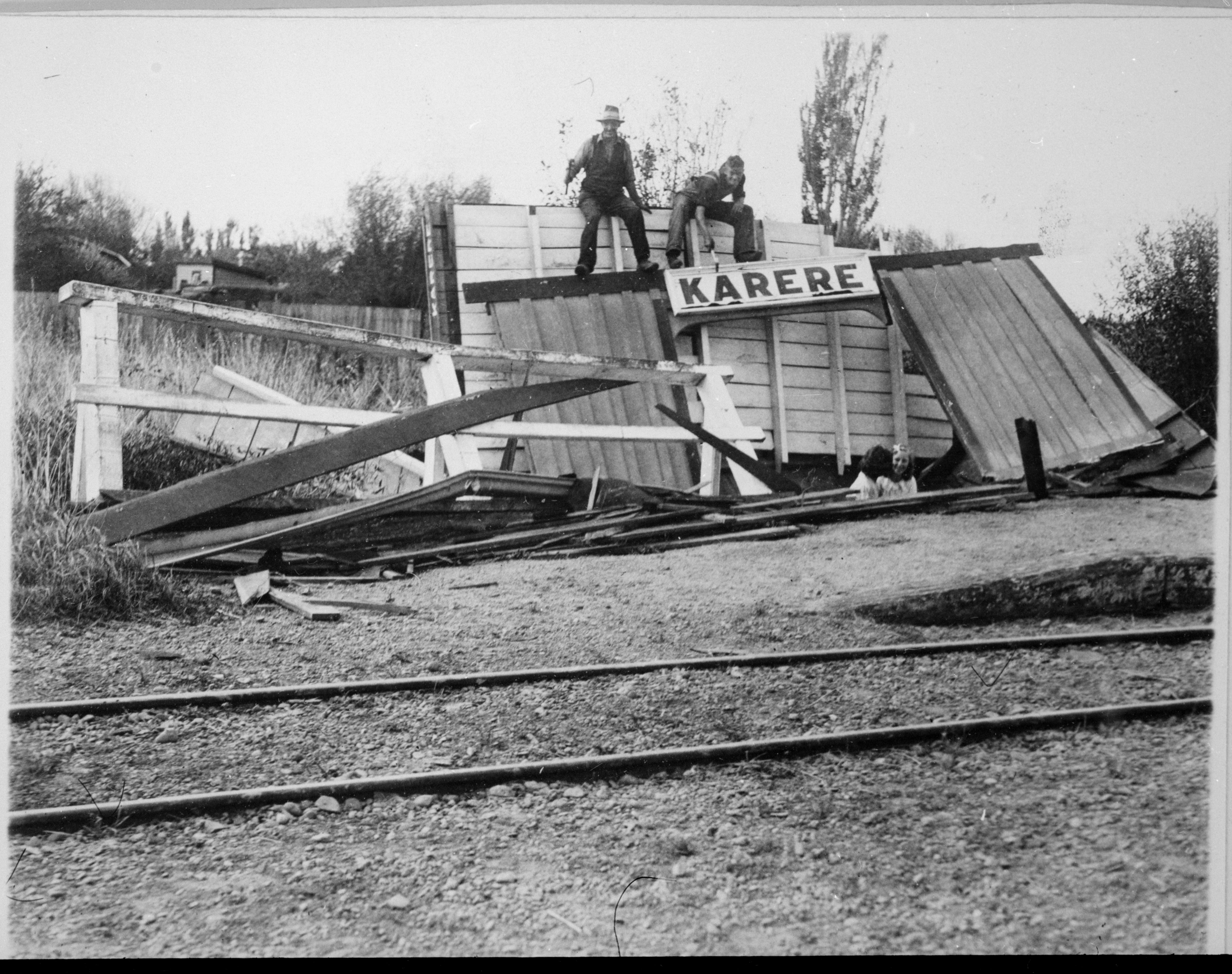
- The station was destroyed in the 1936 cyclone.

General information
- Location: New Zealand
- Coordinates: 40°23′31″S 175°31′27″E
- System: Passenger and Cargo Rail Station
- Line: Foxton Branch

Construction
- Structure type: Passenger shelter (destroyed in 1936), cattle yards

History
- Opened: 1873
- Closed: 1959
Location

Karere Railway Station was a passenger and freight station on the Foxton Branch Line south of Palmerston North in the Manawatū region of New Zealand. It served the branch line from 1873 until the line's closure in 1959.

The station was important for the district's growing industries, especially those of forestry and flax. Local goods were transported from the station to Foxton's port where they were shipped to a larger centre. The station's freight facilities were expanded in 1930 to meet the area's growing demand for transport. These improvements included accommodations for livestock transportation.

In 1936 the station's passenger shelter was destroyed by a cyclone and not rebuilt. The cyclone also damaged the Terrace End Railway Station in Palmerston North.

The Foxton branchline was closed and ripped up in 1959. The concrete station platform is one of the few remains of the line, and can be found along State Highway 58. The station's original sign is mounted to the station facing the road.
