= Taonui Branch =

Railway line in New Zealand

Map

The Taonui Branch was a minor branch line railway in New Zealand's national network. Located in the Manawatū District of the North Island, it opened in 1879 and operated until 1895.

== Construction ==
In the late 1870s, sleepers were needed for the Foxton & Wanganui Railway (later the Wanganui Branch, the now-closed Foxton Branch, and parts of the North Island Main Trunk railway and Marton - New Plymouth Line). Accordingly, a 3.5 km (2.2 mi) line was constructed from Taonui, near Feilding, in a northeasterly direction towards Colyton through a stand of totara trees. It was laid with light 30lb rails and opened on 17 November 1879 It was overseen by three separate authorities: initially the Railways Commissioners; then the Public Works Department (PWD) from 20 April 1881; and finally the New Zealand Railways Department from the start of July 1882.

== Operation ==
Despite being officially designated a branch line, it was little more than an elongated siding. No stations were located on the line and it never carried passengers. In November 1879 it was recommended that the line be worked by the Railways Department and from January 1880 their engine worked the line to the sawmill. In March 1880 it was proposed to work line with horses to save money. By 1882 PWD hired horses to haul empty wagons up the line, which, when loaded, ran down by gravity, using just their brakes, to the main line. An August 1893 report said revenue for the last three months was only five shillings, as the sawmills had all moved. From January to April 1895 the only traffic was 29 wagons of sawn timber, 4 of firewood, and 1 of goods.

The line was not just used to provide the national railways with sleepers; some private timber companies also offered traffic. Henry Adsett had a mill along the line and became a farmer once the trees had been felled. However, this traffic was not significant and closing the line was proposed by 1893. Closure came on 14 August 1895 and the rails were gone by February the next year. Rails of 30, 40 and 52lb were recovered. Closure was authorised by the Taonui Branch Railway Act 1894, which said the line opened in June 1879.

== Today ==
No earthworks at all were required for the line and no traces of the formation survive. The only extant remnant is the station building from the junction in Taonui. It closed in the 1960s and was subsequently relocated to a farmer's paddock near its original location. A few decades later, the farmer donated it to the Feilding and District Steam Rail Society. It has now been restored and included as part of the society's depot in Feilding, and the restoration work earned the society a Certificate of Merit from the Rail Heritage Trust of New Zealand, awarded on 2 June 2002.

== See also ==
- Marton–New Plymouth line
- North Island Main Trunk
- Castlecliff Branch
- Foxton Branch
- Raetihi Branch
- Wanganui Branch
