= Raetihi Branch =

Branch line railway

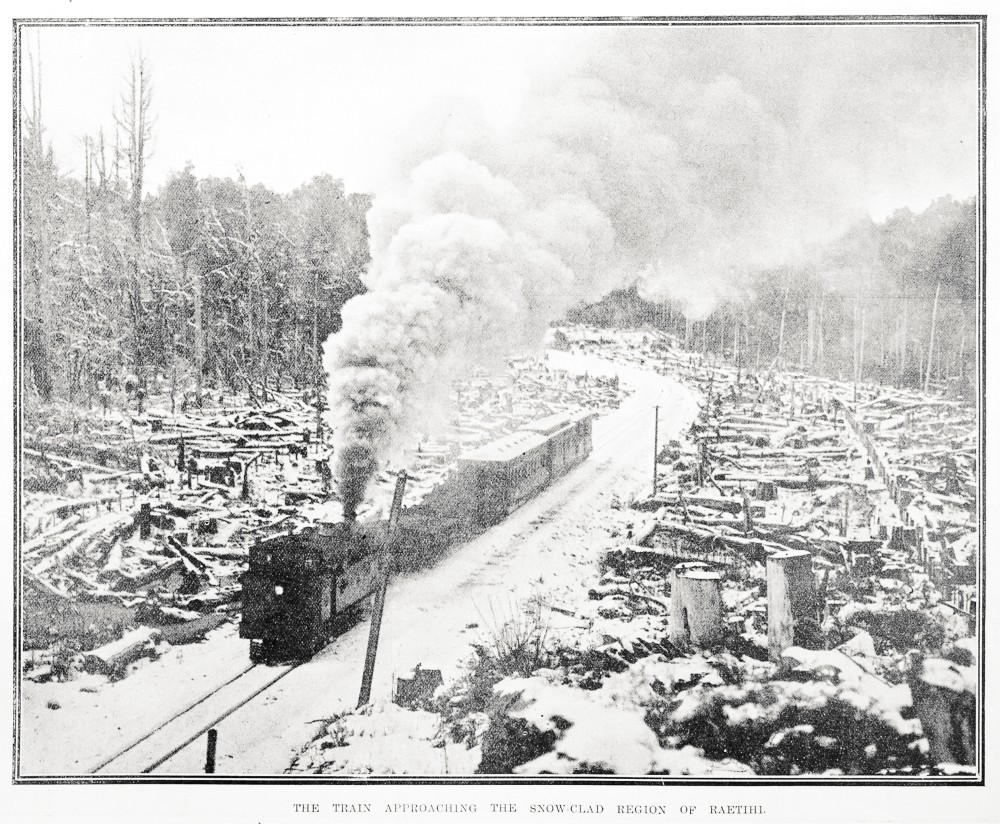
- Raetihi branch 1918

Overview
- Status: Closed
- Termini: Ohakune; Raetihi

Service
- Operator(s): New Zealand Railways Department

History
- Opened: 18 December 1917
- Closed: 1 January 1968

Technical
- Line length: 13.7 km (8.5 mi)
- Number of tracks: Single
- Character: Rural
- Track gauge: 1,067 mm (3 ft 6 in)

Map

The Raetihi Branch was a branch line railway in the central North Island of New Zealand. It formed part of New Zealand's national rail network and operated from 18 December 1917 until 1 January 1968.

== Construction ==
A combination of political pressure and the economic potential of the forestry in the Raetihi area motivated the construction of this line. A start on a tramway from Raetihi to Rangataua seems to have been made in 1908, with some of the route cleared and rails put in place. In 1911, the government granted approval to construct the line, with the line intended to diverge from the North Island Main Trunk in Rangataua. A proposal to electrify the line was investigated by the government's electrical engineer in 1911. The Minister of Public Works (R. McKenzie) turned the first sod, beside the railway at Ohakune, on Monday, 19 February 1912, when 20 workers were about to start building the line. However, due to budget constraints construction did not commence until late in 1913, when the site of the junction was changed to Ohakune. The change required redesign of the 2 mi (3.2 km) closest to the North Island Main Trunk. The outbreak of World War I a year later caused delays in both supplies and finding available manpower; nonetheless, work progressed steadily through the war years, and the line was opened on 18 December 1917. Despite proclamations that it was the start of a new route to Whanganui, the line was never extended beyond Raetihi.

== Stations ==
The following stations were located on the Raetihi Branch (in brackets is the distance from Ohakune):

- Rochfort (3 km) - shelter shed, platform, 20 ft (6.1 m) by 30 ft (9.1 m) goods shed, loading bank, passing loop and, from 1924, telephone
- Makaranui (8 km) - from 1907 to 1914 referred to as Toanui
- Pakihi (11 km)
- Raetihi (13 km)

== Operation ==
The line fulfilled its intended purpose to carry timber to markets further afield, with large quantities railed in the branch's early years. As the forests were removed, land became available for farming and agriculture became important to the line's economic fortunes. Livestock was of particular seasonal importance. Passenger trains did not operate, but passenger carriages were attached to goods services to create what were known as mixed trains. A 1930 Royal Commission into the state of New Zealand's railway network recommended the termination of passenger services, but this was not actually done until 16 December 1951. Another Royal Commission had taken place in 1950, but the line had remarkably been excluded.

By the late 1950s, timber traffic had declined sharply, and road transport was creating strong competition for the branch line. From 1965, speed was limited to 15 mph (24 km/h), because maintenance on the line had been deferred; it was not seen as a necessity or financially justifiable, but as repairs became more necessary, the line's future was put under review in 1967. Financial losses had been steadily increasing, and the review called for closure of the line. Accordingly, this took place on 1 January 1968.

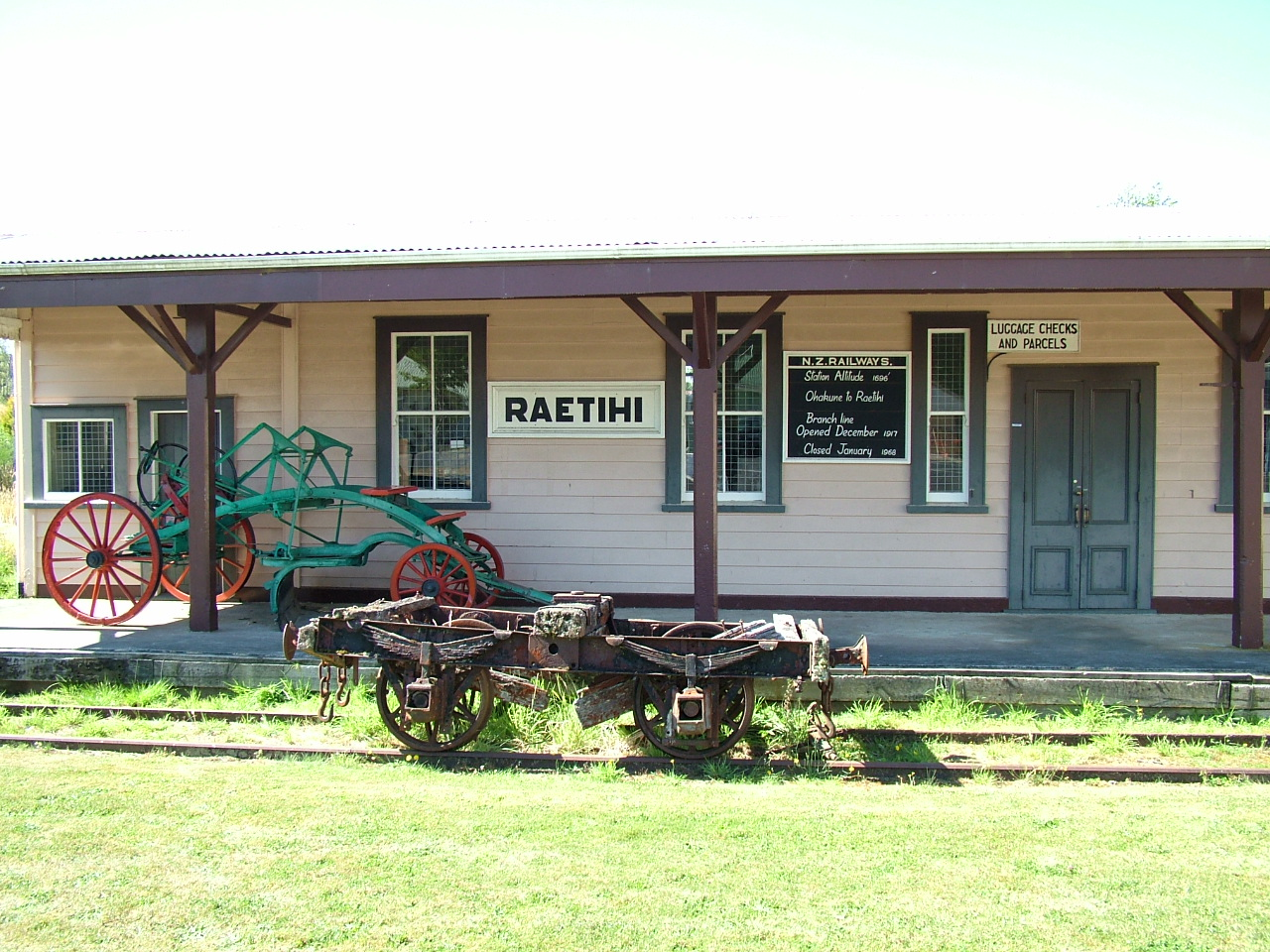
Waimarino museum

== Today ==
Two significant relics from the Raetihi Branch still exist. The Raetihi station building has been relocated from its old site to a new location in the town and has been restored as part of the Waimarino Museum. At the other end of the branch, near Ohakune's famous big carrot, an old truss bridge remains in place. For the rest of the line's length, notable remnants are absent, but the formation can be sighted at points, especially where embankments or cuttings were required.

== See also ==
- Marton-New Plymouth Line
- North Island Main Trunk
- Castlecliff Branch
- Foxton Branch
- Toanui Branch
- Whanganui Branch
