= Foxton Branch =

Railway line in New Zealand

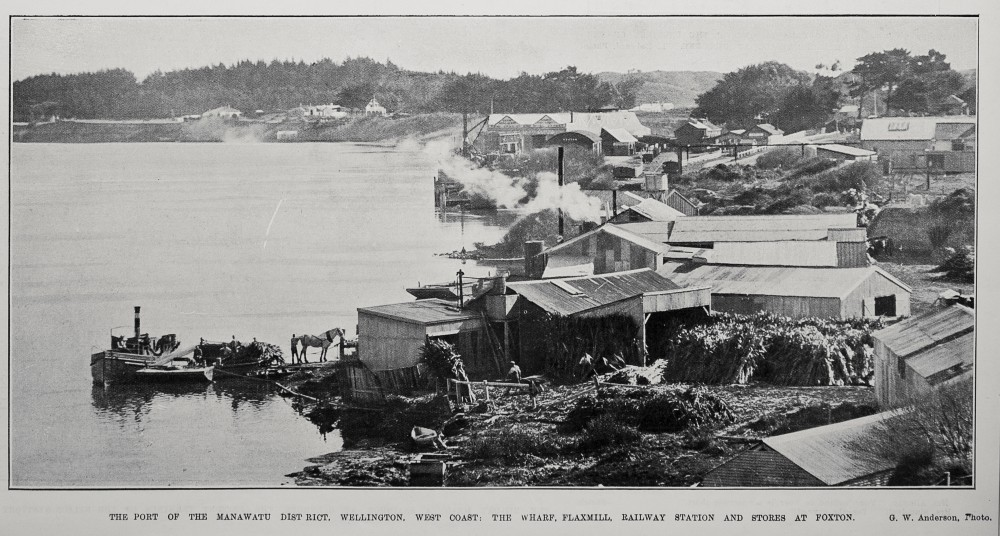
- 1912 Foxton railway station, wharf, stores and flaxmill

Overview
- Locale: New Zealand
- Termini: Palmerston North; Foxton
- Stations: 8

History
- Commenced: 1871
- Opened: 27 April 1876
- Closed: 18 July 1959

Technical
- Line length: 40 km (25 mi)

Map

The Foxton Branch was a railway line in New Zealand. It began life as a tramway, reopened as a railway on 27 April 1876, and operated until 18 July 1959. At Himatangi there was a junction with the Sanson Tramway, a line operated by the Manawatu County Council that was never upgraded to the status of a railway.

== Construction ==
At the mouth of the Manawatū River, the settlement of Foxton was seen in the 1860s as a possible port for the Manawatu region. Roads often became treacherous and impassable in bad weather, and as the Manawatū River was not navigable far inland, a more dependable route than the roads was necessary so that the region could receive imports and export its products, particularly timber. Due to poor financial conditions at the time, a tramway built with wooden rails rather than a railway was proposed in 1865 as a cost-effective mode of transport. Not even this was affordable at the time, and it was not until Julius Vogel announced his "Great Public Works" policy in 1870 that construction was finally approved.

As planned in 1865, the line was built as a wooden-railed tramway, with construction commencing in 1871. On 20 August 1872, a steam locomotive constructed by the Dunedin firm of Messrs R. S. Sparrow and Co. was delivered and operated on the completed portion of tramway; this was the first New Zealand-built locomotive to run.

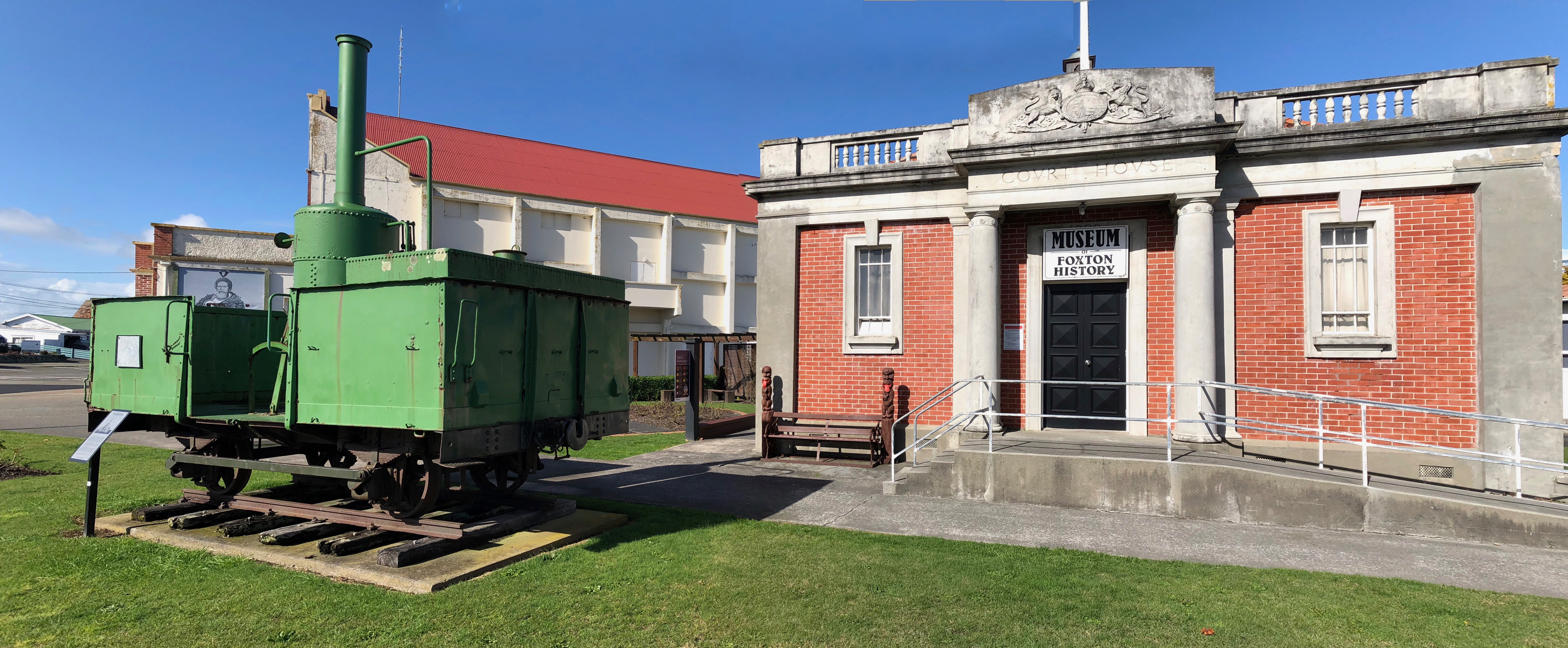
1994 replica of 1872 NZR Palmerston locomotive was built on a 1931 LA6 four-wheel wagon and is outside Foxton's Court House Museum, as seen in 2018

The line was completed to Palmerston North on 25 July 1873, a distance of 40 kilometres, and soon proposals were made to extend it to Wanganui. By 1874 the inadequacies of wooden rails were becoming apparent, and after an attempt at relaying the line with iron rails in February 1875 did not provide the durability required, the decision was made to relay the line with steel rails to railway standards. The land through which the line ran was generally flat, with the Oroua River the only serious obstacle. It was crossed with a 56-metre-long (184 ft) bridge. The line was formally re-opened as a railway on 27 April 1876.

== Connections ==
In 1885, the Sanson Tramway connected to the branch at Himatangi. The tramway closed in 1945.

In 1886 the Wellington and Manawatu Railway Company (W&MR), the private company established to build the "West Coast" Wellington–Manawatu Line due to the government's inaction, opened from Wellington to the Foxton line at Longburn, near Palmerston North. The government's original plan had been to extend the Foxton line down to Wellington, but the W&MR announced in 1881 that it would follow the most direct route to Palmerston North, bypassing Foxton. The Foxton line effectively became a branch line from Longburn, though it remained the southern terminus of the government railway until 1908 when the WM&R was purchased and incorporated in the North Island Main Trunk railway linking Wellington and Auckland.

== Stations ==
The following stations were on the Foxton Branch, with the distance from the junction at Longburn in brackets:

- Karere (2 km)
- Tiakitahuna (4 km - Ekatahuna until October 1878)
- Rangitane (8 km)
- Rangiotu (10 km - Oroua Bridge until 11 December 1910)
- Bainesse (15 km)
- Himatangi (22 km - Carnarvon until 1 August 1901)
- Motuiti (27 km - also Motuiti Pah Siding until 1876)
- Foxton (31 km - 1876-1881 in Main Street by the Post Office, 1881-1888 new station at wharf, 1888-1902 following a fire, re-using old station, which had been moved to wharf, 1903-1959, following another fire, station similar to that of 1881, though reduced in size from 1947)

== Operation ==
The line was very important for its first 12 years. Northbound freight and passengers from Wellington came up the west coast via ship and transferred to the railway in Foxton, and the town was served by express trains. When the WMR's line opened, traffic to Foxton dropped so markedly that services were slashed to run on alternate days, though daily trains were later restored. Passenger ships between Wellington and Foxton disappeared overnight. Most freight also used the new line, but the government railways did not wish to utilise a competitor's service and continued to ship railway coal in via Foxton instead of using W&MR. The flax trade in the region also continued to use Foxton as a harbour and provided traffic for the line.

In 1903 a mixed train ran daily between Foxton and Palmerston North, and it was augmented by a passenger train to and from Palmerston North three times a week. In 1913, the passenger train operated six days a week. However, freight services were in decline: with the acquisition of the WMR in 1908, the Railways Department ceased shipping coal via Foxton. The wharf's condition was deteriorating and by 1916, only one shipping company, with two steamers, used Foxton, and when the company's main shed burnt down in 1922 it ceased to operate. An attempt to get the mainline diverted from Levin, via Foxton and Sanson to Marton was rejected by a Commission in 1916. Local interests continued to try to generate shipping traffic but met with little success and only a small amount of traffic was generated for the railway. In 1922, all shipping via Foxton ceased.

Passenger services ceased on 20 August 1932, and the locomotive depot closed, with the only trains being a daily goods service from Palmerston North. During World War II, troop trains ran as the Manawatu Mounted Rifles established a camp on Foxton's racecourse, but after the war traffic continued to decline. Only three trains ran a week in 1952; in comparison, road freight services to the town were thriving. A mere 5,500 tonnes per annum were railed off the branch to other destinations, while 13,000 tonnes of freight came onto the line. The traffic outwards was mostly woolpacks and root crops, while lumber, lime, manure and coal were the primary traffic inwards. The closure was inevitable, but the line survived until the end of the 1950s. A farewell passenger excursion ran on 17 July 1959 (see video), and the last freight train operated a few days later. Formal closure was on 21 July.

== Today ==
The line ran for much of its length right beside State Highways 1 and 56, but road re-alignment and flood control earthworks have destroyed much of the formation. Near Longburn, State Highway 56 utilises the formation. The platform of Karere Railway Station still exists on State Highway 56. Rubble from both the railway and old road bridges across the Oroua River can still be seen from the new road bridge. The station site and formation northwards remain visible in Foxton.

Cycling enthusiasts have advocated for the construction of a rail trail roughly following the route of the Foxton Branch as part of a strategy to encourage more people to take up cycling and attract more visitors to the region.

== See also ==
- Marton-New Plymouth Line
- North Island Main Trunk
- Castlecliff Branch
- Raetihi Branch
- Toanui Branch
- Whanganui Branch
