= Westmere, Manawatū-Whanganui =

Locality in New Zealand

Westmere
- Interactive map of Westmere
- Coordinates: 39.897°S 174.995°E
- Country: New Zealand
- Region: Manawatū-Whanganui
- District: Whanganui District
- Community: Whanganui Rural Community
- Electorates: Whanganui; Te Tai Hauāuru (Māori)

Government
  - Territorial Authority: Whanganui District Council
  - Regional council: Horizons Regional Council
  - Mayor of Whanganui: Andrew Tripe
  - Whanganui MP: Carl Bates
  - Te Tai Hauāuru MP: Debbie Ngarewa-Packer

Area
  - Total: 36.49 km^{2} (14.09 sq mi)

Population (2023 Census)
  - Total: 873
  - Density: 23.9/km^{2} (62.0/sq mi)

Westmere is a lake and rural community in the Whanganui District and Manawatū-Whanganui region of New Zealand's North Island.

The settlement was established in the late 19th century, with a school being opened near the lake in 1894. Seven generations of the Laird family have been involved in the school, including school co-founder Alex Laird and founding teacher Emma Laird. The buildings were built by local families, and the soil for the grounds was transported with horses and drays from local farms.

Former residents include Wellington paediatrician Dr Brierley Emmett and concert pianist Liam Wooding.

== Demographics ==
Westmere locality covers 36.49 km^{2} (14.09 sq mi). It is split between the larger Brunswick-Papaiti and Mowhanau statistical areas.

Historical population
Year	Pop.	±% p.a.
2006	753	—
2013	768	+0.28%
2018	795	+0.69%
2023	873	+1.89%
The 2006 population is for a larger area of 37.19 km^{2}. Source:

Westmere had a population of 873 in the 2023 New Zealand census, an increase of 78 people (9.8%) since the 2018 census, and an increase of 105 people (13.7%) since the 2013 census. There were 444 males and 429 females in 336 dwellings. 1.7% of people identified as LGBTIQ+. There were 132 people (15.1%) aged under 15 years, 147 (16.8%) aged 15 to 29, 432 (49.5%) aged 30 to 64, and 159 (18.2%) aged 65 or older.

People could identify as more than one ethnicity. The results were 93.8% European (Pākehā); 11.7% Māori; 1.0% Pasifika; 1.4% Asian; 0.7% Middle Eastern, Latin American and African New Zealanders (MELAA); and 2.7% other, which includes people giving their ethnicity as "New Zealander". English was spoken by 98.6%, Māori by 2.4%, Samoan by 0.7%, and other languages by 6.2%. No language could be spoken by 1.4% (e.g. too young to talk). New Zealand Sign Language was known by 1.0%. The percentage of people born overseas was 12.4, compared with 28.8% nationally.

Religious affiliations were 37.1% Christian, 1.0% Hindu, 0.3% Māori religious beliefs, 0.3% Buddhist, and 0.7% other religions. People who answered that they had no religion were 51.9%, and 7.9% of people did not answer the census question.

Of those at least 15 years old, 168 (22.7%) people had a bachelor's or higher degree, 438 (59.1%) had a post-high school certificate or diploma, and 123 (16.6%) people exclusively held high school qualifications. 99 people (13.4%) earned over $100,000 compared to 12.1% nationally. The employment status of those at least 15 was 387 (52.2%) full-time, 147 (19.8%) part-time, and 9 (1.2%) unemployed.

== Education ==
Westmere School is a co-educational state primary school for Year 1 to 8 students, with a roll of 235 as of July 2026. It opened in a shed in 1892, and upgraded to a "substantial" room in 1894.

Between 1994 and 2006, under principal Bill Greening, the school was rebuilt with two new adventure playgrounds. The school board of trustees and parent trustee association raised an average of $30,000 per annum to fund the improvements.
