= SteamRail Wanganui =

Railway preservation society in New Zealand

SteamRail Wanganui is a railway preservation society based in Wanganui, New Zealand. It owns heritage railway locomotives, rolling stock, and structures in the Wanganui area. It also operates occasional excursions in conjunction with other societies and provides a base for excursions passing through Wanganui to stop and visit while replenishing supplies. Its goal is to establish a railway precinct in Wanganui as a historical and tourist attraction.

== Society history and infrastructure ==
The society was formed around 1990 with the express goal of restoring the old Wanganui turntable, which was then facing scrap. SteamRail Wanganui successfully saved the turntable and restored it over a period of three years with the assistance of Steam Incorporated. The first locomotive to use it was Steam Incorporated's K^{A} 945 and the turntable now sees daily use by regular trains, as well as occasional use by visiting excursions. The society subsequently acquired other railway infrastructure in the Wanganui area, including the Aramoho signal box, East Town Workshops staff buildings, and a shed converted into a storage depot for the society's rolling stock.

== Locomotives ==
The organisation possesses three small diesel locomotives, all of which were used in private industrial service rather than by the New Zealand Railways Department. They are:

- Drewry 0-6-0D, built 1950, 102 hp motor.
- Price 0-4-0D, built 1944, 87 hp motor
- Price 0-6-0D, built 1964, 196 hp motor

== Rolling stock ==
The society has a small collection of general freight wagons and "way and works" rolling stock, including fuel tankers, box wagons, and a railway crane. In addition, they possess a passenger wagon rescued from a farmer's field outside Wanganui. It is one of only three built at the Petone Workshops in 1896 and is believed to be the only one of its type to still exist. It is currently partly restored with the goal of returning it to its original condition.
