= Brunswick, New Zealand =

Rural community in Manawatū-Whanganui, New Zealand

Brunswick
- Interactive map of Brunswick
- Coordinates: 39.843°S 175.025°E
- Country: New Zealand
- Region: Manawatū-Whanganui
- District: Whanganui District
- Community: Whanganui Rural Community
- Electorates: Whanganui; Te Tai Hauāuru (Māori)

Government
  - Territorial Authority: Whanganui District Council
  - Regional council: Horizons Regional Council
  - Mayor of Whanganui: Andrew Tripe
  - Whanganui MP: Carl Bates
  - Te Tai Hauāuru MP: Debbie Ngarewa-Packer

Area
  - Total: 13.23 km^{2} (5.11 sq mi)

Population (2023 Census)
  - Total: 216
  - Density: 16.3/km^{2} (42.3/sq mi)

Brunswick is a rural community in the Whanganui District and Manawatū-Whanganui region of New Zealand's North Island.

It is located about 11 kilometres (6.8 mi) north-west of Whanganui, and includes lifestyle blocks and livestock farming.

== History ==
The first European settlers to the area were the Campbell family, who arrived in February 1853 from the Canadian province of New Brunswick. They began farming 225 acres, which they called Brunswick farm; it later became a name for the whole area.

Politician John Bryce purchased a farm in Brunswick in 1851, following a short time in the Australian goldfields. He continued farming there for 50 years, including during his time as a local MP, the Minister of Native Affairs and the Leader of the Opposition.

In 1865, settler and provincial councillor James Hewett was killed by Māori, prompting European settlers to build four fortifications in the area.

In November 1871, Bryce personally directed the invasion of the Māori settlement of Parihaka and the arrest of the leaders of the movement, in line with his strict legal action against non-compliant Māori following the New Zealand Wars.

The National Library of New Zealand holds records of horses, cattle and gardens at Brunswick in the early 20th century, most from the Motohau Station farm.

In the 1930s, local dairy farms would deliver milk and cream by horse-drawn cart for local households.≈

Brunswick has a war memorial for the 12 local men who died in World War I and the three locals who died in World War II.

== Demographics ==
Brunswick locality covers 13.25 km^{2} (5.12 sq mi). It is part of the larger Brunswick-Papaiti statistical area.

Historical population for Brunswick locality
Year	Pop.	±% p.a.
2006	165	—
2013	168	+0.26%
2018	186	+2.06%
2023	216	+3.04%

Brunswick had a population of 216 in the 2023 New Zealand census, an increase of 30 people (16.1%) since the 2018 census, and an increase of 48 people (28.6%) since the 2013 census. There were 105 males and 111 females in 72 dwellings. 2.8% of people identified as LGBTIQ+. The median age was 49.8 years (compared with 38.1 years nationally). There were 42 people (19.4%) aged under 15 years, 27 (12.5%) aged 15 to 29, 102 (47.2%) aged 30 to 64, and 48 (22.2%) aged 65 or older.

People could identify as more than one ethnicity. The results were 95.8% European (Pākehā); 8.3% Māori; 4.2% Middle Eastern, Latin American and African New Zealanders (MELAA); and 2.8% other, which includes people giving their ethnicity as "New Zealander". English was spoken by 100.0%, Māori by 1.4%, and other languages by 5.6%. The percentage of people born overseas was 12.5, compared with 28.8% nationally.

Religious affiliations were 30.6% Christian, and 1.4% Islam. People who answered that they had no religion were 54.2%, and 12.5% of people did not answer the census question.

Of those at least 15 years old, 42 (24.1%) people had a bachelor's or higher degree, 93 (53.4%) had a post-high school certificate or diploma, and 33 (19.0%) people exclusively held high school qualifications. The median income was $46,600, compared with $41,500 nationally. 21 people (12.1%) earned over $100,000 compared to 12.1% nationally. The employment status of those at least 15 was 87 (50.0%) full-time, 33 (19.0%) part-time, and 3 (1.7%) unemployed.

=== Brunswick-Papaiti statistical area ===
Brunswick-Papaiti statistical area, which also includes Westmere, covers 50.83 km^{2} (19.63 sq mi) and had an estimated population of 1,530 as of June 2025, with a population density of 30 people per km^{2}.

Historical population for Brunswick-Papaiti
Year	Pop.	±% p.a.
2006	1,140	—
2013	1,230	+1.09%
2018	1,317	+1.38%
2023	1,479	+2.35%
The 2006 population is for a larger area of 51.53 km^{2}. Source:

Brunswick-Papaiti had a population of 1,479 in the 2023 New Zealand census, an increase of 162 people (12.3%) since the 2018 census, and an increase of 249 people (20.2%) since the 2013 census. There were 744 males, 732 females, and 3 people of other genders in 552 dwellings. 2.2% of people identified as LGBTIQ+. The median age was 50.7 years (compared with 38.1 years nationally). There were 222 people (15.0%) aged under 15 years, 210 (14.2%) aged 15 to 29, 744 (50.3%) aged 30 to 64, and 303 (20.5%) aged 65 or older.

People could identify as more than one ethnicity. The results were 92.9% European (Pākehā); 11.4% Māori; 0.8% Pasifika; 2.6% Asian; 1.0% Middle Eastern, Latin American and African New Zealanders (MELAA); and 4.1% other, which includes people giving their ethnicity as "New Zealander". English was spoken by 99.2%, Māori by 2.4%, Samoan by 0.2%, and other languages by 6.1%. No language could be spoken by 0.8% (e.g. too young to talk). New Zealand Sign Language was known by 0.8%. The percentage of people born overseas was 14.6, compared with 28.8% nationally.

Religious affiliations were 35.1% Christian, 0.6% Hindu, 0.4% Islam, 0.6% Māori religious beliefs, 0.2% Buddhist, 0.2% Jewish, and 1.0% other religions. People who answered that they had no religion were 53.3%, and 8.5% of people did not answer the census question.

Of those at least 15 years old, 285 (22.7%) people had a bachelor's or higher degree, 729 (58.0%) had a post-high school certificate or diploma, and 243 (19.3%) people exclusively held high school qualifications. The median income was $43,800, compared with $41,500 nationally. 162 people (12.9%) earned over $100,000 compared to 12.1% nationally. The employment status of those at least 15 was 648 (51.6%) full-time, 228 (18.1%) part-time, and 15 (1.2%) unemployed.

== Education ==
Brunswick School is a co-educational state primary school for Year 1 to 8 students, with a roll of 107 as of July 2026. The school opened in 1873. It buried a time capsule in 2020, to be opened at its 175th jubilee in 2048.
