= Aramoho =

Suburb of Whanganui

- Suburb
- Interactive map of Aramoho
- Coordinates: 39.904034°S 175.060965°E
- Country: New Zealand
- City: Whanganui
- Local authority: Whanganui District Council

Area
  - Land: 365 ha (900 acres)

Population (June 2025)
  - Total: 4,360
  - Density: 1,190/km^{2} (3,090/sq mi)

Brunswick		Upokongaro
Otamatea	Aramoho
St Johns Hill	Whanganui East

Aramoho is a settlement on the Whanganui River, in the Whanganui District and Manawatū-Whanganui region of New Zealand's North Island. It is an outlying suburb of Whanganui.

== History ==
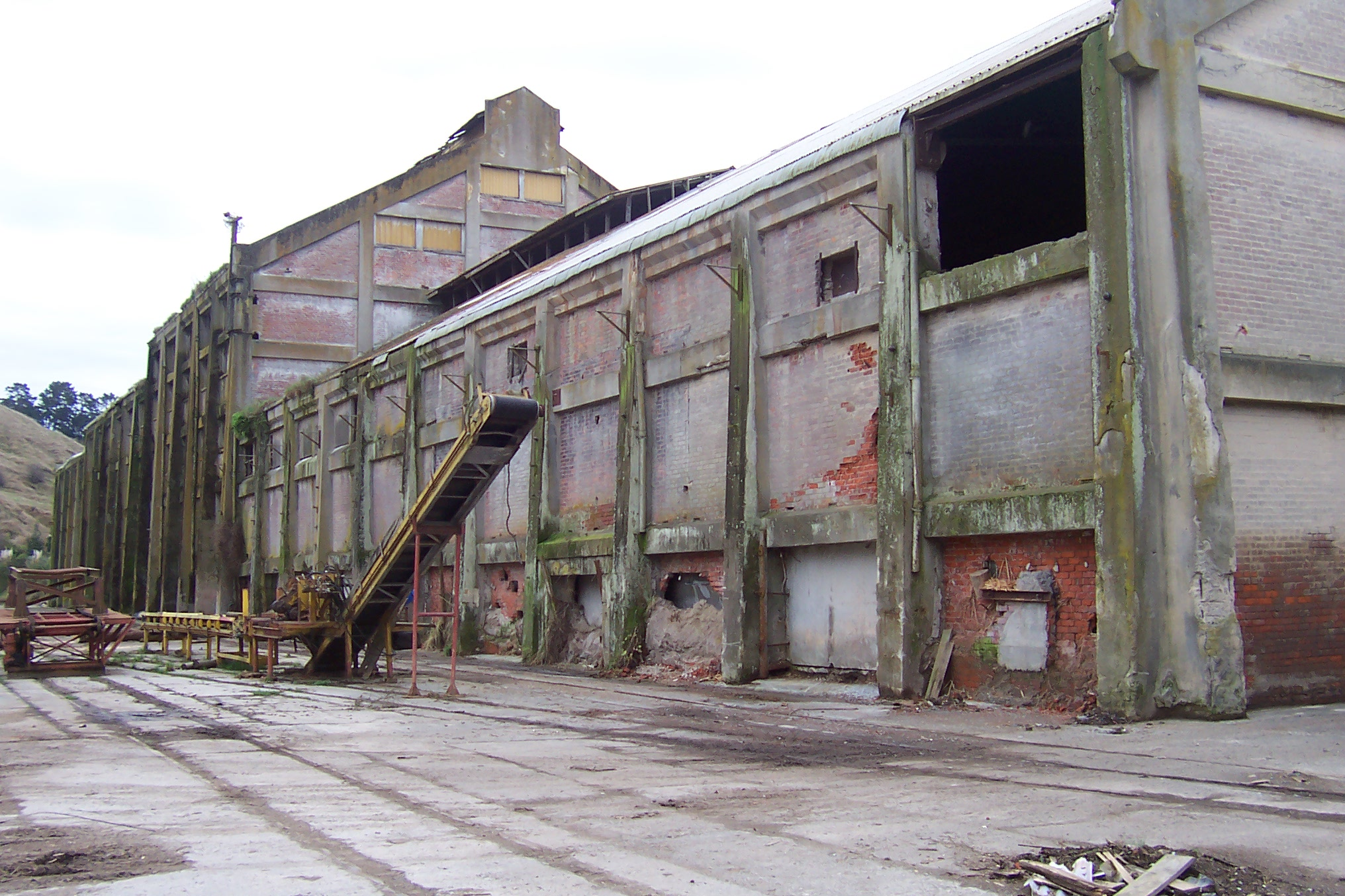
The remains of the Kempthorne Prosser Chemical Works at Aramoho.

The settlement was established on the river in the 1860s, upstream from the European Wanganui settlement and the Māori Pūtiki settlement. A school was established in 1873. The name may be derived from ara mohoau, or 'path of the North Island takahē'.

A rail bridge at Aramoho, on the Marton–New Plymouth line, along with a railway station was completed in 1877. A fire destroyed the original building about 1900, and the replacement remained until 1986. Despite its closure in 1986 the station was still extant until 1997 when it was demolished parts of it are now preserved by SteamRail Wanganui.

In the early 20th century, families would travel up the river on a paddle steamer for an annual picnic at Hipango Park. Parents also raised money for a school pool, where generations of children learned to swim.

A private zoo opened in 1909 by John Boyd on the grounds of the former Aramoho Tea Garden this zoo brought many animals from the Hamburg zoo in Germany the zoo was shut down in 1916 and remains can be still found today.

The National Library of New Zealand holds a photograph of school students and staff from 1915, showing boys wearing shorts, long socks, ties and blazers, and girls wearing dresses, on a small field in front of a school house. Another photo of children at the school featured in the New Zealand Railways Magazine in 1937.

A rose garden was planted near the school after World War I who commemorate locals who had died in the war. The garden later became a memorial to all pupils and teachers who had died in both world wars.

In 1926, Kempthorne Prosser opened a drug and fertiliser factory in Aramoho. It has since been used as a fertiliser plant and a medical centre.

In the 1930s, the Duchess Theatre or Duck Theatre began showing films. It later became the Aramoho Plaza.

The suburb expanded after World War II with a meatworks, a pickle factory, tea gardens, a fruit evaporating company, and various hotels and boarding houses.

== Demographics ==
Aramoho covers 3.65 km^{2} (1.41 sq mi) and had an estimated population of 4,360 as of June 2025, with a population density of 1,195 people per km^{2}.

Historical population
Year	Pop.	±% p.a.
2006	3,966	—
2013	3,693	−1.01%
2018	3,966	+1.44%
2023	4,212	+1.21%

Aramoho had a population of 4,212 in the 2023 New Zealand census, an increase of 246 people (6.2%) since the 2018 census, and an increase of 519 people (14.1%) since the 2013 census. There were 2,052 males, 2,148 females, and 15 people of other genders in 1,638 dwellings. 3.5% of people identified as LGBTIQ+. The median age was 37.7 years (compared with 38.1 years nationally). There were 936 people (22.2%) aged under 15 years, 705 (16.7%) aged 15 to 29, 1,770 (42.0%) aged 30 to 64, and 804 (19.1%) aged 65 or older.

People could identify as more than one ethnicity. The results were 77.1% European (Pākehā); 35.0% Māori; 3.7% Pasifika; 4.1% Asian; 0.5% Middle Eastern, Latin American and African New Zealanders (MELAA); and 1.8% other, which includes people giving their ethnicity as "New Zealander". English was spoken by 96.4%, Māori by 10.3%, Samoan by 0.6%, and other languages by 5.3%. No language could be spoken by 2.4% (e.g. too young to talk). New Zealand Sign Language was known by 0.7%. The percentage of people born overseas was 10.7, compared with 28.8% nationally.

Religious affiliations were 26.3% Christian, 0.4% Hindu, 0.3% Islam, 4.2% Māori religious beliefs, 0.4% Buddhist, 0.9% New Age, 0.1% Jewish, and 1.4% other religions. People who answered that they had no religion were 58.3%, and 8.3% of people did not answer the census question.

Of those at least 15 years old, 465 (14.2%) people had a bachelor's or higher degree, 1,857 (56.7%) had a post-high school certificate or diploma, and 957 (29.2%) people exclusively held high school qualifications. The median income was $31,700, compared with $41,500 nationally. 105 people (3.2%) earned over $100,000 compared to 12.1% nationally. The employment status of those at least 15 was 1,386 (42.3%) full-time, 489 (14.9%) part-time, and 156 (4.8%) unemployed.

Individual statistical areas
Name	Area (km^{2})	Population	Density (per km^{2})	Dwellings	Median age	Median income
Lower Aramoho	2.08	2,040	979	762	36.2 years	$30,000
Upper Aramoho	1.56	2,175	1,392	876	39.6 years	$33,400
New Zealand					38.1 years	$41,500

== Education ==
Churton School is a co-educational state primary school for Year 1 to 6 students, with a roll of 119 as of July 2026. It opened in 1975.

St Mary's School is a co-educational state-integrated primary school for Year 1 to 8 students, with a roll of 241. It opened in 1919 on Victoria Avenue in the central city, moved to Grey Street in 1927 and then to Wicksteed Street in 1964. It moved to Aramoho in 1988, on a site occupied by Holy Infancy (later St Joseph's) school from 1899 to 1979.

The original Aramaho School was established in 1973 and closed in 2016 due to an ageing local population and the growth of kohanga reo and other schools. The Education Review Office had raised several concerns about how the school was being managed before its closure.

The Born and Raised Pasifika preschool was established on part of the Aramoho School site in 2003.

The Holy Infancy School opened in Aramoho in 1889 to provide Catholic education, becoming known as Sister Rita's School for the sister who ran the school for 40 years. It was renamed St Joseph's School in 1966, became an intermediate school for girls in 1970, and finally closed in 1979.

== Marae ==
Te Ao Hou Marae is located in Aramoho, across the road from Churton School. It is a tribal meeting ground of Ngāti Tupoho, and the Ngāti Rangi hapū of Ngāti Rangi-ki-tai.

The marae occupies a section of Māori freehold land on the banks of the Whanganui River that was originally a summer fishing and food gathering place for the Ngāti Rangi people. A meeting house, called Te Puawaitanga, was built at the site in the 1970s. The blessing of the completed marae was photographed by Ans Westra in 1978.

Homes and toilets were later added to the site. In 2019, the marae trust applied for Government funding to expand its meeting house so it would not need to put up tents for tangihanga and other special events.

The marae marks the downstream end point for Tira Hoe Waka, an annual pilgrimage in which participants paddle waka between marae on the Whanganui River.
