= Tongariro National Park =

National park in New Zealand

- IUCN category II (national park)
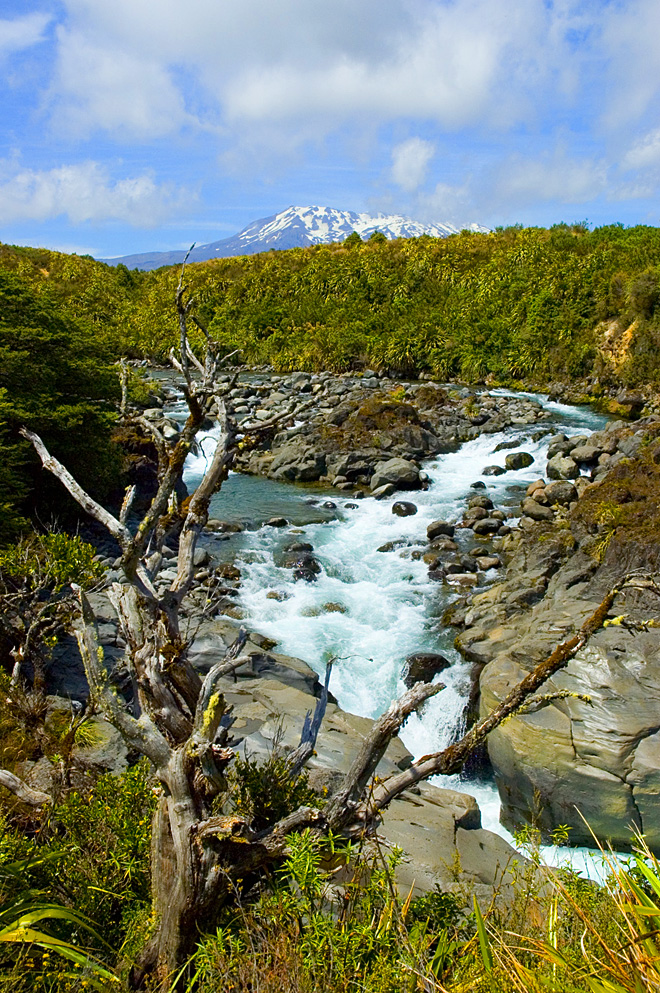
- Mahuia River, Tongariro National Park
- Interactive map of Tongariro National Park
- Location: Ruapehu District, New Zealand
- Nearest city: National Park, New Zealand
- Coordinates: 39°17′27″S 175°33′44″E
- Area: 795.96 km^{2} (307.32 sq mi)
- Established: October 1887
- Governing body: Department of Conservation; Whakapapa Visitor Centre; Private Bag; Mount Ruapehu 2650

UNESCO World Heritage Site
- Criteria: Cultural and Natural: (vi), (vii), (viii)
- Reference: 421bis
- Inscription: 1990 (14th Session)
- Extensions: 1993

Tongariro National Park (/ˈtɒŋərɪroʊ/; Māori: [tɔŋaɾiɾɔ]), located in the central North Island, is the oldest national park in New Zealand and the sixth national park established in the world. It has been recognised by UNESCO as a World Heritage Site for its mixed cultural and natural values.

The active volcanic mountains Ruapehu, Ngauruhoe, and Tongariro are located in the centre of the park. Three ski fields operate from the slopes of Mount Ruapehu, and the park is also a popular recreation area for hiking, fishing, hunting and other outdoor pursuits. Tongariro National Park is home to the famed Tongariro Alpine Crossing, widely regarded as one of the world's best one-day hikes.

The natural environment of the park ranges from temperate rainforest to beech forest, tussock shrubland and alpine ecosystems. A variety of endemic and native birds and plants are found in the park.

There are a number of Māori religious sites within the park, and many of the park's summits, including Ngauruhoe and Ruapehu, are tapu, or sacred.

There are many small towns around the boundary of the park including Ohakune, Waiouru, Horopito, Pokaka, Erua, Waimarino (also known as National Park Village) and Tūrangi.

== Māori relationship to the mountains ==
In Māori legend the volcanoes in Tongariro National Park are personified. Various versions of the basic story exist: Tongariro and Taranaki were both in love with Ruapehu or Pihanga and had a great battle. Taranaki lost the battle and fled west towards the coast, carving out the Whanganui River on the way. The Tama Lakes (Māori: Ngā puna a Tama), two crater lakes between Mount Ruapehu and Mount Ngauruhoe, are said to represent the gap left when Taranaki departed.

In 2017, the Department of Conservation issued a notice advising visitors not to climb to the summits of the mountains in Tongariro National Park because they are sacred to local iwi. Some Māori view the mountains as their ancestors, with the peaks being the heads of the ancestors, and believe it is wrong to stand on the heads of the ancestors. The notice also asked tourist operators to "remove all references to summit side trips or ascending peaks in the park, remove any images of people touching or swimming in sacred lakes and to stop referring to Mt Ngauruhoe as Mt Doom". Following the advisory notice, Department of Conservation staff noticed a significant decrease in the number of people summiting mountains in the park.

The park falls within the tribal areas (rohe) of two main iwi: Ngāti Tūwharetoa and Ngāti Rangi. The northern and western parts of the park, extending south to the summit of Ruapehu, belong to Ngāti Tūwharetoa while Ngāti Rangi's area includes the southern and south-western flank of Ruapehu. Other iwi with traditional interests in the park are the upper Whanganui iwi Ngāti Hāua and Te Korowai o Wainuiārua from the Whanganui River.

The Waitangi Tribunal's national park inquiry in 2004 to 2013 investigated Treaty of Waitangi claims relating to Tongariro National Park. In July 2018, the Crown met representatives of some iwi and it was agreed that negotiations would be delayed until all groups with interests in the park had had their settlements progressed, at which time cultural redress would be developed. The cultural redress process seeks to protect spiritually significant sites, recognise the traditional relationships of iwi with the environment, and give claimants greater power to participate in managing the places involved.

== History ==
=== Early history ===
According to Māori oral history, Ngāti Tūwharetoa ancestor Ngātoro-i-rangi climbed the volcanoes 30 generations ago, naming Tongariro and other landscape features and claiming the area for his descendants.

Around 1750, Te Rangihiroa, son of local chief Pakaurangi, was said to have explored the area around the volcanoes in the park. The Māori name for Blue Lake, near the Tongariro Alpine Crossing, is Te Wai-whakaata-o-te-Rangihiroa, which can be translated as 'Rangihiroa's mirror'. Te Rangihiroa's sister was Te Maari, whose name was given to the Te Maari craters on Tongariro.

John Bidwill is thought to be the first European to climb Mount Ngauruhoe, in March 1839. His Māori guides refused to take him to the summit because it was sacred or tapu, so Bidwill climbed alone. He was met with anger when he returned to the village from which he had started. Bidwill may also have climbed Mount Tongariro. The chief Mananui Te Heu Heu Tūkino II then placed a tapu on the area. Dieffenbach, Governor George Grey and Hochstetter were denied permission to ascend the volcanoes, and the artist George French Angas was forbidden from sketching the mountains.

Mananui and many of his family died in a landslide in 1846. His body and that of his wife were put into a pataka (a storehouse raised on poles) at Pukawa, and later taken to a burial cave on Mount Tongariro. In 1910, Mananui's remains were reinterred in a tomb at Waihī.

Henry Dyson made an ascent of Ngauruhoe in March 1851, defying Mananui's tapu but with the support of Te Herekiekie of Tokaanu. Pierce Connelly, an artist, climbed Ngauruhoe in 1877 and William Collie, photographer, climbed Ngauruhoe in 1878. Both were stripped of their belongings for breaking the tapu on the mountain. Donald Manson, a watch salesman from the United States, climbed Ngauruhoe in 1881 after paying Māori £10 for permission to do so.

=== Park establishment ===
With the mountain summits being of great significance to local Māori, and in order to prevent the selling of the mountains to European settlers, in 1886 the Ngāti Tūwharetoa iwi had the mountains surveyed in the Native Land Court and then set aside as a reserve in the names of certain chiefs. One of these chiefs was Te Heuheu Tūkino IV (Horonuku), son of Mananui Te Heuheu Tūkino II and the most significant chief of the Ngāti Tūwharetoa iwi. The peaks of Mount Tongariro, Mount Ngauruhoe and parts of Mount Ruapehu were conveyed to the Crown on 23 September 1887, on condition that a protected area was established there.

Opposition to Te Heuheu's gift came from Te Moanapapaku Te Huiatahi. Te Huiatahi petitioned Parliament on behalf of 180 people, stating that most of Tongariro belonged to him, not Te Heuheu. He stated that he owned the land by ancestry and occupation and said his hapū had 200 whare (dwellings) on the land in question. Te Huiatahi's claim was denied.

The 26.4 km^{2} (10.2 sq mi) area given by Te Heu Heu was generally considered to be too small to establish a national park, so further areas were acquired. When the New Zealand Parliament passed the Tongariro National Park Act in October 1894, the park covered an area of about 252.13 km^{2} (97.35 sq mi), but it took until 1907 for the government to acquire the land.

In 1908, a scientific party consisting of botanist Leonard Cockayne, forester and surveyor Edward Phillips Turner and geologist Robert Speight spent several months exploring and surveying the park. They presented a report to Parliament detailing the flora, fauna and geology of the region, and recommended that the park's boundaries be expanded. Cockayne also noted that it was important to protect the environment from development and introduced pests.

The park area was extended to 586.8 km^{2} (226.6 sq mi) when the Act was renewed in 1922. Further extensions, especially Pihanga Scenic Reserve in 1975, enlarged the park to its current size of 795.96 km² (307.32 sq mi). Tongariro National Park is managed under the National Parks Act 1980. Tongariro National Park has been under the control of the New Zealand Department of Conservation since the creation of the department in 1987.

A sculpture and plaque at the visitor centre in Whakapapa Village commemorate Te Heuheu's gift to New Zealand.

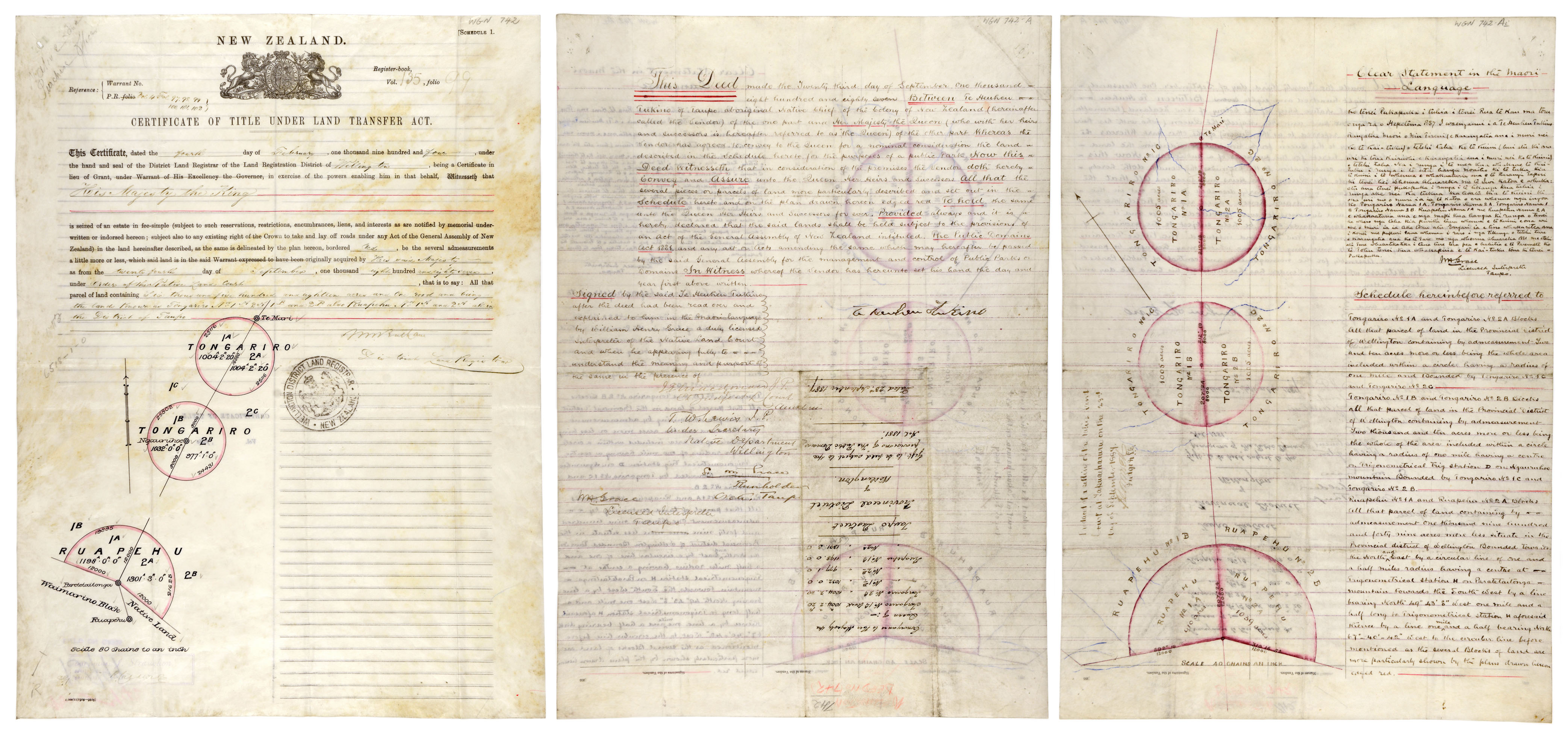
Tongariro deed of gift between Te Heuheu Tūkino IV of Ngāti Tūwharetoa and the Crown (1887)

=== Development ===
The first development in Tongariro National Park was the construction of tourist huts at the beginning of the 20th century, but it was not until the opening of the North Island Main Trunk railway line between Auckland and Wellington in 1908 and the building of roads in the 1920s that a significant number of people visited the park. This early tourist development explains the rather uncommon existence of a permanently inhabited village and fully developed ski area within a national park. Skiing on the mountains in the park became popular from about 1914, when the Ruapehu Ski Club was established. The first ski hut was built on Mt Ruapehu in 1923 at an elevation of 1770 m, and a ski lift was constructed in 1938–1939. The second Tongariro National Park Act, in 1922, started some active conservation efforts, and in 1923 a park ranger was appointed.

The first motor vehicle reached Whakapapa village via the Bruce Road in August 1925, after the previous rough cart track was upgraded by prison labour and a bridge was built over the Whakapapa River. This led to an influx of tourists and demands for more accommodation at Whakapapa. The hotel Chateau Tongariro at Whakapapa opened in 1929 with 95 bedrooms and associated cheaper lodges for trampers. The road was extended beyond Whakapapa Village after World War 2. Road access to the park was further improved in the 1960s with the development of roads needed for building the Tongariro Power Scheme.

=== World Heritage Site ===
In 1990, New Zealand nominated Tongariro National Park as a World Heritage Site. World Heritage Sites are places protected under a treaty administered by UNESCO for having cultural, historical, or scientific heritage considered to be of outstanding value to humanity. The government's nomination stated that the park was valuable under the 'Natural Property' category for its chain of volcanoes aligned along a tectonic plate boundary, showing Earth's evolutionary history; its ongoing geological processes and associated plant environments; and its outstanding natural phenomena and beauty. Mount Ruapehu was said to be the "most active composite volcano in the world", making it ideal for scientific observation. Crater Lake on Mount Ruapehu was stated to be unique due to its glacial setting and frequent eruptions, making it a case study of the lahar-producing interaction of magma and lake water. The park was listed for its natural features in 1990, and in 1993 it achieved dual heritage status for having both natural values and Māori cultural and spiritual significance. This was the first national park in the world to have its spiritual significance recognised as a "cultural landscape", an initiative supported by Tumu Te Heuheu of Ngati Tūwharetoa.

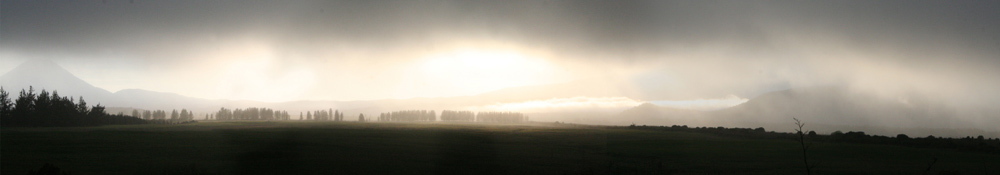
Sunrise on Tongariro National Park

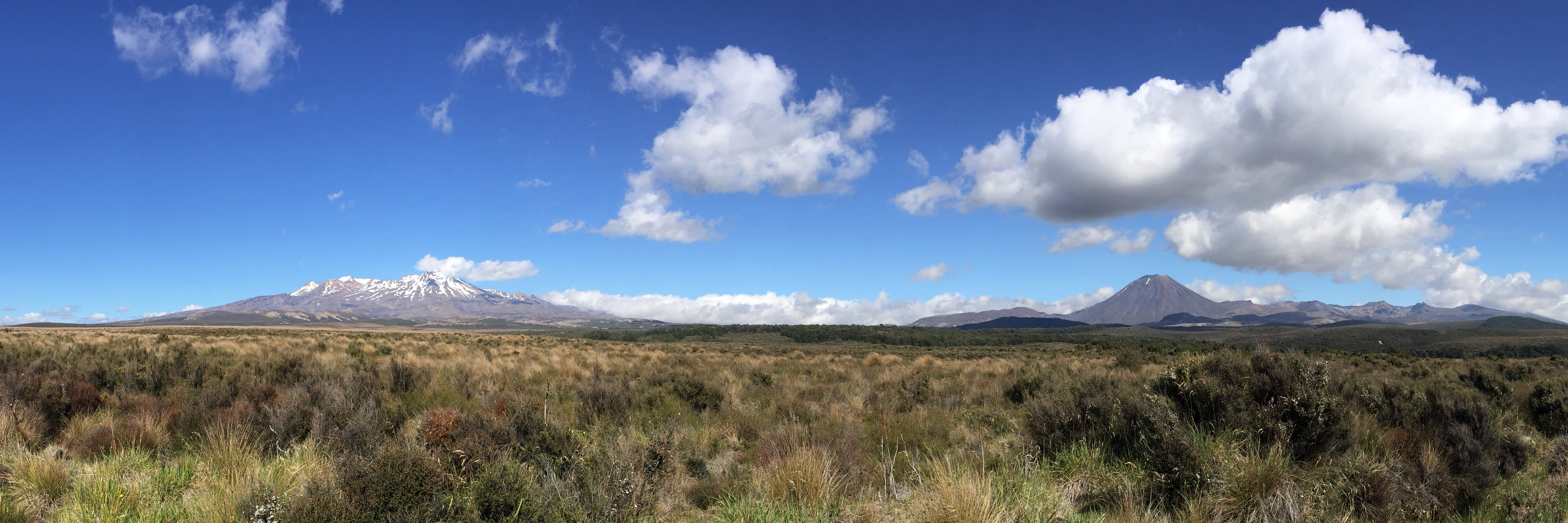
Panorama of Mount Ruapehu and Mount Ngauruhoe looking west from the Desert Road in January 2015

== Geography ==
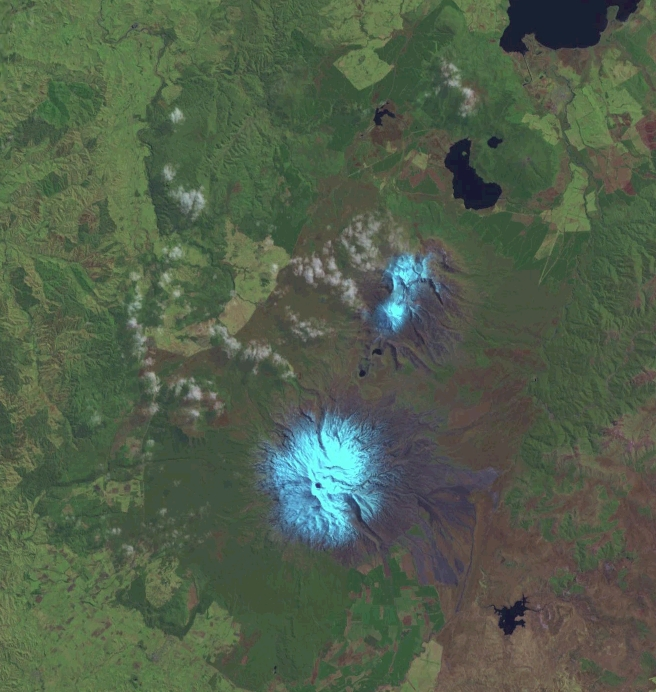
Satellite picture of Tongariro National Park

=== Location and size ===
Tongariro National Park covers an area of 795.96 km^{2} (307.32 sq mi) (including the Pihanga Scenic Reserve) surrounding the massif of the three active volcanoes Mount Ruapehu, Mount Ngauruhoe, and Mount Tongariro in the centre of the North Island. The northern boundary of the park is just a few kilometres west-southwest of Lake Taupō. The Tongariro National Park Visitor Centre at Whakapapa Village is 338 km (210 mi) south of Auckland by road, and 337 km (209 mi) north of Wellington.

Pihanga Scenic Reserve, though isolated from the main park area, is also part of the national park. It covers 51.29 km^{2} (19.80 sq mi), including Lake Rotopounamu, Mount Pihanga and the Kakaramea-Tihia Massif.

Most of the park is located in the Ruapehu District (Manawatū–Whanganui Region), although the northeast is in the Taupō District (Waikato Region, or Hawke's Bay Region to the north).

Three towns are adjacent to the park: Tūrangi, Waimarino (formerly called National Park Village) and Ohakune. Further away are Waiouru and Raetihi. Two Māori settlements, Papakai and Otukou, are not part of the park but lie to the west of Lake Rotoaira between the Pihanga Scenic Reserve and the main park area. Within the park borders, the only settlement is the tourism-based Whakapapa Village where the Chateau Tongariro, accommodation facilities and the Tongariro National Park Visitor Centre are located. There is temporary visitor accommodation at Iwikau Village on the Whakapapa ski field and at the Tukino ski field.

==== Rangipo Desert and the Desert Road ====
Rangipo Desert (also known as Te Onetapu) is a largely uninhabited area of about 100 km^{2} (39 sq mi) to the east of Mount Ruapehu. Part of it is owned by the army and the rest is in Tongariro National Park. Rangipo Desert receives 1,500–2,500 mm (59–98 in) of rainfall per year, but resembles a desert because of its location on the volcanic plateau, poor soil quality and consequent erosion, sparse vegetation and strong drying winds. Frosts are common and heavy snowfalls occur in winter. The stretch of State Highway 1 passing through the Rangipo Desert is known as the Desert Road.

==== Keketahi hot springs ====
Ketetahi hot springs is an area of 39 ha (96 acres) on the northern slope of Mount Tongariro which, although lying within the park boundaries, has never been part of Tongariro National Park. Hikers on the Tongariro Alpine Crossing were formerly allowed to pass by the hot springs, but the Māori owners, Ketetahi Springs Trust, closed the route because they objected to commercial guides making money from their land. In 2010 the Department of Conservation agreed to re-route the Tongariro Alpine Crossing so that it does not cross the private land.

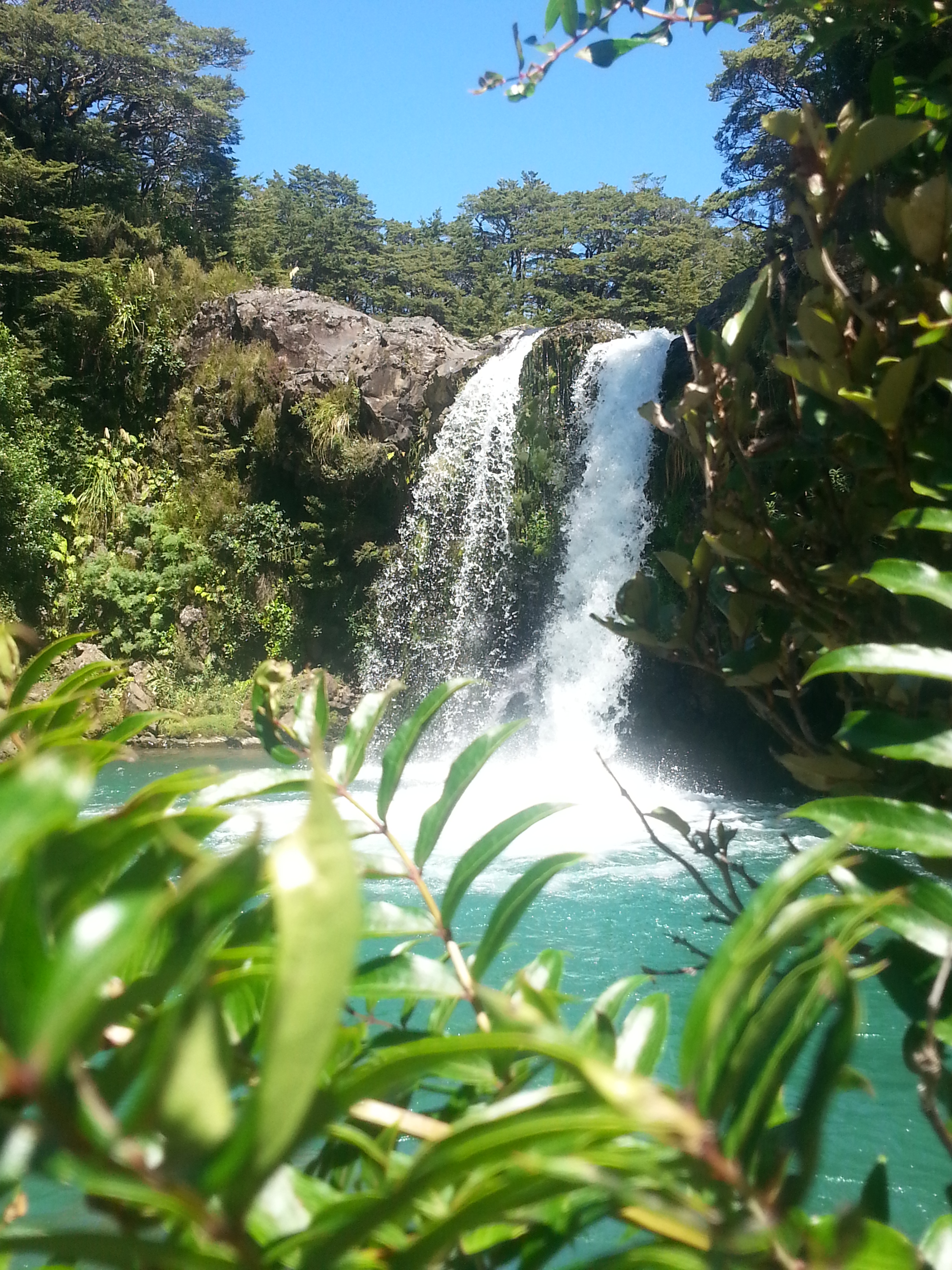
Tawhai Falls near Whakapapa Village

=== Climate ===
Like the whole of New Zealand, Tongariro National Park is situated in a temperate zone. The prevailing westerly winds gather water over the Tasman Sea. Apart from Mount Taranaki, the volcanoes of Tongariro National Park are the first significant elevations that these westerly winds encounter across the central North Island. In the western and northern parts of the park, rain falls on at least half the days in a year. The east–west rainfall differences are not as great as in the Southern Alps, because the three volcanoes do not belong to a greater mountain range, but there is still a noticeable rain shadow effect. The Rangipo Desert on the eastern leeward side receives around 2,000 mm (79 in) of rainfall annually. At Whakapapa Village (elevation 1119 m) the average annual rainfall is about 2,200 mm (87 in), in Ohakune (610 m) about 1,250 mm (49 in) and at higher altitudes, such as Iwikau Village (1770 m), about 4,900 mm (190 in). In winter there is snow to about 1500 m. Temperatures vary dramatically, even within one day. At Whakapapa, the temperature can fall below freezing point all year round. The average temperature is 13 °C, with a maximum of 25 °C in summer and a minimum of −10 °C in winter. In some summers the summits of the three volcanoes are covered with snow; on top of Mount Ruapehu, snow fields can be found every summer and the summit is glaciated.

=== Rivers ===
Many rivers originate in the park, including the Waikato, Whangaehu and Whanganui. The Waikato River, which is sacred to Māori, rises on Mount Ruapehu. Also rising on Ruapehu are the Wahianoa River, Whangaehu River and Mangawhero River. To the west the Whanganui River and its tributary the Mangatepōpō Stream rise on Mount Tongariro, flowing eventually into the Whanganui National Park, and the Tāwhitikuri Stream rises in the park and flows into the Mangatepōpō. Water from streams and rivers which rise in the park is diverted into the Tongariro Power Scheme outside the park.

== Geology ==
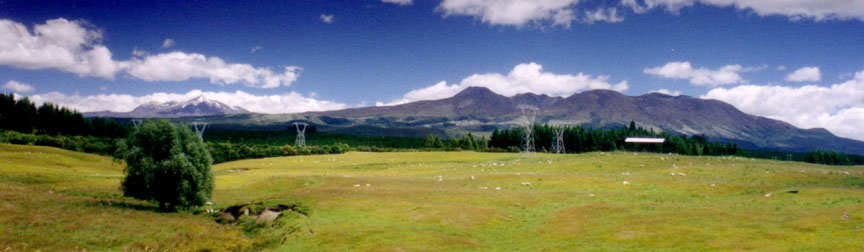
The three volcanoes: snow-capped Ruapehu (left), conical Ngauruhoe (centre) and broad-domed Tongariro (right)

The park's volcanoes are at the southern end of a 2,500 km-long (1,600 mi) range of volcanoes stretching to Samoa, below which the Australian Plate meets the Pacific Plate. These volcanoes have resulted from internal tectonic processes. The Pacific Plate subducts under the Australian plate, and subsequently melts due to the high temperatures of the asthenosphere. This magma, being less dense, rises to the surface and goes through the weak parts of the Earth's crust (the faults) resulting in volcanic processes in the area.

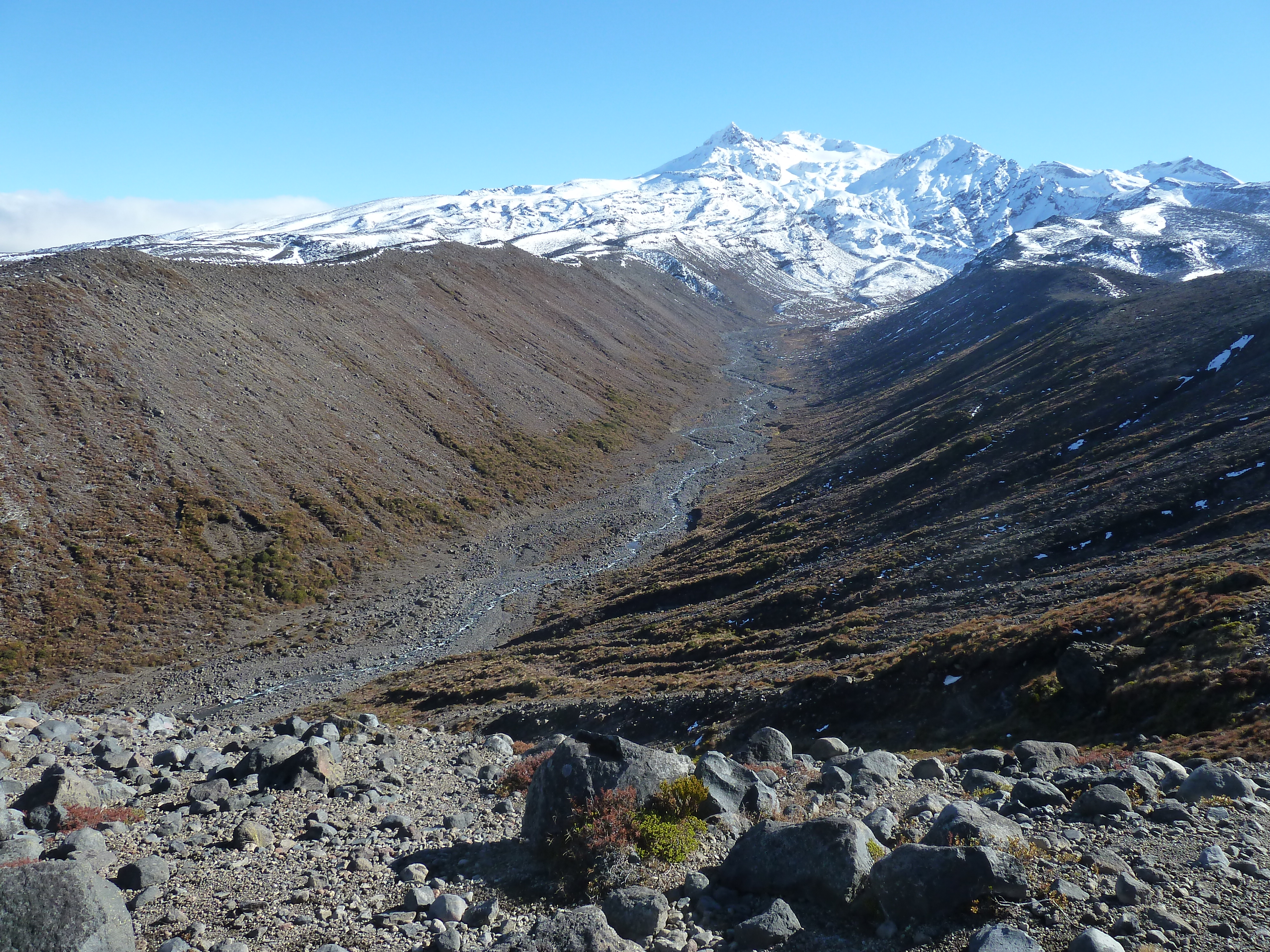
Wahianoa Valley, a glaciated valley on the southeast side of Mount Ruapehu

Volcanic processes have been building the mountains of Tongariro National Park for over two million years. Three volcanoes (Tongariro, Ngauruhoe and Ruapehu) remain active, while the park's two northernmost volcanoes (Pihanga and the Kakaramea-Tihia Massif) last erupted over 20,000 years ago. They have however produced significant historic mudflows.

Erosion and deposition by mountain glaciers have also played an important role in shaping Mount Tongariro and Mount Ruapehu volcanoes. Small glaciers are present on the summit of Mount Ruapehu today, but there is abundant geomorphological evidence for more extensive glaciation in the recent geological past. Glaciers were last present on Tongariro during the Last Glacial Maximum.

== Ecology ==
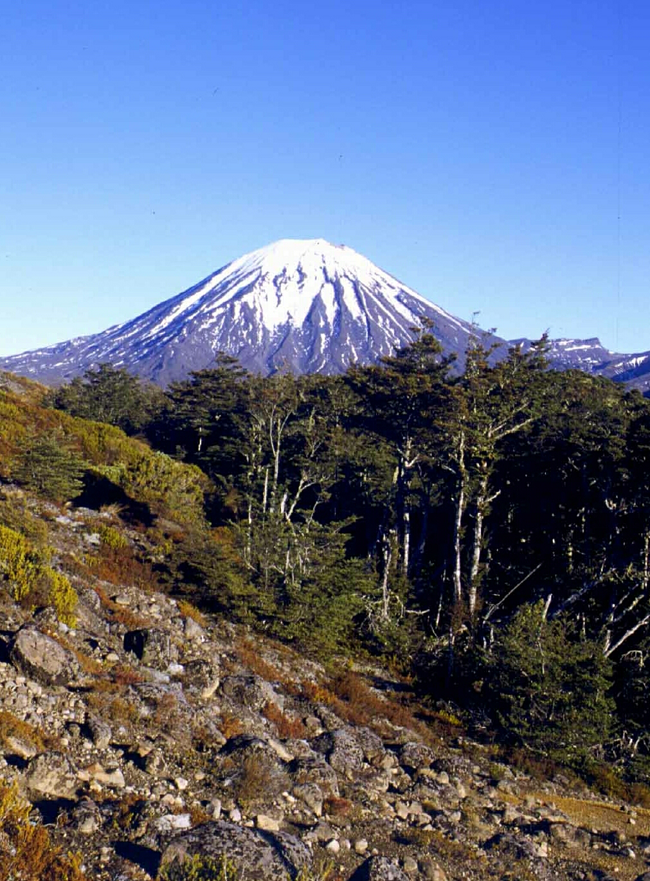
Southern beech forest on the slopes of Mount Ruapehu

=== Flora ===
The park has numerous vegetation zones which usually have distinct boundaries: forest, shrub, scrubland, tussock, fernland, sedgeland, rushland, moss field, gravel and stone fields and ice fields. Vegetation patterns are generally determined by altitude, for example the mountain beech is generally found above 1000 m, but also depend on other factors: existing forests have developed since the Taupō pumice eruption which destroyed the park's northern and eastern forests; tussock and shrubland are the result of burning, except those above the treeline which are related to climate and soil conditions; poor soil drainage resulted in bracken fernlands, sedgeland and rushlands around Hauhungatahi. Erosion and climate allow only small tussock and shrubs to grow in gravel and stone fields.

In the north of the park, south of State Highway 47, is a podocarp-broadleaf rain forest where there are Hall's totara (Podocarpus laetus), kahikatea (Dacrycarpus dacrydioides), rimu (Dacrydium cupressinum), northern rātā (Metrosideros robusta), kāmahi (Pterophylla racemosa) and kaikawaka (Libocedrus bidwillii). The forest understorey contains mountain cabbage trees (Cordyline indivisa), Coprosma tenuifolia, Cyathea smithii, black maire (Nestigis cunninghamii), māhoe (Melicytus ramiflorus), bush flax (Astelia fragrans), epiphytes, and grasses and ferns such as crown fern (Blechnum discolor). At a lower altitude there are areas of kānuka (Kunzea serotina), mānuka (Leptospermum scoparium) and bracken (Pteridium esculentum).

Beech forests of red (Nothofagus fusca), silver (Nothofagus menziesii) and mountain beech (Nothofagus solandri var. cliffortioides) grow on Tongariro as well as near the Waihohonu Huts, and to the south and west of Ruapehu. Red mistletoe (Peraxilla tetrapetala) grows in summer on the mountain beech at Whakapapa Village.

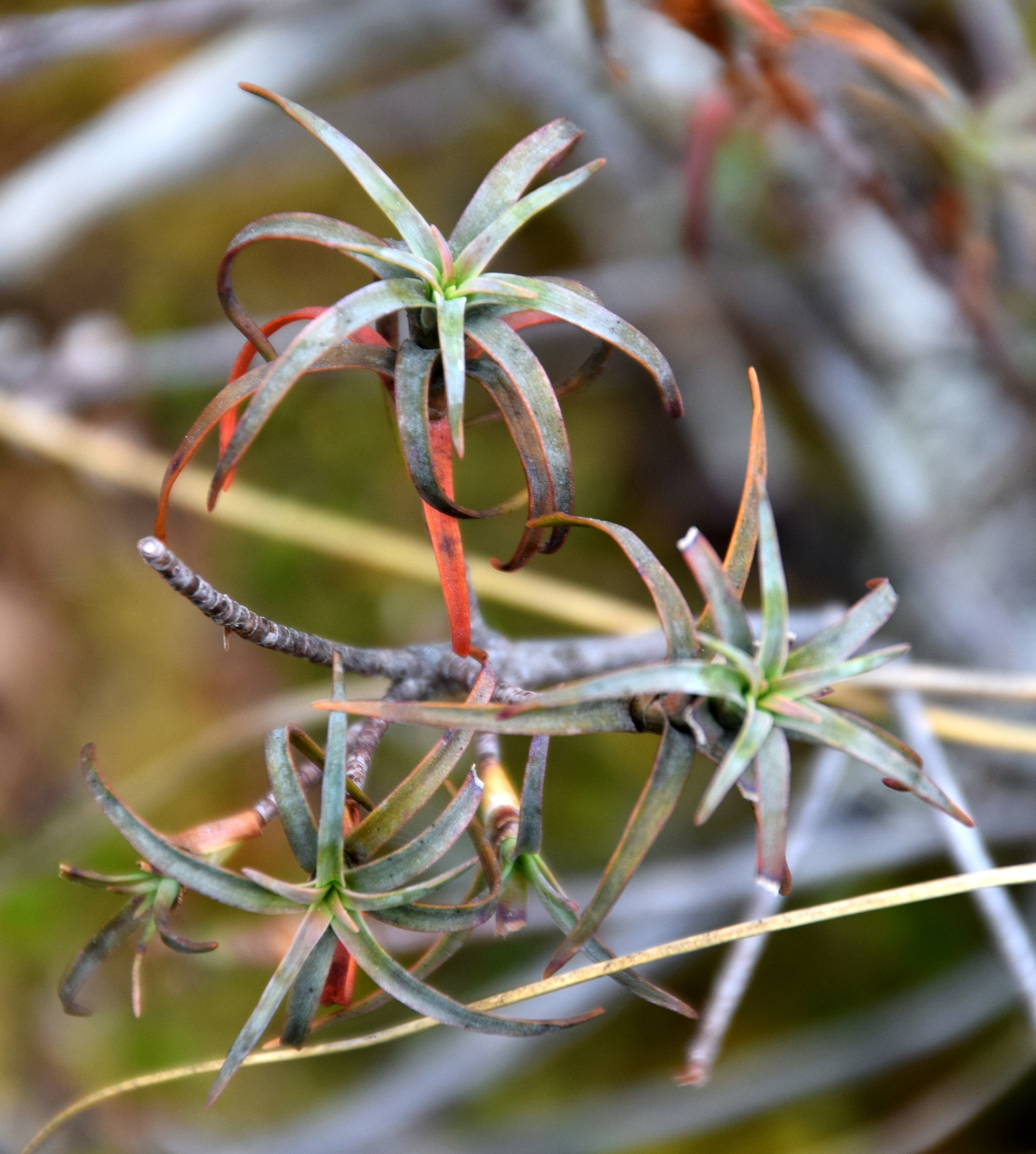
Mountain inaka (Dracophyllum recurvum) in Tongariro National Park

To the northwest of the park and around the three mountains, between an altitude of 1200 and 1500 m, are tussock and shrubland. The tussock consists mainly of red tussock grass (Chionochloa rubra), mountain inaka (Dracophyllum recurvum), wire rush (Empodisma minus), monoao (Dracophyllum subulatum) and tangle fern (Gleichenia alpina). West of Tongariro exotic heather (Calluna vulgaris), with its distinctive pink and mauve flowers, grows on better drained sites where it competes with red tussock, mountain inaka and other native species.

The gravel and stone fields support mountain inaka, bristle tussock (Rhytidosperma setifolium), snow totara (Podocarpus nivalus) and snowberry (Gaultheria colensoi) at an altitude of about 1100–1550 m. Mountain inaka establishes itself in crevices and on stable ground surfaces. Red tussock, mountain daisies (Celmisia sp.) and other tussocks grow but the vegetation is constantly broken down by the frost. Orchids, such as the leek-leaved orchid (Prasophyllum colensoi) and green-hooded orchid (Pterostylis patens), grow on Tongariro's sub-alpine and alpine areas. Mosses (including species of Rhacomitrium) are found to the north of the Blue Lake on Tongariro and moss fields occur on other moist gravel slopes. Above 1770 m, parahebes, everlasting daisies (Helichrysum sp.) and mountain carrot (Anisotome aromatica) exist up to about 2000 m, above which there are only crustose lichens on stable rocks.

=== Fauna ===
There are more than 56 species of birds in the park, including rare endemic species like the North Island brown kiwi, kākā, blue duck, North Island fernbird, double-banded plover and New Zealand falcon/kārearea. Other bird species common in the park are tūī, New Zealand bellbird, morepork/ruru, grey warbler/riroriro, fantail, whitehead/pōpokotea and silvereye. The park also features the only two native mammals of New Zealand, the short- and long-tailed bat. Tongariro National Park also teems with insects like moths and wētā. Also present in the park, as well as the whole of New Zealand, are animals introduced by Europeans, such as black rats, stoats, cats, rabbits, hare, possums and red deer.

== Conservation ==
=== Heather ===
In the early 20th century, park administrators including John Cullen introduced calluna heather to the park to make it suitable for grouse hunting. Grouse were introduced in 1924, but within a few years had disappeared. The heather thrived, leading to criticism of its introduction as early as the 1920s because it threatens the ecological system and endemic plants of the park. Heather has caused the disappearance of native ferns, sedges and rushes and affected the growth pattern of red tussock. An underground fungus that has a symbiotic relationship with the tussock was also affected by the spread of heather.

In 1996, the heather beetle Lochmaea suturalis was imported to deal with the invasive heather but initially this was not very successful. Between 1996 and 2018, only 5,000 ha of heather was damaged by the beetles. However research in 2021 showed that the heather beetles were spreading and had been killing the heather. Since 2018 the beetles have damaged more than 35,000 ha of heather, reducing cover in affected areas by up to 99% and thereby allowing native plants to recover. The New Zealand Defence Force no longer needs to spray herbicide on large parts of its training ground next to the national park. A 2024 study of heather in the park found that it was present over one third of the landscape of the park.

=== Pine trees ===
Pine trees were introduced into New Zealand in the 1930s for forestry and control of erosion, but wilding pines, coniferous trees grown from wind-blown seeds, have become a nationwide problem. Volunteers and the government have been working since the 1960s to eradicate wilding pines on Mount Ruapehu, since they shut out native plants, consume water and degrade the environment. Tongariro National Park received funding from the National Wilding Conifer Control Programme which was set up in 2016 to produce a coordinated nationwide effort at pine control. By 2023 the Conifer Control Programme had stopped the spread of wilding pines in the Tongariro area including the national park and removed most sources of seeds.

=== Kaimanawa horses ===
Until the mid-20th century, wild horses descended from animals brought to New Zealand in the 1800s roamed in the national park and surrounding areas. After the population declined due to hunting and habitat changes, the horses, today known as the Kaimanawa horses, came under government protection in 1981. The population is managed by the Department of Conservation to ensure the horses' current range does not extend back into Tongariro National Park.

=== Deer, goats and pigs ===
Red deer were released periodically in Tongariro National Park from the late 19th century, and sika deer introduced to the Kaimanawas in 1905 later spread to the park. By the 1940s, deer were recognised as a menace to local plant life, and the government made efforts to reduce the population through culling. During 1962, deer were regularly sighted within metres of the Chateau, a sign that the population was higher than officials had thought. Private hunters can shoot deer in the park as a means to keep the population down.

Alongside a goat control programme in Tongariro Forest adjacent to Tongariro National Park, the Department of Conservation (DoC) is vigilant about detecting feral goats within the park. In 2024, a helicopter using thermal imaging technology searched 16,000 ha of the park for goats, but none were found. DoC states that regular surveillance and early action are more cost-effective than trying to root out a population that has already become established.

Pigs are found in low numbers in the Rotopounamu-Mount Pihanga area and the northern slopes of Mount Tongariro. Pigs affect plant life by eating seedlings and berries and rooting up the roots of trees and plants. Disturbance of plant roots also increases erosion and sends sediment into rivers. Pigs have also been known to eat the eggs of ground-dwelling birds such as kiwi. The Department of Conservation keeps numbers down by hunting, and private hunting is allowed.

=== Project Tongariro ===
The Tongariro Natural History Society (known as Project Tongariro) is a conservation group set up by volunteers in 1984 as a memorial to national park staff lost in a 1982 helicopter accident. Since the 1980s, the group has undertaken many projects in Tongariro National Park, including ecological restoration at Lake Rotopounamu, restoration of sites used in filming the Lord of the Rings, surveys of blue duck habitats, and restoration of the Hapuawhenua Viaduct in the park.

=== Over-tourism ===
In the period July 2022 – March 2023, 9% of international visitors to New Zealand spent time in Tongariro National Park. Over-tourism is a problem in the park, particularly on the Tongariro Alpine Crossing where visitor numbers increased from 10,000 in 1990 to 125,000 in 2015. In addition to the difficulties of managing greater numbers of vehicles, rubbish disposal and toilet facilities, the environment becomes degraded and park staff face more callouts for visitors needing rescue. In an attempt to manage the situation, in 2023 the Department of Conservation put in place a booking system for those wishing to walk the Tongariro Alpine Crossing.

=== 2025 wildfire ===
On 8 November 2025, a fire was reported in the national park to the east of Waimarino, near State Highway 47, at 3:15 pm. The fire was started accidentally when a vehicle travelling on SH 47 lost a rear wheel. The vehicle's undercarriage dragged along the road, causing sparks which ignited dry vegetation at the side of the road. The area involved in the fire grew rapidly, and hikers were evacuated from the Tongariro Alpine Crossing. Whakapapa Village was also evacuated on 9 November. By the end of 9 November the area of the fire had expanded to about 2,500 ha (6,200 acres). By the afternoon of 10 November, Fire and Emergency New Zealand estimated the area of the fire at 2,800 ha (6,900 acres). Steady rainfall and light winds on 10 November assisted efforts to contain the fire. The burnt area was scrub and forest that was regenerating following previous major fires in 1918 and 1947. The Technical Advisor for Project Tongariro, ecologist Nick Singers stated that dead calluna heather contributed to the intensity of the fire. Ecological threats in the area burnt in the fire include the return of weeds such as heather, broom, gorse and wilding pines.

== Activities ==
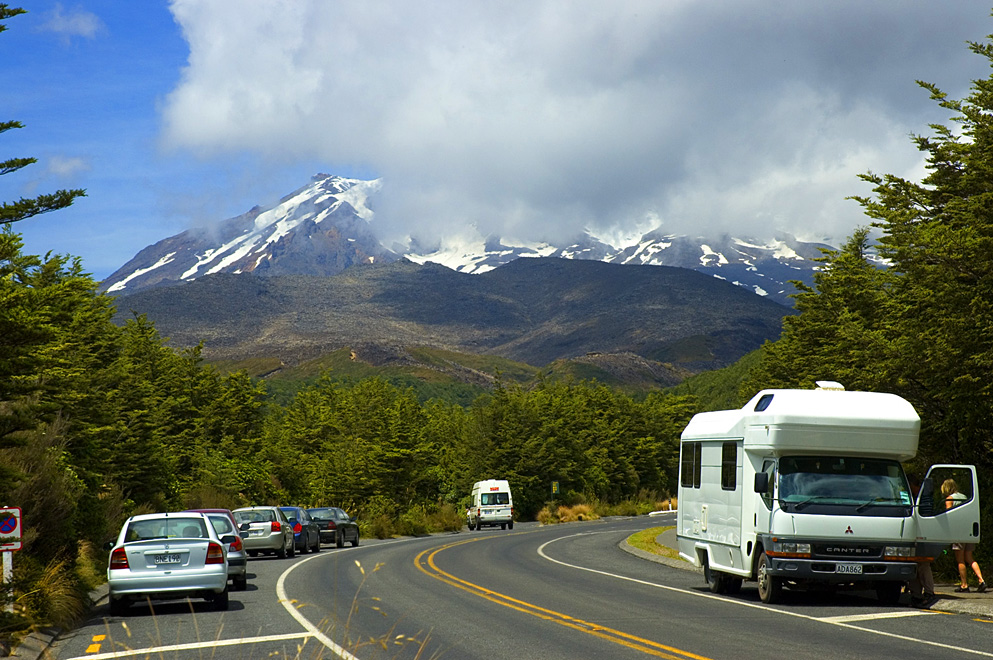
Ruapehu seen from Whakapapa Village, Tongariro National Park. This road climbs to Iwikau Village, which provides access to ski fields.

The main recreational activities in the park are hiking and climbing in summer, and skiing and snowboarding in winter.

=== Access ===
The bulk of Tongariro National Park is surrounded by roads that roughly follow the park borders and provide access. In the west, State Highway 4 passes Waimarino (National Park Village), and in the east, State Highway 1 runs parallel to the Tongariro River. State Highway 47 joins these two highways to the north of much of the park, although it bisects the Pihanga Scenic Reserve. The southern link is State Highway 49. The North Island Main Trunk railway from Auckland to Wellington passes Waimarino.

The main entrance to the park is at Whakapapa Village, accessed via State Highway 48. A mountain access road leads from Whakapapa Village to Iwikau Village at the base of Whakapapa ski field. On the Turoa side, the Ohakune Mountain Road provides access from Ohakune township to the base of Turoa ski field. Over its short length the road rises 910 m through rimu forest, beech forest and tussock. There is also a ski field access road to the Tukino ski field. These three roads each ascend to over 1,700 m above sea level. Other roads into the park include Mangatepopo Road and Ketetahi Road, which provide access to the start and end points of the Tongariro Alpine Crossing.

=== Hiking and walking ===
The most popular track in Tongariro National Park is the Tongariro Alpine Crossing. Most of the track is also part of the Tongariro Northern Circuit, a two- to four-day hike, which is one of New Zealand's ten Great Walks. Side trips to the summits of Mount Tongariro and Mount Ngauruhoe are possible on these tracks, though discouraged by the Department of Conservation. Another route is the three- to six-day Round the Mountain Track around Mount Ruapehu. Besides these, there are numerous shorter tracks appropriate for day tramps. Rock-climbing is also an option.

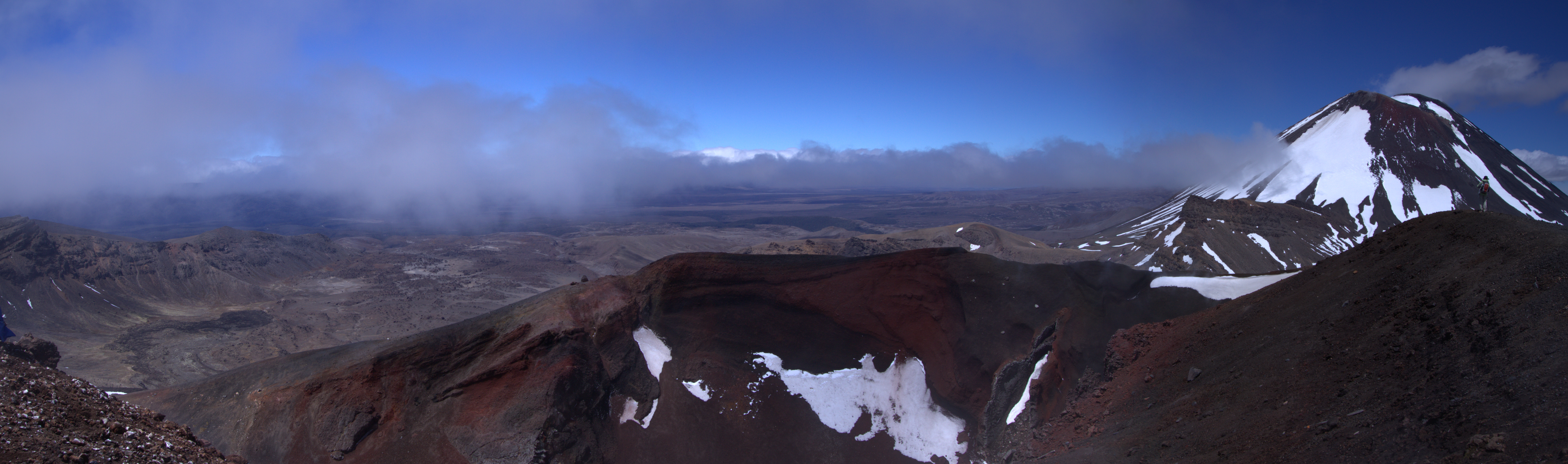
View of Mt. Ngauruhoe from Tongariro Alpine Crossing trail

=== Skiing ===
Snow season is from late June to early November. The biggest ski area, Whakapapa, is on the north-western slopes of Mount Ruapehu. As of 2026, It has 12 lifts covering an area of 5.5 km^{2} (2.1 sq mi). The base of the ski field is at Iwikau Village, at the top of the Bruce Road, 6 km (3.7 mi) from the Tongariro National Park Visitor Centre. Iwikau Village has 46 ski club huts: most of them also accommodate non-club members. Other facilities and accommodation are located in Whakapapa Village at the base of the mountain.

A second ski field called Turoa is located on the south-western slope. It has nine lifts and a ski area of 5 km^{2} (1.9 sq mi). There is no accommodation at Turoa ski field: the nearest town is Ohakune. These two ski fields came under common management in 2000. The company later went into receivership, and in November 2023, Pure Tūroa, a Māori collective, took over a 10-year lease of Turoa. Management of Whakapapa remained with the receivers.

Apart from these major ski fields, there is also Tukino, a club ski field that is open to the public. Tukino Skifield has three nutcracker rope tows and covers 1.7 km^{2} (0.66 sq mi). The field is accessed via a 4WD road from State Highway 1. The Tukino field is run by the Tukino Mountain Clubs Association, representing Desert Alpine Ski Club, Tukino Alpine Sports Club and the Aorangi Ski Club on the south-eastern slope. The three ski clubs each have an accommodation block on the field.

=== Mountain biking ===
Mountain biking was originally only allowed on the main formed roads in the park. However, the partial review of the National Park Management Plan (2006) conducted in 2011 allowed for public mountain biking and concessions for mountain biking operations on two additional specified routes: the Old Coach Road, and the track from the Desert Road to the Pillars of Hercules (a gorge on the Tongariro River). A further partial review of the management plan conducted in 2018 provided for additional mountain biking options on future shared-use walking and mountain biking tracks through the park, on the routes Turoa to Ohakune, Ohakune to Horopito, and Horopito to National Park. The 2018 amendment also permitted the use of e-bikes on the approved routes.

==== Te Ara Mangawhero cycling and walking track ====
The first stage of Te Ara Mangawhero, a cycling and walking track between Mount Ruapehu and Ohakune, opened on 4 November 2024. The iwi Ngāti Rangi, the Department of Conservation and Ruapehu District Council collaborated to build the 11.4 km loop track which is expected to bring tourists to the area. The track passes through sub-alpine forest along an old bush tramway. Eventually the track is expected to extend towards Turoa ski field and form part of the Mountains to Sea trail from Mount Ruapehu down the Whanganui River to the sea.

=== Hazards ===
Recreational activities in Tongariro National Park, particularly in the alpine areas, come with some risk as visitors fall, get lost or are not prepared for sudden or severe weather changes in the alpine environment. There are memorials in the park to early visitors who lost their lives. Horace Holl is commemorated on a memorial near the Mangaturuturu Hut on the 'Round the Mountain' track. Holl was a well-known climber and explorer who drowned in 1927 while leading a pack horse across a flooded river. The Stanton memorial, a plaque on a large rock in the Whakapapaiti Valley, commemorates 18-year-old Warwick Stanton who died in August 1931. Stanton was one of a group of 14 university students caught in bad weather on Mount Ruapehu. He left the party to seek help but did not survive. Only months after Stanton died, the Mountain Guides Act was enacted in November 1931 to license alpine guides, in an attempt to avoid similar tragedies in future.

Recent incidents include walkers dying of hypothermia in 2018 and 2019, a climber dying after a fall in 2020, and people dying in skiing accidents in 2022 and 2024. In 2017, a report produced by the Mountain Safety Council showed that out of all public conservation areas in New Zealand, Tongariro National Park had the most tramping-related search and rescue incidents.

Sudden weather changes have been responsible for several major incidents in the park. In 1990, six soldiers on a training exercise on Mount Ruapehu died when their group of 13 was stuck in a blizzard with inadequate supplies and insufficient shelter. In 2008, the Mangatepopo Canyon disaster occurred when six students and a teacher on an outdoor pursuits trip died after a thunderstorm caused a flash flood in a gorge on the Mangatepopo Stream in Tongariro National Park.

Air accidents in the park include 13 people killed when their plane went off course and crashed into Mount Ruapehu in 1948, and five people who died in a helicopter accident at Mount Ruapehu in 1982.

==== Volcanic hazards ====
Since Mounts Ruapehu, Tongariro and Ngauruhoe are active volcanoes, there is risk from eruptions or lahars. Skiers were evacuated from the ski fields in September 1995, when an eruption of ash and steam occurred. An eruption detection system operates in the ski areas on Mount Ruapehu, and will activate sirens and loudspeaker messages if necessary. Iwikau Village, as well as some ski lifts and cafés elsewhere on Whakapapa ski field, have been deemed to be safe from lahars, which flow down valleys. In 2007, a small eruption on Mount Ruapehu caused lahars, and one climber had a leg amputated after a boulder crashed through the alpine hut that he was in, trapping him.

On Mount Tongariro, the tracks including the Tongariro Alpine Crossing are closed if volcanic activity increases. In 2012, the Upper Te Maari Crater at Tongariro erupted, damaging huts and tracks. The Tongariro Alpine Crossing closed and did not fully reopen until May 2013 after volcanic activity had subsided.

Visitors are also at risk if they do not follow warning signs and instructions. In 2020, a tramper on the Tongariro Alpine Crossing was badly burned when he ventured too close to a steam vent to take photos and his leg went through the crust.

=== Historic sites ===
Several publicly-accessible historic sites can be visited within the park.

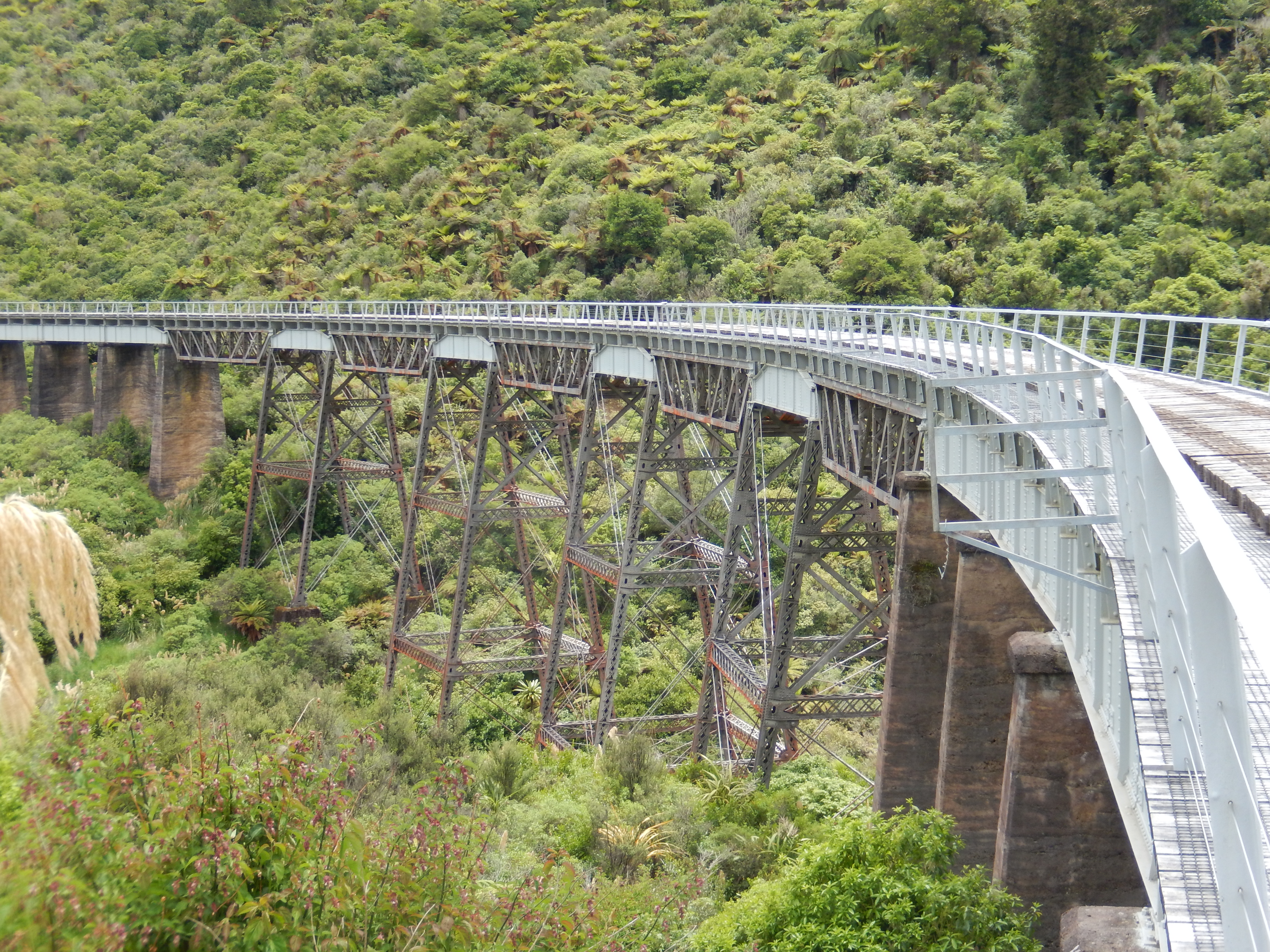
1908 Hapuawhenua Viaduct on the North Island Main Trunk line.

==== Waihohonu Hut ====
Waihohonu Hut is located on the north-east slope of Mount Ruapehu near the Desert Road. It was built by the Tourist and Health Resorts Department on its current site in 1904 and is New Zealand's oldest existing mountain hut. It was built to house tourists travelling to the park by coach, but use declined somewhat after the Main Trunk railway line was constructed at the other side of the park. The hut was used regularly until 1968, when it was replaced by a new hut with the same name, and since 1979 the original hut has been maintained as a historic site. It was registered as a Historic Place Category 1 by the Historic Places Trust (now Heritage New Zealand) in 1993. A previous Waihohonu hut was extant in 1894. It was approximately 14 km (9 mi) from the peak of Mount Ruapehu, near the Waihohonu Stream.

==== Taonui Viaduct and Hapuawhenua Viaduct ====
The Taonui Viaduct (1907) and Hapuawhenua Viaduct (1908), located between Ohakune and Horopito, were constructed as part of the North Island Main Trunk railway line. Together they form a pair of large curved steel truss railway viaducts, which are unusual in New Zealand. At 284 m long, the Hapuawhenua Viaduct is the longest of the existing viaducts that were built on the NIMT (The Mangaweka Viaduct was longer, but was demolished in the 1980s). Both viaducts were in use until 1987, when the Horopito Deviation opened and a new, concrete Hapuawhenua Viaduct was built. The railway tracks on both old viaducts were lifted, and a walkway of old sleepers was created along the centre of the deck of the original Hapuawhenua Viaduct. The Hapuawhenua Viaduct was listed as a Historic Place Category 1 in 1995, and in 2009 the Taonui Viaduct was also listed as a Historic Place Category 1. In 2009, the newly conserved Hapuawhenua Viaduct opened to the public as a walking and cycling track.

==== Fergusson Cottage ====
Fergusson Cottage at Whakapapa Village was listed as a Historic Place Category 2 by Heritage New Zealand in 2005. It was built in 1924 and is the oldest extant structure in the village. As the third hut built in the area for visiting hikers and skiers, it was initially known as 'No. 3 Hut' and was also known as 'Ladies Hut', accommodating women in mixed parties. After Lady Fergusson stayed there in August 1926, the hut's name was changed to Fergusson Cottage. The cottage was later extended and modified several times. It was used as accommodation for Chateau Tongariro staff until 1993, when it became a café.

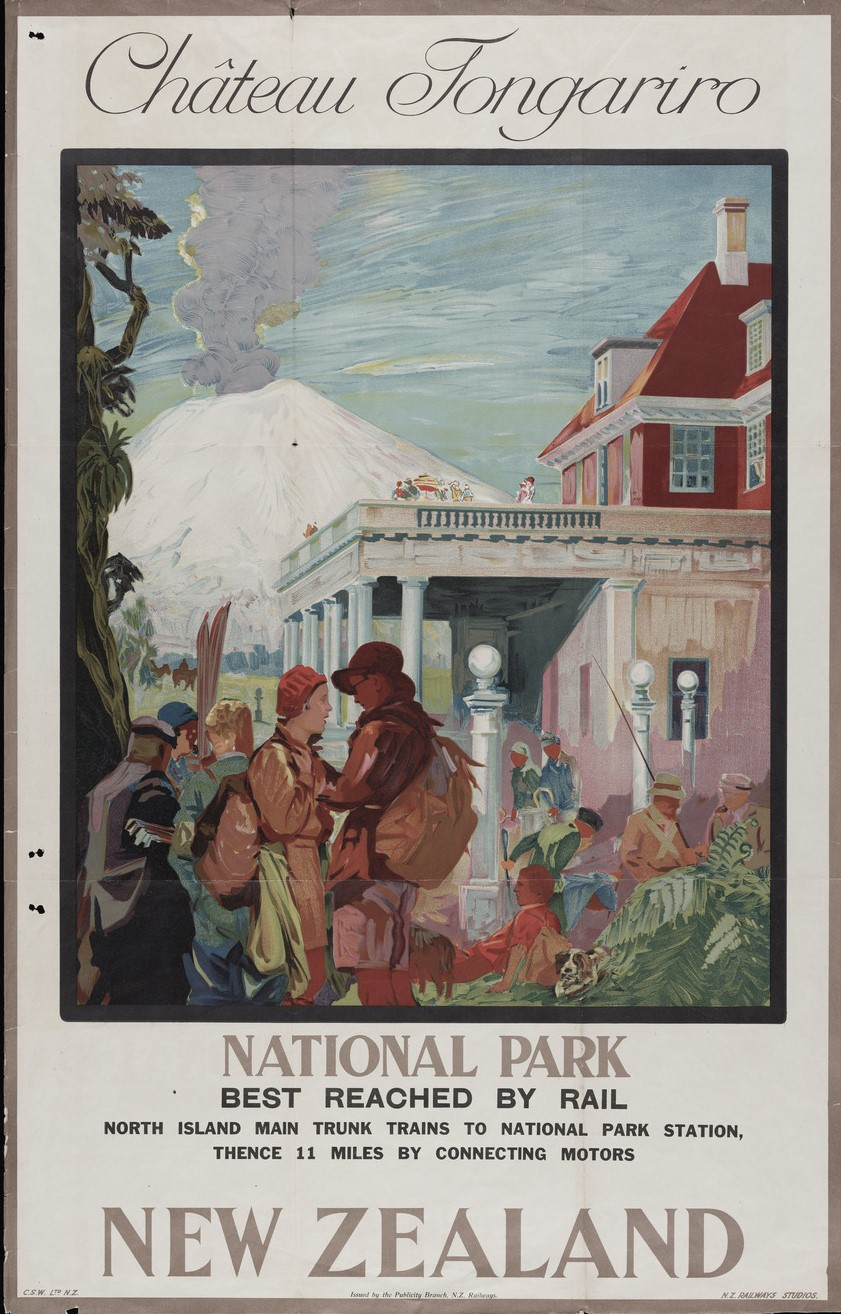
1931 New Zealand Railways poster advertising the newly opened Chateau Tongariro

==== Chateau Tongariro ====
The Chateau Tongariro, also known as the Grand Chateau, was an opulent hotel built at Whakapapa Village by a subsidiary of the Mount Cook Tourist Company and opened in 1929 to serve the increasing number of visitors to Tongariro National Park. The New Zealand Government managed the hotel from 1932 until the 1980s. The hotel closed in 2023 due to being an earthquake risk. The building was listed as a Historic Place Category 1 by Heritage New Zealand in 1996, in recognition of its architecture, historical significance to the area and to international tourism to New Zealand, and its "iconographic status".

== In popular culture ==
A 1983 feature film, Wild horses, was filmed in the park. The plot centres around a conflict between Kaimanawa horse wranglers, deer cullers and park rangers.

Peter Jackson shot scenes on Mount Ruapehu for The Lord of the Rings film trilogy including locations representing Mt Doom, Ithilien and Mordor. Locations at the Mangawhero River, Whakapapa ski field and Tukino ski field can be visited.

Mount Ngauruhoe was also featured in Hunt for the Wilderpeople.

Tongariro National Park landscapes were used as backgrounds for Queen Bavmorda's castle in the 1988 film Willow.

== See also ==
- Tongariro Power Scheme
- National parks of New Zealand
- Forest parks of New Zealand
- Regional parks of New Zealand
- Protected areas of New Zealand
- Conservation in New Zealand
