= Whakapapa Village =

Village in Tongariro National Park, New Zealand

- Minor urban area
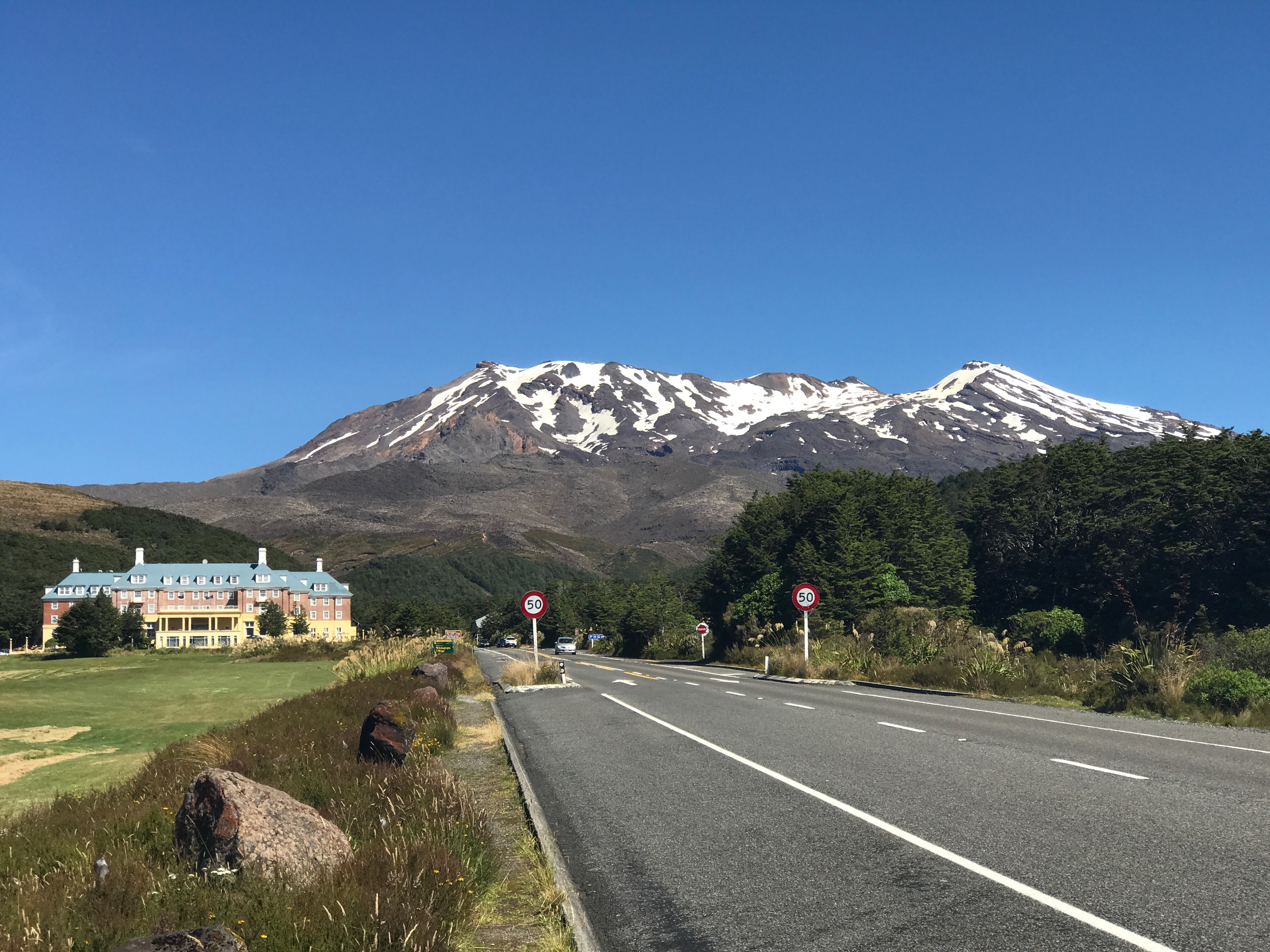
- Chateau Tongariro and Bruce Road (State Highway 48), with Mount Ruapehu in the background
- Interactive map of Whakapapa Village
- Coordinates: 39.201°S 175.539°E
- Country: New Zealand
- Region: Manawatū-Whanganui
- District: Ruapehu District
- Electorates: Whanganui; Te Tai Hauāuru (Māori)

Government
  - Territorial Authority: Ruapehu District Council
  - Regional council: Horizons Regional Council
- Time zone: UTC+12 (NZST)
  - Summer (DST): UTC+13 (NZDT)
- Postcode: 3951
- Telephone: 06

Whakapapa Village is a small village in the Ruapehu District of New Zealand, which serves as the main entrance to Tongariro National Park.

== Geography ==
The village is located on the western slopes of Mount Ruapehu, in the Whakapapanui Stream valley. Much of the area is surrounded by a mountain beech-dominated forest, with areas of tussock grassland. The village is accessible by State Highway 48, one of the shortest state highways in New Zealand, which branches from State Highway 47.

=== Climate ===
Whakapapa Village has mild summers with max summer temperatures around 20, and very cold winters for New Zealand standards with snow falling on some days, with an elevation just shy of 1200 meters. The average daytime high in July is 6 degrees, compared to the 17 in February. Severe frosts occur frequently in the winter months. Whakapapa Village receives an average of 2,200 mm (87 in) of rain per year.

Climate data for Whakapapa Village (1991–2020 normals, extremes 1930–present)
Month	Jan	Feb	Mar	Apr	May	Jun	Jul	Aug	Sep	Oct	Nov	Dec	Year
Record high °C (°F)	29.4 (84.9)	28.1 (82.6)	26.1 (79.0)	21.9 (71.4)	20.3 (68.5)	18.9 (66.0)	16.5 (61.7)	19.4 (66.9)	19.9 (67.8)	23.8 (74.8)	29.0 (84.2)	30.0 (86.0)	30.0 (86.0)
Mean maximum °C (°F)	23.9 (75.0)	23.1 (73.6)	21.3 (70.3)	18.2 (64.8)	15.4 (59.7)	12.3 (54.1)	11.3 (52.3)	11.9 (53.4)	15.0 (59.0)	17.8 (64.0)	20.3 (68.5)	22.0 (71.6)	24.6 (76.3)
Mean daily maximum °C (°F)	18.1 (64.6)	18.2 (64.8)	16.1 (61.0)	13.0 (55.4)	10.0 (50.0)	7.4 (45.3)	6.9 (44.4)	7.3 (45.1)	9.1 (48.4)	11.1 (52.0)	13.4 (56.1)	15.9 (60.6)	12.2 (54.0)
Daily mean °C (°F)	12.5 (54.5)	12.8 (55.0)	11.0 (51.8)	8.5 (47.3)	6.0 (42.8)	3.8 (38.8)	3.2 (37.8)	3.5 (38.3)	4.9 (40.8)	6.6 (43.9)	8.3 (46.9)	10.9 (51.6)	7.7 (45.8)
Mean daily minimum °C (°F)	6.9 (44.4)	7.4 (45.3)	5.9 (42.6)	3.9 (39.0)	2.1 (35.8)	0.1 (32.2)	−0.6 (30.9)	−0.3 (31.5)	0.7 (33.3)	2.0 (35.6)	3.2 (37.8)	5.8 (42.4)	3.1 (37.6)
Mean minimum °C (°F)	0.5 (32.9)	1.1 (34.0)	−0.4 (31.3)	−2.3 (27.9)	−4.1 (24.6)	−5.9 (21.4)	−6.3 (20.7)	−6.0 (21.2)	−4.8 (23.4)	−4.0 (24.8)	−2.4 (27.7)	−0.7 (30.7)	−7.6 (18.3)
Record low °C (°F)	−7.7 (18.1)	−2.8 (27.0)	−5.0 (23.0)	−7.5 (18.5)	−7.2 (19.0)	−11.6 (11.1)	−13.6 (7.5)	−9.8 (14.4)	−8.9 (16.0)	−8.3 (17.1)	−10.4 (13.3)	−4.2 (24.4)	−13.6 (7.5)
Average rainfall mm (inches)	171.9 (6.77)	156.9 (6.18)	161.1 (6.34)	204.5 (8.05)	253.7 (9.99)	271.9 (10.70)	280.2 (11.03)	259.3 (10.21)	283.0 (11.14)	280.4 (11.04)	244.1 (9.61)	245.1 (9.65)	2,812.1 (110.71)
Source: NIWA

== History ==
In 1887 the paramount chief of Ngāti Tūwharetoa, Te Heuheu Tūkino IV, permitted use of the tribe's land including the sacred mountain peaks of Ruapehu, Ngauruhoe and Tongariro – to the people of New Zealand. The agreement was to ensure the area's protection for all time, for all people.

In the early 20th century, the approach to Whakapapa was only for the fit and strong. There were miles upon miles of wild country to cross on foot or horseback, wild rivers to ford and mountainous terrain to navigate. Climbers Bill Mead and Bernard Drake imported the first skis seen in the North Island in 1913, and in July of that year were the first to attempt to ski on Mount Ruapehu. They realised the Whakapapa Valley was "much better than any other area of Ruapehu for skiing as well as for summer parties, if it could only be given road access and huts." In 1919 Bill Mead persuaded the Department of Tourist and Health Resorts to pay for an access road to Whakapapa. The new 'highway' was pushed through towards Mt Ruapehu with the help of labour from the Whakapapa prison camp early in 1925 under the supervision of Dave Dunlop, and in 1925 Sir James Gunson drove the first car to Whakapapa. The Ruapehu Ski Club built a collection of huts, which became Whakapapa Village.

In 1929, the Chateau Tongariro was constructed in the village.

== Features ==
- Chateau Tongariro, a former hotel constructed in 1929, listed as a Category 1 historic place by Heritage New Zealand.
- Fergusson Cottage Complex, listed as a Category 2 historic place by Heritage New Zealand.
- Skotel Alpine Resort, a ski resort constructed in the mid-1980s.
- Tongariro National Park Visitor Centre. The visitor centre includes a bust of Te Heuheu Tūkino IV, the paramount chief of Ngāti Tūwharetoa at the time of the creation of Tongariro National Park.

== Recreation ==
The Whakapapa skifield is located to the south of Whakapapa Village. A number of walking tracks are found in the Whakapapa Village area, including the Mounds Walk, Ridge Track and Silica Rapids Walk.
