= State Highway 46 (New Zealand) =

Road in New Zealand

State Highway 46

Route information
- Maintained by NZ Transport Agency Waka Kotahi
- Length: 19.1 km (11.9 mi)

Major junctions
- East end: SH 1 at Rangipo
- West end: SH 47 (Rotoaira Road) near Papakai

Location
- Country: New Zealand

Highway system
- New Zealand state highways; Motorways and expressways; List
← SH 45	→ SH 47

State Highway 46 (SH 46) is a New Zealand state highway in the central North Island.

== Route ==
For its entire length SH 46 shares the name Lake Rotoaira Road. It begins at Rangipo from SH 1 and travels west to meet SH 47 . This route is commonly used by holidaymakers travelling to the Whakapapa skifield and the Tongariro Crossing. It also forms part of a western bypass of the Desert Road when it can close due to snow.

== History ==
SH 46 originally was gazetted SH 47A. It became SH 47 when the highway shifted along this designation (and SH 47A revoked) however after a few years SH 47 shifted back to its original (and current) location. For a short time it lost its state highway status until 1997 when the highway was gazetted again, this time as a new designation of SH 46.

== See also ==
- List of New Zealand state highways
