= Tourist Hotel Corporation =

New Zealand government tourism company

The Tourist Hotel Corporation (THC) was a New Zealand government company which operated hotels between 1955 and 1990. It aimed to encourage international tourism to New Zealand by providing hotels in tourist spots that would not otherwise be economic. The THC initially owned and operated ten hotels, and several more were later purchased. In 1990, the hotels were sold to the US-based South Pacific Hotels Corporation.

== History ==
New Zealand, by 1901, had the first government-controlled tourism department in the world. This was used to acquire hotels and other visitor amenities.

New Zealand’s Tourist Hotel Corporation (THC) was established in 1955 to manage government-owned hotels. It aimed to encourage the development of international tourism in New Zealand, by providing hotels in areas which were not economic for private hotel companies. It was nominally independent of the government and took over the running of government hotels from the Tourist and Publicity Department.

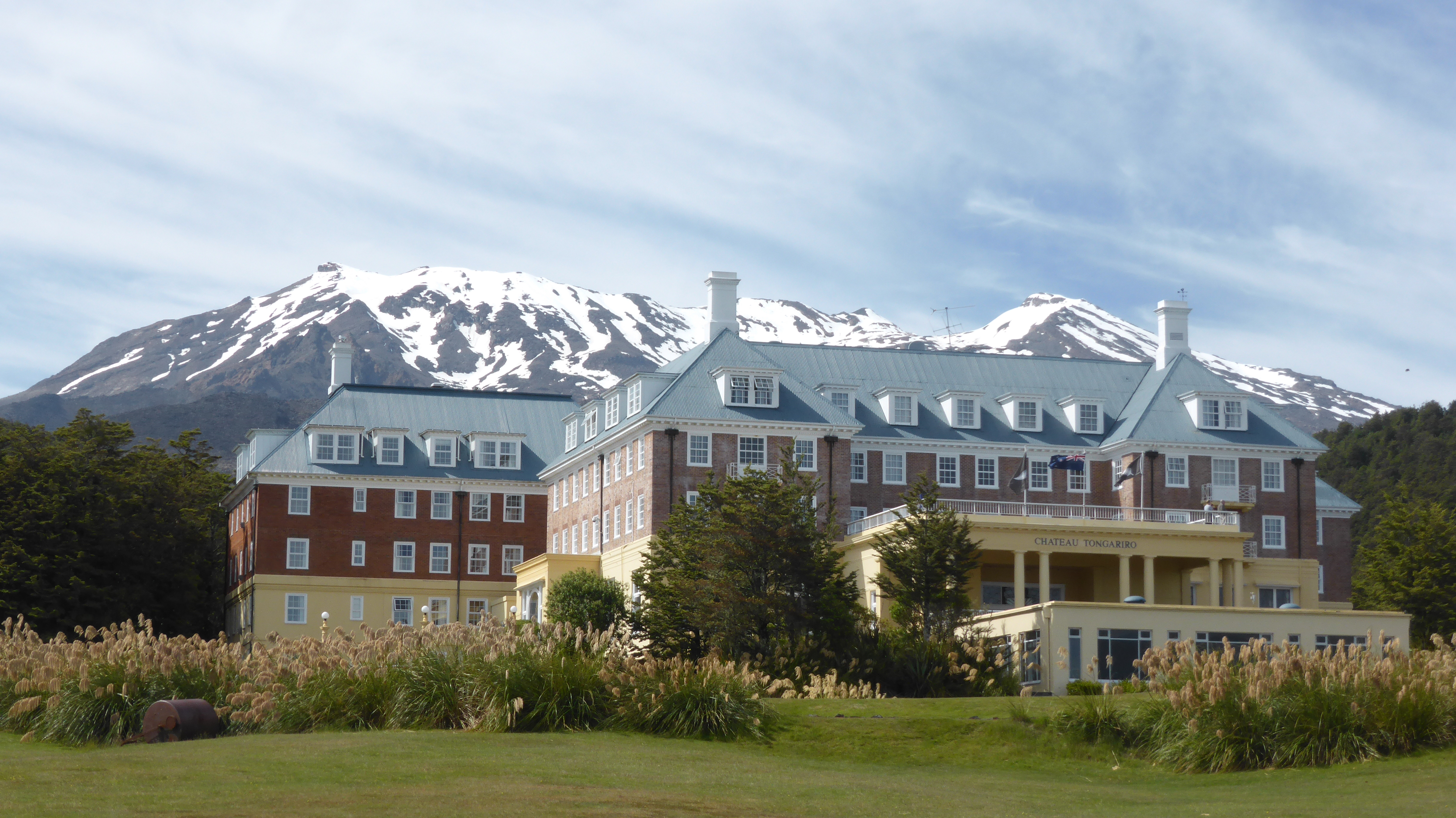
Chateau Tongariro

The THC operated ten hotels when it was established. These were:

- Waitomo Hotel
- Wairakei Hotel
- Tokaanu Hotel
- Chateau Tongariro
- Waikaremoana Lake House
- Glacier Hotel, Franz Josef
- Hermitage Hotel, Mount Cook Village
- Pukaki Hotel, Lake Pukaki
- Milford Hotel
- Te Anau Hotel.

The THC set high standards, including improvements to hospitality and service, food and beverages, and accommodation. It invested in buildings, vehicles, equipment and machinery, and developed the careers and skills of staff.

In the 1960s, the THC expanded its network of hotels to areas such as the Bay of Islands and Wānaka.

In 1974, the Labour government announced that the THC would be able to compete with private enterprise, and be required to provide cheaper accommodation for New Zealand holiday-makers in some resort areas. This was criticised as attempting to deprive private tourist operators of their share of tourism business, and was described as “a further nail in the coffin of the tourist industry” because it allowed the THC to unfairly compete with private operators.

The THC bought a hotel in Rotorua and motels at Mount Cook, which had both been previously privately owned; and made plans to build low-cost accommodation at Mount Cook.

By the late 1980s, the THC was making losses for the New Zealand Government, which announced in its 1988 Budget that it intended to sell the 14 hotels. The THC lost $NZ8 million in 1989 and was losing $NZ650,000 a month. In 1990, the government sold the THC to the US-based South Pacific Hotels Corporation for $NZ73.85 million. South Pacific Hotels Corporation was owned by the Chicago based Pritzker family, who also owned the Hyatt hotel chain. It was the largest hotel management company in the South Pacific.
