= Chateau Tongariro =

Hotel in Tongariro National Park, New Zealand

The Grand Chateau
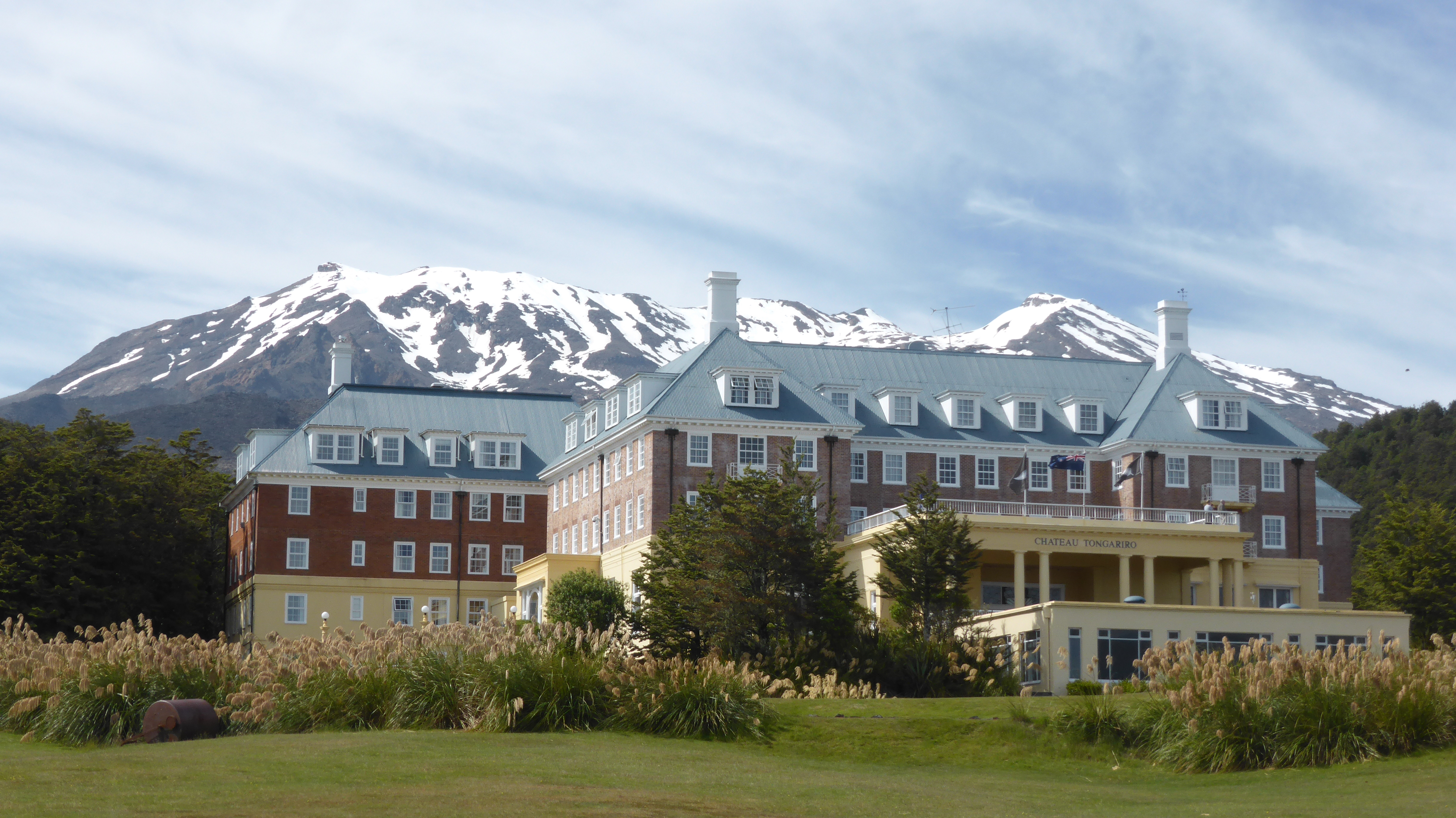
- Alternative names: Chateau Tongariro

General information
- Status: Closed indefinitely
- Type: Hotel
- Architectural style: American Colonial Revival
- Location: Tongariro National Park, New Zealand
- Coordinates: 39°12′00″S 175°32′21″E
- Elevation: 1,120 m (3,670 ft)
- Completed: 1929
- Closed: 5 February 2023

Design and construction
- Architect: Herbert Hall
- Developer: Mt Cook Tourist Company
- Main contractor: Fletcher Construction

Heritage New Zealand – Category 1
- Designated: 6 September 1996
- Reference no.: 7318

The Grand Chateau, also known as the Chateau Tongariro, was a hotel and resort complex located in Whakapapa Village close to Whakapapa skifield on the slopes of Mount Ruapehu, within the boundaries of Tongariro National Park, New Zealand's oldest national park. It is also close to the volcanic peaks of Mount Tongariro and Mount Ngauruhoe. The building was completed in 1929 and, despite extensive refurbishment, still retains much of the style of the pre-Depression era. It is listed by Heritage New Zealand as a Category 1 historic place. The Chateau Tongariro Hotel closed permanently on 5 February 2023, largely because the building has significant seismic risks.

== History ==
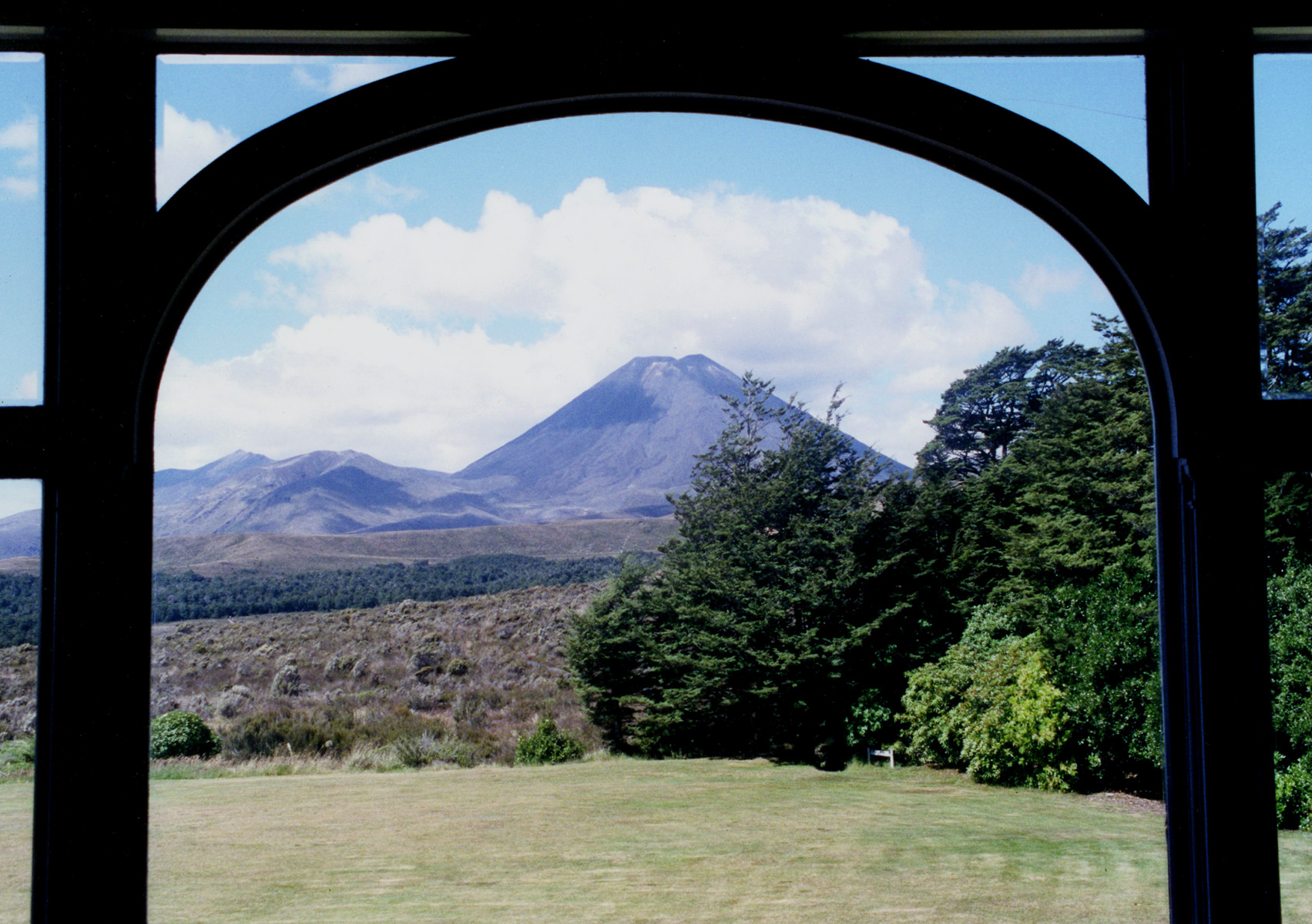
Mount Ngauruhoe from the blue sofa in the sitting area

In 1923, the newly established Tongariro National Park Board investigated a site for a 100-bed hostel in order to encourage tourists to visit the newly formed park, but it was not until 1925 that New Zealand Government, via the National Park Board, followed up this initiative by offering to lease land and lend up to £40,000 to any private company that would build and operate a hotel on the site.

Rodolph Wigley (1881–1946), the managing director of the Mount Cook Tourist Company, took up the option. He formed the Tongariro Park Tourist Company with a vision to build what was at the time known as The Chateau, alongside the original Whakapapa ski huts, on a land lease of 63 acres. To raise capital for the undertaking the company was floated on the sharemarket, where it was poorly subscribed. The company signed a lease with the government on 9 November 1928, a condition of which was that the building had to be erected by 31 March 1930 (barely 17 months away) and that it "cost not less than £40,000 or more than £60,000". Despite only £30,000 of shares being taken up, Wigley let a contract in late 1928 to Fletcher Construction Company, which also involved Fletchers buying 15,000 of shares in the Tongariro Park Tourist Company.

The Chateau was designed by Timaru-based Herbert Hall (1880–1939), architect to the Mount Cook Tourist Company, who modelled his design on the Canadian Resort of Lake Louise. Influenced by the hotels built by the Canadian Pacific Railway, such as the Château Frontenac, he designed a neo-Georgian structure of four stories and basement. The style of the building was not European, despite its name, but American Colonial Revival, a variant of the Georgian Revival style popular between the wars. It is possibly the only building in New Zealand made of reinforced concrete but designed to resemble a traditional Georgian brick building.

The foundation stone was laid on 16 February 1929. Fletchers used a workforce of 120 carpenters and labourers, offering an incentive of free accommodation and a free suit to workers who stayed until the completion of the project. Most of the labourers were recruited from the Waikune Prison, which was the closest neighbour to the construction site. The building was open for guests by 1 August 1929, even though it was still unfurnished. It was officially opened on 13 November 1929 with Fletcher Construction still owed £28,000.

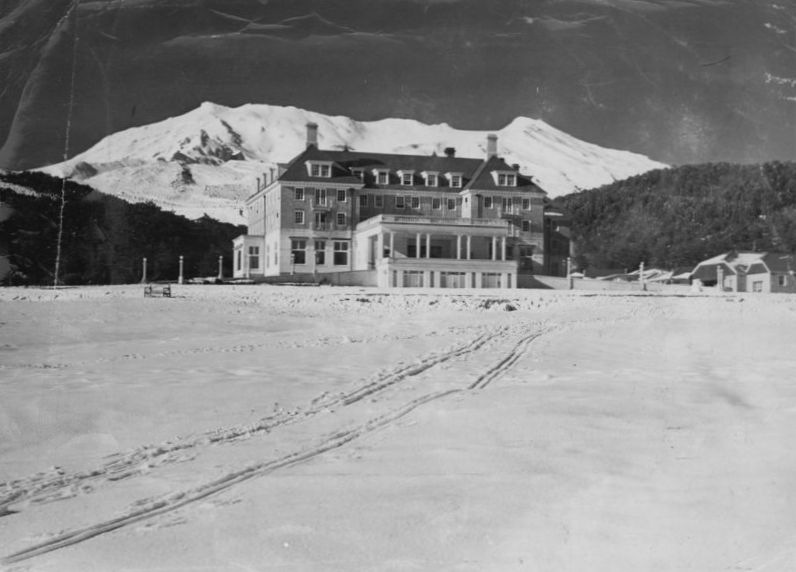
Winter, 1950s

The hotel was lavishly appointed, with panoramic window views, hot and cold running water in every room, and custom-made high-quality furniture. Most of the staff were recruited from overseas. The innovative heating system used enormous boiling-water tanks in the basement and pumped hot water up five storeys; originally coal or oil heated, it was switched to electricity and still operates today. The total cost was £88,000 (well over the contract price) of which the hotel had cost £78,000, while at the request of the Tourist Company another £10,000 had been spent building extra wooden buildings, a garage and a golf course in the front of the hotel. The golf course was designed by an architect serving a prison sentence and built by prison labour. Wigley had led Fletchers to believe that if they overspent the company would be reimbursed by the Mount Cook Tourist Company. Unfortunately due to the Depression it was in difficulties and so would not pay for the increased expenditure. James Fletcher, the head of the company, approached the Prime Minister Sir Joseph Ward and asked him to increase the government loan to £60,000. Ward agreed and Fletcher obtained a promise from Wigley that the bulk of this injection of money would go to pay Fletchers. The Tongariro Park Tourist Company was by now in serious financial trouble, which was not helped by spending lavishly fitting out the hotel. Wigley reneged on the deal and passed on only £10,000. The onset of the depression delayed hopes of a tourism boom; to secure their debt Fletchers put the Tongariro Park Tourist Company into receivership in February 1931, took control of the hotel, and ran it for 3 months before walking away with a loss of £19,000, (which included £1000 of losses incurred during their period of ownership).

=== Government ownership ===
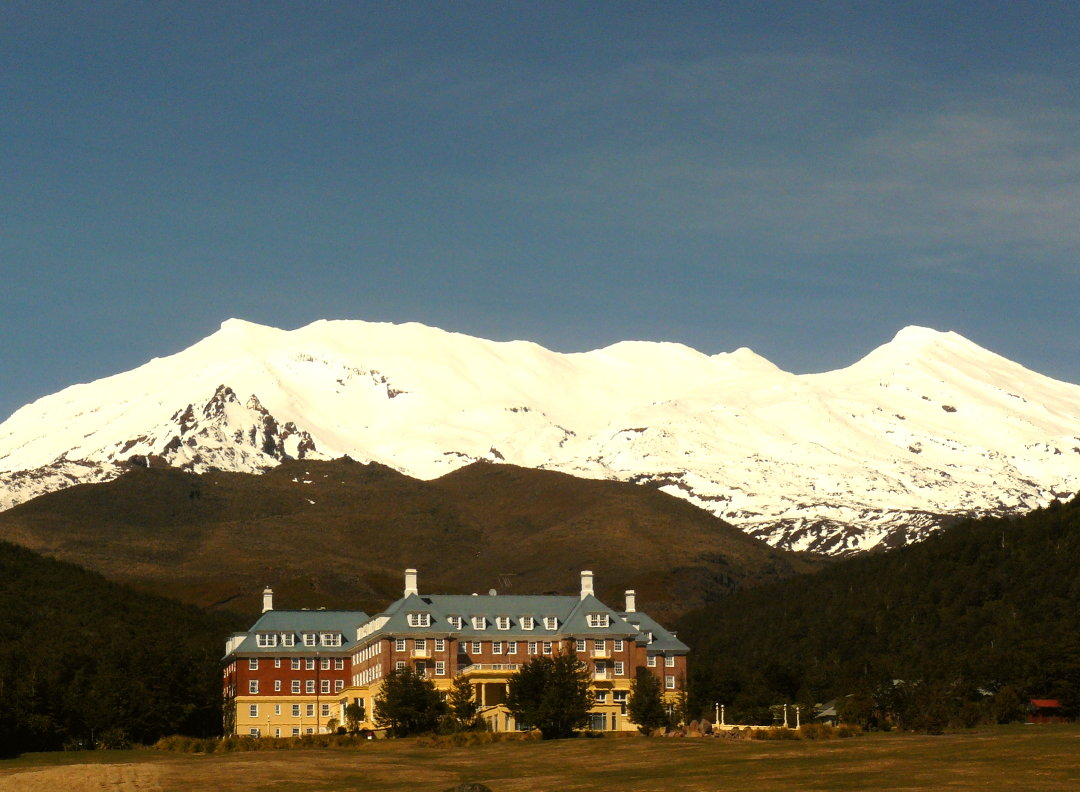
Spring 2009

In 1932 the hotel was taken over by the National Park Board, who quickly transferred the title to the Department of Tourist and Health Resorts, which owned and ran the hotel for the next 26 years. Over this period, the hotel manager not only ran the Chateau, but also Tongariro National Park. The sole park ranger, Alf Cowling, was told "his services were to be at the disposal of the Manager of The Chateau, and that his horse was to be available when not otherwise required for hiring out to guests."

The numbers of skiing tourists declined during World War II, so in 1942 the Chateau was commandeered by the Health Department as an asylum when the Wairarapa earthquakes damaged Porirua Psychiatric Institution in Wellington. In late 1945 Ruapehu erupted over a ten month period, and the heavy showers of ash disrupted the Chateau's power and water supply; the patients were evacuated to Ramarama. The Chateau then served as a rest and recuperation centre for Air Force personnel returning from service in World War II.

After the War was a boom time for Whakapapa skifield, with the installation of ski-tows, chair lifts, and new facilities. In August 1948, newly renovated, Chateau Tongariro reopened to provide accommodation for increasing numbers of visitors. In 1957, control of the hotel passed to the newly created Tourist Hotel Corporation (THC) of New Zealand, which also developed the Whakapapa skifield. The hotel rooms were gradually upgraded and reduced in number from 90 to 64, but the profitability of the Chateau declined.

=== Power supply ===
Power to the complex was initially provided by a coal-fired furnace that heated water, which was then circulated around the complex to provide heating, and a 100 kW hydro power station in the Whakapapanui Stream, which provided power for lighting and cooking.

By the early 1950s the power supplies at the complex were becoming inadequate. In June 1952 the Ministry of Works requested the King Country Electric Power Board to provide a 500 to 600 kW power supply to the Chateau. This resulted in an 8.5-mile long overhead 11 kV transmission line being constructed and commissioned in 1955. This not only supplied power to the chateau but also to the Whakapapa ski field and to several mountain huts on Mount Ruapehu. In the early 1960s a second line was constructed and commissioned in 1964 by the King Country Electric Power Board to improve the reliability of supply to the Chateau and other customers in the area.

=== Private ownership ===
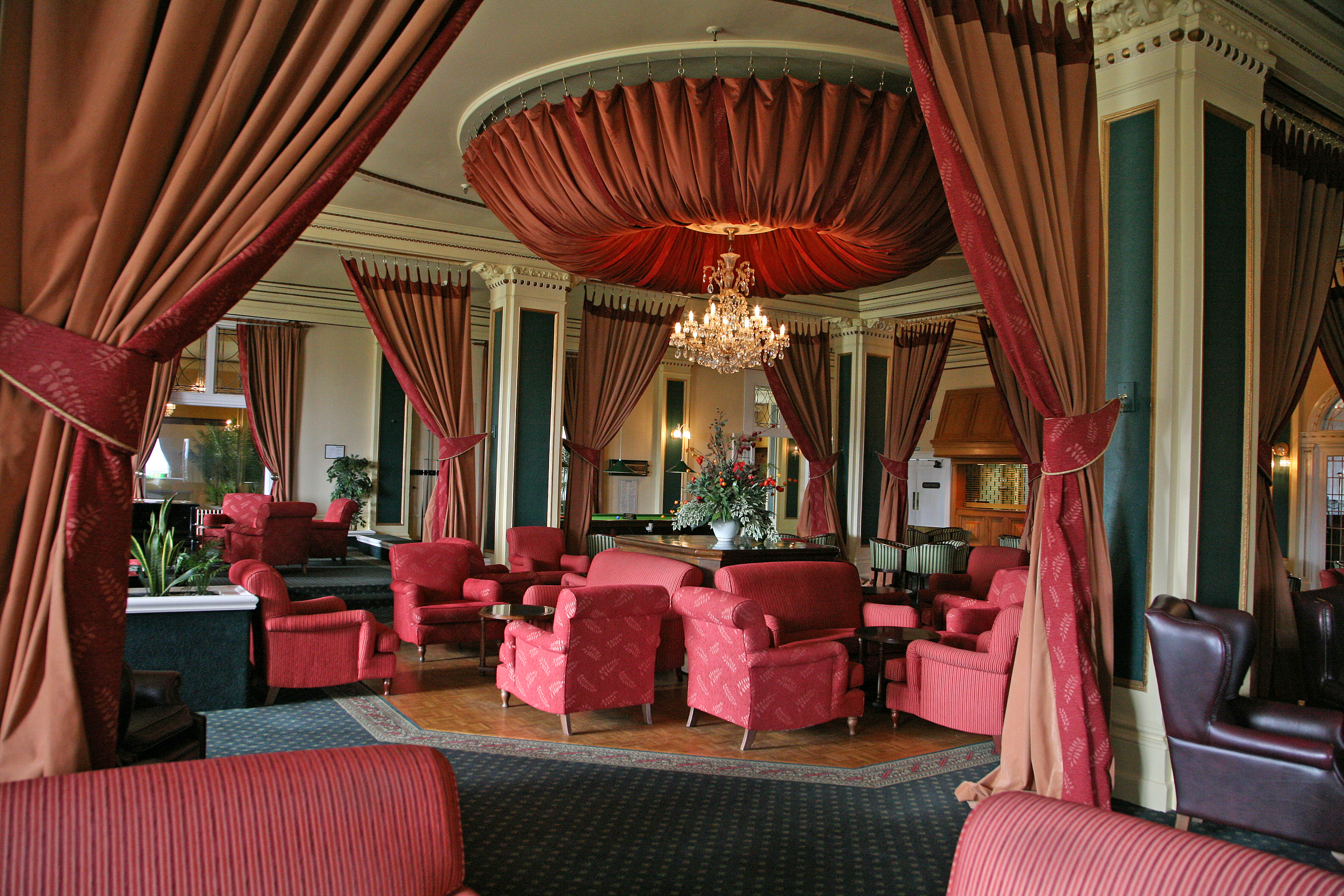
Inside Chateau Tongariro

In 1990, during a period of Government privatisation of assets, the Chateau was sold to Kah New Zealand Limited, a subsidiary of Oriental Holdings Berhad (OHB), a Malaysian-based conglomerate owned by the Loh family, with hotel and restaurant holdings in Singapore and Malaysia. The land belongs to the Crown, and was leased to Kah New Zealand. The new owners invested NZ$3 million in refurbishing the complex and renamed it The Grand Chateau (although it is still widely referred to as Chateau Tongariro). The ski area was sold to a separate company. In 2005 a new five-storey wing costing NZ$6 million and containing 40 rooms and replicating the style of the original building was opened. To avoid disturbing guests, the expansion used a Scandinavian system of modular construction, with the rooms built in Auckland and trucked to the site where they were installed using a crane. The Chateau was operated by Bayview International Hotels and Resorts, which is also a subsidiary of Oriental Holdings Berhad (OHB).

After the 2008 financial crisis, skiing holidays dropped off, and Kah New Zealand posted losses for four straight years, totalling $1.9 million, before making a profit again in 2016. In 2020, in response to the loss of overseas tourists due to the coronavirus epidemic, the Chateau offered discounted ($70 a night) rooms and had over 3500 bookings over May and June, normally quiet months. Tourism New Zealand raised the possibility of resorts like Chateau Tongariro being purchased by the Government, as was done in 1932, but this was rejected.

=== Closure ===
When a long-term lease expired in April 2020, Kah New Zealand switched to monthly leases, rather than take a new long-term lease. On 27 January 2023, it became known that the hotel's future was uncertain over required earthquake strengthening. Four days later, it was announced that Kah was to close the hotel permanently on 5 February due to seismic risks. The company handed over the keys to the Department of Conservation, However, despite Kah New Zealand not renewing the ground lease, as of September 2024 the buildings remain its property.

=== Seismic risk ===
A detailed seismic assessment indicated that the building represented a risk to occupants that was 25 times that of a building complying with standards for new builds. Deficiencies were identified with parapets and chimneys at risk of falling, inadequate bracing, unreinforced masonry infill, and under-strength foundations.

== Awards ==
In 2023, the Western branch of the Te Kāhui Whaihanga New Zealand Institute of Architects recognised the Chateau Tongariro with its Enduring Architecture award. The award citation said:

Its place in New Zealand’s architectural history is more than a building that’s highly recognisable. The Chateau represents architectural excellence in an era when the country was uncertain about its vernacular but aspired to showcase its wonder.

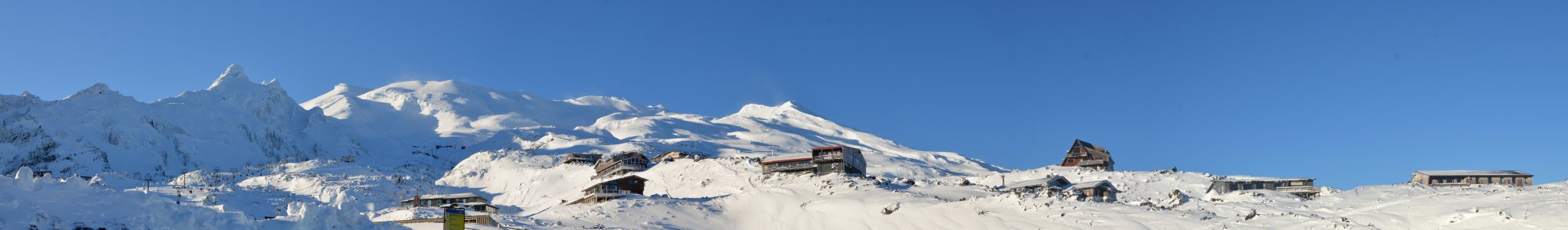
Ski clubs on the Whakapapa ski fields above the Chateau
