= State Highway 48 (New Zealand) =

Road in New Zealand

Coordinates: 39.1833°S 175.5272°E

State Highway 48

Route information
- Maintained by NZ Transport Agency Waka Kotahi
- Length: 6.3 km (3.9 mi)

Major junctions
- Northwest end: SH 47 near National Park
- Southeast end: Whakapapa Village

Location
- Country: New Zealand

Highway system
- New Zealand state highways; Motorways and expressways; List
← SH 47	→ SH 49

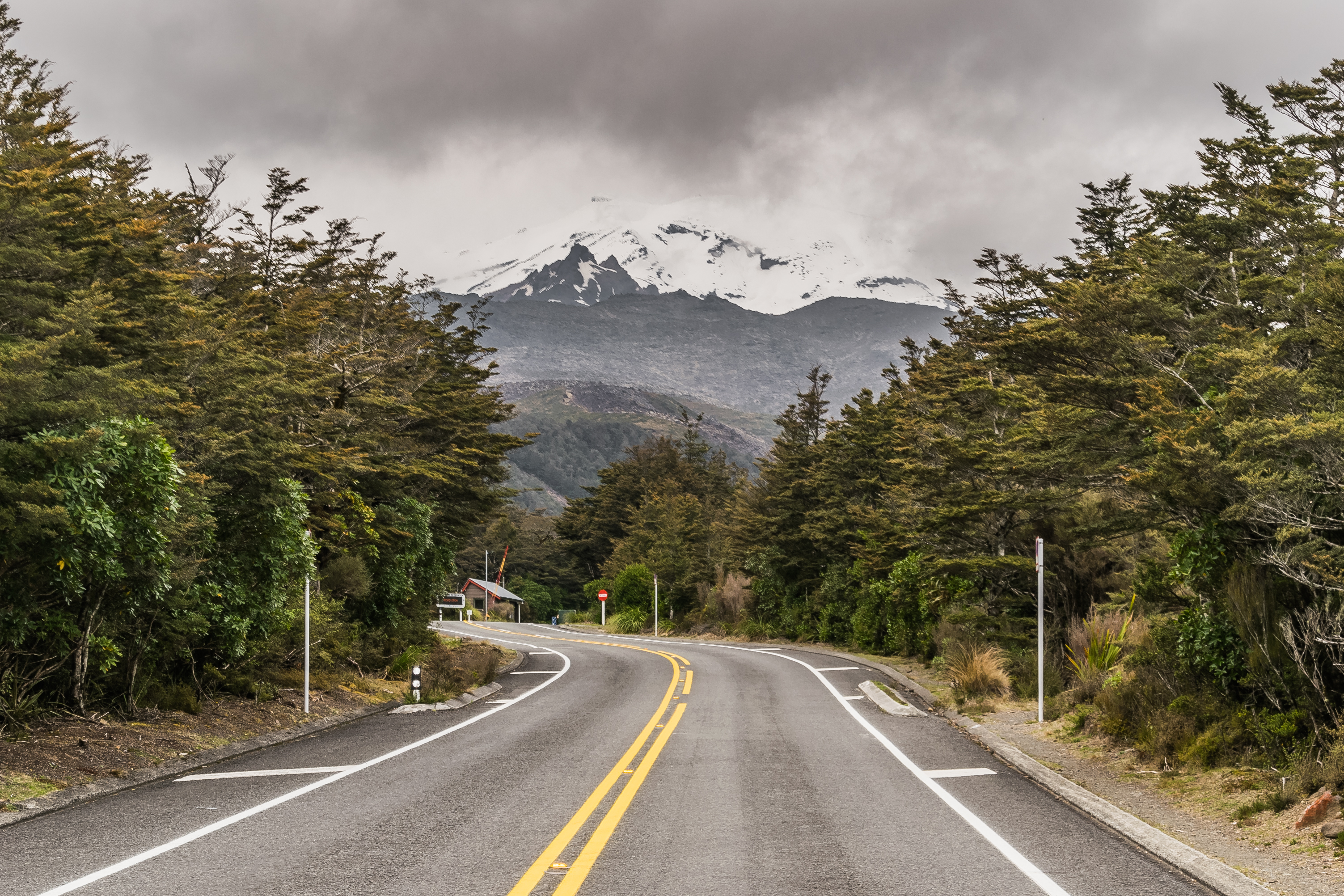

State Highway 48 (SH 48), also known as Bruce Road, is one of New Zealand's shortest state highways. It provides access to Whakapapa Skifield on the slopes of Mount Ruapehu. It is roughly 7 kilometres (4.3 mi) long and, with the exception of the junction with SH 47, it lies entirely within Tongariro National Park. SH 48 includes the highest point of the state highway network, 1,153 metres (3,783 ft) above sea level.

== Route ==
The highway commences at a junction with SH 47, 9 kilometres (5.6 mi) east of National Park. It climbs rapidly, following the route of the young Whakapapa River, a tributary of the Whanganui. The highway terminates in Whakapapa Village at the visitors centre near the intersection of Rehua Place, from where an unclassified road winds the further 6 kilometres up the slopes to the skifield.

== See also ==
- List of New Zealand state highways
