= State Highway 47 (New Zealand) =

Road in New Zealand

State Highway 47

Route information
- Maintained by NZ Transport Agency Waka Kotahi
- Length: 48.7 km (30.3 mi)

Major junctions
- Southwest end: SH 4 at National Park
- SH 48 near National Park; SH 46 (Lake Rotoaira Road) near Papakai
- Northeast end: SH 41 (Tokaanu Road) at Tokaanu

Location
- Country: New Zealand

Highway system
- New Zealand state highways; Motorways and expressways; List
← SH 46	→ SH 48

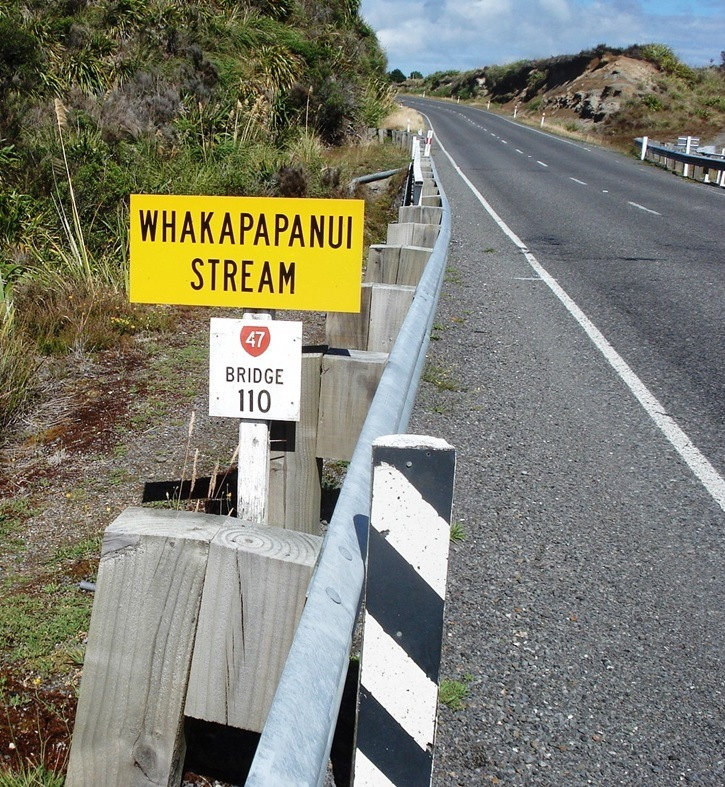
Whakapapanui Stream Bridge (047-00110)

State Highway 47 (SH 47) is a New Zealand state highway in the central North Island. It provides a link from SH 4 at National Park to SH 41 at Tokaanu just west of Tūrangi.

For its entire length, SH 47 is a single carriageway road with one lane in each direction and at-grade intersections and property accesses. There are no significant towns on the route. The New Zealand Transport Agency classifies the section of SH 47 as an arterial route south of the SH 46 intersection and a primary collector route north of the SH 46 intersection.

== Route ==
SH 47 travels in a general northeast direction from National Park across the Tongariro volcanic plateau. 9 km from its starting point it reaches the junction of SH 48 which connects to Whakapapa Village and the ski area on the northern slopes of Mount Ruapehu. A further 14 km north-west is the junction with Lake Rotoaira Road (SH 46), an alternative route to SH 1 and the Desert Road. SH 47 continues for a further 25 km over the Te Ponanga Saddle until it reaches its terminus with SH 41. From here eastbound is a short distance to Tūrangi.

== Route Changes and Former Spurs ==
SH 47 used to have a spur road, SH 47A, which ran from Lake Rotoaira Road to SH 1 at Rangipo. In the 1980s this highway became part of SH 47 and the spur road revoked. A few years later SH 47 was rerouted back to its original route.

In 1997 the formerly designated section of SH 47A regained state highway status as a new designation of SH 46.

== Major junctions ==
Territorial authority	Location	km	mi	Destinations	Notes
Ruapehu District	National Park	0	0.0	SH 4 south – Whanganui; SH 4 north – Taumarunui, Hamilton	SH 47 begins
Ruapehu District		9	5.6	SH 48 – Whakapapa Village	
Ruapehu District		26	16	SH 46 – Rangipo	
Taupō District	Tokaanu	46	29	SH 41 west – Tokaanu, Taumarunui; SH 41 east to SH 1 – Tūrangi, Taupō	SH 47 ends

== See also ==
- List of New Zealand state highways
