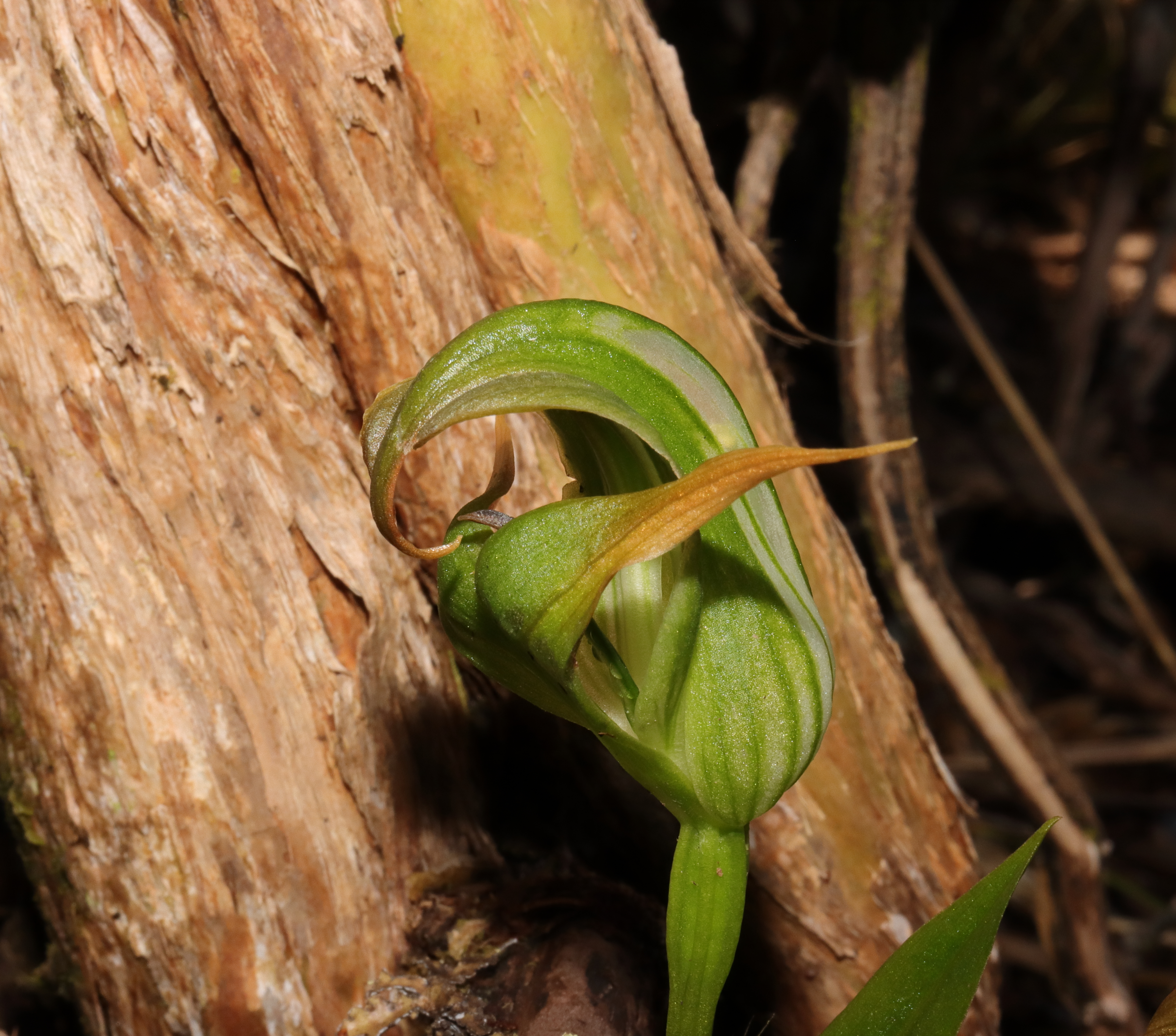
- In the Tararua Forest Park

Scientific classification
- Kingdom: Plantae
- Clade: Tracheophytes
- Clade: Angiosperms
- Clade: Monocots
- Order: Asparagales
- Family: Orchidaceae
- Subfamily: Orchidoideae
- Tribe: Cranichideae
- Genus: Pterostylis
- Species: P. patens

Binomial name
- Pterostylis patens Colenso

Synonyms
- Pterostylis banksii var. patens (Colenso) Hatch

= Pterostylis patens =

Tutukiwi

Species of orchid

Pterostylis patens is a species of greenhood orchid endemic to New Zealand. Flowering have plants spreading leaves on the flowering stem and a single green and white flower with spreading, tapering lateral sepals.

== Description ==
Pterostylis patens, commonly known as tutukiwi or greenhood, is a terrestrial, perennial, deciduous, herb with an underground tuber. Both flowering and non-flowering plants have between four and six erect, lance-shaped leaves which are 50–180 mm (2–7 in) long, 10–20 mm (0.4–0.8 in) wide and grass-like. Flowering plants have a single green flower with white stripes which is prominently inflated near its base. The dorsal sepal and petals are fused, forming a hood or "galea" over the column. The dorsal sepal is 40–50 mm (1.6–2.0 in) tall and curves forward then downward, tapering to a thin tip 30 mm (1 in) long. There is a wide gap between the galea and the lateral sepals which spread apart from each other, with long, thread-like tips up to 30 mm (1 in) long which sometimes almost meet behind the ovary. The labellum is flat in cross-section gently curved and protrudes above the sinus between the lateral sepals. Flowering occurs from February to April.

== Taxonomy and naming ==
Pterostylis patens was first formally described by William Colenso and the description was published in Transactions and Proceedings of the New Zealand Institute in 1886. The specific epithet (patens) is a Latin word meaning "open" or "exposed".

== Distribution and habitat ==
This greenhood mostly grows in montane and subalpine forests, often of Nothofagus and in scrub. It is usually found in damp, shady places and occurs on the North Island south of Mount Pirongia and on the South and Stewart Islands.

== Conservation ==
Pterostylis patens is classed as "not threatened".
