= Whakapapa skifield =

Skifield on Mount Ruapehu in New Zealand

Whakapapa Skifield
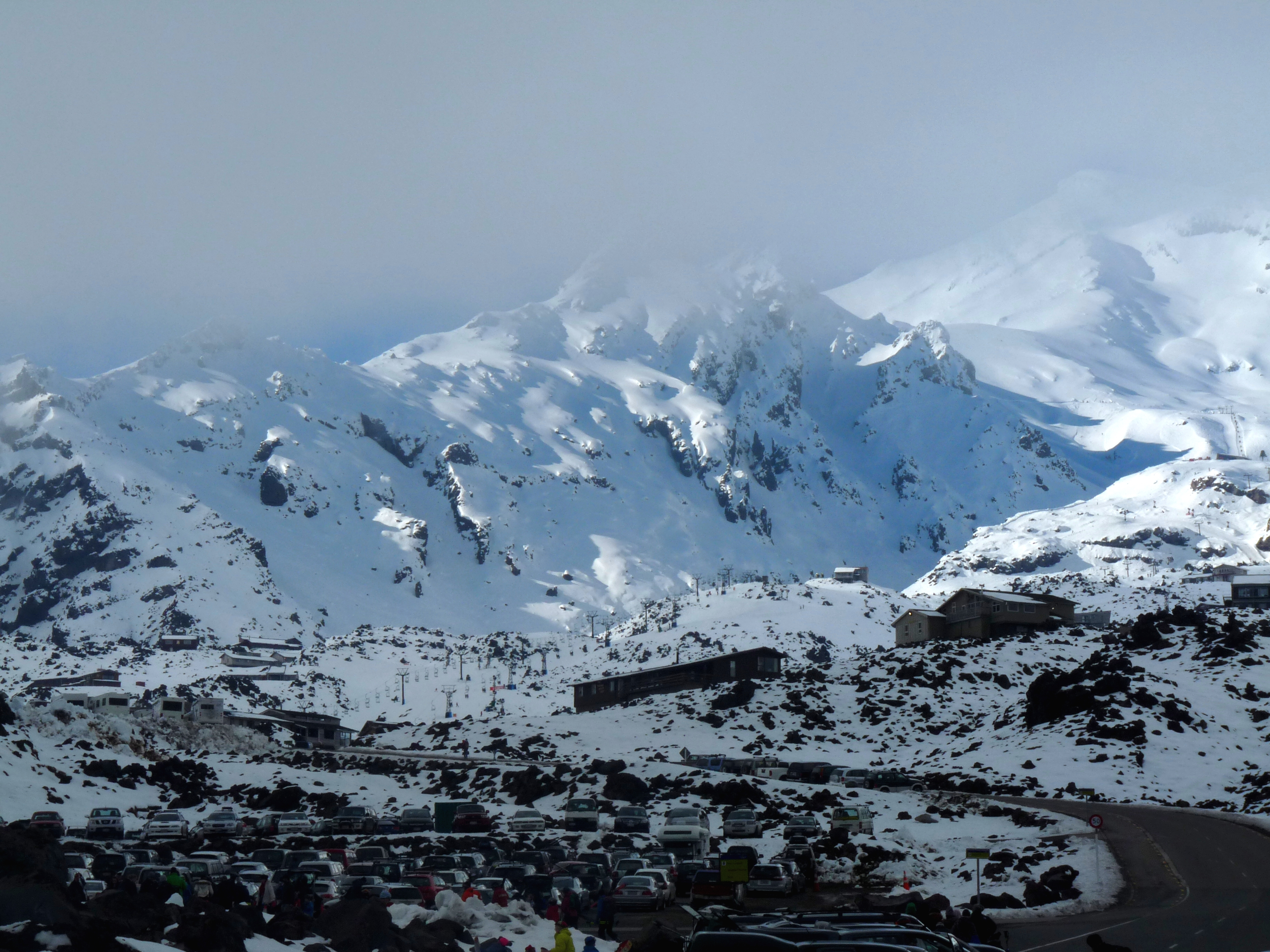
- View from car park

- Whakapapa skifield is in the Manawatū-Whanganui region
- Location: Mt. Ruapehu, Tongariro National Park, New Zealand
- Coordinates: 39.23736°S 175.55696°E
- Top elevation: 2,300 m (7,500 ft)
- Base elevation: 1,630 m (5,350 ft)
- Skiable area: 1,360 acres (550 ha)
- Trails: 67 named
- Lift system: 11 lifts: 1 Detachable Gondola 4 chairs (1 High-Speed Quad, 2 Quad, 1 Double), 3 Magic carpet, 3 T-Bars (Capacity 15,000ph)
- Website: http://www.whakapapa.com/

Whakapapa skifield is a commercial skifield on the northern side of Mount Ruapehu in Tongariro National Park, New Zealand. It is one of three skifields on the mountain, the others being Turoa, which is on Ruapehu's south-western slopes and Tukino on the eastern slopes. The ski season is generally from late June to late October, depending on snow and weather conditions. The terrain at Whakapapa Skifield is divided up as 25% beginner, 50% intermediate and 25% advanced.

Access to the skifield is by Bruce Road, a two-lane, 6 km (3.7-mile) sealed road. Limited accommodation and refreshments are available at the entry to the skifield, and elsewhere on the mountain. Alpine huts are provided for trampers and climbers. Since 2025, it has been operated by Whakapapa Holdings after Ruapehu Alpine Lifts' assets were sold by crown receivers. Chateau Tongariro, which has appeared on several New Zealand stamps, is a feature of Whakapapa village.

== History ==
=== Interwar period ===
The first people to ski the slopes of Ruapehu were Bill Mead and Bernard Drake who purchased a pair of skis from Europe in 1913 and later formed the Ruapehu Ski Club. Bill Salt, Mead, Drake and others helped to then build the first hut on the skifield in 1923, a small corrugated iron shack which still stands to this day. Between 1924 and 1928, prisoners from Waikune made the site accessible, finishing work on State Highway 48 and Bruce Road. Skiing slowly progressed on the skifield, hindered by World War 2 with the road expanded in the 1930s to accommodate more traffic. Some small rope tows were built before the first ski lifts, the first being installed in 1938 at Scoria Flat by the Tourist Department and a further 5–6 more over the following years.

=== 1950s expansion ===
By 1951 skiing had become quite popular and Walter Haensli was granted a license to operate a ski lift at Whakapapa. In 1953 Ruapehu Alpine Lifts was formed and the company purchase the license from Haensli, installing the first chairlift in New Zealand in 1954. This chairlift was built by GMD Müller and was a single seater Diesel-Electric driven lift capable of taking 350 people an hour up to Hut Flat. Sir Edmund Hillary officially opened the chairlift on August 1, 1954. A year later the Staircase T-Bar extended up the Staircase slopes until it was removed in the late 1990s.

Following on from the success, the No.2 Chairlift was opened in May 1956 extending from Hut Flat to the top of Knoll Ridge. This lift was destroyed by an ice storm a week later due to the extreme build-up of rime ice – common in Ruapehu's maritime climate. Over the following years more ski companies opened up and Ski Enterprises Ltd opened a rope tow then a T-Bar on the National Downhill slopes while Happy Ski Valley Ltd commenced operations of rope tows going up Meads Wall.

=== Consolidation: 1970s–1980s ===
During the 1970s many of the rope tows were phased out for more comfortable poma lifts and eventually more chairlifts in the late 70s. The top half of the No.2 Chairlift was moved to run from the base of the Rockgarden, west to the Downhill Ski Club and a two-seater chair replaced the Rockgarden single chair.

The late 1970s and early 1980s signalled a period of fast growth for the ski area with snow groomers purchased in 1977, A double chairlift up the staircase slopes and the first T-Bar on the upper mountain. 1981, 1982 and 1983 saw the installation of the Te Heuheu Valley T-Bar, Knoll Ridge T-Bar and the National Downhill No.2 T-Bar and Double Chairlift. In 1987 the Staircase double chair was moved down to serve the Rockgarden slopes and New Zealand's first High Speed Detachable Quad was installed by Doppelmayr and named the Waterfall Express. The late 80s saw RAL purchase Happy Ski Valley and their license, the No.2 T-Bar moved up the mountain to become the current Far West T-Bar and the first snowmaking system installed in Happy Valley in 1990.

In 1995, skiers were evacuated from the skifield when a small volcanic eruption occurred at the crater lake, ejecting rocks, ash and steam.

=== 21st century ===
In 2002 the snowmaking was expanded to cover the Rockgarden and in 2005 a pump station was built under the Waterfall Express lower terminal to facilitate snowmaking all the way up the staircase slopes to the base of the Waterfall T-Bar.

On 13 February 2009 arson destroyed two buildings at the skifield: the main chalet and an implement shed containing three snow groomers. The damage was estimated at $11 to 12.5 million. The main chalet, the Knoll Ridge Cafe was replaced by a new, more modern, facility slightly lower down the mountain with less visual impact than the old chalet.

In 2016 the Rangatira Express built by Leitner Poma replaced the Centennial and Rockgarden chairs and the second hand Delta Quad replaced the Waterfall T-Bar. In 2019, after a NZD $15m grant from the government Provincial Growth Fund the Sky Waka Gondola was built from the Top of the Bruce up to Knoll Ridge. In the process of doing this, the Waterfall Express which had begun to show its age was removed to make way from the new gondola, completing over 100,000 hours of run time in its 32-year lifespan.

=== Voluntary administration ===
In 2022 following a poor snow season attributed largely to climate change, Ruapehu Alpine Lifts, the parent company of both Whakapapa and Turoa skifields, entered voluntary administration in an attempt to avoid bankruptcy. The company is a not-for-profit business that was established by members of ski clubs in 1953. In August 2022, Ruapehu Alpine Lifts laid off 130 workers and its total debt climbed to over NZ$30 million. The financial situation of Ruapehu Alpine Lifts deteriorated rapidly following disruptions from the COVID-19 pandemic. Efforts to secure additional funds from investors or the New Zealand government initially failed.

However, in December 2022, the government provided a $6 million loan to Ruapehu Alpine Lifts, to help ensure that both Ruapehu skifields could operate in winter 2023. This was in addition to $15 million provided in 2018 from the Provincial Growth Fund.

In mid-March 2024, the Government agreed to a final NZ$7 million bail out of Ruapehu Alpine Lifts to allow the 2024 ski season to proceed at Whakapapa. In addition, the Government agreed to provide NZ$3.05 million in equity and loan funding to enable the sale of the adjacent Tūroa skifield.

In April 2025 a DoC concession was finalised to allow new owners Whakapapa Holdings to operate the ski field for 10 years. In June 2025, iwi filed legal action against the Minister of Conservation and the Department of Conservation for the 10 year concessions granted to Whakapapa Holdings and Pure Turoa. The iwi, Te Patutokotoko, allege that the government failed in its obligations under Ti Tiriti o Waitangi.

== Happy Valley ==
Happy Valley is a large beginner's area at Whakapapa separated from the rest of the skifield in its own little valley and is considered one of the best in the country. The area has a café and ski hire facility, there is also a double chair lift, and four magic carpet lifts including a dedicated snow sledding area. Access to Happy Valley is by way of two glass-enclosed 26 person elevators which travel 22m down into the canyon.

== Lifts ==
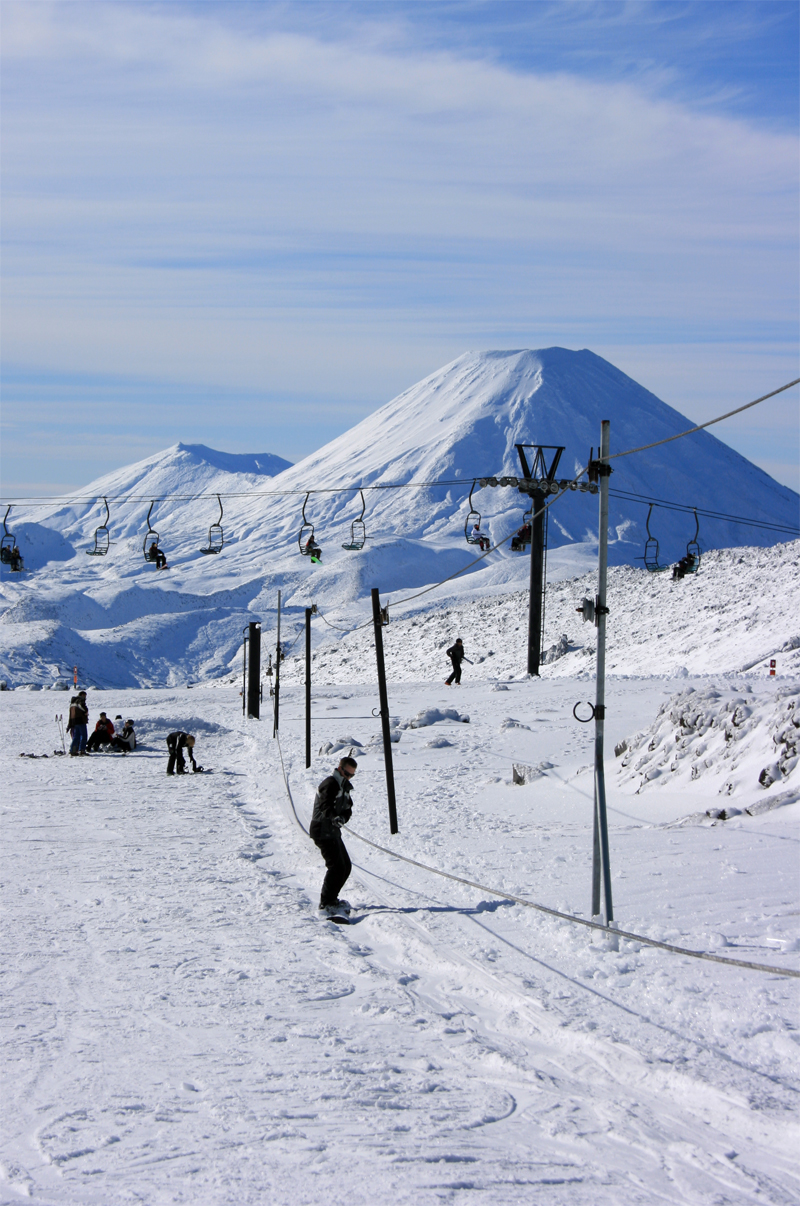
Hut Flat Rope Tow (removed after 2014 season) with Mount Ngauruhoe behind

There is a new lift systems that has been proposed. The Knoll ridge Express will replace the Knoll Ridge T-Bar and possible the Valley T-Bar as well, starting from the top of the Rangatira Express and ending in a similar spot to where the Knoll Ridge T-Bar's top terminal is. If the plan goes ahead it will be a six seater with a top speed of 5 meters per second and the ability to transport 3,200 people per hour. A new gondola was installed for the 2019 season, called the Sky Waka, that can transport over 3000 people an hour from the base area at an elevation of 1630m to the Knoll Ridge Cafe at 2020m to provide access to the upper mountain.

Lift Name	Type	Ride Time	Starting elevation	Vertical Rise	Capacity
Double Happy Chair	Double	4 min	1580m	25m
Happy Valley elevator	Twin Elevator	15 seconds	1605m	15m
Happy Valley Magic Carpet	Magic Carpet	3 min	1590m	15m
Rangatira Express	Detachable Quad	3 min	1625m	137m	2800 people per hour
West Ridge Quad	Quad	11 min	1820m	255m	1740 people per hour
Sky Waka Gondola	Gondola	6 min	1625m	390m	3000 people per hour
Delta Quad	Quad fixed grip chair	5 min	1940m	115m	1600 people per hour
Knoll Ridge T-Bar	T-Bar	10 min	2000m	250m	1420 people per hour
Valley T-Bar	T-Bar	8 min	1980m	190m	1420 people per hour
Far West T-Bar	T-Bar	10 min	2005m	315m	1420 people per hour

== Weather ==
Weather conditions can be changeable over the day, and mountain visitors are advised to be prepared and carry basic survival equipment. Although severe weather is unusual and generally forecast, it has claimed several lives over the years, including a party of soldiers undergoing winter survival training in 1990. The same storm also trapped a Japanese tourist when the weather unexpectedly closed in on him, but he built a snow cave and sheltered in it until he was rescued days later.

On July 5, 2003, about 350 skiers and 70 skifield staff were trapped on the mountain overnight at Top o'the Bruce when a sudden snow storm blew up and within a few minutes made the access road too dangerous to descend. They spent the night in relative comfort and all descended safely the next morning. Such rapidly changing conditions are typical of the weather on New Zealand mountains. Again on Saturday July 26, 2008, skiers and staff were trapped on the mountain overnight when a fast approaching storm caused the skifield to be closed at 10:30 am and made the road too dangerous for cars without chains or 4WD to leave the area. By 3 pm there were still over 100 cars in the Whakapapa car park and those who had not been able to leave by that point were told to settle in for the night. All cars were able to leave safely the next morning.

== Ski Clubs ==
There are a total of 47 Ski Clubs located between the Top of the Bruce and Hut Flat, with the majority of them being located around the loop road. Many of these clubs have been around for over 50 years and have anywhere between 200 and 1000 members. The clubs often have either a custodian who is in charge of coordinating the lodge during the winter season and cooking meals, while others operate on a member system where they are in charge of cooking meals or providing personal food. Accommodation is provided in combined bunkroom style and on average 32 beds per club.

== Iwikau climate ==
Being more than 400 metres higher than Whakapapa Village, Iwikau is considerably cooler year-round with an average annual temperature of 5.5 °C. Maximum temperatures vary from 16.6 °C in February to 3.6 °C in July. Minimum temperatures range from 5.2 °C in February to −3.1 °C in July. The climate is classified as Cfc, or sub-polar oceanic. The driest month is February, with 196 mm of precipitation, and the wettest month is July, with 399 mm of precipitation. Annually, 3733 mm of precipitation falls on Iwikau.

Climate data for Iwikau, 1626 m
Month	Jan	Feb	Mar	Apr	May	Jun	Jul	Aug	Sep	Oct	Nov	Dec	Year
Mean daily maximum °C (°F)	16.4 (61.5)	16.6 (61.9)	14.2 (57.6)	10.8 (51.4)	7.2 (45.0)	4.6 (40.3)	3.6 (38.5)	4.4 (39.9)	6.6 (43.9)	9.4 (48.9)	11.8 (53.2)	14.3 (57.7)	10.0 (50.0)
Daily mean °C (°F)	10.7 (51.3)	10.9 (51.6)	9.1 (48.4)	6.3 (43.3)	3.3 (37.9)	1.2 (34.2)	0.2 (32.4)	0.9 (33.6)	2.8 (37.0)	5.0 (41.0)	6.8 (44.2)	9.0 (48.2)	5.5 (41.9)
Mean daily minimum °C (°F)	5.1 (41.2)	5.2 (41.4)	4.1 (39.4)	1.8 (35.2)	−0.5 (31.1)	−2.1 (28.2)	−3.1 (26.4)	−2.5 (27.5)	−1 (30)	0.6 (33.1)	1.9 (35.4)	3.8 (38.8)	1.1 (34.0)
Average rainfall mm (inches)	236.0 (9.29)	196.0 (7.72)	283.0 (11.14)	281.0 (11.06)	353.0 (13.90)	383.0 (15.08)	399.0 (15.71)	383.0 (15.08)	362.0 (14.25)	302.0 (11.89)	265.0 (10.43)	290.0 (11.42)	3,733 (146.97)
Source: Climate-data.org

== Other activities ==
=== Sledding at Whakapapa ===
Across from Happy Valley is a tubing park called 'the sliding zone'. It is a large area dedicated to tubing, and within walking distance from the base area.

=== Guided Crater Lake Walks ===
Offered in the summer months of the year, there is an option to view the volcanic crater lake at the top of the mountain. Visitors take a chairlift ride up to 2020m, from which a guide takes visitors on a 6-hour walk around the lake.
