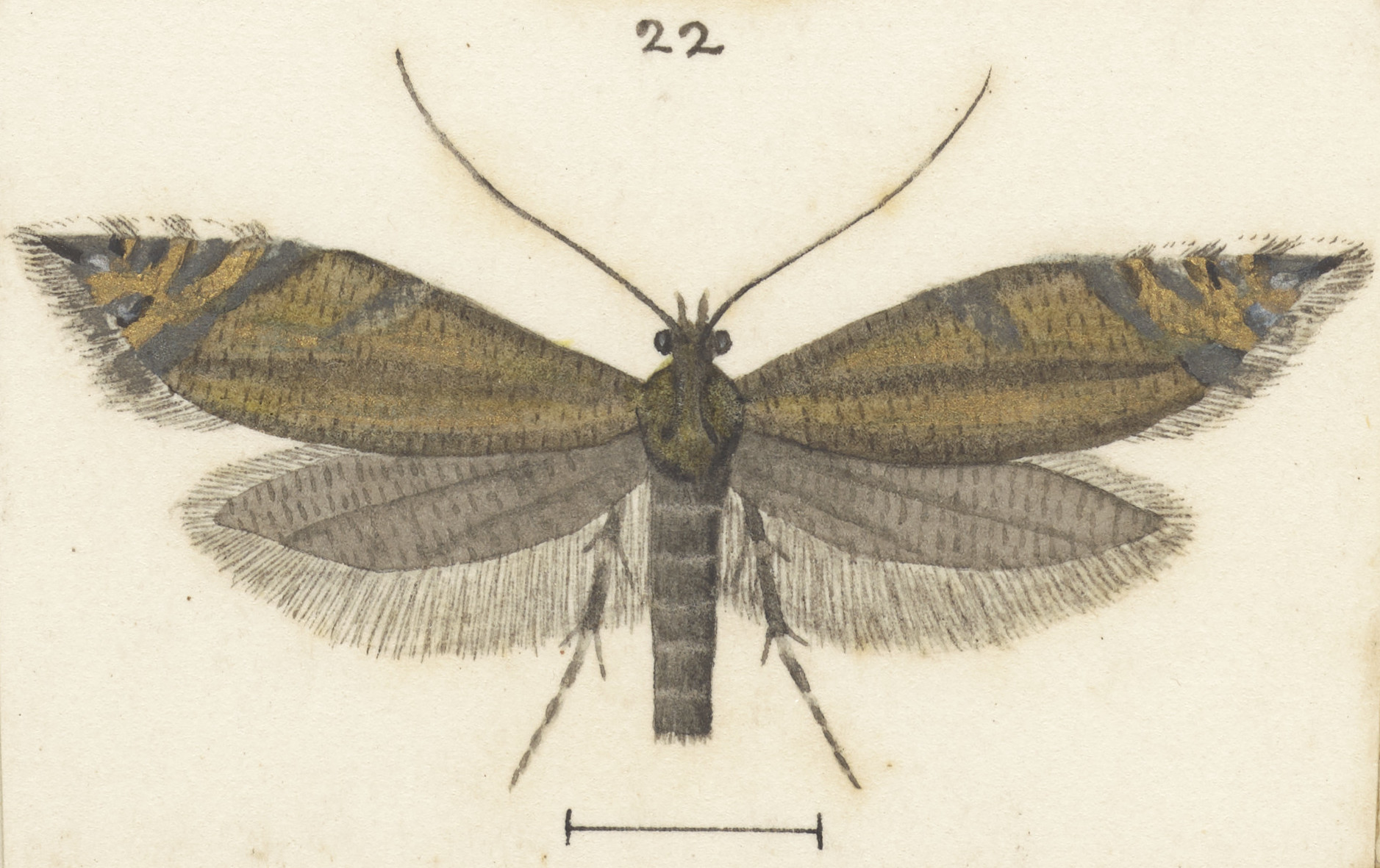
- Illustration of male

Scientific classification
- Kingdom: Animalia
- Phylum: Arthropoda
- Clade: Pancrustacea
- Class: Insecta
- Order: Lepidoptera
- Family: Glyphipterigidae
- Genus: Glyphipterix
- Species: G. aerifera

Binomial name
- Glyphipterix aerifera Meyrick, 1912

= Glyphipterix aerifera =

Species of moth endemic to New Zealand

Glyphipterix aerifera is a species of sedge moth in the genus Glyphipterix. It was first described by Edward Meyrick in 1912. It is endemic to New Zealand and has been observed in the North Island, on Mount Ruapehu. This species inhabits open glades amongst stunted subalpine scrub on the upper edge of the forest in mountainous terrain. Adults are day flying and are on the wing in January.

== Taxonomy ==
This species was first described by Edward Meyrick in 1912 using a specimen collected by George Hudson on Mount Ruapehu at 4,500 feet (1,400 m) in January. George Hudson discussed and illustrated this species under this name in his 1928 book The butterflies and moths of New Zealand. The holotype is held at the Natural History Museum, London.

== Description ==
Meyrick described the female of the species as follows:

♀. 11 mm. Head and thorax shining bronze. Palpi on basal and second joints with three whorls of black white-tipped scales, terminal joint white with black anterior and interior streaks. Abdomen grey. Forewings elongate, costa gently arched, apex tolerably pointed, termen somewhat rounded, rather strongly oblique ; bright shining bronze ; markings pale golden-metallic ; five slender streaks from costa, first from middle, short, oblique, indistinct, others edged with a few blackish scales, second and third rather oblique, reaching half across wing, fourth and fifth short, transverse ; a transverse mark from tornus, not reaching half across wing, lying between second and third costal streaks and not meeting either ; small spots on termen above and below middle: cilia bronzy, on outer half grey, with pale golden-metallic basal spots on terminal markings. Hindwings rather dark grey ; cilia grey, towards tips paler.

Hudson regarded this species as "inconspicuous".

== Distribution ==
G. aerifera is endemic to New Zealand and has been observed in the North Island.

== Habitat ==
This species inhabits open glades amongst stunted subalpine scrub on the upper edge of the forest in mountainous terrain.

== Behaviour ==
G. aerifera has been observed on the wing in January. Adults are day flying and are active in hot sunshine.
