= Big Mountain Short Film Festival =

Film festival in New Zealand

Coordinates: 39.417487°S 175.398913°E

The Big Mountain Short Film Festival is a short film festival based in Ohakune, New Zealand designed to encourage and celebrate creative short film making and storytelling. Entry is free and open to filmmakers internationally, who are encouraged to use maximum creativity on minimum budget. In addition to screening short films, the festival also features professional guest speakers offering tips and techniques on an assortment of topics of particular interest to low and no-budget filmmakers.

The festival was run as a three-day event in 2006 and 2007, before being reformatted as a single-day event, beginning in 2008.

== History ==
The first annual Big Mountain Short Film Festival was held on October 20–22, 2006 at the Ohakune Cinema on Goldfinch Street in Ohakune. It was co-founded by filmmakers Jeff Bollow and Bret Gibson as a way to encourage and inspire filmmaking in New Zealand.

From the beginning, the Big Mountain Short Film Festival was conceived as an entirely free event, both for filmmakers submitting their films, and for audiences attending the festival.

== The 2006 festival ==
=== Overview ===
The festival screened 34 short films from 14 countries, 6 educational interviews with industry professionals, the full presentation of the ATOM Award-winning Making Fantastic Short Films, and two live presentations.

Short films were screened in two distinct categories. Program A included short films made with budgets of over $1,000 or which are made with professional equipment and crews. Program B included short films made with budgets of less than $1,000 which are made with home video cameras and personal computer editing systems

=== Winning films ===
Award	Title	Director	Country
The Big Mountain (Best Short Film Overall)	Domestic	Katie Hides	Australia
The Flurry (Audience Favourite)	Elemenopee	Natalia Amoore	Australia
Best Director (Program A)	Big Bad Wolves	Rajneel Singh	New Zealand
Best Story	Crossing	Riad Galayini	USA
The Rumble (Best short film made for under $100)	Coucou Clock	Francois Cailleau	France
Best Emerging Director (Program B)	The Hit	Campbell Cooley	New Zealand
Best Animation	Coucou Clock	Francois Cailleau	France

== The 2007 festival ==
=== Overview ===
The festival returned to the Ohakune Cinema on October 19–21, 2007. It featured 28 short films from 15 countries, educational content from New Zealand and international filmmakers, and live Q&A with Paul Davis, producer of New Zealand feature films "Sione's Wedding" and "We're Here to Help".

=== Winning films ===
Award	Title	Director	Country
The Big Mountain (Best Short Film Overall)	Boletos Por Favor	Lucas Figueroa	Spain
The Flurry (Audience favorite)	Night of the Hell Hamsters	Paul Campion	UK/New Zealand
Best Director (Program A)	Before and After Kissing Maria	Ramon Alos	Spain
Best Story	Before and After Kissing Maria	Ramon Alos	Spain
The Rumble (Best short film made for under $100)	7 of Diamonds	Ollie Neas & Sam Bigwood	New Zealand
Best Emerging Director (Program B)	Schaffenskrise	Felix Krisai	Austria
Best Animation	Coffeeee	Nolan	Canada

== The 2008 festival ==
=== Overview ===
In 2008, the festival shifted gears, and returned to Ohakune as a single-day event on October 25, 2008. It featured 28 short films from 13 countries.

=== Winning films ===
Award	Title	Director	Country
The Big Mountain (Best Short Film Overall)	Against the Wind	Dan Masucci	USA
The Flurry (Audience Favourite), tie	Half a Horse	Hewison Dickson Faulkner	New Zealand
The Flurry (Audience Favourite), tie	Dictaphone Lament	unknown	unknown
Best Story	Half a Horse	Hewison Dickson Faulkner	New Zealand
Best Cinematography	Against the Wind	Joe Masucci	USA
Best Animation	It Was a Dark and Scary Night	L Dickenson & S C Jaffe	New Zealand

== The 2009 festival ==
=== Overview ===
In 2009, the festival returned to Ohakune as a single-day event on October 24, 2009.

=== Winning films ===
Award	Title	Country
Best Director	E Finita La Commedia	France
Best Story	Coffin Call	England
Audience Favorite	AIE	Belgium
Best Animation	Glonk! Klank!	France
Best Short Under $100	Space Junk	New Zealand

== The 2010 festival ==
The 5th Annual festival is scheduled to return to Ohakune Cinema as a single-day event on October 23, 2010.

== Notable participants ==
In addition to the international films featuring emerging and famous filmmakers from around the world, the following people have participated in the festival, either as speakers, live presenters, featured filmmakers or interview subjects:

- Alun Bollinger, Cinematographer of Heavenly Creatures
- David Coulson, Editor of Whale Rider
- Dale G Bradley, Director/Producer of over 20 films in New Zealand
- Paul Davis, Producer of Sione's Wedding and We're Here to Help
- Susan Parker, Production Manager of The Last Samurai and In My Father's Den
- Jackie Dennis, Music Licensing, Mushroom Music NZ
