= Turoa =

Ski field in New Zealand

Tūroa Skifield
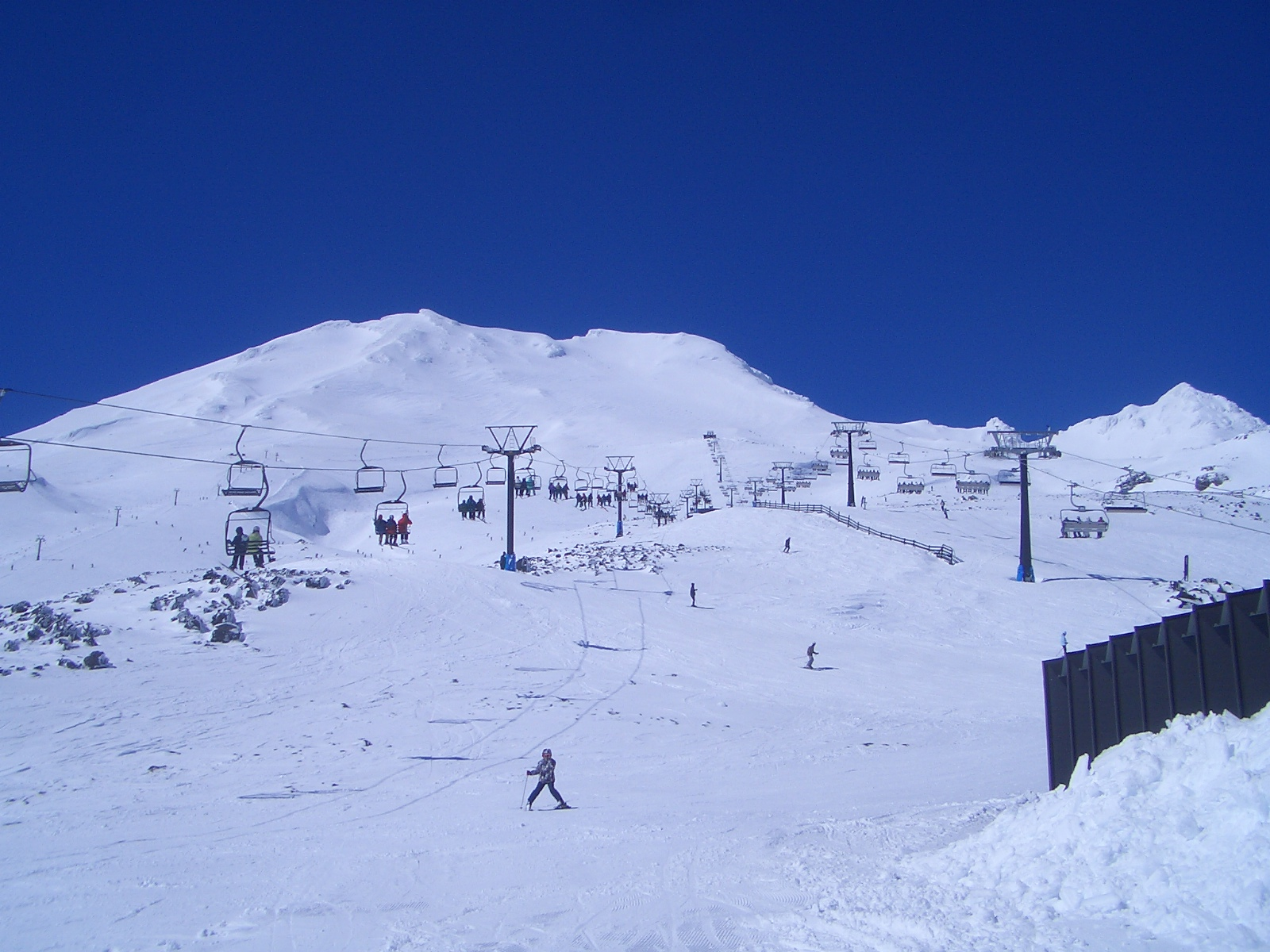
- Interactive map of Tūroa Skifield
- Location: Mt. Ruapehu, Tongariro National Park, New Zealand
- Coordinates: 39.30456°S 175.52731°E
- Top elevation: 2,322 m (7,618 ft)
- Base elevation: 1,623 m (5,325 ft)
- Skiable area: 1,235 acres (500 ha)
- Trails: 34 named
- Lift system: 8 lifts: 5 chairs (1 Detachable Sixpack, 2 Quads, 2 Triple), 2 Platter lifts, 1 Magic carpet
- Website: pureturoa.nz\

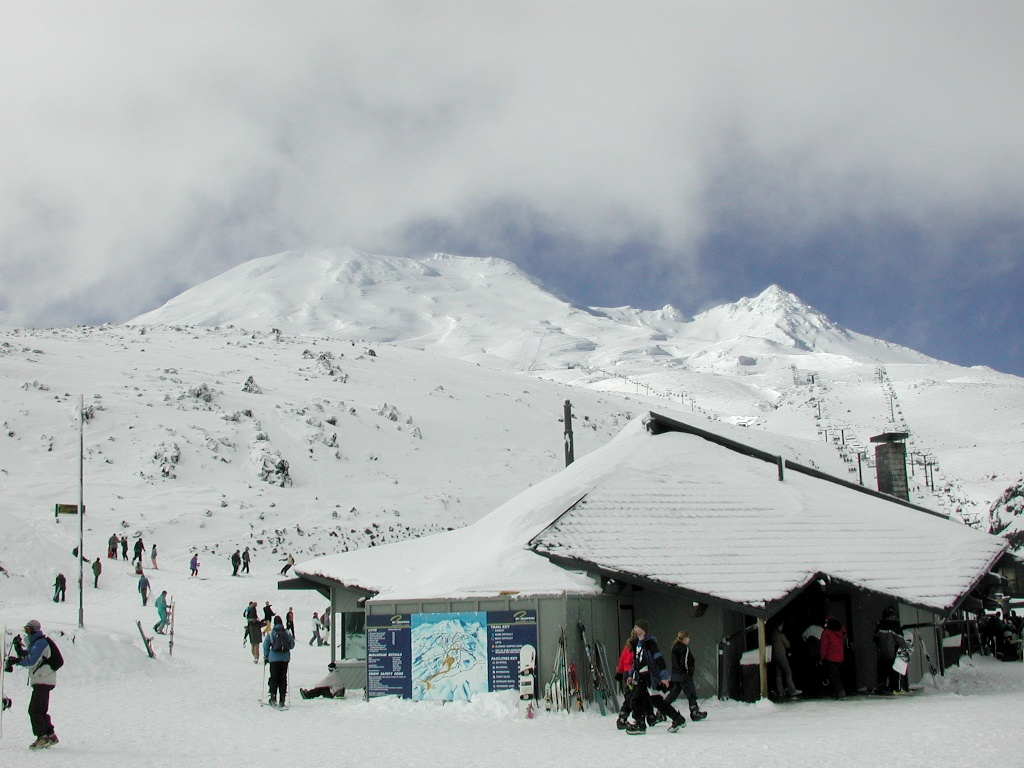
Base of Tūroa skifield in winter

Tūroa (or Turoa (Note: As of July 2024 Patutokotoko had not agreed to allow the rights of the name Tūroa to be commercialised.)) is a skifield on the south western side of Mount Ruapehu, the highest mountain in the North Island of New Zealand, in Tongariro National Park. The area has been used for skiing since before the completion of the Mountain Road; however, the first commercial field was ready in 1965, but with a poor snow season did not operate. It was not until 1966 that there was adequate snow to enable operations. The rope tow and supporting buildings were owned and operated by June and John Broadbent from 1966 to 1973. Broadbent was a contractor from Auckland and also helped with the construction of the mountain road. Keen skiers took the 30 minute walk from the road end up to the ski field (Broadbent Flat) where they enjoyed the 1500 foot long rope tow and occasional night skiing. DOC offered expressions of interest for the operation of a large commercial field and lifts and facilities were opened in 1978. The facilities were owned and operated by Ruapehu Alpine Lifts from 2000, a company that also owned the nearby Whakapapa skifield, also on Mt. Ruapehu. After liquidation of Ruapehu Alpine Lifts in 2023, the field was purchased by Pure Turoa. The field has been operated by Pure Turoa since April 2024.

== Features ==
There are two beginner areas, and many intermediate and advanced trails. The upper field is a mix of natural pipes, steep drops, fast plains, and easier slopes, along with several terrain parks. The lower field contains the field's single narrow beginner trail, Clarry's Track, and a few other intermediate trails. They also serve as access to the base area from the upper mountain, and are often crowded. The field is 496 hectares (1,230 acres) and has about a 690 metres (2,260 feet) vertical drop from the top chair to the skifield base.

On some days, it is possible to hike to the top of the mountain with skis or a snowboard, view the Crater Lake, then ski back down to the field, or to Whakapapa. On a clear day Mount Taranaki can be seen.

== Access ==
The skifield is reached via the Mountain Road from the town of Ohakune. The Mountain Road was built by locals from Ohakune, mostly during weekends after they formed the Mountain Road Association in 1952. Their aim was to open Ruapehu's southern slopes for skiing, partly as a replacement industry for the decline in logging which had sustained the town for the previous decades. The now renamed Ministry of Works helped with the road on one occasion by 'misplacing' a culvert destined for another roading project. The 17 kilometre road was opened in 1963, reached Turoa by 1967 and became a legal road in 1973. It winds up through spectacular native forest before breaking out above the tree line and finishes at a complex of carparks below the bottom chairlift.

== History ==
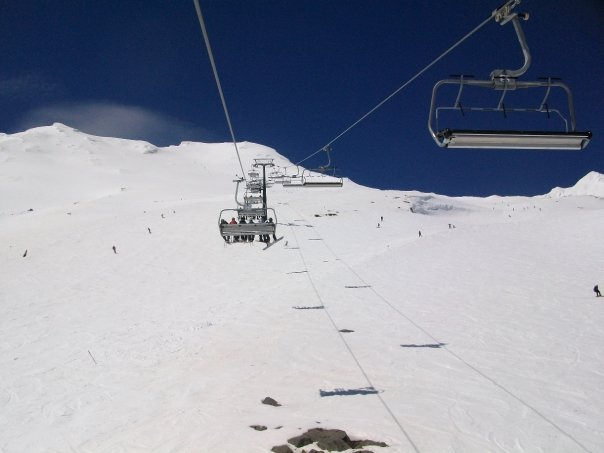
The High Noon Express

Night skiing for paying customers was trialled in 1986.

In 1995, skiers were evacuated from the skifield when a small volcanic eruption occurred at the crater lake, ejecting rocks, ash and steam.

In 2007, a high speed six-seater chairlift, the High Noon Express was installed, replacing an existing T-bar to the top of the skifield. The lift had several faults after being installed, such as cable derailments. In winter of 2010, two pylons on the lift collapsed, and the lift was redesigned with 15 new shorter pylons instead of 10 higher pylons in the original design and was open 2011 season. The redesign required relocating an older fixed grip quad chair, the High Flyer, which previously passed under the lift.

There was an accidental diesel spill in 2013 and after this the number of tanks and total storage was reduced.

=== Ruapehu Alpine Lifts ===
In 2022 following a poor snow season attributed largely to climate change, Ruapehu Alpine Lifts, the parent company of both Whakapapa and Turoa skifields, entered voluntary administration in an attempt to avoid bankruptcy. The company is a not-for-profit business that was established by members of ski clubs in 1953. In August 2022, Ruapehu Alpine Lifts laid off 130 workers and its total debt climbed to over NZ$30 million. The financial situation of Ruapehu Alpine Lifts deteriorated rapidly following disruptions from the COVID-19 pandemic. Efforts to secure additional funds from investors or the New Zealand government initially failed.

However, in December 2022, the government provided a $6 million loan to Ruapehu Alpine Lifts, to help ensure that both Ruapehu skifields could operate in winter 2023. This was in addition to $15 million provided in 2018 from the Provincial Growth Fund.

=== Pure Turoa ===
After the liquidation of Ruapehu Alpine Lifts in 2023, the ski area was purchased by Pure Turoa in March 2024. A ten-year Department of Conservation concession was obtained by May 2024, and the ski area reopened for the 2024 season in June.

The concession required that the Nga Wai Heke quad chairlift was removed. The concession granting process was later identified as having flawed engagement with the Iwi. An outstanding issue is if managed retreat in relation to skifield activities is appropriate.

As of 2023 the Tūroa and Whakapapa Ski Areas on Mount Ruapehu were the only commercial ski areas within the North Island of New Zealand.

== Lifts ==
There are three proposed ski lifts at Turoa, which are due to be complete before 2030. A new Quad express set to be positioned west of the high noon express, to give better access to where the old Jumbo T-Bar used to operate near. The existing Giant fixed grip chairlift is set to be replaced by a new detachable quad express. A gondola is planned to be constructed on Turoa, replacing both the Parklane and Movenpick chairs, starting at the base area and terminating at the location of the top station of the Movenpick chair with a mid station allowing for access to the Wintergarden beginners area.

Lift Name	Type	Ride Time	Capacity and Speed	Starting Elevation	Vertical Rise
High Noon Express	Six seater detachable chairlift	6 min	3200 people per hour, 5 m/s	1924m	398m
Movenpick Chair	Quad chairlift	15 min	2000 people per hour, 2 m/s	1620m	307m
Giant Chair	Triple chairlift	12 min	1200 people per hour, 2.5 m/s	1747m	310m
Parklane Chair	Triple chairlift	7 min	1200 people per hour, 2 m/s	1620m	136m
Alpine Meadow Platter	Platter lift	2 min	720 people per hour	1600m	12m
Wintergarden Platter	Platter lift	2 min	720 people per hour	1760m	20m
Alpine Meadow Carpet Lift	Magic Carpet	2 min	360 people per hour	1605m	10m

The comfortable capacity of the skifield as of 2023 was 4,800 skiers per day, having been higher in the past and after proposed upgrades will reduce to 4,500 skiers per day.
