= Jeff Bollow =

American actor

- Born: September 25, 1971 (age 54); Santa Monica, California
- Occupations: Director, writer, producer, author, public speaker
- Years active: 1986–present
- Awards: ATOM Award; 2007
- Website: http://www.jeffbollow.com

Jeff Bollow (born September 25, 1971 in Santa Monica, California) is an actor, writer, director, producer, author, public speaker, and film festival organizer. He is the author of Writing FAST: How to Write Anything with Lightning Speed, the producer/director of the ATOM Award-winning Making Fantastic Short Films, and the founder of Australia's Screenplay Development Centre. In May 2015, he delivered the TED Talk "Expand Your Imagination Exponentially" at TEDxDocklands in Melbourne, Australia.

== Biography ==
=== Early career ===
Born and raised in Los Angeles, Bollow began acting as a teenager, appearing in dozens of film, television, stage, and commercial productions, including Don't Tell Mom the Babysitter's Dead, Ann Jillian, Columbo, Pink Lightning and Gabriel's Fire, as well as television commercials for Kellogg's Pop-Tarts, Doritos, Visa, and several others.

During this time, he also did a wide assortment of production work, starting with Mary-Kate and Ashley Olsen's first music video "Brother for Sale", before working for companies such as Universal Pictures, Roger Corman's Concorde/New Horizons, and several music video companies. He eventually began making his own short films, including the IFC New Filmmaker Award-winning 1995 short "The Duel".

=== Writer and speaker ===
In 1996, Bollow moved to New Zealand, where he continued acting, with minor appearances in Shortland Street, Lost Valley, Young Hercules (as an ADR actor), and several others. While in New Zealand, he wrote 6,000 Miles from Hollywood, an independent feature film co-produced with Billy Milionis in Sydney, Australia on a shoestring budget, a project which was abandoned in post-production after seven years.

Unable to find commercially viable screenplays in Australia to develop, Bollow launched the Screenplay Development Centre in 2000, which presented screenwriting workshops and seminars throughout Australia, New Zealand and internationally.

In 2004, Bollow designed a systematic approach to the writing process he dubbed "the FAST System", an acronym for Focus, Apply, Strengthen, Tweak. He authored a book called Writing FAST: How to Write Anything with Lightning Speed, which was briefly an Amazon.com bestseller in May 2005.

In 2009, Bollow launched a comprehensive, 10-month online screenplay development system called FAST Screenplay, an expansion of his earlier FAST System.

On May 3, 2015, he delivered the TED Talk "Expand Your Imagination Exponentially" at TEDxDocklands in Melbourne, Australia.

=== Director ===
Eager to reignite his directing career, Bollow produced and directed Making Fantastic Short Films, a widely praised educational DVD for primary and secondary schools, and winner of the prestigious 2007 ATOM Award for Best Instructional/Training Resource. MFSF was also nominated for Best Primary Education Resource and Best Secondary Education Resource.

Bollow went on to direct several episodes of Pacific Beat St, a television series for TV3 in New Zealand, and the full-length play Five Women Wearing the Same Dress, the inaugural production of the PGT Theatre in Sydney.

=== Film festival organizer ===
With business partner Bret Gibson, Bollow was co-founder of the Big Mountain Short Film Festival in Ohakune, New Zealand, and served as festival director and host for its first two years.

=== Other works ===
Bollow was a co-author of Apple Training Series: iLife 08, a book for Apple and Peachpit Press, for which he wrote the chapters on the iMovie 08 consumer video editing software.

He was invited to the jury of the Kuala Lumpur International Film Festival in 2007, and returned to deliver his Making Movies Outside Hollywood seminar in 2008. He appeared onstage to present the award for Best North American Film.

He is currently in Los Angeles writing a new book entitled Phenomenal: The Self-Fulfilling Prophecy and a related website called The Phenomenal Experience.
