= Ohakune volcanic complex =

Volcano in New Zealand

- Ohakune craters, Rochfort Crater
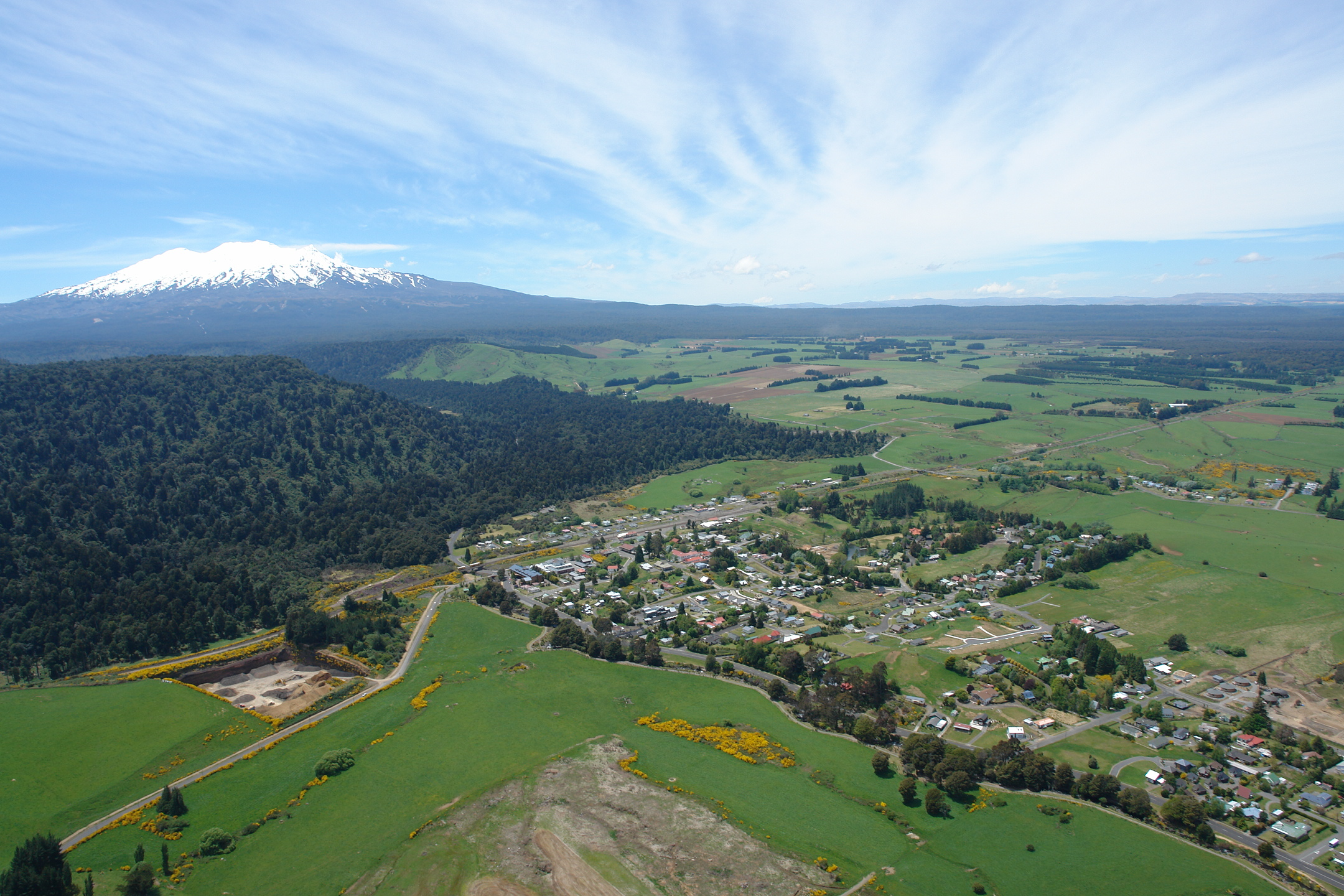
- The Ohakune volcanic complex commences at the small quarry in the left foreground and only involves the near forest margin which rises beyond in uplift associated with the more recently active Ohakune Fault. In the far distance is the snow covered active Mount Ruapehu.

Highest point
- Elevation: 639 m (2,096 ft)
- Coordinates: 39°23′54″S 175°24′43″E

Geography
- Location within New Zealand
- Location: New Zealand

Geology
- Rock age: 31,500 years
- Mountain type: Monogenetic volcano
- Volcanic zone: Just south of Taupō Volcanic Zone

Climbing
- Easiest route: Mangawhero Forest Walk
- The Ohakune volcanic complex is outlined in violet with definite crater vents outlines in yellow. Known active east - west Taupō Rift termination fault surface traces are in red. Click on the map to enable mouse over that can show feature names.

The Ohakune volcanic complex (Ohakune craters, Rochfort Crater) is a small extinct monogenetic volcano south-west of Mount Ruapehu and just north of the town of Ohakune in Manawatū-Whanganui, New Zealand. It is in the area of the southernmost volcanic activity in the Taupō Rift and located adjacent to the potentially active Ohakune Fault.

== Geography ==
The complex is located at the north-western corner of the town of Ohakune at the Tongariro National Park boundary and bisected by the main trunk railway line as it leaves the town to the north-west. Although the Ohakune volcanic complex is also known as the Rochfort Crater, this is the geographical name for the largest of several craters associated with the complex.

South of the main trunk railway line is the main scoria cone that reaches a height of 639 m (2,096 ft) and has been quarried on its south-eastern flank. There are a couple of depressions south of the railway line adjacent to the town. North of the line the volcano is mainly forested and there are three cone and crater structures called the central scoria cone, south scoria cone, and north scoria cone. The geographical Rochfort Crater is the crater of the central scoria cone, which is also associated with west and east ejecta rings.

To the east of the complex is the Mangawhero River and to its north forested land rises rapidly to the plateau like peak of Raetihi on the slopes of Mount Ruapehu whose central edifice is about 20 km (12 mi) away.

== Geology ==
Underlying the Ohakune volcanic complex are Pliocene marine sediments and tephra from various sources and the more recent tephra that overlies the volcanic deposits means all activity must have stopped by 25,400 years ago. At least one eruption has been accurately dated to 31,500 ± 300 years BP.

It is composed of ejecta deposits from multiple phreatomagmatic and Strombolian eruptions from separate vents, and been regarded as a parasitic centre flank eruption from the magma supply of Mount Ruapehu. At least seven vents have been identified. The total DRE volume is 12.36×10^{6} m^{3} (4.36×10^{8} cu ft). Within 5 km (3.1 mi) to the south is the maar lake of Rangatauanui, previously known as Rangataua Crater, or Rangataua Crater Lake, Rangatauanui Hill, and the maar lake of Rangatauaiti all of which are in the Ngā Roto-o-Rangataua Scenic Reserve. These may be a similar potential Ruapehu parasite, representing part of the southernmost vents complex of the Taupō Volcanic Zone which is defined as terminating at Mount Ruapehu. The structure of the southern Ruapehu magma system is however unknown and evidence exists for at least in the case of the northern Ohakune volcanic complex an approximately 16–18 km (9.9–11.2 mi) depth for the originating magma reservoir, fair magma ascent rates and that the magma conduit may be independent of the main feeder system of Mount Ruapehu. (Note: The volcanoes are technically either one of the most southern in the Taupō Rift or the Taupō Volcanic Zone depending upon which definition is used of the later. Unresolved are the issues of whether they are parasitic volcanoes to Mount Ruapehu, volcanoes with separate magma sources or a single volcano with a single magma source.) Either way these volcanoes may be the present propagating tip of the arc system that extends from the Taupō Rift through the South Kermadec Ridge Seamounts and Kermadec Islands to beyond Tonga.

The scoria cone contains magnesian andesites whose composition suggest an origin from deeper and less mature parts of the Ruapehu magmatic system than typical of the stratovolcano itself. The magma composition has been related to the Wadati–Benioff zone depth of 120 km (75 mi) under the volcano.

The Taupō Rift termination faults include a number of cross faults of which one is the Ohakune Fault that is adjacent. This fault has over the last 18,000 years displaced at a rate of 3.5 ± 1.2 mm (0.138 ± 0.047 in)/year The eruption site is likely related to the faults presence, though termination of a propagating dyke in a fissure vent zone that is parallel to the fault for about 600 m (2,000 ft).
