= Ohakune =

Town in Manawatū-Whanganui, New Zealand

- Minor urban area
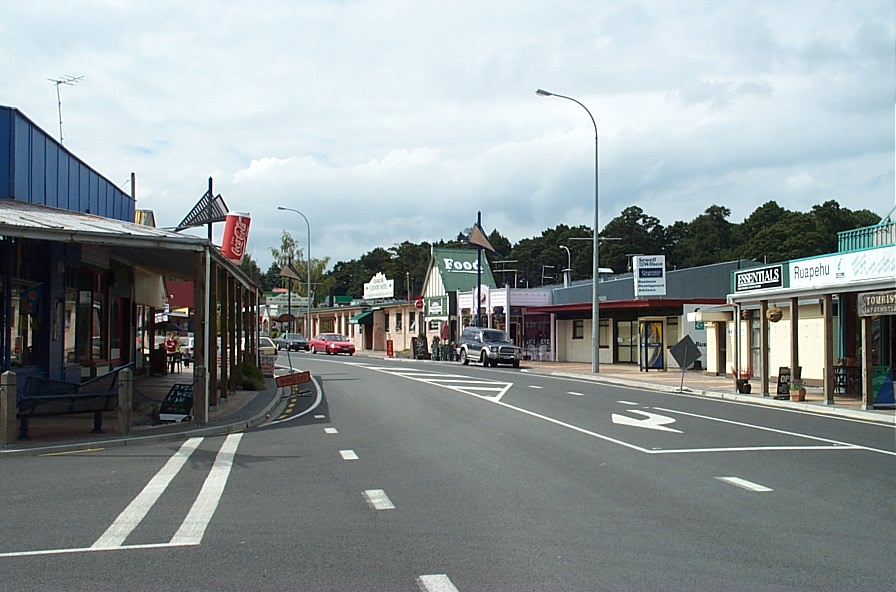
- Main street of Ohakune
- Interactive map of Ohakune
- Coordinates: 39°25′07″S 175°23′58″E
- Country: New Zealand
- Region: Manawatū-Whanganui
- District: Ruapehu District
- Ward: Ruapehu General Ward; Ruapehu Māori Ward
- Community: Waimarino-Waiouru Community
- Electorates: Whanganui; Te Tai Hauāuru (Māori)

Government
  - Territorial Authority: Ruapehu District Council
  - Regional council: Horizons Regional Council
  - Mayor of Ruapehu: Weston Kirton
  - Whanganui MP: Carl Bates
  - Te Tai Hauāuru MP: Debbie Ngarewa-Packer

Area
  - Total: 6.44 km^{2} (2.49 sq mi)
- Elevation: 582 m (1,909 ft)

Population (June 2025)
  - Total: 1,360
  - Density: 211/km^{2} (547/sq mi)
- Time zone: UTC+12 (NZST)
  - Summer (DST): UTC+13 (NZDT)
- Postcode: 4625
- Telephone: 06

Ohakune is a small town at the southern end of Tongariro National Park, close to the southwestern slopes of the active volcano Mount Ruapehu, in the North Island of New Zealand.

A rural service town known as New Zealand's Carrot Capital, Ohakune is a popular base in winter for skiers using the ski fields (particularly Turoa) of Mount Ruapehu and in summer for trampers hiking the Tongariro Alpine Crossing. Ohakune is also famous for its giant carrot sculpture on the main road into the town.

== Toponymy ==
The Ngāti Rangi iwi say the Māori language name Ohakune comes from the phrase "he Ohakune ki te ao", which broadly means "an opening to a new world" and refers to the descent from Mount Ruapehu into the valley and swamps of the area. In 2019 the New Zealand Geographic Board changed the official name to Ōhakune, indicating that the first letter was a long vowel, but swiftly reverted to Ohakune without a macron when Ngāti Rangi objected.

== History ==
=== Pre-European history ===
The lands to the south and west of Mount Ruapehu were historically inhabited by the Māori of the Ngāti Rangi iwi.

Around the middle of the seventeenth century a marae at Rangataua, a small town about five kilometres south-east of Ohakune, was attacked and the inhabitants were driven from their homes by raiders from the Ngāti Raukawa, an iwi from farther east in Manawatū. Around 75 of the village's population were slain and the dozen or so survivors fled to Maungarongo and established a pā on the present site of the town of Ohakune.

=== Establishment ===
The Crown purchased 10,000 acres of Native land at Ohakune in 1879.

In 1883, the first engineering reconnaissance commenced for the Marton—Te Awamutu section of the North Island Main Trunk Railway and a base was established upon the present site of Ohakune, soon becoming a permanent camp for railway and road construction workers. Settlement of the town commenced in the early 1890s around the confluence of the Mangawhero and Mangateitei rivers, along the road from Raetihi to Taumarunui. Forty quarter-acre sections in the township were sold at auction in February 1893. Prior to the completion of the railway to the town, all supplies had to be transported via cart from Hunterville, or from Whanganui via the Whanganui River steamer to Pipiriki and then by cart for the remaining distance. By March 1908 the railway line had reached Ohakune, with new development around the railway station to the northeast of the early settlement becoming known as Ohakune East and then Ohakune Junction. The period of railway construction activities was followed quickly by intensive timber milling; as the forest was cleared, cattle and sheep were introduced and farming progressed. Ohakune was constituted a town district in August 1908 and in November 1911 attained borough status.

=== Railway ===
The central North Island section of the North Island Main Trunk was the last part to be constructed. Prime Minister Sir Joseph Ward drove the last spike on 6 November 1908, and the 'Last Spike' monument is at Manganui-o-te-Ao, near Pokaka to the north of Ohakune. A two-day NIMT service started on 9 November 1908, with an overnight stop at Ohakune (for northbound passengers) or Taumarunui (for southbound passengers). On 14 February 1909, the first NIMT express left Auckland for Wellington, an overnight trip scheduled to take 19 hours 15 minutes, with a sleeping car, day cars with reclining seats, and postal/parcels vans. The dining car went on the north express from Wellington to Ohakune, then transferred to the southbound express, so avoiding the heavy gradients of the central section.

A railway branch line from Ohakune to Raetihi was opened on 18 December 1917 and closed on 1 January 1968. A truss bridge formerly used by this branch still stands near the Big Carrot. In March 1918 there was a major fire at Raetihi. A relief train was sent along the branch line from Ohakune to rescue hundreds of people, many of whom were temporarily blinded by smoke and had sought shelter in waterways.

In the 1980s a section of the trunk line between Ohakune and Horopito was realigned, with three viaducts replaced to handle higher loads and speeds.

Although the railway was important for many years for moving passengers and freight including timber and produce, by the mid-1980s Ohakune was no longer a major stop for passenger or goods trains.

=== Timber milling ===
Alec Bennett and John Punch opened a sawmill at Raetihi in 1893. The tramway they built to remove logs from the bush now forms part of Te Ara Mangawhero, a new cycling and walking track between Ohakune and Mount Ruapehu. The earliest sawmill in Ohakune may have been J F Bell's mill, in operation there in 1904. Another of the early mills in Ohakune was established in 1909 by Frank Carter, whose business later developed into the firm Carter Holt Harvey. Carter's mill operated on the south side of the Mangateitei Stream until the bush around it was cleared in 1915. Sawmilling was the main industry in Ohakune between 1909, after the railway reached Ohakune, and the late 1920s. After this, sawmilling declined in importance as most of the bush around Ohakune had been felled by then, and in 1929 the Great Depression began.

Milling picked up again in the 1960s when the Karioi Forest (15 km east of Ohakune) was replanted, and in the 1970s a pulp mill opened at Karioi.

=== Market gardens ===
From the early 1900s, Chinese began to settle in Ohakune, which had fertile, loamy volcanic soil good for growing crops. They worked as gardeners and shopkeepers, selling produce to bushmen and sawmillers in the area. Market gardening expanded after the arrival of the railway, as access to markets in Auckland and Wellington became easier. Chinese market gardeners began to lease recently deforested land, removing stumps, improving the soil and then growing oats, root vegetables and cabbages. After several years grass would be sown on the improved land and the lease would return to the land owners, while the Chinese would move to another site to garden. By 1939 there were about 20 Chinese market gardeners operating from Ohakune with about 1500 acres under cultivation in the greater Ohakune/Raetihi area, and in 1941 a report stated that Ohakune and the surrounding district produced almost half of the North Island's vegetables. During World War 2, Ohakune became a base for the government's Services Vegetable Production scheme. Growers were contracted to supply vegetables to New Zealand and Allied Forces in the Pacific, and to the army base at Waiouru. Labour was scarce, so prisoners from the nearby Waikune Prison Camp were brought in to help tend the crops.

After World War 2, some market gardens were converted to farms for returned soldiers, so there was less land available for the Chinese gardeners to lease. Consolidation of gardens into bigger operations, specialisation and mechanisation reduced the number of market gardens. Produce began to be transported by road rather than rail. Many Chinese growers left the area, often moving to Pukekohe, and the percentage of gardens in Ohakune run by Europeans increased. A big decrease in the number of market gardens occurred in the 1980s as the original farmers died.

=== 1942 flood ===
A serious flood occurred in Ohakune on 6 January 1942, killing one resident. Both rivers in the town burst their banks, topsoil on market gardens was washed away, and huge quantities of silt and "driftwood" (probably 'slash', waste wood from forestry) were deposited on the streets. The Waimarino Acclimatisation Society blamed the floods on removal of native bush on Mount Ruapehu, leading to erosion.

=== Ohakune Mountain Road, Turoa ski field and Turoa Alpine Village ===
For many years skiers, trampers and residents of Ohakune promoted the idea of a road from Ohakune up Mount Ruapehu to provide access to a new ski area. In 1910 the Ohakune Ruapehu Alpine Club created a track, and for years there were funding requests, engineering reports and discussions with the Tongariro National Park Board and the government. In November 1952, the Ohakune Chamber of Commerce and Ohakune Borough Council asked the Tongariro National Park Board for permission to build a nine-mile (14.5 km) road to Blyth Hut. Residents donated money and volunteers worked on the road, aiming to build a mile of road each year. It took 10 years of mainly volunteer labour to construct the road, which was officially opened on 4 March 1963. The road was extended higher up the mountain in 1966–1967. Over its short length the road rises 3,000 ft (910 m) through rimu forest, beech forest and tussock.

A ski tow operated by an Ohakune company was installed on the mountain in May 1962, and with construction of the access road completed, development of the Turoa ski field became viable. Turoa ski field opened for skiing in 1978, with its official opening in 1979.

Initially, accommodation for skiers visiting the newly opened ski field was provided at a large caravan park at Rochfort Park, which had formerly been Rochfort Station on the closed Raetihi railway branch line. This land later became the site of the Big Carrot and Carrotland. The ski field company then bought 50 acres (20ha) of land nearby on the southern outskirts of Ohakune and built Turoa Alpine Village, consisting of chalet and A-frame style lodges, to provide accommodation for the 1980 ski season and beyond.

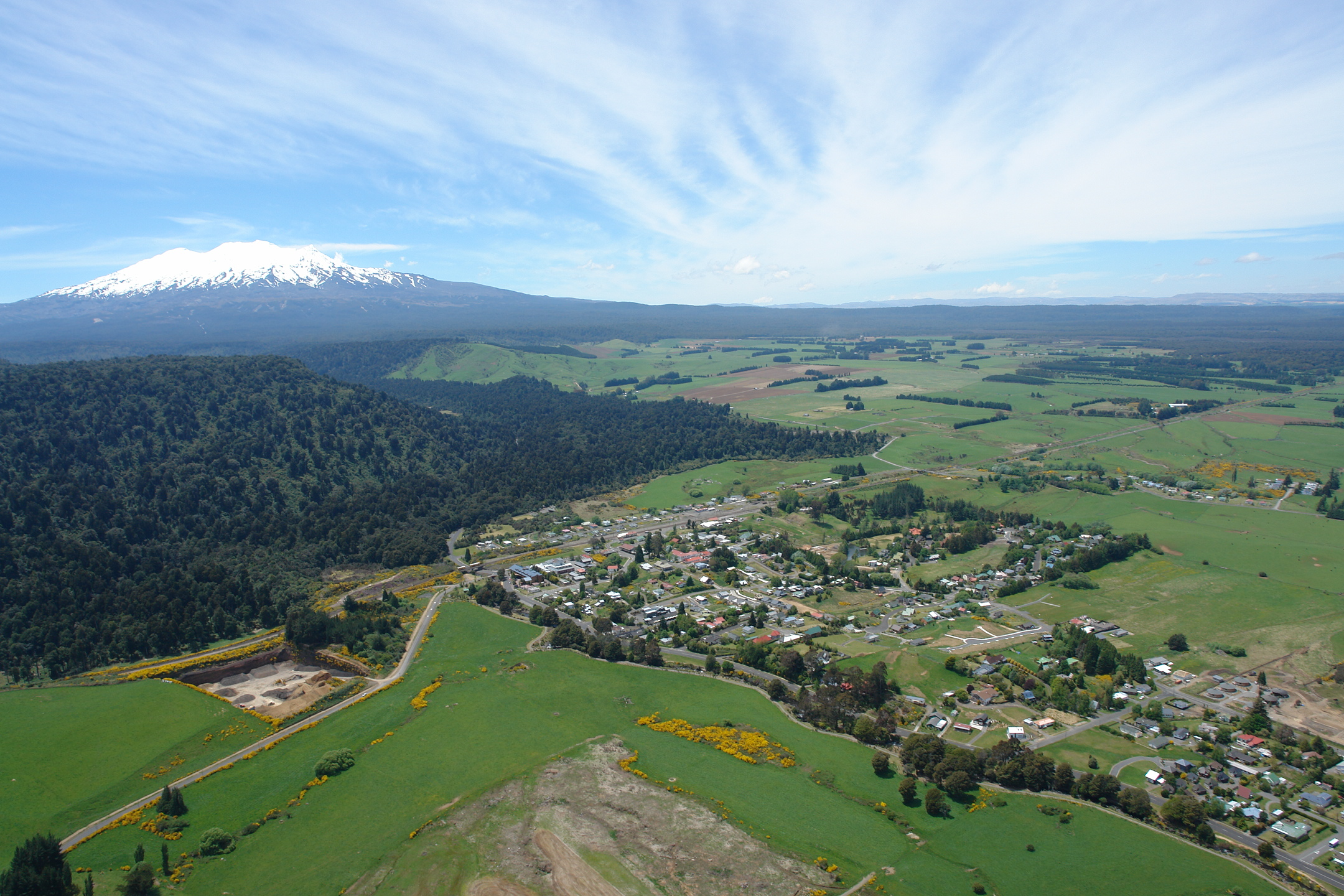
Ohakune from the air, looking north towards Mount Ruapehu. The railway runs from centre left to top right, and the Mangawhero River borders the town, running from centre to bottom right.

== Geography ==
Ohakune is located in the Ruapehu District and the Manawatū-Whanganui region, to the immediate south-west of the slopes of the Mount Ruapehu stratovolcano. The associated Ohakune volcanic complex is just to the north of the town and the small maar lakes Rangatauanui and Rangatauaiti are to the south of the town. The town is 25 kilometres (16 miles) west of Waiouru, 70 kilometres (43 miles) northeast of Whanganui, 287 kilometres (178 miles) north of Wellington and 292 kilometres (181 miles) south of Auckland, and is at an elevation of 582 metres (1,909 ft).

The Mangateitei Stream flows roughly east to west through the town, joining the Mangawhero River which flows southward from near the railway station and then turns west.

== Climate ==
Climate data for Ohakune, elevation 607 m (1,991 ft), (1991–2020)
Month	Jan	Feb	Mar	Apr	May	Jun	Jul	Aug	Sep	Oct	Nov	Dec	Year
Record high °C (°F)	31.1 (88.0)	30.7 (87.3)	28.0 (82.4)	26.0 (78.8)	22.0 (71.6)	19.1 (66.4)	17.4 (63.3)	18.8 (65.8)	21.3 (70.3)	25.0 (77.0)	27.8 (82.0)	29.0 (84.2)	31.1 (88.0)
Mean daily maximum °C (°F)	21.8 (71.2)	22.0 (71.6)	19.7 (67.5)	16.2 (61.2)	13.2 (55.8)	10.6 (51.1)	9.7 (49.5)	10.8 (51.4)	12.6 (54.7)	14.8 (58.6)	17.2 (63.0)	19.9 (67.8)	15.7 (60.3)
Daily mean °C (°F)	15.7 (60.3)	16.0 (60.8)	13.8 (56.8)	11.1 (52.0)	8.6 (47.5)	6.5 (43.7)	5.6 (42.1)	6.5 (43.7)	8.1 (46.6)	10.1 (50.2)	11.7 (53.1)	14.4 (57.9)	10.7 (51.2)
Mean daily minimum °C (°F)	9.6 (49.3)	10.0 (50.0)	7.9 (46.2)	6.0 (42.8)	4.1 (39.4)	2.4 (36.3)	1.6 (34.9)	2.1 (35.8)	3.7 (38.7)	5.3 (41.5)	6.1 (43.0)	8.8 (47.8)	5.6 (42.1)
Record low °C (°F)	−1.0 (30.2)	−0.6 (30.9)	−3.3 (26.1)	−3.5 (25.7)	−6.7 (19.9)	−10.0 (14.0)	−7.8 (18.0)	−6.4 (20.5)	−6.7 (19.9)	−5.8 (21.6)	−4.0 (24.8)	−1.4 (29.5)	−10.0 (14.0)
Average rainfall mm (inches)	97.5 (3.84)	72.7 (2.86)	74.9 (2.95)	111.2 (4.38)	113.6 (4.47)	128.7 (5.07)	148.6 (5.85)	121.5 (4.78)	137.8 (5.43)	128.4 (5.06)	117.6 (4.63)	104.3 (4.11)	1,356.8 (53.43)
Mean monthly sunshine hours	267.6	198.6	195.3	156.3	126.4	101.0	111.6	125.5	142.1	167.6	227.8	236.6	2,056.4
Source 1: NIWA
Source 2: weatherbase

== Demographics ==
Stats NZ describes Ohakune as a small urban area, which covers 6.44 km^{2} (2.49 sq mi). It had an estimated population of 1,360 as of June 2025, with a population density of 211 people per km^{2}.

Historical population
Year	Pop.	±% p.a.
2006	1,095	—
2013	984	−1.52%
2018	1,182	+3.73%
2023	1,284	+1.67%

Ōhakune had a population of 1,284 in the 2023 New Zealand census, an increase of 102 people (8.6%) since the 2018 census, and an increase of 300 people (30.5%) since the 2013 census. There were 657 males, 621 females, and 9 people of other genders in 576 dwellings. 2.8% of people identified as LGBTIQ+. The median age was 35.7 years (compared with 38.1 years nationally). There were 297 people (23.1%) aged under 15 years, 195 (15.2%) aged 15 to 29, 624 (48.6%) aged 30 to 64, and 171 (13.3%) aged 65 or older.

People could identify as more than one ethnicity. The results were 70.8% European (Pākehā); 40.0% Māori; 2.6% Pasifika; 6.3% Asian; 1.4% Middle Eastern, Latin American and African New Zealanders (MELAA); and 2.1% other, which includes people giving their ethnicity as "New Zealander". English was spoken by 96.0%, Māori by 11.0%, Samoan by 0.2%, and other languages by 7.0%. No language could be spoken by 2.3% (e.g. too young to talk). New Zealand Sign Language was known by 0.7%. The percentage of people born overseas was 15.9, compared with 28.8% nationally.

Religious affiliations were 25.0% Christian, 0.7% Hindu, 0.7% Islam, 5.6% Māori religious beliefs, 0.5% Buddhist, 0.9% New Age, and 1.6% other religions. People who answered that they had no religion were 58.9%, and 6.1% of people did not answer the census question.

Of those at least 15 years old, 192 (19.5%) people had a bachelor's or higher degree, 558 (56.5%) had a post-high school certificate or diploma, and 234 (23.7%) people exclusively held high school qualifications. The median income was $40,100, compared with $41,500 nationally. 114 people (11.6%) earned over $100,000 compared to 12.1% nationally. The employment status of those at least 15 was 549 (55.6%) full-time, 144 (14.6%) part-time, and 30 (3.0%) unemployed.

== Economy ==
In the year to March 2021, the GDP of Ohakune was $74m, representing approximately 10% of the GDP for the Ruapehu District as a whole. The economy of the town is largely based on services, particularly for skiers and other visitors to Tongariro National Park. The largest categories of GDP were retail trade (15.8%), arts and recreation services (14%), accommodation and food services (10.9%) and owner-occupied property operation (9.1%). In the same period there were 781 filled jobs, with 22.5% of these in retail trade, 19.9% in accommodation and food services, and 14.3% in arts and recreation services.

In 2017, Canterbury produced almost half of New Zealand's carrots and parsnips and the Manawatu-Whanganui region was the next largest production area, with two-thirds of carrots produced in the North Island coming from Ohakune. However, by 2023, vegetable growers in Ohakune said they were wondering if their businesses were still viable, citing increases in the price of fuel, fertiliser, sprays, power and other things needed to produce the crops, increasing compliance costs, as well as the difficulty of finding staff and rising costs of wages.

== Facilities ==
Ohakune has the usual range of shops and services found within a typical small New Zealand town. In 2015 Ohakune had a dental clinic, pharmacy, fire station, police station, ambulance station, social welfare branch, churches, a gymnasium, and a health shuttle for outpatient care at Whanganui Hospital 110 km (68 mi) away. The nearest medical centre with GP, nurses and physiotherapist is 11 km (6.8 mi) to the west, at Raetihi.

=== Marae ===
Ohakune has two marae. Maungārongo Marae and Tikaraina Ringapoto or Ko Te Kingi o Te Maungārongo meeting house are meeting places of the Ngāti Rangi hapū of Ngāti Tui-o-Nuku. Ngā Mōkai Marae and Whakarongo meeting house are meeting places of the Ngāti Rangi hapū of Ngāti Tongaiti.

In October 2020, the Government committed $836,930 from the Provincial Growth Fund to upgrade a cluster of seven marae, including Maungārongo Marae, creating 95 jobs.

=== Media ===
Ohakune is covered by the Whanganui Chronicle, a daily paper part of the NZ Herald network. A local weekly community newspaper, the Waimarino Bulletin was published between 31 May 1983 and 14 February 1989 when it was renamed as the Ruapehu Bulletin, with the first issue under that name published on 21 February 1989. The Ruapehu Bulletin covers Waiouru, Ohakune, Raetihi, National Park, and the surrounding rural areas. Ski FM Network radio covers Ohakune on 91.8 FM. During the winter it operates as an "information desk" for information about the snow levels for the region.

== Recreation ==
Ohakune has facilities for snow sports, trout fishing, mountain biking, tramping and bushwalking. Ohakune provides easy access to the nearby ski fields of Mount Ruapehu; the large commercial ski resorts of Turoa (the closest resort to Ohakune) and Whakapapa, as well as the small club field Tukino. Various outlets for clothing and ski hire, as well as purchasing lift tickets, are available in the town.

Ohakune has a number of clubs and is home to the Ruapehu Rugby & Sports Club.

Ohakune caters for various summer activities, and provides access for trampers hiking the Tongariro Alpine Crossing. Mountain bikes are available for hire at various outlets in town.

Various water activities are available on the nearby rivers, with jet boating on the Whanganui River and rafting available along the Whanganui, Rangitikei and Tongariro rivers. Trout fishing is available in nearby lakes and rivers, including the world-famous Tongariro River.

The Bridge to Nowhere in the Whanganui National Park located between Ohakune and Whanganui is a popular destination for trampers and mountain bikers.

== Events ==
=== Carrot Carnival ===
The Carrot Carnival has been held in Ohakune since 1996. It was created as a way to boost the town after eruptions of Mount Ruapehu in 1995 and 1996, plus several years of poor snowfall, caused the local economy to shrink by 20%. Tourists and skiers stayed away, causing a $10 million drop in business. The Carrot Carnival features games and competitions between growers, foods made with carrots, and family-friendly attractions.

=== Ohakune Mardi Gras ===
Ohakune Mardi Gras has been held since 1996, when it was organised as a way to bring visitors in after the Ruapehu eruptions damaged tourism. It is both a ski party and celebration of winter, and includes musicians, stalls and rides. Since 2005, the Mardi Gras has been managed by the Ohakune Events Charitable Trust. The event was cancelled in 2017 after the previous year's event suffered a large loss, but it was revived as an R18 event from 2018. In 2024, about 8000 people attended Mardi Gras, bringing in over $1 million in tourism expenditure to the town.

=== Big Mountain Short Film Festival ===
The Big Mountain Short Film Festival has been held since 2006. It is a free festival screening short films and featuring speakers on topics relating to low-budget film-making and story telling.

== Landmarks ==
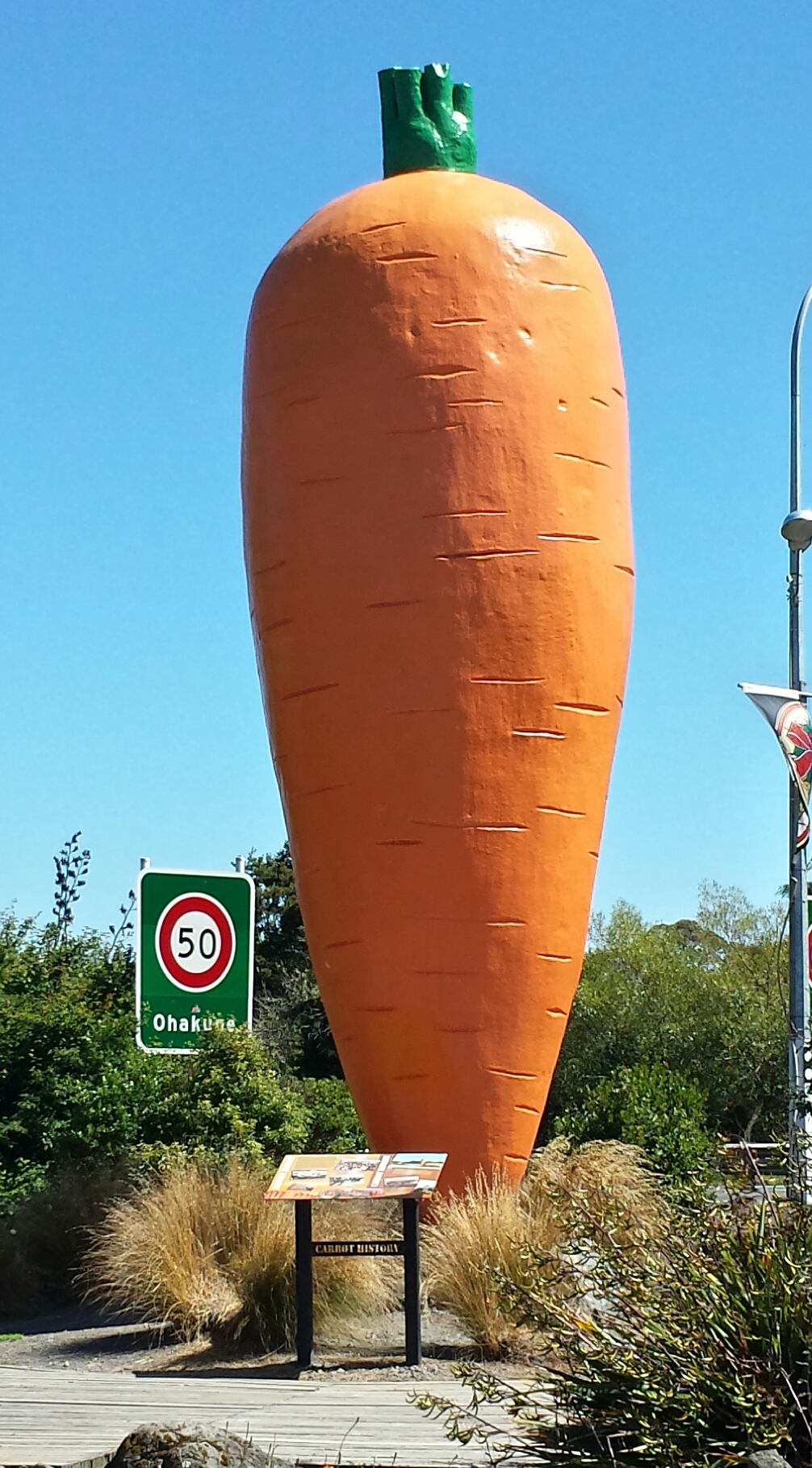
Ohakune's 'Big Carrot'

=== Big Carrot and Carrotland ===
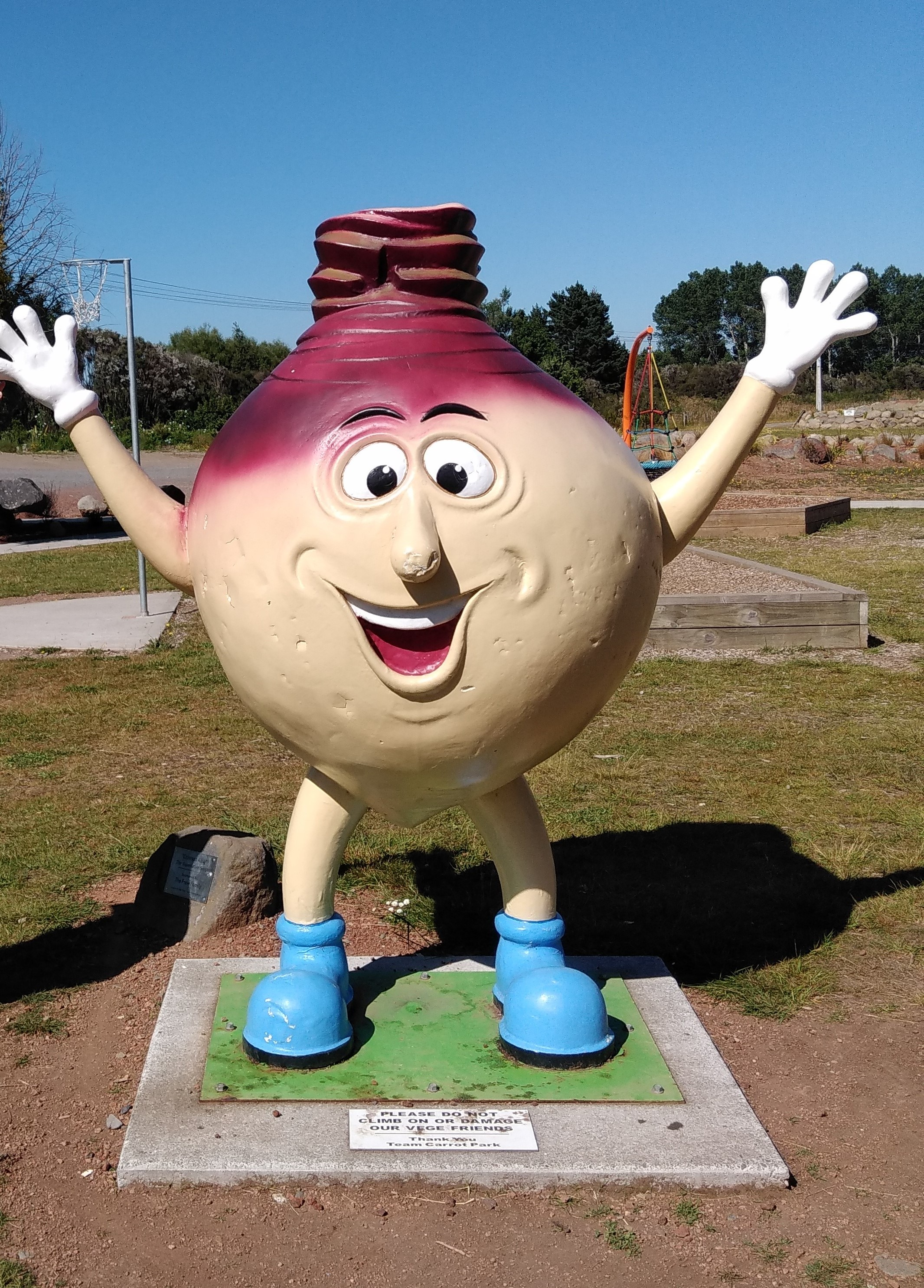
Giant swede at Carrot Park.

On the eastern edge of the town there is a 7.5 metre-high replica of a carrot, known as 'The Big Carrot'. This is reputedly the world's largest model carrot: it was originally constructed as a prop for a television advertisement for the ANZ Bank in the early 1980s. After filming was complete, the carrot was donated to the town in recognition of the area's reputation as the source of a high proportion of New Zealand's carrots, and installed in its current position in 1984. In 2011, the carrot was painted black for the Rugby World Cup hosted that year in New Zealand.

Carrot Adventure Park (or Carrotland) opened on 1 October 2016 next to the Big Carrot. The park features a playground with a carrot-shaped car and fibreglass vegetable people: a swede, a potato, a Brussels sprout and a parsnip, representing crops grown in Ohakune. There are information boards illustrating the district's history of market gardens and forestry, and the park also has picnic spots, a confidence course and a BMX track. In 2023 a carrot-shaped space rocket was added to the park. It was largely funded by YouTubers Joshua Carrott and Oliver Kendal. After visiting the Big Carrot, Carrott declared that it was his spiritual home and wanted to support the park. The 5.3 m spaceship was built by Max Laver of Piopio.

=== War memorial gate ===
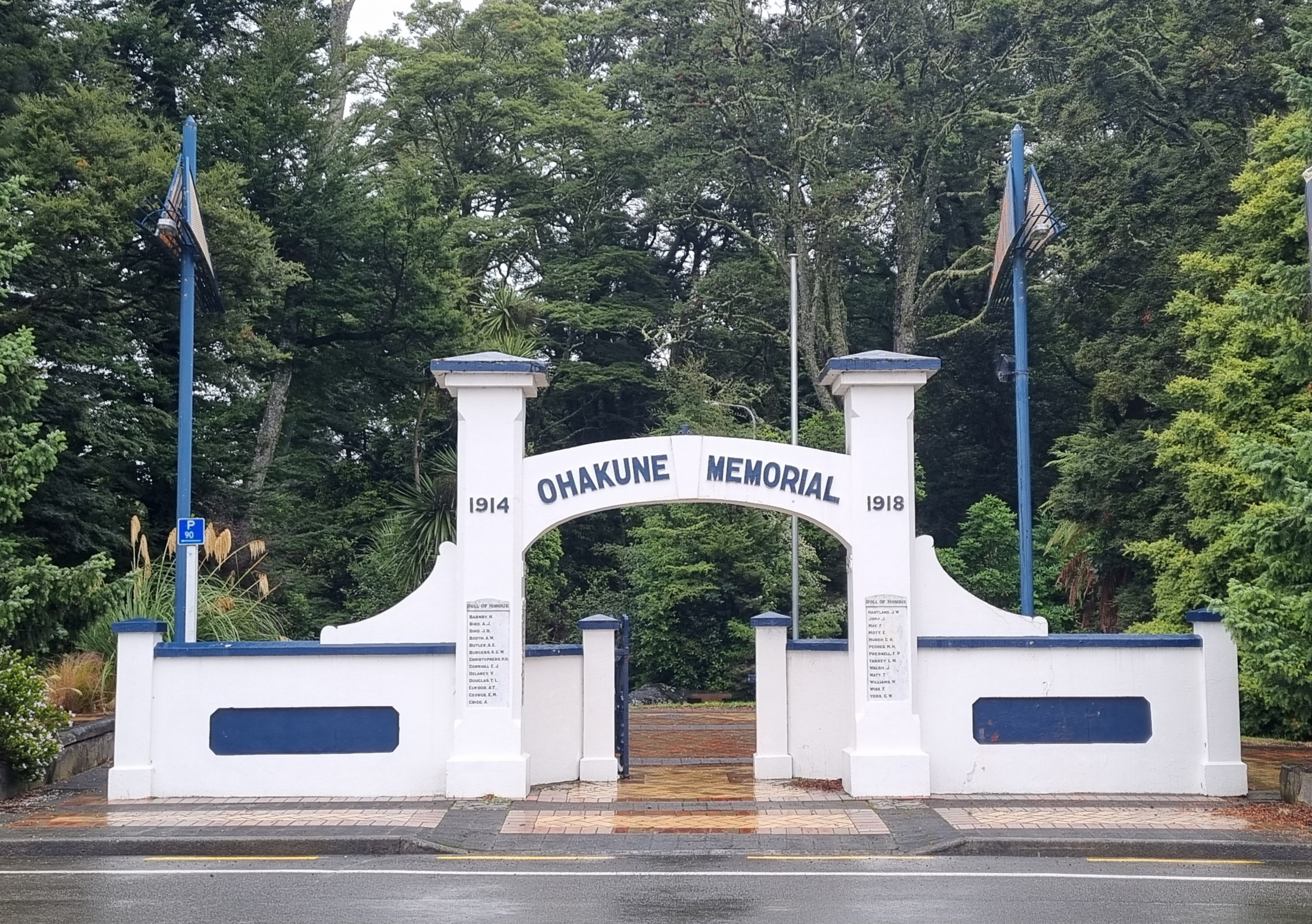
War memorial gate, Clyde Street at Jubilee Park.

There is a war memorial in the form of a large arched gate on Clyde Street at the entrance to Jubilee Park. The memorial was officially opened in October 1932, with marble tablets on it listing the names of 26 men who had enlisted in the district and died during World War 1. Another tablet was added later, listing men who fell in World War 2.

=== Railway station and signal box ===
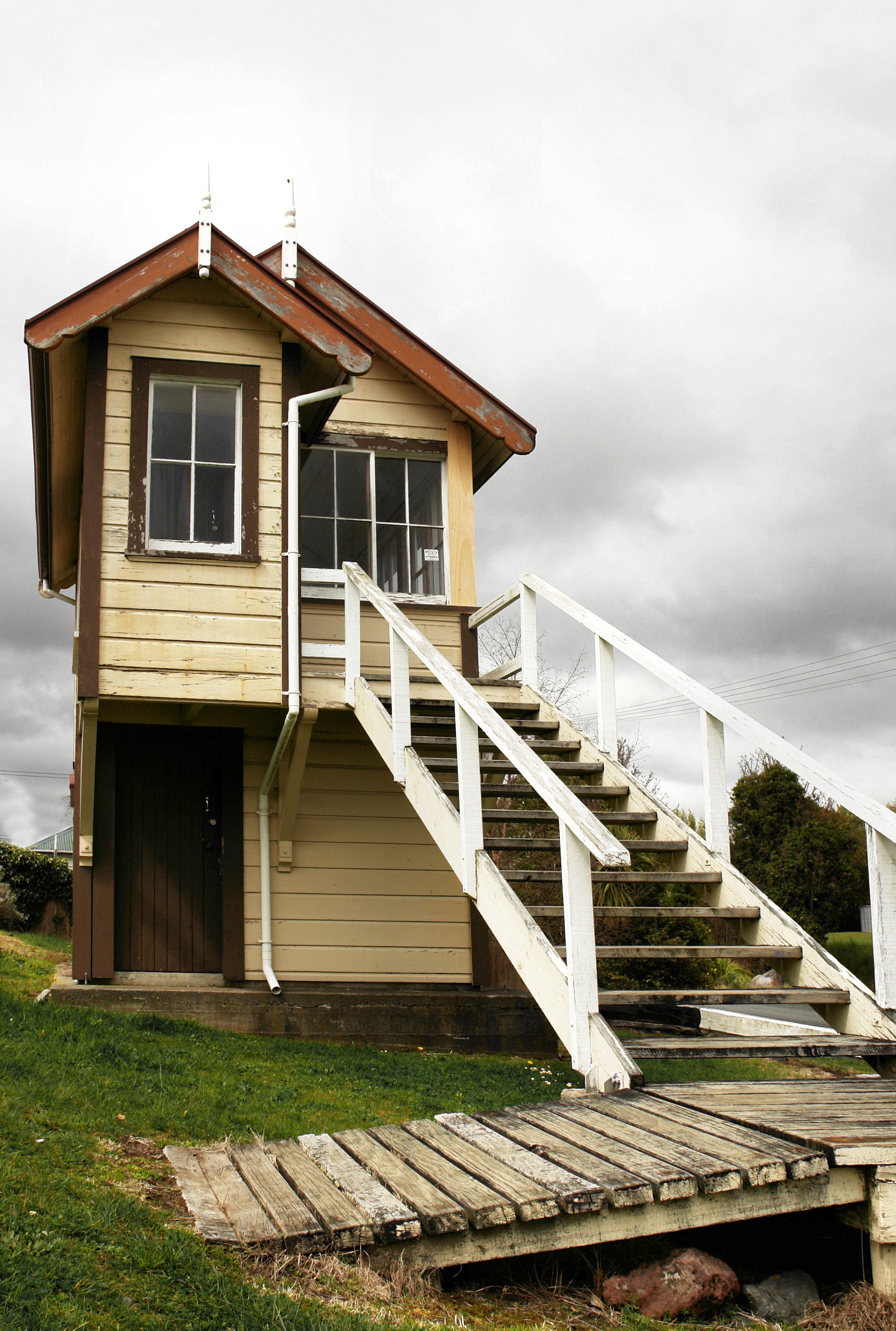
The signal box, Ohakune railway station

Ohakune railway station was built around 1908 as part of the North Island Main Trunk development, and is one of the oldest buildings in Ohakune. Ohakune's original railway signal box was pulled down years ago, but in 1991 one of the signal boxes from Paekākāriki Station was moved to a site on the corner of Thames Street and Ohakune Station Road and restored as part of Ohakune's railway heritage. The station building and signal box were listed by Heritage New Zealand as a Historic Place Category 2 in 2009, and local resident Bob Norling was awarded a Queen's Service Medal in 2020 for "services to railway heritage and community", for his involvement in restoring the station. Near the station is a small railway museum.

=== Weather Rock ===
In the 1980s and '90s Ohakune was home to the Weather Rock, a local landmark in Thames Street popular with tourists for photographs; the rock used to "forecast" current weather conditions with a sign listing sayings such as "If rock is hot – sunny", "If rock is wet – raining", etc., and appropriately for the region, "If rock is bouncing – earthquake".

== Education ==
Ohakune has three schools.

- Ohakune School is a state full primary (Year 1–8) school. It has 262 students. It opened in 1896.
- Ruapehu College is a state secondary (Year 9–13) school. It has 247 students. Ohakune School opened a secondary department in 1921, which became Ohakune District High School in 1928. This moved to the current Ruapehu College site in 1953 and changed to the current name in 1955.
- Te Kura Kaupapa Māori o Ngati Rangi is a state Kura Kaupapa Māori, offering a full primary (Year 1–8) education. It has 51 students. It opened in 1997.

All these schools are co-educational. Rolls are as of July 2026.

== Transportation ==
=== Road ===
State Highway 49 runs through the town, where it is locally named Clyde Street.

Ohakune is on the Intercity coach network, with a non-daily service running north to Auckland via Taumarunui and south to Palmerston North via Whanganui.

=== Rail ===
Ohakune is on the North Island Main Trunk Railway. The railway station is located off Thames Street in the Ohakune Junction area, approximately 2.5 kilometres (1.6 miles) from Clyde Street in the centre of town. Ohakune railway station has the second highest elevation of any operating railway station in New Zealand behind National Park Railway Station: a sign on the platform side of the station building lists its height at 2,029 feet (618.4 metres) above sea level.

Passenger services are provided by the national operator KiwiRail under its Great Journeys New Zealand division. The Northern Explorer is a non-daily service operating between Auckland and Wellington. The journey to/from Auckland crosses the famous Raurimu Spiral.

Seventeen kilometres to the east of the town is the Tangiwai Bridge, site of New Zealand's worst railway accident, the Tangiwai Disaster, on 24 December 1953.

== Popular culture ==
A mock-romantic song from the mid-1960s called September in Ohakune was recorded by Peter Harcourt on an LP called Land of the Long White Shroud.

In 1998, the Big Carrot featured on one of a set of ten postage stamps depicting New Zealand town icons.

== Notable people ==
Notable people from, or significantly connected with, Ohakune include:

- Erwin Leonard Guy Abel – grocer, businessman, athlete and racehorse owner
- Jeff Bollow – co-founder of the Big Mountain Short Film Festival
- Martin Edmond – author and screenplay writer
- Pat Mackie – miner and unionist, born 30 October 1914 as Maurice Patrick Murphy, birth registered in Ohakune
- Mick Moohan – member of the Ohakune Borough Council from 1932 to 1935, also serving as deputy mayor; later Labour Party MP, President, and Minister
- William Taylor – primary school principal, Mayor of Ohakune, and writer
- Peter Williams – barrister, Queen's Counsel and penal reform advocate
