= Hauhungatahi =

Volcano in New Zealand

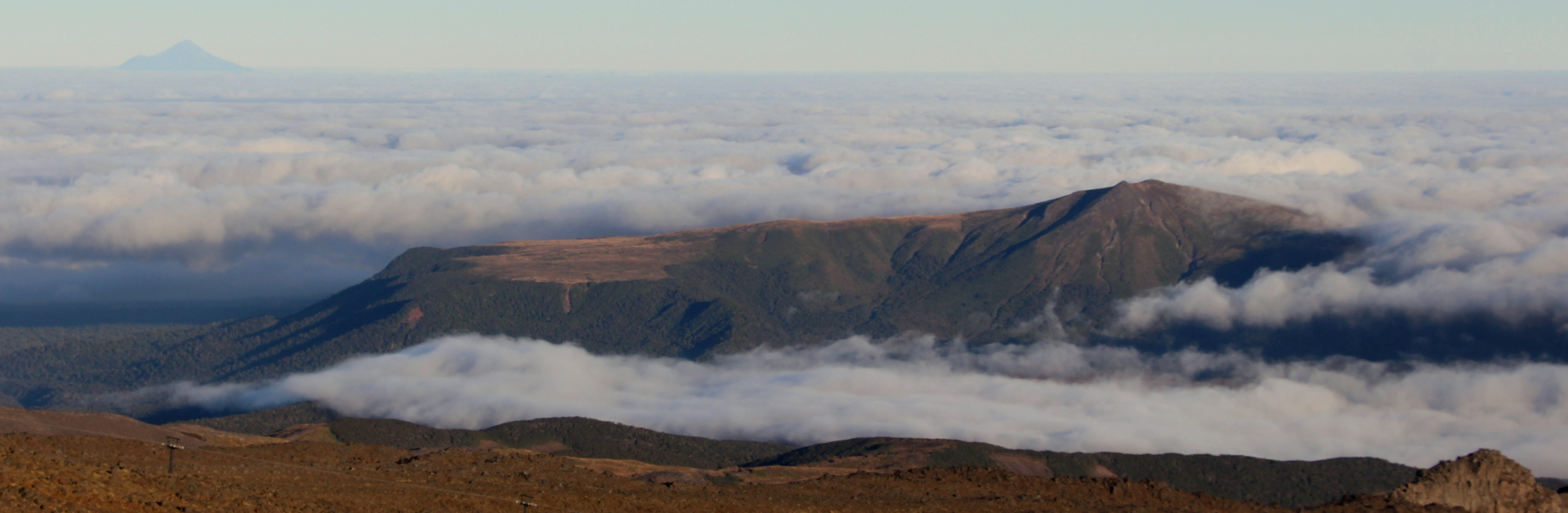
- Hauhungatahi seen from Mount Ruapehu

Highest point
- Elevation: 1,521 m (4,990 ft)
- Prominence: approx 400 m (1,300 ft)
- Coordinates: 39°13′46″S 175°26′39″E

Naming
- Language of name: Māori

Geography
- Location within North Island
- Map of volcanic features near Hauhungatahi (red marker). Surface volcanic deposits are shaded. To its immediate east are Mount Ruapehu and Mount Tongariro with their recent vents active in the last 15,000 years shaded orange-yellow, with craters in yellow outline. Lakes in vents are outlined in blue. To its north east is Lake Rotoaira and beyond that the andesitic deposits of Pihanga. Rhyolitic ignimbrite surface deposits to the north of the map are from eruptions of the Taupō Volcano. Legend: Key for the volcanics that are shown with panning is: basalt (shades of brown/orange); monogenetic basalts; undifferentiated basalts of the Tangihua Complex in Northland Allochthon; arc basalts; arc ring basalts; dacite; andesite (shades of red); basaltic andesite; rhyolite (ignimbrite is lighter shades of violet); plutonic; White shading is selected caldera features.; Clicking on the rectangle icon enables full window and mouse-over with volcano name/wikilink and ages before present.
- Location: North Island, New Zealand
- Topo map: nz49931

Geology
- Rock age: Age Holocene
- Mountain type: stratovolcano
- Volcanic zone: Taupō Volcanic Zone

Climbing
- Easiest route: Tramping from the west, starting near Erua

Hauhungatahi is an eroded andesitic volcano at the southern end of the Taupō Volcanic Zone in New Zealand, located about 12 kilometres (7 mi) north–west of Mount Ruapehu. Although relatively little-known, at 1,521 metres (4,990 ft) Hauhungatahi is one of the highest volcanoes in New Zealand, exceeded in elevation by only Ruapehu, Taranaki/Egmont (including Fanthams Peak), and the Tongariro massif (including Ngauruhoe). It is part of the Tongariro National Park.

== Geology ==
The volcano is constructed atop an upfaulted block of Mesozoic marine sediments. The age of the erupted lava near the youngest cone is about 900,000 years, making Hauhungatahi more than three times as old as the neighbouring Ruapehu. The oldest rocks sampled have not given definite ages but are possibly up to 1.2 million years old. Most samples are basaltic andesite but some of the younger lavas are andesite. The rock composition and age is more similar to Titiraupenga and Pureora in the western region of the Taupō Volcanic Zone than the nearby Ruapehu.

== Ecology ==
The volcano is located in the western part of Tongariro National Park. The terrain surrounding Hauhungatahi and covering an area of 8,498 hectares (33 mi^{2}) has been managed as a Wilderness Area since 1966, one of two such officially designated areas within the park. The local ecosystem was essentially destroyed by the 232 CE Hatepe eruption of the Taupō Volcano. To the west at the base of the mountain is the Erua Swamp which is dominated by swamp umbrella fern and the wire rushEmpodisma robustum with scattered Halocarpus shrubs and New Zealand flax. A number of exotic plants have encroached on the swamp ecosystem from the west since European colonisation including pine from plantations and broom is common around the swamp. Raupō borders parts of the Waimarino Stream which drains both the north–western mountain and the swamp. The freshwater crayfish (koura) is found in the Waimarino Stream right up to the 1,246 m (4,088 ft) alpine plateau, but has not recolonised so high on the nearby active volcanoes such as Mount Ruapehu. The area has allowed the montane forest succession after the Hatepe eruption to be understood, with the initial conifer re-forestation by predominately pāhautea being progressively replaced from about 250 years after the eruption, by the angiosperm kāmahi. The current cover on its slopes has four zones:

1. Montane forest between 850 to 1,000 m (2,790 to 3,280 ft) with canopy dominated by kāmahi and some rimu with tree ferns such as Cyathea smithii in the subcanopy.
2. A short transitional zone between 1,000 to 1,050 m (3,280 to 3,440 ft) with Hall's tōtara and other conifers.
3. A subalpine zone from the transitional zone to the treeline which is between 1,100–1,250 m (3,610–4,100 ft) dominated by the conifers pāhautea and Halocarpus biformis.
4. Alpine tussock lands on the plateau region at the top.

== Access ==
The standard ascent route on Hauhungatahi was a tramp from the west side starting near Erua, following remnants of an old track in places, and bush-bashing through several overgrown and boggy areas to reach the bush line near 1,200 metres (3,900 ft) on the summit plateau; this route is no longer available as it crosses private land. Access is via the Round the Mountain Track or Whakapapaiti Track.

== See also ==
- List of volcanoes in New Zealand
- List of mountains of New Zealand by height
- Volcanism in New Zealand
