= Writing FAST =

2004 non-fiction book by Jeff Bollow

Writing FAST: How to Write Anything with Lightning Speed
- Author: Jeff Bollow
- Language: English
- Publisher: Embryo Films Publishing
- Publication date: 2004
- Publication place: Australia
- Pages: 208
- ISBN: 978-0-9752139-0-2 (first edition)
- OCLC: 70684962

Writing FAST: How to Write Anything with Lightning Speed is a non-fiction book by Jeff Bollow, first published in Australia in 2004, which briefly became a best-seller on the Amazon.com charts in 2005.

The book targets new and intermediate writers, and distills the writing process into four parts - Focus, Apply, Strengthen, Tweak - which form the FAST acronym of the title.

- In the Focus phase, writers grasp and shape their concept.
- In the Apply phase, writers speed write to fill pages as quickly as possible.
- In the Strengthen phase, writers edit and shape the work.
- And in the Tweak phase, writers polish their prose to enhance the read.

The book's tone is conversational and motivational.
