= Mount Ruapehu =

Volcano in New Zealand

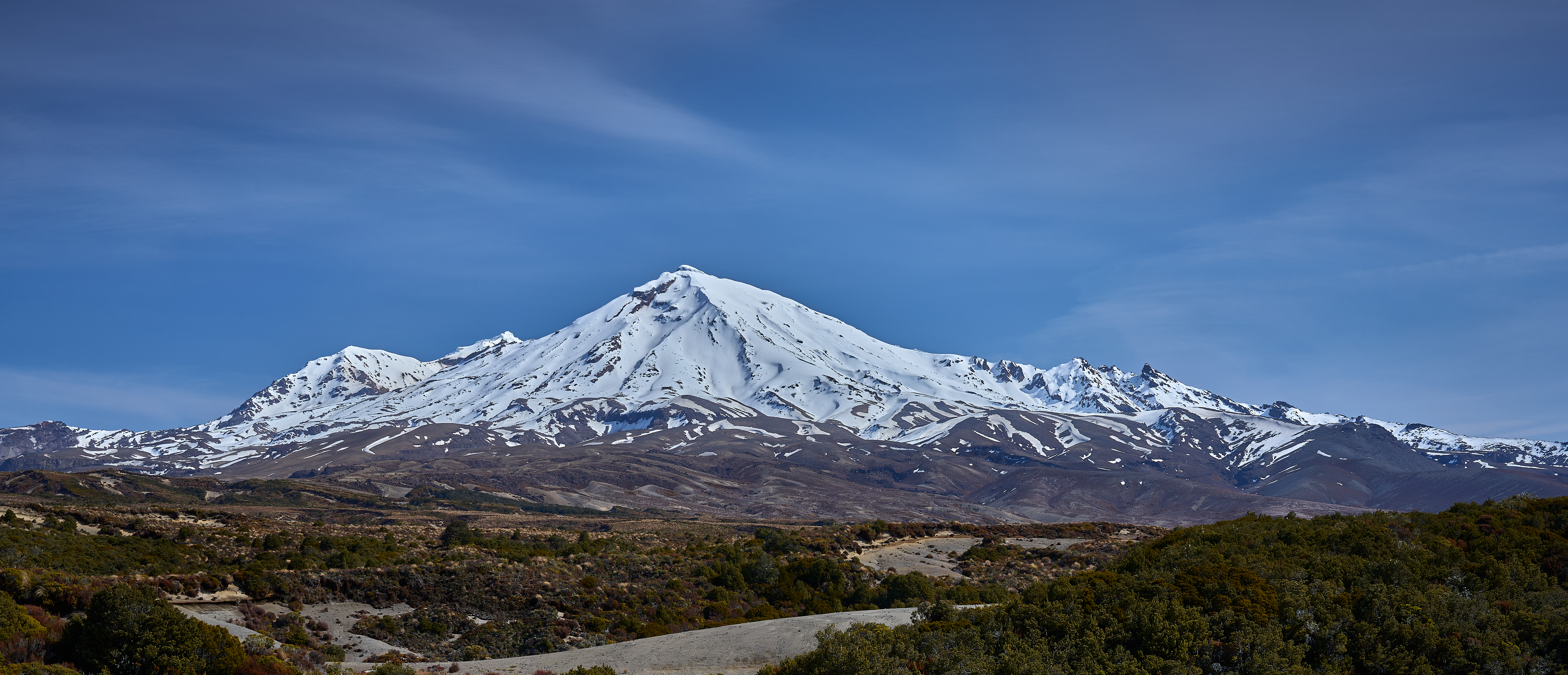
- Mt Ruapehu from Tongariro Northern Circuit, 2023

Highest point
- Elevation: 2,797 m (9,177 ft)
- Prominence: 2,797 m (9,177 ft)
- Listing: Ultra; New Zealand #19
- Coordinates: 39°17′S 175°34′E

Naming
- Native name: Ruapehu (Māori)
- English translation: pit of noise or exploding pit

Geography
- Location within New Zealand
- Location: North Island, New Zealand

Geology
- Rock age: ~200,000 years
- Mountain type: Stratovolcano
- Volcanic zone: Taupō Volcanic Zone
- Last eruption: 25 September 2007

Climbing
- First ascent: 1879 by G. Beetham and J. P. Maxwell (non-indigenous)
- Easiest route: Hike

Mount Ruapehu (Māori: [ˈɾʉaˌpɛhʉ]; English /ˈruːəˌpeɪhuː/) is an active stratovolcano at the southern end of the Taupō Volcanic Zone and North Island volcanic plateau in New Zealand. It is 23 km (14 mi) northeast of Ohakune and 23 km (14 mi) southwest of the southern shore of Lake Taupō, within Tongariro National Park. The North Island's major ski resorts and only glaciers are on its slopes.

Ruapehu, the largest active volcano in New Zealand, has the highest point in the North Island and has three major peaks: Tahurangi (2,797 m; 9,177 ft), Te Heuheu (2,755 m; 9,039 ft) and Paretetaitonga (2,751 m; 9,026 ft). The deep, active crater is between the peaks and fills with water between major eruptions, being known as Crater Lake (Māori: Te Wai ā-moe). The name Ruapehu means "pit of noise" or "exploding pit" in Māori.

== Geography ==
Ruapehu is located in the centre of the North Island of New Zealand, 23 km (14 mi) northeast of Ohakune, New Zealand, and 23 km (14 mi) southwest of the southern shore of Lake Taupō, within Tongariro National Park. Ruapehu is the largest and southernmost volcano in the national park, with an estimated volume of 110 km^{3} (26 cu mi). The volcano is surrounded by a ring plain of volcanic material, made from lahar deposits, ash fall, and landslide debris.

There are three access routes to Ruapehu, and each access route leads to one of the three skifields that are found on its slopes. State Highway 48 leads to Whakapapa Village at the base of the mountain, and from there an access road leads up the mountain to Iwikau Village at the base of the Whakapapa skifield on the northwestern bumpy hilly slopes. An access road from Ohakune leads to Turoa skifield on the southwestern slopes, and a four-wheel drive track leads from the Desert Road (State Highway 1) to the Tukino skifield on the eastern slopes.

Ruapehu's active crater, dubbed Crater Lake (Te Wai ā-moe), is situated at the southern end of the Summit Plateau, and as the name suggests, is filled with a warm, acidic lake. The lake's outlet is at the head of the Whangaehu Valley, where the Whangaehu River arises. The Whangaehu River is notorious for destructive lahars caused by Ruapehu's eruptions. In historic times, eruptions have built tephra dams across the outlet on several occasions, most recently in 1945 and 1996. These dams failed in 1953 and 2007 respectively, causing an outburst of Crater Lake each time, which sent destructive lahars down the river. The 1953 lahar was the cause of the Tangiwai disaster, a railway accident in which 151 people died. Even larger lahars occurred in 1862 and 1895.

=== Glaciers ===
A total of 18 glaciers have been recognised on Ruapehu, of which six are named. Two glaciers are found in the active crater: one on the north side of the crater under Paretetaitonga Peak and another one to the south, and these are New Zealand's only crater glaciers. Most of the ice on Ruapehu is contained in only three of its glaciers: the Whangaehu, Summit Plateau, and Mangatoetoenui glaciers. The Summit Plateau glacier is not a glacier in the true sense, but rather an ice field that fills an extinct volcanic crater, and the ice there reaches more than 130 m (430 ft) thick. The Whangaehu glacier feeds the Whangaehu River, and the Mangatoetoenui glacier is one of the principal sources of the Waikato River, which arises as a series of streams on Ruapehu's eastern slopes. On the western side of the mountain, many of the streams that arise there, such as the Whakapapa and Manganui o te Ao rivers, feed the Whanganui River.

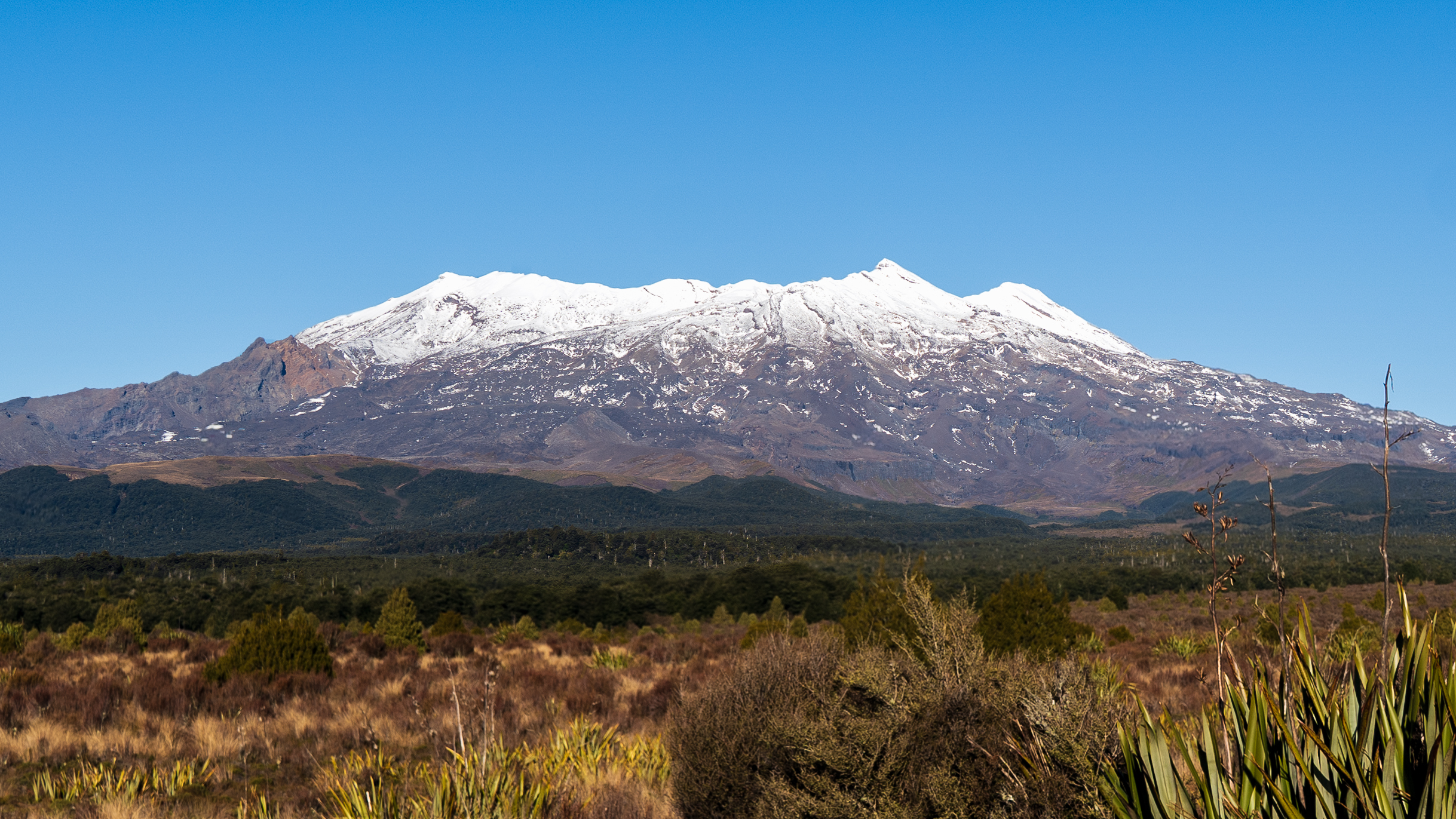
Mount Ruapehu from the northwest, July 2026

Ruapehu's glaciers are situated at the northern limit for the formation of permanent ice in New Zealand, and thus they are extremely sensitive to changes in climate. Surveys of the glaciers undertaken since 1955 have found that the glaciers have all been thinning and retreating, with the exception of the northern crater glacier, which thickened and lengthened after the 1953 outburst of Crater Lake lowered the lake water level.

=== Climate ===
Ruapehu has a polar tundra climate (Köppen: ET) on the upper slopes, with average temperatures ranging from −4 to 15 °C (25 to 59 °F) in summer and −7 to 7 °C (19 to 45 °F) in winter, depending on elevation and cloudiness. On the lower slopes, Ruapehu has a subpolar oceanic climate (Köppen: Cfc).

The prevalent wind direction in the region is westerly or northwesterly, and gale force conditions (i.e. wind speeds higher than 33 kn (61 km/h)) are common on the mountain. Rainfall is higher on the western flanks of Ruapehu than the eastern flanks due to the rain shadow effect. Whakapapa Village receives an average of 2,200 mm (87 in) of rain per year, whereas the Rangipo Desert to the east of Ruapehu receives slightly more than 1,500 mm (59 in) of rain annually. Snow falls on average as low as 1,500 m (4,900 ft) elevation.

Climate data for Mount Ruapehu (Whakapapa Village), elevation 1,097 m (3,599 ft), (1991–2020)
Month	Jan	Feb	Mar	Apr	May	Jun	Jul	Aug	Sep	Oct	Nov	Dec	Year
Mean daily maximum °C (°F)	18.3 (64.9)	18.2 (64.8)	16.2 (61.2)	13.0 (55.4)	10.0 (50.0)	7.5 (45.5)	6.9 (44.4)	7.3 (45.1)	9.1 (48.4)	11.0 (51.8)	13.6 (56.5)	15.9 (60.6)	12.3 (54.0)
Daily mean °C (°F)	12.5 (54.5)	12.8 (55.0)	11.0 (51.8)	8.5 (47.3)	6.1 (43.0)	3.8 (38.8)	3.2 (37.8)	3.5 (38.3)	4.9 (40.8)	6.5 (43.7)	8.4 (47.1)	10.9 (51.6)	7.7 (45.8)
Mean daily minimum °C (°F)	6.7 (44.1)	7.4 (45.3)	5.8 (42.4)	4.0 (39.2)	2.1 (35.8)	0.1 (32.2)	−0.6 (30.9)	−0.4 (31.3)	0.7 (33.3)	1.9 (35.4)	3.1 (37.6)	5.8 (42.4)	3.1 (37.5)
Average rainfall mm (inches)	171.9 (6.77)	156.9 (6.18)	161.1 (6.34)	204.5 (8.05)	253.7 (9.99)	271.9 (10.70)	280.2 (11.03)	259.3 (10.21)	283.0 (11.14)	276.9 (10.90)	245.5 (9.67)	245.1 (9.65)	2,810 (110.63)
Source: NIWA

=== Severe weather incidents ===
Weather conditions can be changeable over the day, and mountain visitors are advised to be prepared and carry basic survival equipment. Severe weather has claimed several lives over the years, including a party of five NZ Army soldiers and one RNZN naval rating, caught in a week-long storm while undergoing winter survival training in 1990. The same storm also trapped an experienced Japanese mountaineer when the weather unexpectedly closed in on him, but he built a snow cave and sheltered in it until he was rescued days later.

Extreme weather conditions have caused visitors to be trapped on the mountain in the past. In 2003, about 350 visitors to Whakapapa skifield and 70 staff had to stay overnight in various lodges at Iwikau village (small village at the top of mountain road) after a snow storm made the road too dangerous to descend. In 2008 extreme weather resulted in about 2000 visitors being evacuated from Whakapapa skifield, with cars being led down the mountain in groups of five. About 100 cars were left at the skifield overnight.

== Geology ==
Map centred on Mount Ruapehu to show approximate selected surface volcanic deposits around it with andesitic deposits shaded red. Vents and cones or craters active in the last 15,000 years are shaded orange-yellow with craters in yellow outline. Lakes in vents are outlined in blue. To the north the volcanic deposits are continuous with those from Mount Tongariro and beyond this is Lake Rotoaira and the andesitic deposits of Pihanga. Mixed (e.g. lahars) and sedimentary deposits are not coloured. Clicking on the map enlarges it, and enables panning and mouseover of volcanic deposits name/wikilink and ages before present for wider volcanic context. The key to the shading of other volcanics that are shown (active in last million years odd) with panning is basalt (shades of brown/orange), monogenetic basalts, undifferentiated basalts, arc basalts, arc ring basalts, dacite, basaltic andesite, rhyolite, (ignimbrite is lighter shades of violet), and plutonic or intusive (grey). White shading has been used for postulated calderas (usually subsurface now).

Ruapehu is a composite andesitic stratovolcano located at the southern end of the Taupō Volcanic Zone and forming part of the Tongariro Volcanic Centre. Volcanism at Ruapehu is caused by the subduction of the Pacific Plate under the Australian Plate at the Hikurangi Trough to the east of the North Island. Ruapehu has erupted from multiple craters over its lifetime, however, only one crater is presently active, a deep crater at the southern end of the summit plateau which is filled with hot, acidic water, dubbed Crater Lake (Te Wai ā-moe). The lake water currently covers separate north and central vents.

Ruapehu sits on a basement of Mesozoic greywacke overlain by a thin layer of sediments of the Wanganui Basin, composed of sands, silts, shell beds, and limestone. It has not been clearly established when Ruapehu first began erupting, only that eruptions began at least 250,000 years ago and possibly as early as 340,000 years ago. Ruapehu has been built in four distinct stages of relatively intense eruptive activity followed by periods of relative quiet. Each of these four stages of activity has left behind distinct rock formations, named the Te Herenga Formation (erupted 250,000–180,000 years ago), the Wahianoa Formation (erupted 160,000–115,000 years ago), the Mangawhero Formation (erupted 55,000–15,000 years ago), and the Whakapapa Formation (erupted 15,000–2,000 years ago). Each of these rock formations is composed of lava flows and tuff breccias, and studies of these formations has revealed how volcanic activity at Ruapehu has developed over time. During the Te Herenga stage of activity, magma rose quickly through the crust during eruptions. However, by 160,000 years ago a complex network of magma dikes and sills had formed in the crust under the volcano, and lava erupted since that time shows signs of extensive mixing between different magma chambers prior to eruptions.

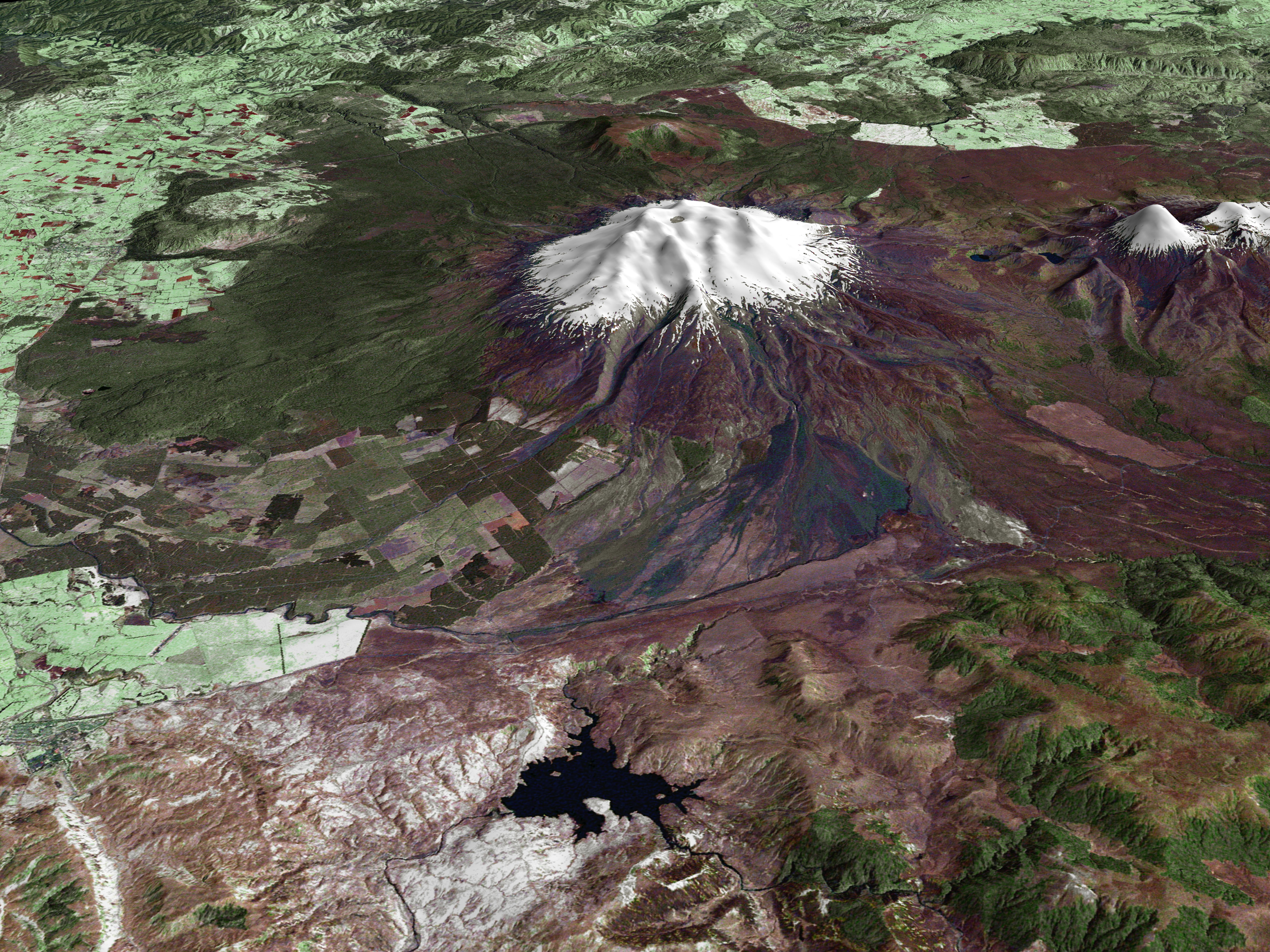
A composite satellite image looking west across Ruapehu, with the older eroded volcano Hauhungatahi visible behind it, and the cone of Ngauruhoe visible to the right.

In more recent times, volcanic activity has been centred on Crater Lake. There are two active vents under the lake, dubbed North Vent and Central Vent. Activity is characterised by cyclic heating and cooling of the lake over periods of 6–12 months. Each heating cycle is marked by increased seismic activity under the crater and is accompanied by increased emission of volcanic gases, indicating that the vents under Crater Lake are open to gas escape. Evidence suggests that an open-vent system such as this has been in place throughout Ruapehu's 250,000 year history. This prevents build-up of pressure and results in relatively small, frequent eruptions (every 20–30 years on average) at Ruapehu compared to other andesitic volcanoes around the world.

Crater Lake is emptied by major eruptions, such as the ones in 1945 and 1995–1996, but refills after eruptions subside, fed by melting snow and vented steam. In historic times, major eruptions have deposited a tephra dam across the lake's outlet, preventing lake overflow into the Whangaehu valley. The dam collapses after several years causing a large lahar down the valley. The tephra dam created by the 1945 eruptions collapsed on 24 December 1953, sending a lahar down the Whangaehu River and causing the Tangiwai disaster. 151 people died when the lahar swept away the Tangiwai railway bridge just before an express train crossed it. Another dam was deposited by the 1995–1996 eruptions, which collapsed on 18 March 2007. A warning system, the Eastern Ruapehu Lahar Alarm and Warning System (ERLAWS) system began operation on the mountain in 2002 to detect such a collapse and alert the relevant authorities. The ERLAWS system detected the 2007 lahar, and roads were closed and railway traffic stopped until the lahar had subsided.

=== Early eruptive history ===
The earliest known volcanic activity in Tongariro National Park was approximately 933,000 ± 46,000 years ago at Hauhungatahi, northwest of Ruapehu. Subsequently, andesitic clasts found 100 km southwest of Ruapehu, near Whanganui, demonstrate that volcanism was likely present in the Ruapehu area 340,000 years ago. However, the oldest rocks on Ruapehu itself are approximately 250,000 years old. Eruptions during this period are believed to have built a steep volcanic cone around a central crater, which would have been located somewhere near the present-day upper Pinnacle Ridge. Cone-building eruptions ceased about 180,000 years ago, and the cone began to be eroded away by glacial action. Rock formations that date to this period are collectively named the Te Herenga Formation, and today these formations be seen at Pinnacle Ridge, Te Herenga Ridge, and Whakapapanui Valley, all on the northwestern slopes of Ruapehu.

Approximately 160,000 years ago, cone-building eruptions began again, this time from a crater that is thought to have lain northwest of present-day Mitre Peak (Ringatoto)—southeast of the original Te Herenga vent. Eruptions continued until approximately 115,000 years ago, and the lava erupted during this period is known as the Wahianoa Formation. This formation has also been heavily eroded by glacial activity, and it now forms the southeastern flanks of modern Ruapehu. The formation consists of lava flows and tuff breccias.

Beginning approximately 55,000 years ago, a third phase of cone-building eruptions began, creating the Mangawhero Formation. This formation was erupted onto the eroded Wahianoa Formation in two phases: the first occurring 55,000–45,000 years ago and the second 30,000–15,000 years ago. Multiple summit craters were active during this period, all lying between Tahurangi and the northern summit plateau. Possible Parasitic eruptions also occurred at Pukeonake, a scoria cone to the north-west of Ruapehu and at several isolated craters near Ohakune making up the Ohakune volcanic complex and the maar lakes of Rangatauanui and Rangatauaiti. The Mangawhero Formation can be found over most of modern Ruapehu, and it forms most of the mountain's high peaks as well as the Turoa skifield.

=== Holocene activity ===
Medium size tephra eruptions of Ruapehu since the 232 CE
Taupo eruption

Lava flows that have been erupted from Ruapehu since the last glacial maximum are called the Whakapapa Formation. These flows all erupted between 15,000 and 2,000 years ago from a number of different craters on the summit of Ruapehu as well as from craters on the northern and southern flanks of the mountain. Rangataua on the southern flanks had a large lava flow between 15,000 and 10,000 years ago.

Approximately 10,000 years ago, a series of major eruptions occurred, not just on Ruapehu, but also at the Tama Lakes between Ruapehu and Tongariro volcanoes. This period of intense eruptions is called the Pahoka-Mangamate event and is thought to have lasted between 200 and 400 years. On Ruapehu, lava was erupted from Saddle Cone—a flank crater on the northern slopes—and from another crater on the southern slopes. This southern crater erupted three times, and lava flows from this crater travelled nearly 14 km to the south.

There is evidence that a sector collapse on the northwestern slopes about 9,400 years ago formed the amphitheatre that now comprises the Whakapapa skifield and left an extensive avalanche deposit on the northwestern ring plain that can still be seen today. Since then eruptions have been an order of magnitude lower in intensity and volume. Accordingly, most of the 150 km^{3} (36 cu mi) cone and 150 km^{3} (36 cu mi) ring-plain is older than 10,000 years. Eruptions between 10,000 and 2,500 years ago generated lava flows that all flowed into the Whakapapa amphitheatre and created the slopes of the modern skifield.

For the past 2,000 years, activity at Ruapehu has been largely focused through a crater lake at the summit. Eruptive activity has typically consisted of relatively small but explosive phreatomagmatic eruptions occurring every few decades and lasting several months each. The eruptive record is only well understood from tephra deposits before 1950 for 1718 years from the Taupō Hatepe eruption in 232 CE. Over this period there are 30 assigned tephra units by composition studies to Ruapehu and in the 370 years before 1950 the mean time between these months of eruptive period was 40 years.

In recorded history, these eruptions have occurred about 50 years apart, in 1895 (lahar), 1945 and 1995–1996. Minor phreatic or hydrothermal eruptions occur every few years on average, with notable minor eruptions occurring in 1969, 1975, and 2007. More than 600 eruptive events of various sizes have been documented since 1830.

=== 1945 eruptions and 1953 lahar ===
Ruapehu entered an eruptive phase in March 1945 after several weeks of volcanic tremors. The first indication of an eruption was reported on 8 March, with ashfall seen on the eastern slopes. A lava dome was observed in Crater Lake on 19 March but was destroyed in a series of explosive eruptions over the following week. A second, larger lava dome appeared in May, which continued to grow over the following months and had emptied Crater Lake of water by July.

Eruptions increased from August through November. A particularly powerful eruption in the early hours of 21 August was heard in Hawkes Bay and the Tararua District, loud enough to awaken people from sleep and cause alarm. Eruptions began declining in December and had ended by January.

The eruptions dispersed ash across most of the North Island, and eruption columns could be seen from as far afield as Palmerston North, Whanganui, and Hawkes Bay. Ash caused disruption to several North Island communities, entering houses, causing eye and throat irritation, and damaging paintwork on cars. Crop damage was reported in Ohakune, and the water supply at Taumarunui was disrupted.

After eruptions subsided in late December, Crater Lake slowly began refilling, with a "boiling lake" already filling the bottom of the crater by mid-January. A tephra dam had formed at the lake's normal outlet during the eruptions, which eventually collapsed on 24 December 1953 causing a lahar that led to the Tangiwai disaster with the loss of 151 lives when the Tangiwai railway bridge across the Whangaehu River collapsed while the lahar was in full flood, just before an express train crossed it.

=== 1969 and 1975 eruptions ===
Ruapehu saw a period of heightened activity between 1966 and 1982, with multiple small eruptions occurring in Crater Lake and two larger eruptions in 1969 and 1975, which ejected rocks across the summit region and produced significant lahars.

The eruption in 1969 occurred in the early hours of 22 June. It was a moderate phreatic eruption, which blasted rocks up to 1 km northwest of the crater and sent lahars down several valleys. The Whakapapa skifield was left covered in mud. This was the largest eruption since 1945.

A larger phreatic eruption occurred at 3:59 a.m. on 24 April 1975, blasting rocks up to 1.6 km northwest of the crater, against the wind, and depositing ash more than 100 km to the southeast. Nine minutes of seismic activity preceded the eruption, but crater dilation had been measured two weeks earlier. Nearly half of the water in Crater Lake was erupted into the air, which subsequently rained down onto the summit, generating lahars down several river valleys. Lahars which travelled down the Whakapapa and Manganui o te Ao rivers entered the Whanganui River and poisoned it, which affected much of the aquatic life downstream. Additionally, the lahars damaged ski installations on the Whakapapa ski field, several bridges and hydroelectric tunnel intakes, but no loss of life occurred.

Three days later, on the morning of 27 April, Ruapehu erupted again. A series of five eruptions occurred between 7:10 a.m. and 10:18 a.m., sending surges of mud, rocks, and ash northwards across the summit plateau and producing eruption columns up to 500 m high.

The 1975 eruptions deepened Crater Lake from 55 to 60 m to more than 90 m.

=== 1995–1996 eruptions ===
Earthquake swarms to the west of Ruapehu between November 1994 and September 1995 marked the beginning of renewed heightened activity at the volcano. Bursts of earthquake activity immediately preceded rapid rises in the temperature of Crater Lake, with the surface temperature reaching 51.4 °C (124.5 °F) in January 1995—one of the highest temperatures recorded in 30 years and about 10 °C (50 °F) higher than its usual peak temperature. A minor eruption occurred on 26 April, which sent waves against the walls of the crater and damaged some monitoring equipment there. A second eruption on 29 June destroyed the equipment and produced a lahar. Chemical analysis showed that magma was interacting with water under the lake.

The first significant eruption took place at 8:05 a.m. on 18 September 1995, raining tephra onto the summit region and sending lahars down the mountain. On 23 September, an even larger eruption blasted rocks up to 1.5 km from the crater, sent lahars down three valleys, and generated an eruption column 12 km high. Phreatomagmatic eruptions occurred through the rest of the month and throughout October, with some eruptions continuing for hours at a time. Ash fell up to 250 km downwind. Explosive eruptions on 11 October emptied Crater Lake of water.

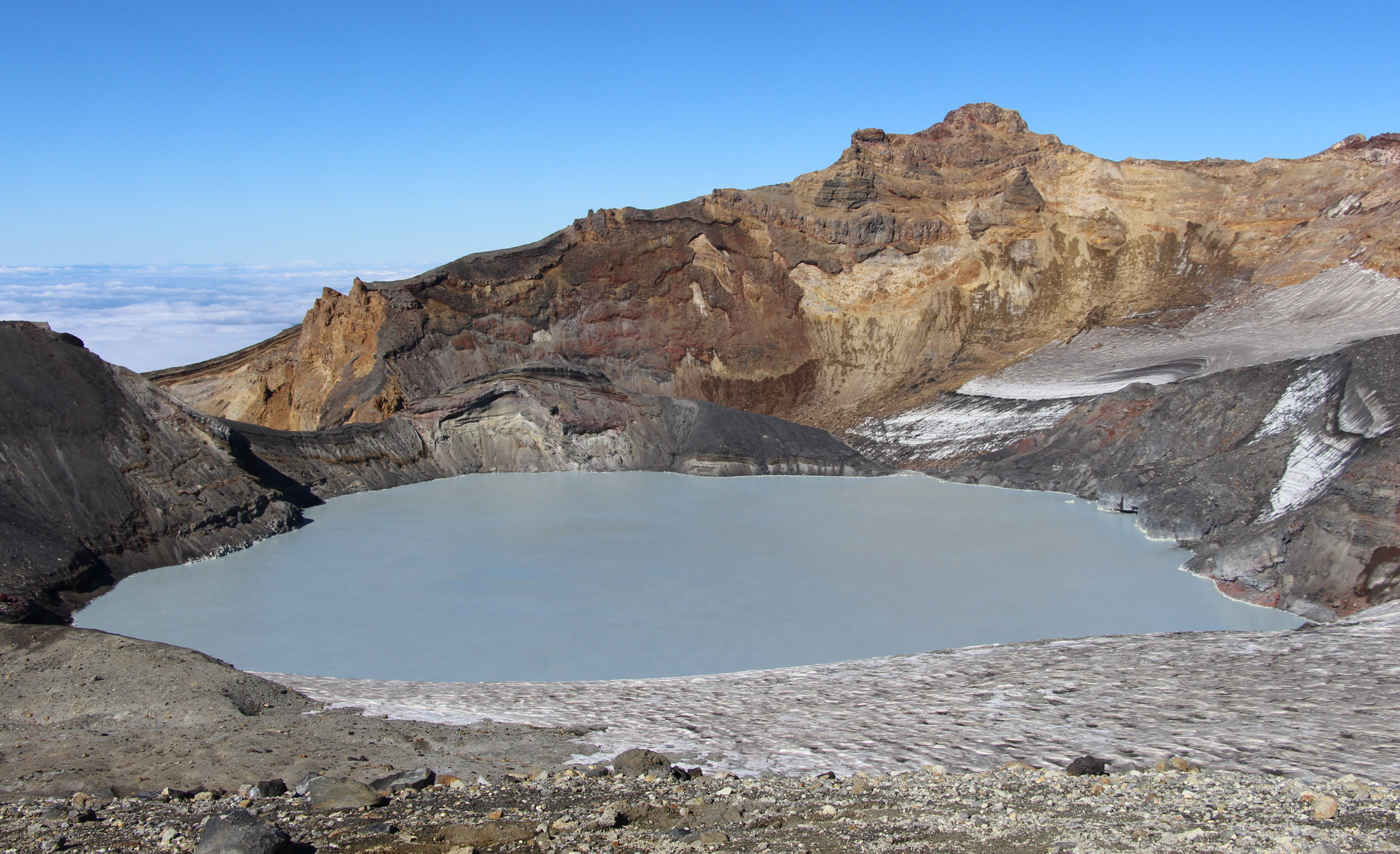
Crater Lake and Tahurangi, the highest peak (top right) in 2016. The 1996 tephra dam is the bluish dark area at lake edge directly below Tahurangi.

Following this, activity died off until 15 June 1996 when renewed seismic activity was recorded. This was followed by eruptions on 17 and 18 June which once again emptied the partially refilled Crater Lake of water. Strombolian eruptions occurred on 27 June and throughout July and August, producing eruption columns more than 10 km high and shooting rocks 1.4 km from the crater.

These eruptions produced more than 7 million tonnes of ash, which contaminated water supplies, destroyed crops, and led to the deaths of livestock. Ash in the Tongariro River also damaged the intake turbines at the Rangipo power station, and ash clouds caused airport closures as far away as Auckland and Wellington. The eruptions also caused closures to the three ski fields on the mountain, costing the region an estimated $100 million in lost revenue. During the 1995–1996 summer period between the eruptions, Ruapehu Alpine Lifts ran its chairlifts up the mountain and organised guided tours to within 500 metres of the crater. Hundreds of tourists visited, even though the volcano was still emitting steam and toxic sulphur gas and the Department of Conservation was warning that further eruptions were possible.

Both the 1995 and 1996 eruptions were filmed and streamed to the internet via a custom-built 'volcano-cam', possibly the first such camera in the world. The website hosting the feed during the 1996 eruption received up to 4000 hits an hour.

=== Lahar danger ===
After the 1996 eruption it was recognised that a catastrophic lahar could again occur when Crater Lake burst the volcanic ash dam blocking the lake outlet as it did in 1953. In 1997, the government proposed digging a trench through the blockage in the wall of Crater Lake, but this was plan was opposed by conservation groups and Māori. A Ngāti Rangi spokesman noted that the mountain was sacred, and said: "as far as we are concerned if these things [lahars] do happen well we step aside. Let them go past". Other plans considered were building a stop bank on the Desert Road, or creating an early-warning system, which would be much more expensive than digging a trench. In 2001, the Eastern Ruapehu Lahar Alarm and Warning System (ERLAWS) system was installed on the mountain to detect a crater wall collapse and alert the relevant authorities. It began operating in 2002. The lake gradually filled with snowmelt and had reached the level of the hard rock rim by January 2005. The lahar finally occurred on 18 March 2007 (see below).

=== 2006 and 2007 activity ===
Ruapehu erupted at 10:24 p.m. on 4 October 2006. The small eruption was marked by a magnitude 2.9 volcanic earthquake and sent waves 4–5 m (16 ft) tall crashing into the wall of the crater. No ash was erupted into the atmosphere, and the eruption is presumed to have occurred entirely underwater.

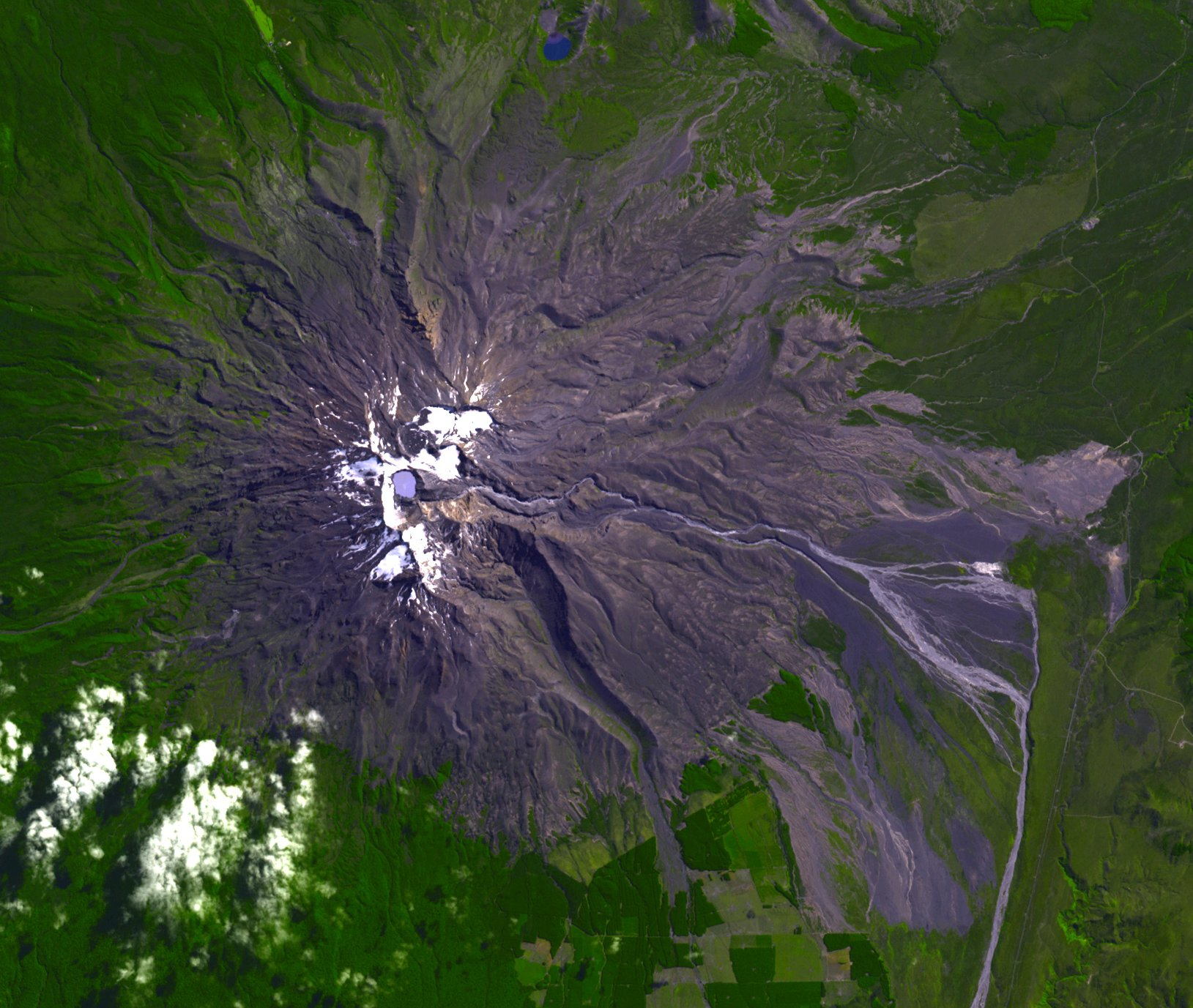
Fresh lahar channels scar Ruapehu's eastern slopes, 2007.

At 11:22 a.m. 18 March 2007, the tephra dam which had been holding back Crater Lake burst, sending a lahar down the mountain. An estimated 1.9–3.8 million cubic metres of mud, rock, and water travelled down the Whangaehu river. ERLAWS activated, sending an alarm to pagers at 11:25 a.m. and automatically activating warning lights and barrier arms to close roads and stop trains. There was no serious damage and no injuries. A toilet block at the Tangiwai memorial was destroyed, but the memorial had already been closed due to the lahar threat. One family was trapped for around 24 hours after the lahar swept away the access route to their home.

At 8:16 p.m. on 25 September 2007, volcanic tremor was detected underneath Ruapehu, which was followed at 8:26 p.m. by an explosive surtseyan eruption. The explosive phase of the eruption lasted for less than a minute and blasted ash, mud, and rocks northward, reaching to about 2 km from Crater Lake. Two climbers were caught in the eruption at Dome Shelter, an alpine hut approximately 600 m from the crater, when the hut was struck by the surge. The climbers nearly drowned before the hut floor gave way and the water drained into the basement seismometer vault. One of them, a 22-year-old primary school teacher, had a leg pinned and crushed by a boulder as the water subsided. A rescue operation was mounted after his companion, who was unable to free him, went down the mountain for help.

The eruption initiated lahars down the Whangaehu valley and the Whakapapa skifield. ERLAWS detected the lahars in the Whangaehu valley. A snow groomer on the Whakapapa skifield narrowly avoided being caught in the lahar there.

=== Current activity and future hazards ===
Only one eruptive event has been recorded at Ruapehu since the 2007 eruption—a minor event on 13 July 2009 when a small volcanic earthquake beneath Crater Lake caused the lake water level to rise 15 cm and triggered a snow slurry lahar in the upper Whangaehu valley. Since then, Crater Lake has continued its regular cycle of heating and increased gas emissions, although with periods of sustained high temperatures that occurred in 2011, 2016 and 2019.

Since 2019, seismic unrest and volcanic activity have decreased. In 2020, the temperature of the crater lake had risen to 40 °C (104 °F). In May 2022, lake temperatures peaked at 41 °C (106 °F). Between May 2022 and September 2025, lake temperatures have steadily decreased, however, substantial amounts of volcanic gas continue to be released. This demonstrates that an open pathway persists between the magma source and the lake, allowing gas to escape and reducing the likelihood of pressure buildup beneath the crater. Scientists interpret this behaviour as shorter durations of volcanic gas entering the lake. Other monitoring indicators—including earthquakes, tremor, gas emissions, and lake chemistry—are all within normal ranges.

Eruptions at Ruapehu are expected to continue as they have for the past 2,000 years, with frequent minor eruptions and more significant events every 20–30 years, although the possibility of larger events like the Pahoka-Mangamate event cannot be ruled out. The previous activity trend until 10,000 years ago was about 7.5 km^{3} (1.8 cu mi) erupted each 10,000 years. Minor eruptions, such as the one in 2007, especially if they are hydrothermal, can occur at any time without warning. However, in historic times, major eruptions such as the ones in 1995–96 have only occurred within periods of enhanced activity.

The main recent volcanic hazard at Ruapehu is from lahars. Two major lahar paths run through the Whakapapa skifield, and in recent times, lahars have travelled through the ski field in 1969, 1975, 1995, and 2007. An eruption warning system operates in the ski field to warn skiers in the event of another eruption. Lahars also represent a significant hazard to surrounding river valleys, particularly the Whangaehu River, which is crossed by national highways, the North Island Main Trunk railway line, and electricity transmission lines. Large, destructive lahars have been observed in the Whangaehu River in 1862, 1895, 1953, 1975, and 2007.

GNS Science continuously monitors Ruapehu using a network of seismographs, GPS stations, microphones and webcams. Chemical analysis of the water in Crater Lake is regularly undertaken along with airborne gas measurements. Live data can be viewed on the GeoNet website.

== Recreational ==
The mountain, as part of Tongariro National Park is host to a wide range of recreational activities.

=== Skiing ===
Since the first ski field developments in 1923, Ruapehu has had three ski areas developed, Whakapapa on the north-western side, Tūroa on the south western slopes, and a club Tukino field on the east of the mountain. The commercial developments have not been a consistent success, with at least two business failures by 2023. While as of 2001, Mount Ruapehu had the largest total ski area in New Zealand, developments in the South Island may see by 2025 the establishment there of the largest single commercial ski area in New Zealand. A 60-year concession for commercial ski field operation was granted to the then operator of the Whakapapa ski field, in 2015. After the operator went into receivership in 2023 a new operator has expressed interest in taking over the Whakapapa concession. From April 2024, Tūroa operated by Pure Tūroa Limited has a limited ten year concession.

Winter access to the mountain, car parks and ski fields has restrictions.

=== Climbing and walking ===
There are multiple walking tracks and routes on the mountain's slopes. Alpine huts are provided for trampers and climbers. These are mainly owned by private clubs. Blyth Hut, Lupton Hut (private), Mangaehuehu Hut, Mangaturuturu Hut, Rangipo Hut, and Whangaehu Hut on the mountain are potentially listed as available for use by the Department of Conservation. Campsites also exist on the slopes of the mountain.

==== Waihohonu Hut ====
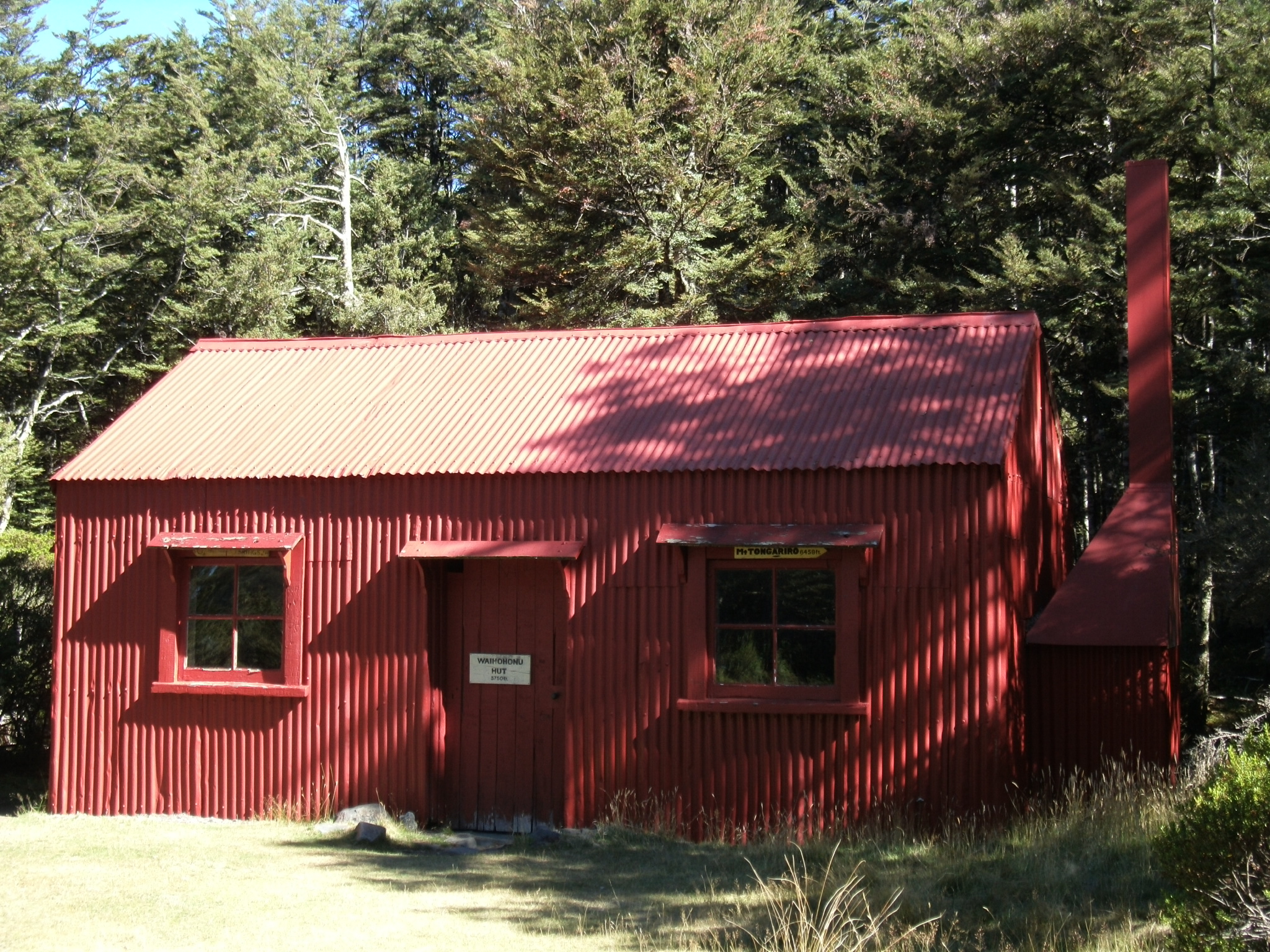
Waihohonu Hut

Waihohonu Hut is a historic cabin located in the Tongariro National Park. The cabin was constructed in 1904 and is now the oldest extant mountain hut in New Zealand. It was registered as a category 1 historic building with Heritage New Zealand in 1993. It was used early in its history as a stop over for stage coaches.

==== Glacier Hut ====
Glacier Hut now serves as a skiing museum. It was built in 1923 and was New Zealand's first purpose-built structure for the sport of skiing.

== Notable people associated with Ruapehu ==
- George Beetham – climbed the mountain in 1879 and 1881
- Ethel Birch – climbed the mountain in 1881, the first European woman to do so
- William Birch – climbed the mountain in 1881

== In popular culture ==
Some scenes of the fictional Mordor and Mount Doom in Peter Jackson's The Lord of the Rings film trilogy were filmed on the slopes of Mount Ruapehu.

== See also ==
- List of mountains of New Zealand by height
- List of volcanic eruptions by death toll
- List of volcanoes in New Zealand
- Volcanism of New Zealand
