= Rangatauanui =

Lake in the central North Island of New Zealand

- Rangataua Crater Lake
- Location within New Zealand
- Map Rangatauanui and Rangatauaiti maar lakes. Known active east - west Taupō Rift termination fault surface traces are in red. (Note: Dating and other details such as relationships to fault structures rely on a 1984 study and there have been potentially relevant advances in geological techniques since then.) Click on the map to enable mouse over that can show feature names.
- Location: North Island
- Coordinates: 39°26′02″S 175°22′44″E
- Basin countries: New Zealand
- Surface area: 2.5 ha (6.2 acres)
- Average depth: 7 m (23 ft)
- Surface elevation: 580 m (1,900 ft)

Rangatauanui is a maar lake south of Ohakune in the North Island of New Zealand. It is in the area of the southernmost volcanic activity in the Taupō Rift. Its undisturbed lake sediments have proved useful in reconstructing recent climate proxy records for New Zealand.

== Geography ==
It is 3 km (1.9 mi) south of Ohakune in the Ngā Roto-o-Rangataua Scenic Reserve, which before 2019 was known as the Ohakune Lakes Scenic Reserve. This has an area of about the about 58 ha (140 acres). Historically it has been called Rangataua Crater Lake. Adjacent is another smaller maar lake, Rangatauaiti, in the area that has been called the Rangataua craters in the geological literature.

== Geology ==
Along with Rangatauaiti it is a maar lake, believed to have been formed about 30,000 years ago. The nearest other volcanoes are to the north, being the Ohakune volcanic complex and it is unclear if the maar lakes are similar potential Ruapehu parasites, representing the southernmost vents of the Taupō Volcanic Zone which is defined as terminating at Mount Ruapehu. The structure of the southern Ruapehu magma system is unknown and evidence exists in the case of the Ohakune volcanic complex for an approximately 16–18 km (9.9–11.2 mi) depth for the originating magma reservoir, fair magma ascent rates and that the magma conduit may be independent of the main feeder system of Mount Ruapehu. (Note: The volcanoes are technically either one of the most southern in the Taupō Rift or the Taupō Volcanic Zone depending upon which definition is used of the later. Unresolved are the issues of whether they are parasitic volcanoes to Mount Ruapehu, volcanoes with separate magma sources or a single volcano with a single magma source being part of the Ohakune volcanic complex.) Either way these volcanoes may be the present propagating tip of the arc system that extends from the Taupō Rift through the South Kermadec Ridge Seamounts and Kermadec Islands to beyond Tonga.

Because the lake has no major inflows or outflows sediment cores have been undisturbed, and provide a useful dated tephra record of nearby eruptions.

=== Climate studies ===
Consistent with Tasmanian and Chilean studies there is a peak in summer temperatures at about 16,000 years ago similar to the later Holocene. Summer temperatures then cooled from 14.5 to 12.9 cal ka BP, before peaking at 11.7 cal ka BP. Forest developed after 11.5 cal ka BP, similar to today's and the climate record here is consistent with other New Zealand Holocene studies.

== Ecology ==
Currently the lake is surrounded by wetland for 50 m (160 ft) dominated by New Zealand flax and also containing raupō, mānuka, and cabbage trees. Within the surrounding reserve associated with the two lakes is regenerating native forest containing the trees kahikatea, kāmahi, and rewarewa, as well as the epiphyte northern rātā.
