= 1954 New Zealand bravery awards =

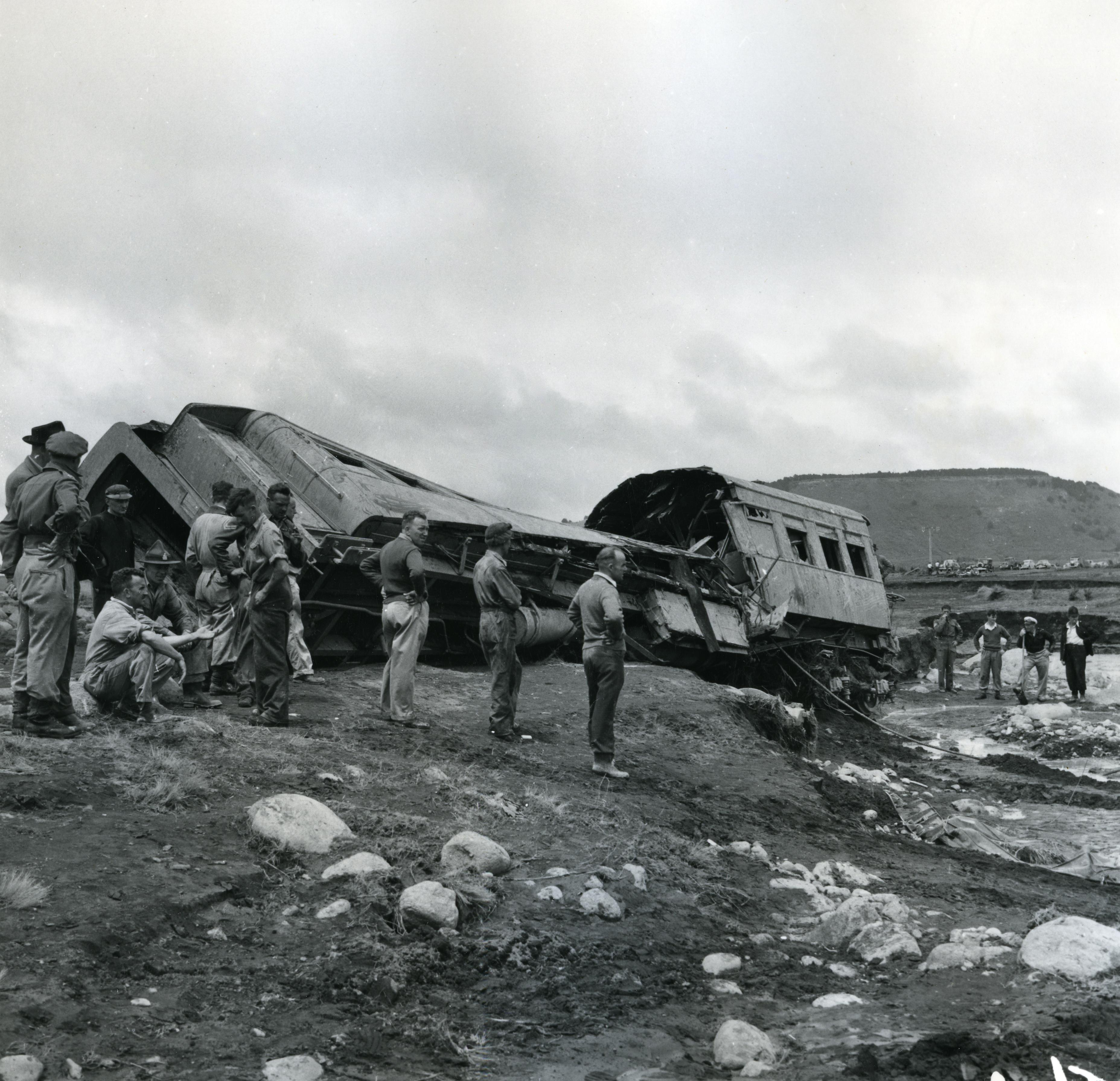
Train wreckage on the banks of the Whangaehu River following the Tangiwai disaster

The 1954 New Zealand bravery awards were announced via a special honours list on 29 January 1954, and recognised four people for acts of bravery in the aftermath of the Tangiwai disaster on 24 December 1953.

== George Medal (GM) ==
- Arthur Cyril Ellis – postmaster, Taihape.
- John Warren Holman – of South Beach, Plimmerton.

== British Empire Medal (BEM) ==
Civil division

- Arthur Dewar Bell – of Raetihi.
- William Ian Inglis – railway guard, of Ngaio, Wellington.
