= Makotuku River =

Mākōtuku River
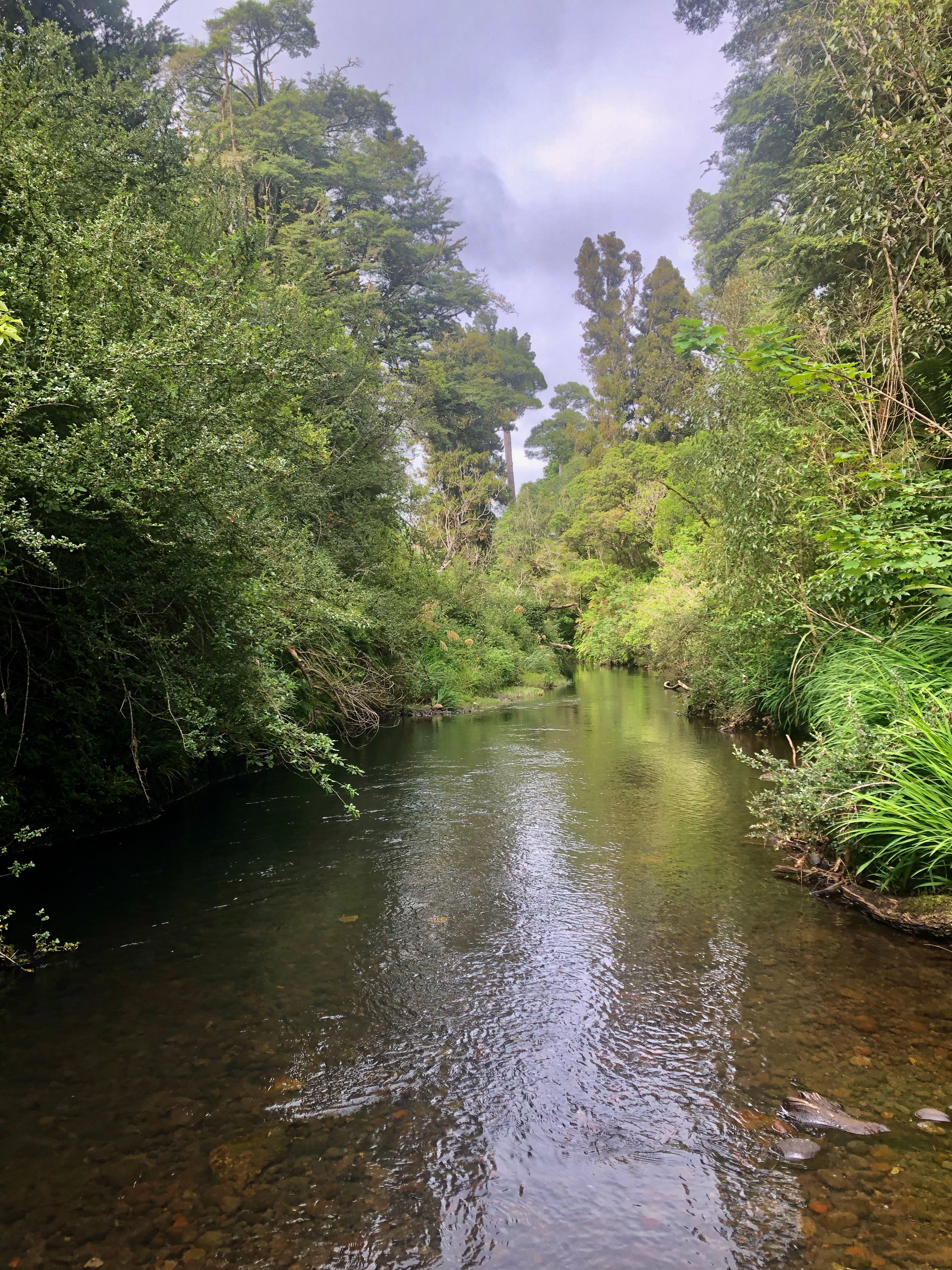
- Mākōtuku River at Raetihi
- Etymology: Māori meaning "white heron stream"
- Native name: Mākōtuku (Māori)

Location
- Country: New Zealand
- Region: Manawatū-Whanganui
- District: Ruapehu District
- Settlements: Horopito, Raetihi

Physical characteristics
- Source: Mount Ruapehu
  - location: Sunset Ridge, Tūroa skifield
  - coordinates: 39°18′7″S 175°31′44″E
  - elevation: 1,700 metres (5,600 ft)
- Mouth: Mangawhero River
  - coordinates: 39°28′8″S 175°18′4″E
  - elevation: 455 metres (1,493 ft)
- Length: 40 km (25 mi)

Basin features
- Progression: Mākōtuku River → Mangawhero River → Whangaehu River
- River system: Whangaehu River

The Mākōtuku River is a river of the west of New Zealand's North Island. It flows southwest from Tūroa ski field, on the slopes of Mount Ruapehu, and passes through the town of Raetihi before its confluence with the Mangawhero River. It has been affected by several lahars over the last 160,000 years.

The New Zealand Ministry for Culture and Heritage gives a translation of "white heron stream" for Mākōtuku.

== Water quality ==
The long term e. coli rating for the river at Raetihi is poor.

=== Water supply ===
Raetihi's drinking water comes from the river. In 2018 Veolia added activated carbon dosing, coagulation, flocculation, a lamella settler, filters and UV disinfection to the previous two settling ponds and chlorination, to minimise the effect of future pollution events.

=== Oil spills ===
In December 1979, 17,000 litres (3,700 imp gal; 4,500 US gal) of heating oil (diesel and kerosene) and, in September 2013, 19,000 L (4,200 imp gal; 5,000 US gal) of diesel spilt into the river at the Turoa ski field, 27 km (17 mi) upstream. The 2013 leak required Raetihi to have 21 days of water supply from road tankers. The leaks had impacts on mayflies, lichens, mosses, fish and whio. Ruapehu Alpine Lifts Ltd was fined $300,000 for the 2013 spill.

== Hydro electricity ==
The 60 kW Raetihi hydro-electric scheme produces about 1.75 GWh (6.3 TJ) a year and was built in 1918, about 6 km (3.7 mi) north of Raetihi. Its water comes from the Mākōtuku River, Makara Stream, Makaraiti Stream and a tributary of Mangaone Stream. It has a head of 116 m (381 ft) from its headpond to its generator, near the Orautoha Stream. The original generator remains in use.

== Mākōtuku River Walkway ==
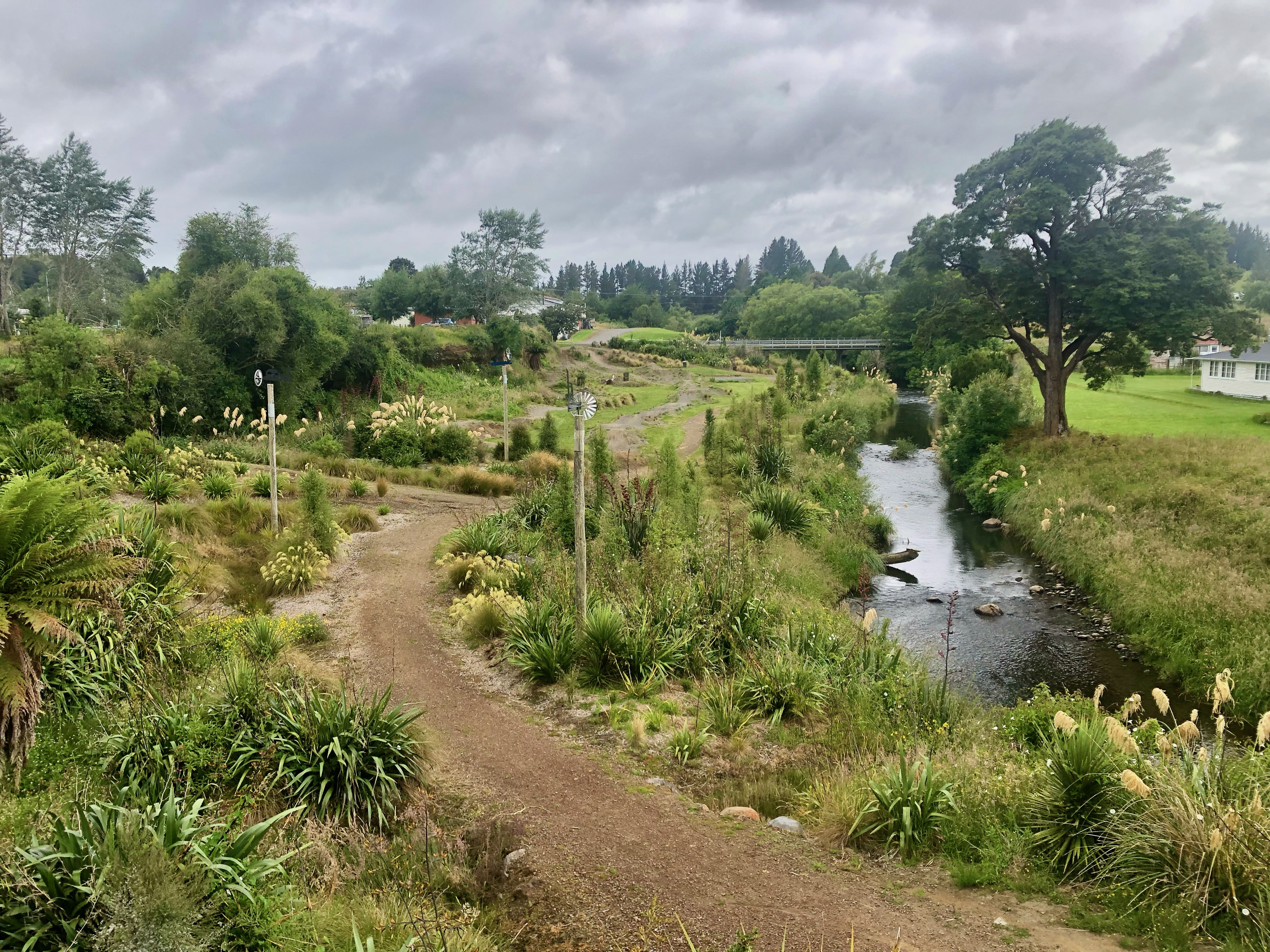
Mākōtuku River, walkway and Raetihi-Ohakune road bridge

The 1.2 km (0.75 mi) Mākōtuku River Walkway was upgraded in 2021, with loop tracks on the east side of Raetihi. Much of the funding for the work came from the compensation paid after the 2013 oil spill.

== See also ==
- List of rivers of New Zealand
