= Tangiwai disaster =

1953 railway accident in New Zealand

Tangiwai train disaster
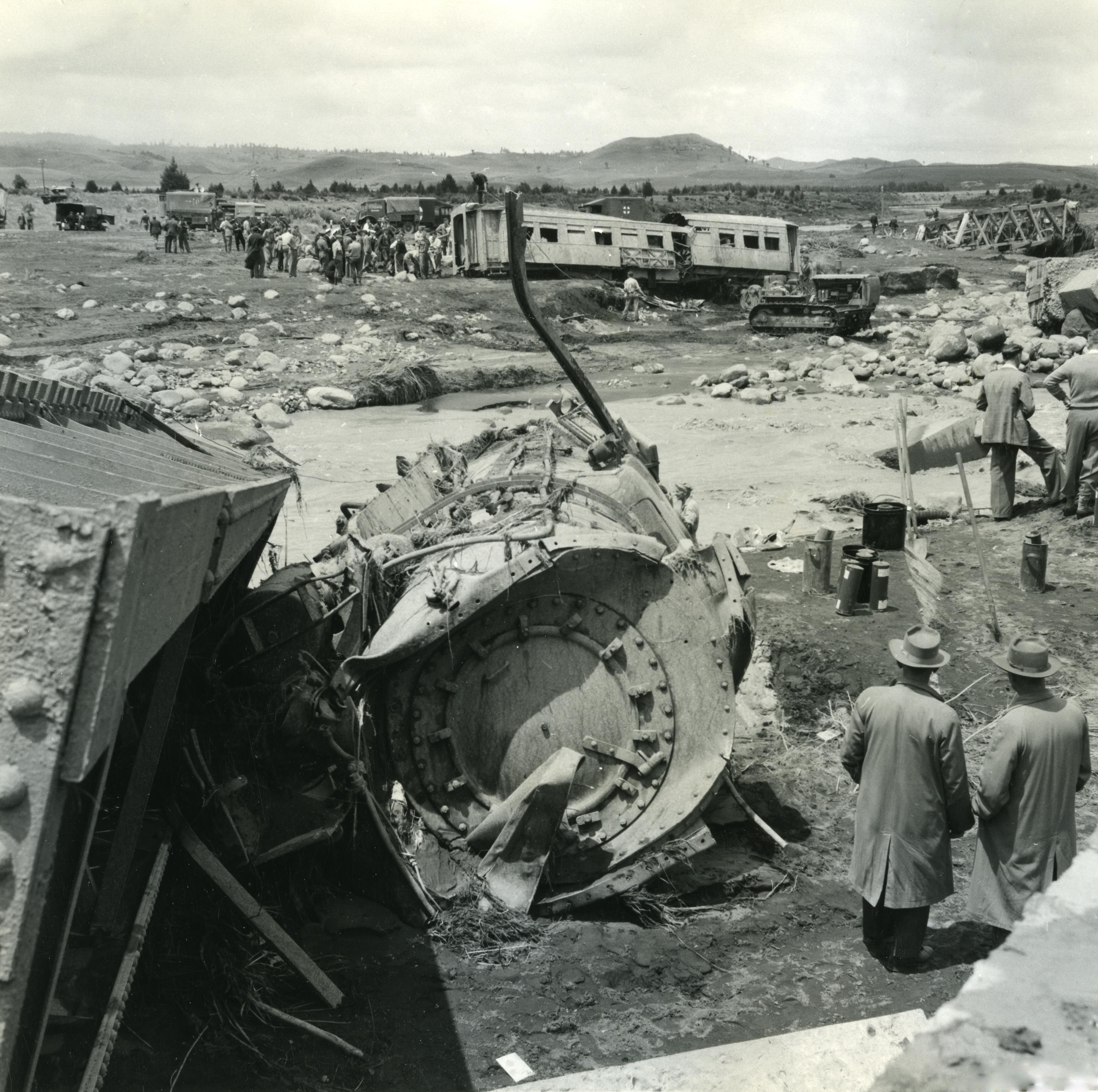
- The wreckage of the K^{A} locomotive, the sixth carriage and the rail bridge, in the Whangaehu River at Tangiwai, 25 December 1953.

Details
- Date: 24 December 1953; 72 years ago 22:21 NZDT
- Location: Whangaehu River Bridge, Tangiwai, North Island, New Zealand
- Coordinates: 39°27′51″S 175°34′36″E
- Country: New Zealand
- Line: North Island Main Trunk
- Operator: New Zealand Railways Department
- Incident type: Locomotive Train Derailment
- Cause: Bridge collapse due to lahar from Mount Ruapehu

Statistics
- Trains: 1
- Passengers: 285
- Deaths: 151
- Injured: 7

The Tangiwai disaster was a railway accident that occurred at 10:21 p.m. on 24 December 1953, when a railway bridge over the Whangaehu River collapsed beneath an express passenger train at Tangiwai, North Island, New Zealand. The locomotive and the first six carriages derailed into the river, killing 151 people. The subsequent board of inquiry found that the accident was caused by the failure of the tephra dam holding back nearby Mount Ruapehu's Crater Lake, creating a rapid mudflow (lahar) in the Whangaehu River which destroyed one of the bridge piers at Tangiwai only minutes before the train reached the bridge. The volcano at Mount Ruapehu was not erupting at the time. The disaster remains New Zealand's deadliest rail accident.

== Bridge collapse ==
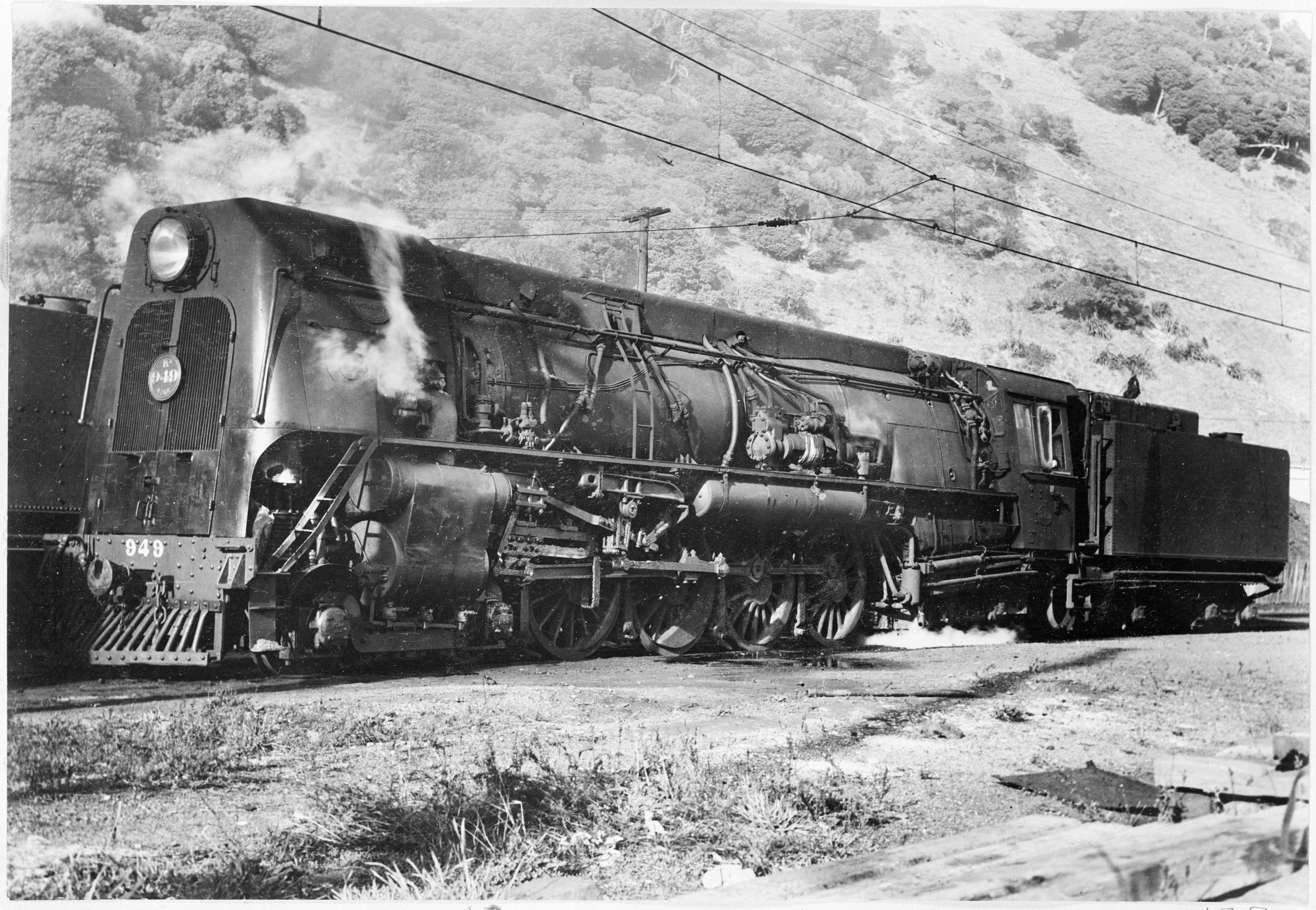
K^{A} 949, the locomotive involved in the accident

On 24 December 1953, the 3 p.m. express train from Wellington to Auckland consisted of a K^{A} class steam locomotive hauling 11 carriages: five second-class carriages, four first-class carriages, a Guard's van and a postal van. With 285 passengers and crew, the train was stated by a witness—the station agent at Tangiwai railway station—to have passed through right on time at 10:20 pm at about 40 miles per hour (65 km/h). The specified maximum track speed between Hīhītahi (to the south of Tangiwai) and Ohakune (to the north) at the time was 50 miles per hour (80 km/h). There was no evidence presented to the board of inquiry regarding any calculations made or indications of the speed of the steam locomotive either as it approached the incident site or at the same time of the incident.

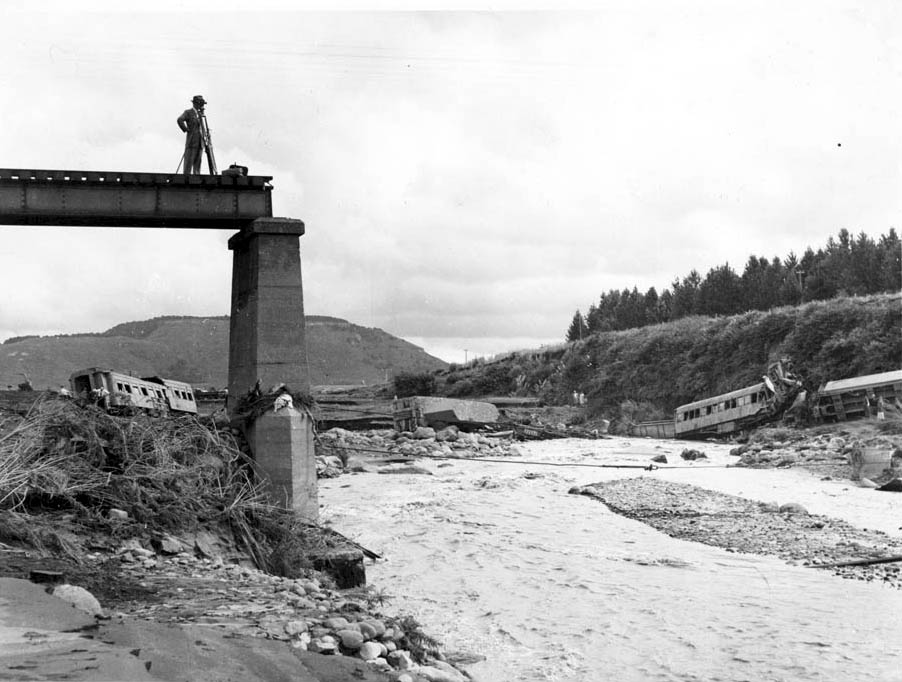
The destroyed bridge after the disaster

Approaching the bridge over the Whangaehu River at Tangiwai, in response either to passerby Cyril Ellis standing by the track and waving a torch or upon seeing the condition of the bridge, driver Charles Parker shut off steam and initiated an emergency air brake application, while his fireman, Lance Redman, shut off the oil supply valve for the fire. These actions can be assumed from the state of locomotive cab controls observed following the incident. However, these actions couldn't stop the train from running onto the bridge, which collapsed, sending the locomotive, its oil tender and the first five second-class carriages into the flooded river. The leading first-class carriage teetered over the edge of the bridge before its coupling to the rest of the train snapped with a crack, and it rolled down into the river as well. The remaining last three first-class carriages, the guard's van and the postal van remained on the track.

The death toll of 151 people consisted of Parker, Redman, 148 second-class passengers and one first-class passenger. Twenty of the bodies were no longer found and were presumed to have been carried 120 km (75 mi) down-river to the sea. Among the dead was Nerissa Love, the fiancée of cricketer Bob Blair, who was playing in a Test match in South Africa at the same time. On going out to bat after his loss, Blair received a standing ovation.

== Aftermath ==
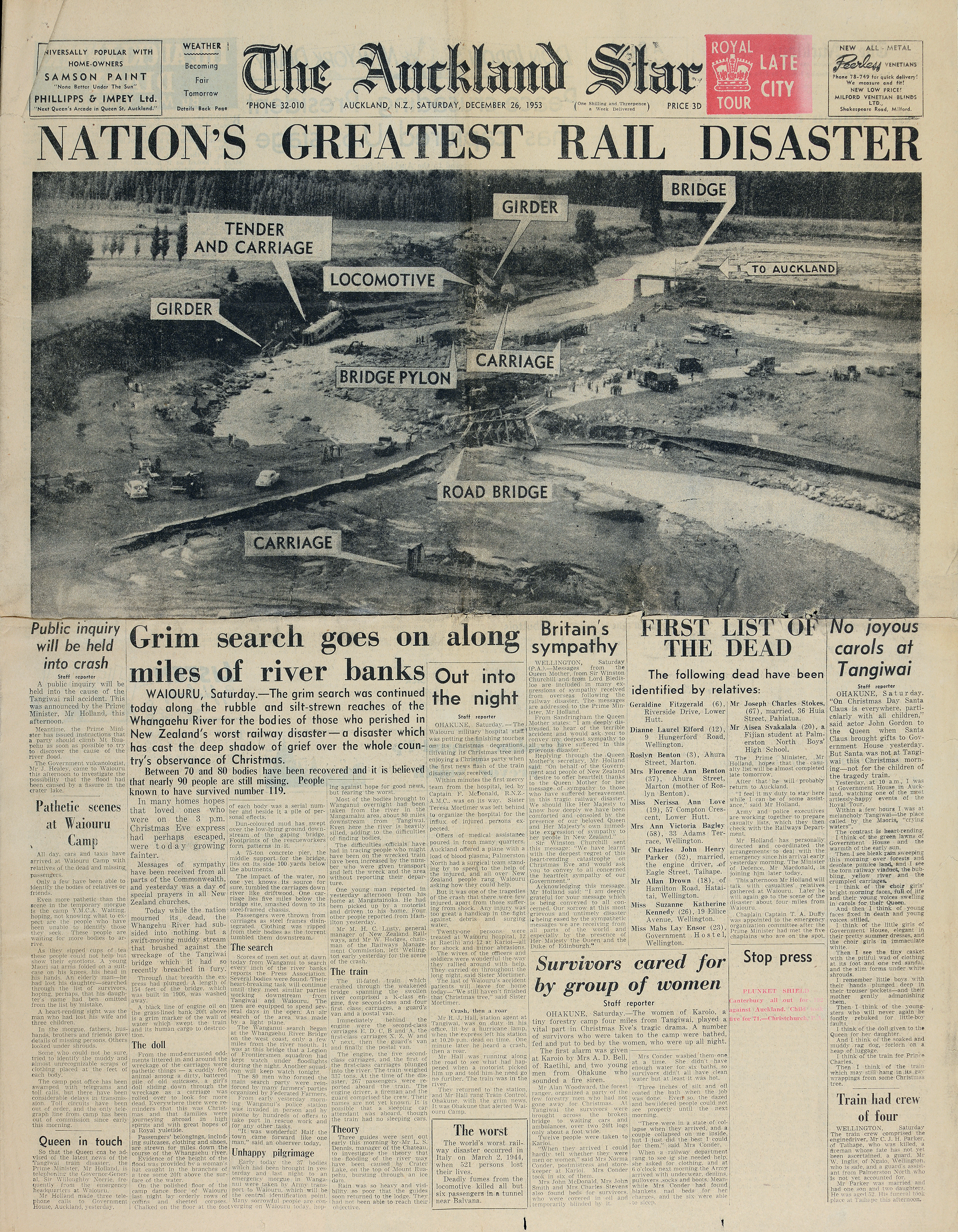
Front page of the Auckland Star newspaper of 26 December 1953

After the incident, Cyril Ellis informed the train's guard, William Inglis, of what had happened. The two entered the sixth carriage—which was then still balanced precariously on the bridge's edge—in an attempt to save the passengers. While they were in the carriage, it tumbled off the bridge and Ellis and Inglis, with the assistance of the passenger John Holman, smashed a window and helped the passengers out of the first-class carriage. Out of the carriage's 24 occupants only one died, a girl who was trapped in her seat and drowned.

Shortly after the accident, rescue teams departed from Waiouru 8 km (5 mi) east of Tangiwai. These included soldiers from Waiouru Army Camp, radio operators from Irirangi Naval Communications Station and workmen from the Waiouru Ministry of Works (MOW) camp. By midnight, the first survivors had been admitted into the Waiouru Camp Hospital, and by 4 a.m. the following day—Christmas morning—the first bodies had been transported to a makeshift mortuary at the camp.

Prince Philip, Duke of Edinburgh, Karori Cemetery, 31 December 1953

Prime Minister Sidney Holland arrived at Tangiwai early on Christmas morning after a high-speed drive down from Auckland. He coordinated the rescue work by railway, military, police, MOW, local farmers and undertakers. While the New Zealand Army led efforts near the accident site, local farmers recovered bodies further down the Whangaehu River; at Fields Track, Mount View, Mangamahu, Kauangaroa, Whangaehu village and the river mouth. The bodies were taken by truck to Wanganui and thence by rail to Waiouru, where police and undertakers identified them. Local people recovered 60 bodies from the Mangamāhū section of the river over the following few days, although 20 bodies were never recovered and are thought to have washed out to sea.

For their actions, Ellis and Holman received the George Medal in the 1954 New Zealand bravery awards. Inglis and a passing traveller, Arthur Dewar Bell, both received the British Empire Medal for actions that saved 15 lives. Queen Elizabeth II and the Duke of Edinburgh were visiting New Zealand on their first royal tour when the disaster occurred. The Queen made her Christmas broadcast from Auckland, finishing with a message of sympathy to the people of New Zealand. The Duke of Edinburgh attended a state funeral for many of the victims.

== Public inquiry ==
A board of inquiry was appointed to look into the cause of the accident; this sat in public from 26 January until 2 April and reported on 23 April 1954. The bridge had eight piers and seven spans. After the accident, four piers had been damaged and five spans dislodged. The board found that a lahar from Mount Ruapehu had removed the fourth pier a few minutes before the train started to cross the bridge. Their subsequent report stated:

"The relative positions of the 44 ft. girder (span 3) and the first car (A. 1907) dictate that the girder was removed before the passage of the first car. This girder must therefore have been removed either before the locomotive arrived on the span or during the passage of the locomotive and tender over the span. If this girder was removed during the passage of the locomotive, there is a strong inference that some part of the heavy structure of the locomotive would have hit girder No. 2. There was, however, no evidence of extensive damage to girder No. 2, and it may therefore be inferred that girder No. 3 was not removed during the passage of the locomotive across it. Span 3 was therefore carried away before the locomotive entered upon it and there was a strong inference that Pier No. 4 was carried away before the train passed over it. This would also cause span 4 to be carried away. There is also a strong inference that Pier 4 was removed by the lahar and that this caused the accident." The bridge had been designed for foreseeable flooding and for previous lahars that had different characteristics to the 1953 lahar, the forces of which had been unpredictable.

The official report had this to say about the facts as presented to it: "Much of the evidence submitted relating to the order of events at the crucial time of the destruction of the bridge and of the train and of the conditions about the bridge, including the bed of the river, rests on inferences on which the Board is asked to make findings of fact. It seems unavoidable that the reconstruction of some events and circumstances must rest on such a foundation..." The Board also stated, "...it is appropriate to record that in respect of every member of the train crew of train No. 626 and of every member of the Way and Works and Traffic Branches whose duties can be regarded as being involved in the accident there has been no failure to exercise reasonable care or fulfill any duty or responsibility reasonably to be expected of that member in the circumstances leading to the accident."

== Legacy ==
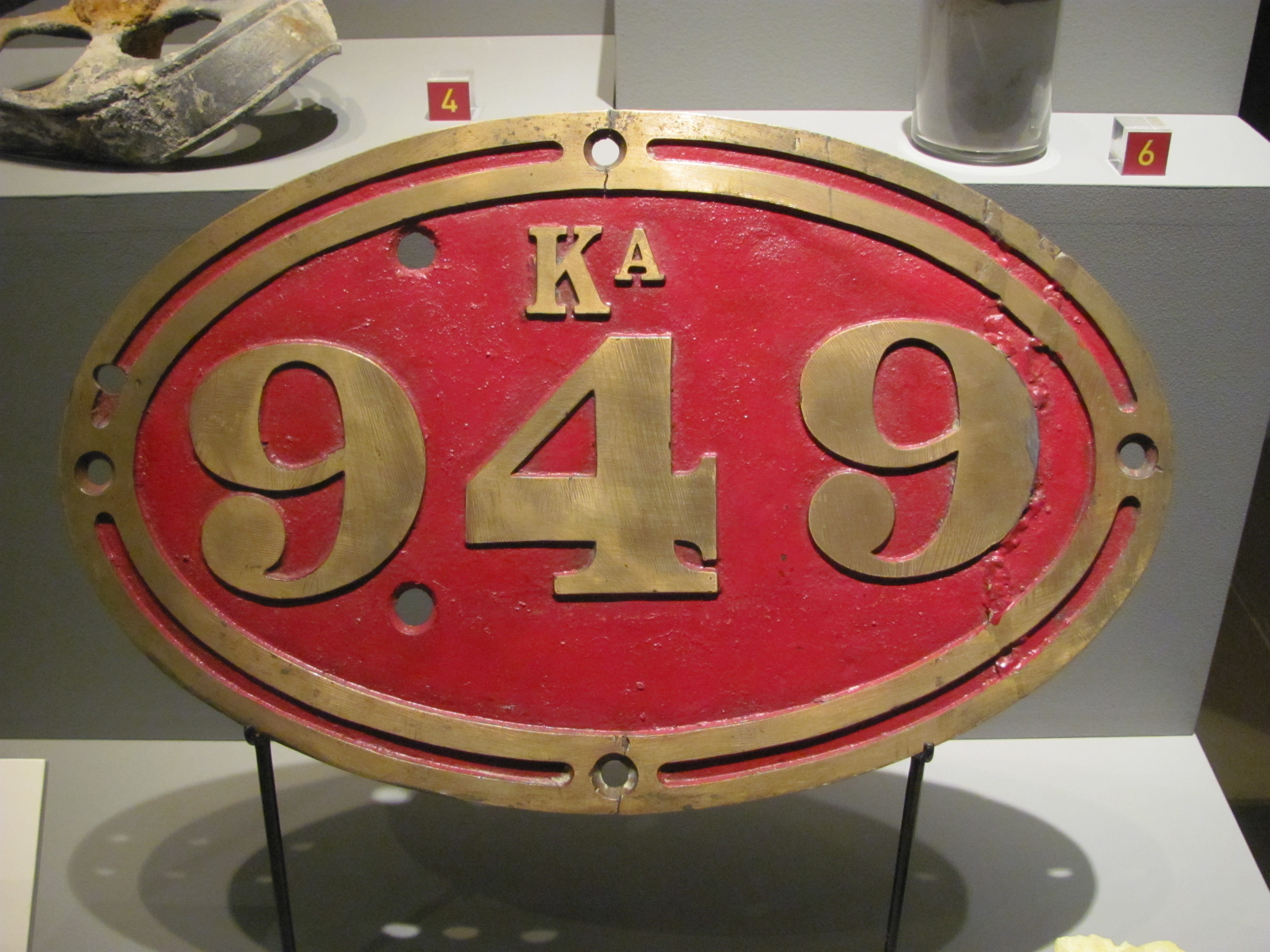
Number plate from K^{A} 949, on display in the Auckland War Memorial Museum

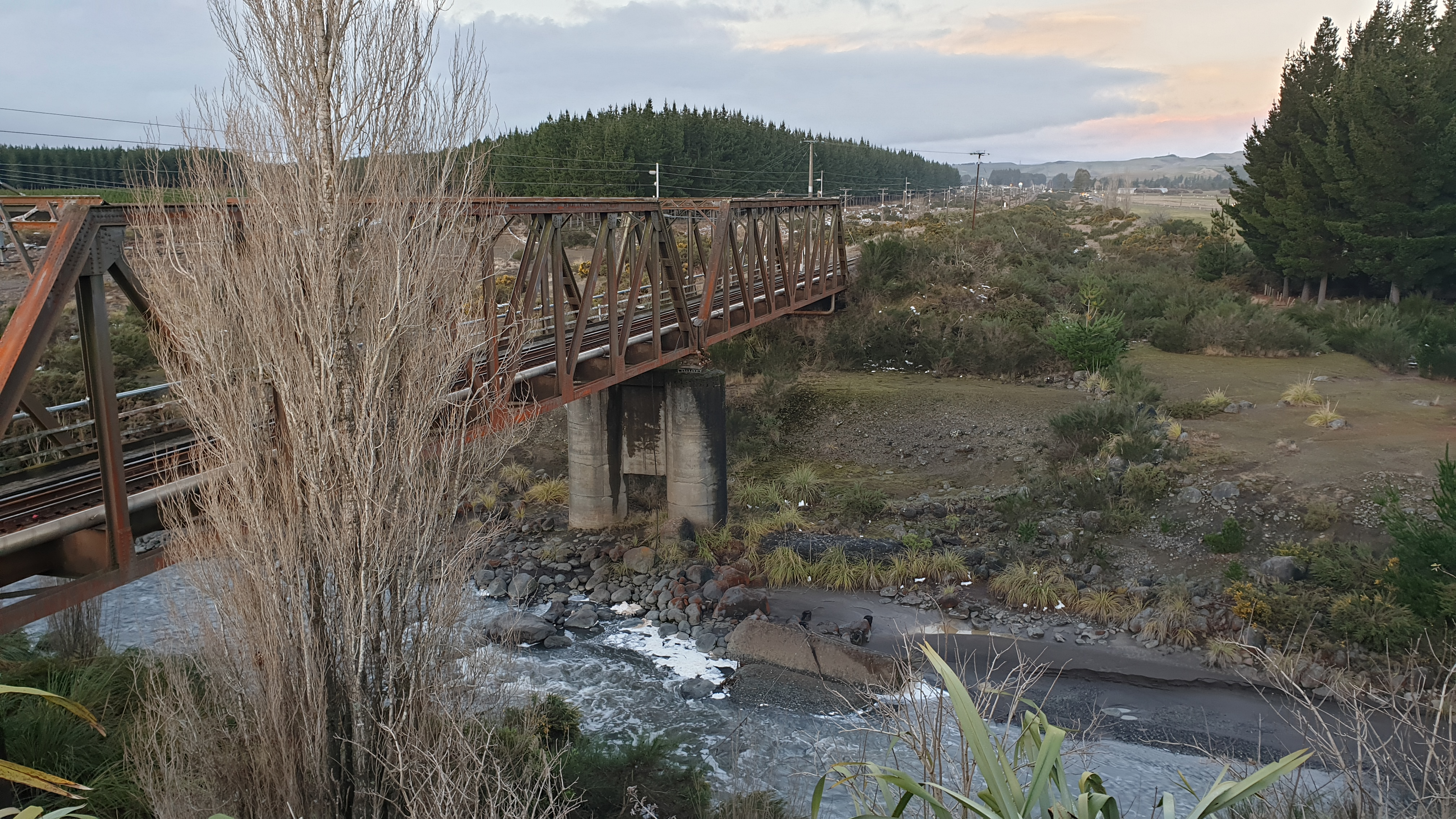
The site of the disaster as of July 2020. A concrete pier belonging to the bridge destroyed in the disaster remains visible

Following the disaster, the New Zealand Railways Department installed a lahar warning system upstream in the river to alert train control to high river flows. A new early warning system was installed in 1999 by Tranz Rail, which measures the river level using radar and sends the level to the Network Control Centre at Wellington railway station via an RF link to Waiouru, and then via the signalling network to Wellington. If the river changes level, an alarm is triggered, which alerts staff to the fact. If the level indicates a significant risk, the control centre sets the signals on either side of the Tangiwai bridge to danger and warns trains in the area to stay clear by radio. The system has a failsafe feature which automatically sends a fault signal to the control centre. In such a situation, trains in the area are restricted to 25 km/h (16 mph) and told to take extreme care over the Tangiwai bridge. Since 2002, it has also been backed up by the Eastern Ruapehu Lahar Alarm and Warning System (ERLAWS).

A lahar of similar magnitude to the one from 1953 occurred on 18 March 2007. The early warning systems worked as planned, stopping trains and motorists at Tangiwai before the lahar hit. The newer bridges held up to the lahar, and trains resumed operation after inspection.

In recognition of the disaster itself, and the effect that it had on the concurrent Test match between New Zealand and South Africa, since 2024 the Test cricket teams of New Zealand and South Africa play for the Tangiwai Shield.

=== Dramatisations ===
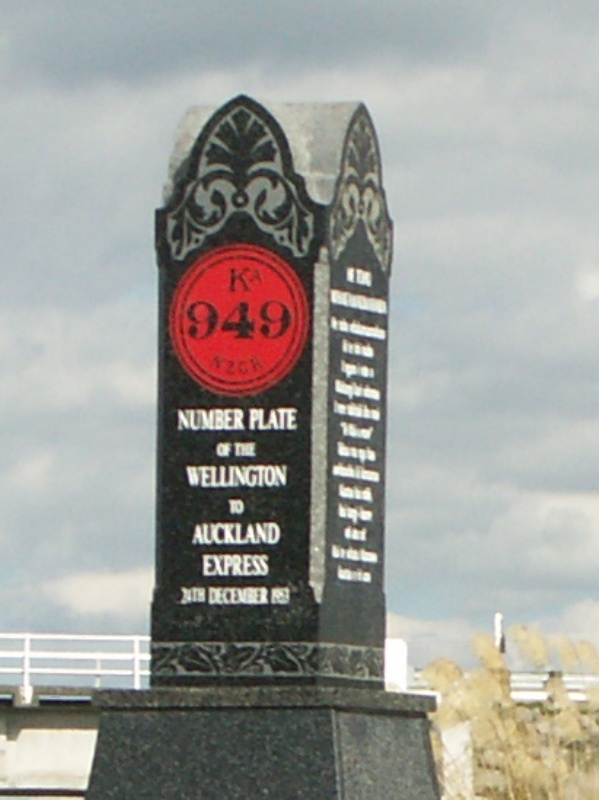
Tangiwai Memorial, showing the train engine number plate in 2006

In May 1993, the Television New Zealand Communicado co-produced Heroes television series had an episode covering the Tangiwai Disaster.

The 2002 documentary The Truth About Tangiwai, directed by New Zealand filmmaker David Sims, examines events surrounding the tragedy.

In 2011, a television film about the disaster was made by Lippy Pictures for Television New Zealand. Titled Tangiwai: A Love Story, it follows the disaster and the love story between Blair and Love (portrayed by Ryan O'Kane and Rose McIver respectively). It premiered on TV One on 14 August 2011. A play written and performed by Auckland actor Jonny Brugh, The Second Test, tells the same story from Blair's perspective, emphasising his commitment to continue playing after hearing of the tragedy.
