= Mangawhero River =

River in New Zealand

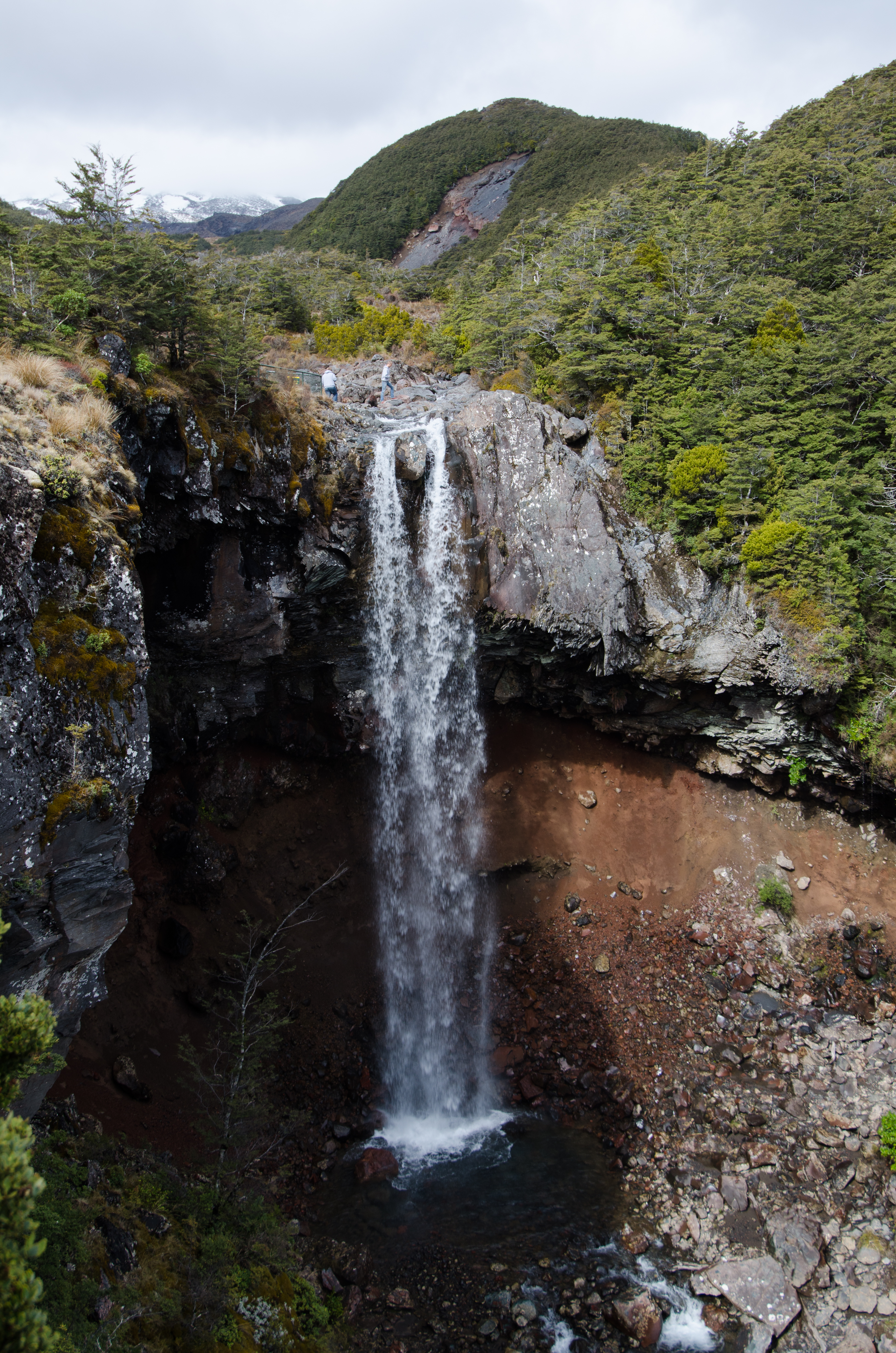
- The Mangawhero Falls on the Mangawhero River
- Etymology: Māori meaning "red stream"
- Native name: Mangawhero (Māori)

Location
- Country: New Zealand
- Region: Manawatū-Whanganui
- Towns: Ohakune

Physical characteristics
- Source: Mount Ruapehu
  - location: Tūroa skifield
  - coordinates: 39°18′4″S 175°32′13″E
  - elevation: 1,800 m (5,900 ft)
- Mouth: Whangaehu River
  - location: 7 km (4.3 mi) south-west of Mangamahu
  - coordinates: 39°51′30″S 175°17′55″E
  - elevation: 50 m (160 ft)
- Length: 130 kilometres (81 mi)

Basin features
- Progression: Mangawhero River → Whangaehu River
- River system: Whangaehu River
- Tributaries
  - right: Makotuku River
- Waterfalls: Mangawhero Falls, Raukawa Falls

The Mangawhero River is in the North Island of New Zealand. It drains the south-western slopes of Mount Ruapehu, passes through Ohakune before discharging into the Whangaehu River to the south-west of Mangamahu.

== History ==
The name Mangawhero means comes from the Māori word manga meaning "stream" and whero meaning "red". The river has been used for fishing, agricultural irrigation and domestic water supply. On 8 September 1979 up to 17,000 litres (4,500 US gal) of heating oil were split into the river from the Turoa ski field.

== Course ==
The source of the Mangawhero River is located on the slopes of Mt Ruapehu at elevation of approximately 1,800 m (5,900 ft). The river begins within the area of the Tūroa skifield and flows down the slopes of the mountain in a south west direction. The Ohakune Mountain Road, built during the 1950s and 60s, follows the river valley up to the skifield. The 25 m (82 ft) high Mangawhero Falls is located in this top section of the river and is accessible via a short walk from Ohakune Mountain Road.

The river continues to flow in a south west direction through the length of Ohakune. There are recreational areas in the town beside the river including walking and cycling trails. Ohakune's water supply is taken from a small tributary of the Mangawhero River, the Tutara (Serpentine) Stream. Treated wastewater from the Ohakune Wastewater Treatment Plant is discharged into the Mangawhero River. South west of Ohakune the river meanders across flat farmland for 10 km (6.2 mi). This area is a popular fishing spot for brown trout.

After crossing farmland the river enters a gorge and is joined by the tributary Makotuku River from the right 5 km (3.1 mi) south of Raetihi. The river then turns to flow more southwards as it meanders through farming hill country passing the settlements of Oreore and Kakatahi. The Parapara section of State Highway 4 follows the river valley for 40 km (25 mi) as it heads south, crossing the river four times. The Raukawa Falls are located on this stretch beside State Highway 4. The Raukawa Falls were 15 m (49 ft) high but the clay wall that the river flowed over collapse in the 2010s reducing the height and grandeur of the waterfall.

As the river continues south the meanders lengthen as the terrain flattens. The rivers terraces in the lower stretches of the river are often irrigated from the river. The Mangawhero River terminates where it meets the Whangaehu River 7 km (4.3 mi) south west of Mangamahu. The Whangaehu River continues southwards, eventually flowing into the Tasman Sea 12 km (7.5 mi) south east of Whanganui.

== In popular culture ==
The river was used as a filming location for the 2002 movie The Lord of the Rings: The Two Towers. A section of the river just above Mangawhero Falls was used for a scene where Gollum was fishing.
