= Whangaehu =

Settlement in the Rangitikei District of New Zealand's North Island

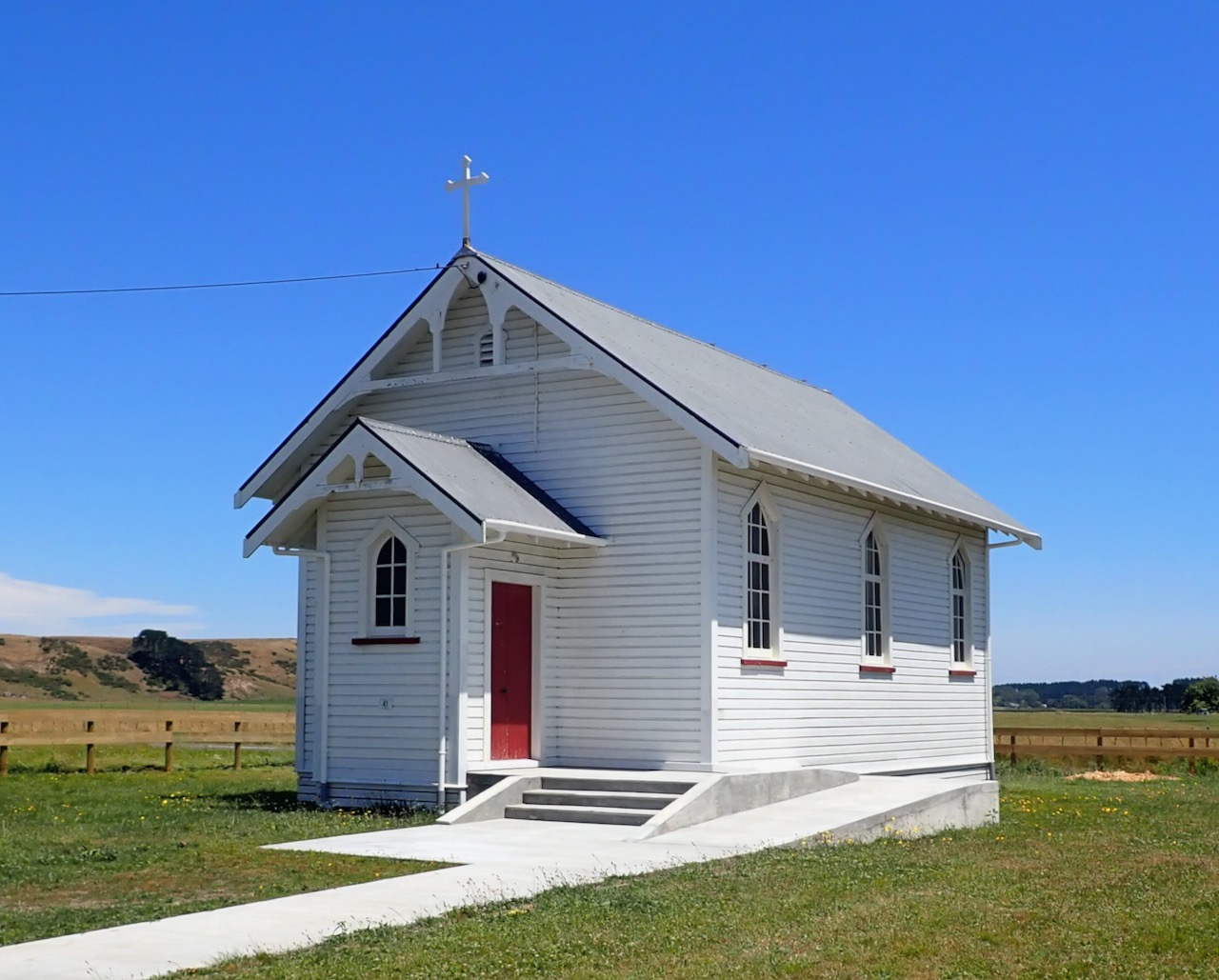
- St Andrew's Catholic Church, Whangaehu, moved to the present site in 2018
- Interactive map of Whangaehu
- Coordinates: 40.008°S 175.168°E
- Country: New Zealand
- Region: Manawatū-Whanganui
- District: Rangitikei District
- Wards: Southern General Ward; Tiikeitia ki Uta (Inland) Māori Ward
- Electorates: Rangitīkei; Te Tai Hauāuru (Māori)

Government
  - Territorial Authority: Rangitikei District Council
  - Regional council: Horizons Regional Council
  - Mayor of Rangitikei: Andy Watson
  - Rangitīkei MP: Suze Redmayne
  - Te Tai Hauāuru MP: Debbie Ngarewa-Packer

Area
  - Total: 43.70 km^{2} (16.87 sq mi)

Population (2023 Census)
  - Total: 165
  - Density: 3.78/km^{2} (9.78/sq mi)

Whangaehu is a settlement in the Rangitikei District and Manawatū-Whanganui region of New Zealand's North Island.

Whangaehu is located near the mouth of the Whangaehu River, a large river flowing for 135 kilometres (84 mi) from the crater lake of Mount Ruapehu on the central plateau, southward to the South Taranaki Bight in the Tasman Sea. Water is diverted from the headwaters for the Tongariro Power Scheme.

== History ==
Whangaehu was the site of a Māori settlement when Europeans began settling the nearby Whanganui River mouth at Whanganui in the mid-19th century. Nicholas Chevalier depicted the settlement in a sketch in December 1868, which is now in the Museum of New Zealand Te Papa Tongarewa.

Mount Ruapehu has erupted multiple times, causing sludge to flow down the river. In February 1862 James Coutts Crawford was given several old songs and various accounts of the taniwha in the river. Flooding was recorded following the 1889 and 1895 eruptions.

The sudden collapse of part of the Ruapehu crater wall on 24 December 1953 led to New Zealand's worst railway accident, the Tangiwai disaster. A lahar – a sudden surge of mud-laden water – swept down the river.

On 18 March 2007, the mountain crater lake burst, sending an estimated 1.29 billion cubic metres of water, mud, and sludge down the river. The lahar was 50% bigger than the 1953 Lahar that caused the Tangiwai disaster, but the Ruapehu ERLAWS alarm was successfully activated preventing any accidents.

== Demographics ==
Whangaehu locality covers 43.70 km^{2} (16.87 sq mi). It surrounds but does not include Rātana Pā. It is part of the larger Turakina statistical area.

Historical population
Year	Pop.	±% p.a.
2013	144	—
2018	156	+1.61%
2023	165	+1.13%

Whangaehu had a population of 165 in the 2023 New Zealand census, an increase of 9 people (5.8%) since the 2018 census, and an increase of 21 people (14.6%) since the 2013 census. There were 84 males and 81 females in 54 dwellings. The median age was 33.8 years (compared with 38.1 years nationally). There were 39 people (23.6%) aged under 15 years, 33 (20.0%) aged 15 to 29, 69 (41.8%) aged 30 to 64, and 24 (14.5%) aged 65 or older.

People could identify as more than one ethnicity. The results were 67.3% European (Pākehā); 45.5% Māori; 5.5% Pasifika; 5.5% Asian; and 1.8% Middle Eastern, Latin American and African New Zealanders (MELAA). English was spoken by 96.4%, Māori by 14.5%, Samoan by 1.8%, and other languages by 5.5%. No language could be spoken by 1.8% (e.g. too young to talk). The percentage of people born overseas was 9.1, compared with 28.8% nationally.

Religious affiliations were 30.9% Christian, and 16.4% Māori religious beliefs. People who answered that they had no religion were 47.3%, and 5.5% of people did not answer the census question.

Of those at least 15 years old, 18 (14.3%) people had a bachelor's or higher degree, 81 (64.3%) had a post-high school certificate or diploma, and 30 (23.8%) people exclusively held high school qualifications. The median income was $38,900, compared with $41,500 nationally. 15 people (11.9%) earned over $100,000 compared to 12.1% nationally. The employment status of those at least 15 was 69 (54.8%) full-time, 18 (14.3%) part-time, and 6 (4.8%) unemployed.

== Education ==
Whangaehu School is a co-educational state primary school for Year 1 to 8 students, with a roll of 17 as of July 2026. It opened in 1872, and moved to the current site in 1915.

== Notable people ==
- Vida Mary Katie MacLean (1881–1970), civilian and military nurse, hospital matron
- Dame Tariana Turia
