= 1980 New Zealand bravery awards =

The 1980 New Zealand bravery awards were announced via a Special Honours List on 23 December 1980, and recognised five people for acts of bravery in 1979 or 1980.

== Queen's Commendation for Brave Conduct ==
- Ronald Samson Lenz – senior traffic sergeant, Traffic Enforcement, Ministry of Transport, Christchurch.

For services on the evening of 18 October 1979, when he was confronted by a disturbed man armed with a shotgun. The man had threatened him and other persons. Had it not been for Senior Traffic Sergeant Lenz's coolness and courage there could have been loss of life.

- Driver David Ian White – lately Royal New Zealand Corps of Transport, 2nd Composite Squadron, Fort Dorset.

For rescuing from drowning the driver of a motor vehicle, in which he was a passenger, after it had gone out of control and plunged some 50 metres into the Mangawhero River. His prompt action without doubt saved the life of the driver.

- Herbert Ernest Wash – superintendent, Wi Tako Prison.
- Hemi Te Muranui Anderson – prison officer, Wi Tako Prison.
- John Weston Kirton – second officer, Prison Staff College.

For services on the evening of 21 January 1980, when fighting erupted between two rival groups of inmates, some 40 in number, who had armed themselves with sticks, iron bars and other makeshift weapons. Superintendent Wash, Prison Officer Anderson and Second Officer Kirton displayed considerable courage in dealing with a dangerous and difficult situation.
