= Bob Blair (cricketer) =

New Zealand cricketer (1932–2026)

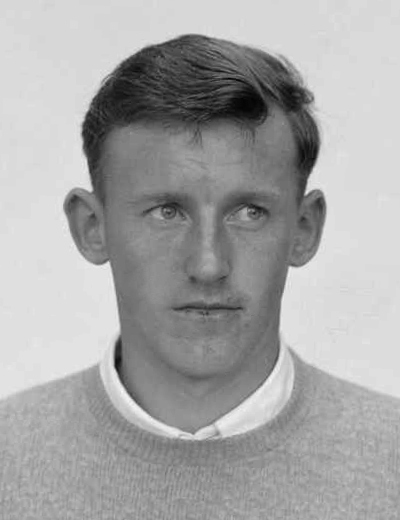
- Blair in 1956

Personal information
- Full name: Robert William Blair
- Born: 23 June 1932; Petone, New Zealand
- Died: 23 June 2026 (aged 94); England
- Batting: Right-handed
- Bowling: Right-arm fast-medium

International information
- National side: New Zealand
- Test debut: 6 March 1953 v South Africa
- Last Test: 13 March 1964 v South Africa

Career statistics
Competition	Test	First-class
Matches	19	119
Runs scored	189	1,672
Batting average	6.75	12.29
100s/50s	0/1	0/3
Top score	64*	79
Balls bowled	3,525	25,282
Wickets	43	537
Bowling average	35.23	18.54
5 wickets in innings	0	41
10 wickets in match	0	12
Best bowling	4/85	9/72
Catches/stumpings	5/–	46/–
- Source: CricInfo, 3 December 2020

Robert William Blair (23 June 1932 – 23 June 2026) was a New Zealand cricketer who played 19 Test matches for national team.

== Cricket career ==
Blair was a fast bowler who was never quite able to carry his enormous success for Wellington in the Plunket Shield over into the Test arena. In 59 matches for Wellington from 1951–52 to 1964–65 he took 330 wickets at an average of 15.16. In his best season, he took 46 wickets in the five matches of 1956–57 at an average of 9.47, twice taking nine wickets in an innings. The next season, he took 34 at 11.20, then in a trial match at the end of the season he took five wickets in each innings for North Island against South Island. But in the series that followed a few months later in England, he took only three wickets in three Tests, at an average of 70. He achieved his best Test match figures, 7 for 142, in what turned out to be his last Test, against South Africa at Auckland in 1963–64.

He holds the record for the lowest career batting average by a Test player who scored a 50 in an innings, with 6.75. His only 50 came in the first innings of the Second Test against England at Wellington in 1962–63, when he came to the wicket with the score at 96 for 7 and hit 64 not out, the top score of the innings, putting on 44 for the last wicket with Frank Cameron to take the final total to 194.

In the mid-1980s, Blair joined Widnes Cricket Club, who were then part of the Manchester and District Cricket Association, as a coach. In the late 1990s, Blair was coach of the Zimbabwe domestic first class team Matabeleland that competed for the Logan Cup. He then returned for a second spell with Widnes, who had by that time joined the Cheshire County Cricket League.

== Blair and the Tangiwai disaster ==
In December 1953, Blair, playing for New Zealand against South Africa at Johannesburg, received news that his fiancée, Nerissa Love, had been killed in the Tangiwai railway disaster on Christmas Eve. Blair was not expected to bat when his turn came on Boxing Day, as an announcement had been made that he would take no further part in the game. In the event, however, he appeared at the crease at the fall of the ninth wicket to join Bert Sutcliffe, who had already started to walk off the field. The packed crowd stood in silence. The two men added 33 for the last wicket in 20 balls, with Sutcliffe striking Hugh Tayfield for three sixes and Blair one from a single eight-ball over, but in Tayfield's next over Blair was stumped, bringing New Zealand's first innings to an end. South Africa went on to win the match by 132 runs.

A book about the incident, What Are You Doing Out Here: Heroism and Distress at a Cricket Test by Norman Harris, was published in 2010. Blair wrote the foreword.

In 2011, a television film about the disaster, Tangiwai: A Love Story, was made by Lippy Pictures for Television New Zealand, focusing on the love story of Bob Blair and his fiancée Nerissa Love. Blair was portrayed by actor Ryan O'Kane and Nerissa Love by Rose McIver. It premiered on TV One on 14 August 2011. It has since been released on DVD.

A play written and performed by Auckland actor Jonny Brugh, The Second Test, tells the story from Blair's perspective, emphasizing his commitment to continue playing with the New Zealand team.

== Personal life and death ==
In 1986, 33 years after the Tangiwai disaster, Blair married his wife Barbara. The couple lived in England, where Blair died on 23 June 2026, his 94th birthday.
