= Tangiwai: A Love Story =

- Written by: Paula Boock; Donna Malane
- Directed by: Charlie Haskell
- Starring: Ryan O'Kane; Rose McIver
- Music by: Peter Hobbs
- Country of origin: New Zealand
- Original language: English

Production
- Producers: Paula Boock; Donna Malane
- Cinematography: David Paul
- Editor: Paul Sutorius
- Running time: 93 minutes

Original release
- Release: 14 August 2011

Tangiwai: A Love Story, a.k.a. Tangiwai, is a 2011 New Zealand television film. Set around the Tangiwai disaster it tells a love story of cricketer Bob Blair and his fiance Nerissa Love, who died in the disaster. Blair was in South Africa for a test and learnt of her death the night before the game but still famously went out to bat when New Zealands innings was falling apart. It featured Ryan O'Kane as Blair and Rose McIver as Love.

The train disaster was filmed in Mākara with a one-sixth scale model train created by Weta Workshop.

Writing in the New Zealand Herald Isaac Davison notes that the makers took a lot of poetic licence in the story, adding extra tension and drama to the couples story. Blair himself says "It's a story, not a documentary. But some of it is totally different from what actually happened."

== Cast ==
- Rose McIver as Nerissa Love
- Ryan O'Kane as Bob Blair
- Miranda Harcourt as Mabel Love
- Mick Rose as Alec Love
- Taungaroa Emile as Toki Awa
- Dean O'Gorman as Bert Sutcliffe
- Catherine Wilkin as Emma Blair
- Peter McCauley as Bill Blair
- Nathan Meister as Jim Blair
- Iain O'Brien as Neil Adcock

== Reception ==
Linda Burgess in Wellington's the Post said "Young love may be hard to portray without going down the sentimental path but this drama shone with its depiction of social mores in New Zealand in the repressed and repressive 1950s, most particularly with the portrayal of Catholic girl marrying Protestant boy." She wrote of the finale "What a Chariots of Fire ending - the writers were able to portray an indomitable, deeply anguished Blair going out to hit a six. Not a dry eye in the house, and I'm betting there won't be one single person who doesn't think that this time, NZ on Air spent its money wisely." Malcolm Hopwood of the Manawatu Standard wrote "Great relationships played out in a world in turmoil is the stuff of history. The Tangiwai writers took this 'stuff of history' and told a simple love story between a Catholic girl and a Protestant boy" adding "In all, it was a fine effort and money well spent by New Zealand On Air." Tim Roxborogh was critical of some of the liberties taken in the telling of the story, saying "the odd thing about Tangiwai was the omission of more interesting fact for less interesting fiction."

== Awards ==
2012 New Zealand Television Awards

- Best Performance by a Supporting Actor - Mick Rose - won
- Cinematography - David Paul - won
- Production Design - John Harding - won
- Make-Up Design - Linda Wall - won
- Supporting Actress - Miranda Harcourt - nominated
- Costume Design - nominated
