= Wahianoa River =

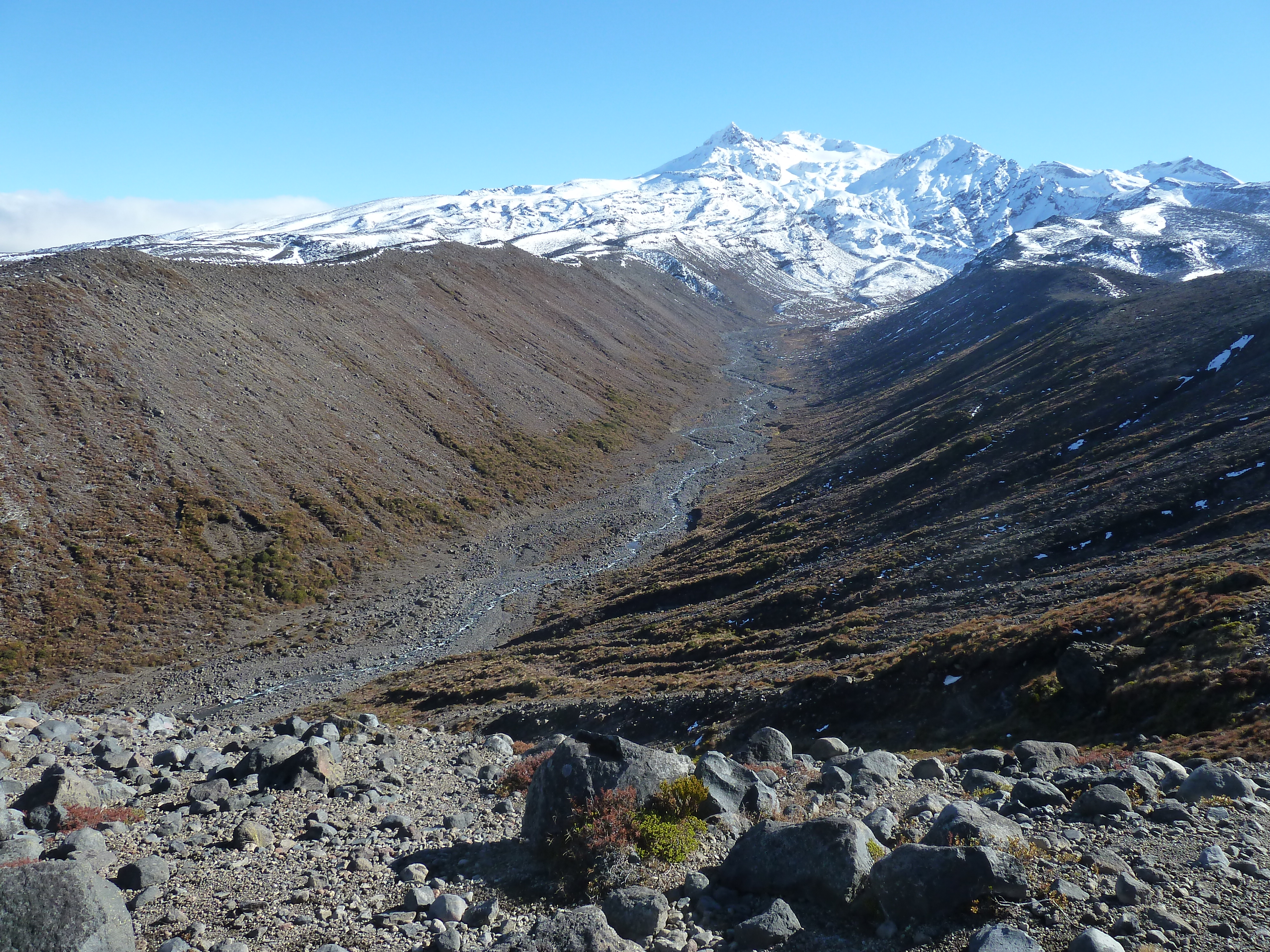
- Native name: Wahianoa (Māori)

Location
- Country: New Zealand
- Region: Manawatū-Whanganui
- District: Ruapehu District

Physical characteristics
- Source: Wahianoa Glacier
  - location: Mount Ruapehu
  - coordinates: 39°17′42″S 175°34′34″E
  - elevation: 2,300 m (7,500 ft)
- Mouth: Whangaehu River
  - coordinates: 39.442892°S 175.626397°E
  - elevation: 740 m (2,430 ft)
- Length: 21 km (13 mi)

Basin features
- Progression: Wahianoa River → Whangaehu River
- River system: Whangaehu River

The Wahianoa River is a river of the Manawatū-Whanganui region of New Zealand's North Island. One of the headwaters of the Whangaehu River, it flows southeast from the southern slopes of Mount Ruapehu, gradually veering southwest before meeting the Whangaehu 3 kilometres (2 mi) northwest of Waiouru.

== See also ==
- List of rivers of New Zealand
