= Eastern Ruapehu Lahar Alarm and Warning System =

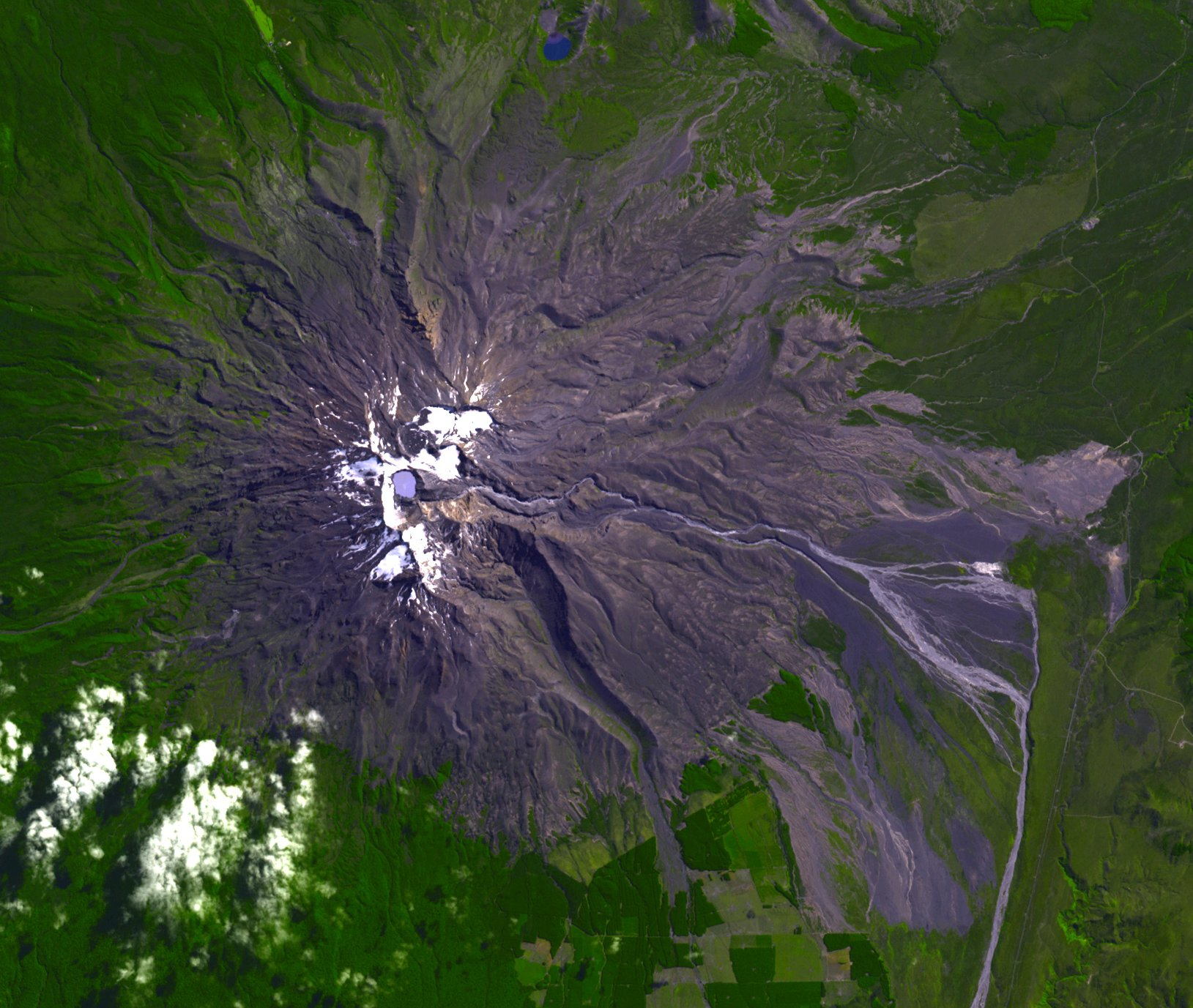
Fresh lahar channels are visible on Ruapehu's eastern slopes, 27 March 2007.

The Eastern Ruapehu Lahar Alarm and Warning System (ERLAWS) is a lahar warning system that was installed on Mount Ruapehu, New Zealand following volcanic eruptions in 1995–1996. The system successfully detected and warned of an imminent lahar in March 2007. The system is being expanded to detect the wider range of lahar threats now expected on Ruapehu.

== Introduction ==
The 1995–1996 eruptions of Ruapehu in the North Island of New Zealand left a 7-metre high dam of tephra, consisting of volcanic ash and rock, around the rim of the crater lake. It was realised that as the lake refilled and rose above the level of its normal outlet, the tephra dam would eventually collapse, causing a large lahar. Such a lahar resulted in the 1953 Tangiwai disaster when 151 people died as the lahar swept a railway bridge away, causing a passenger train to plunge into the Whangaehu River. In 2000 the government decided to plan, design and implement ERLAWS – a complex system of sensors and preventative mechanisms to warn of an impending lahar. The system began operating in 2002.

== Sensors ==
ERLAWS consists of three sites at which various sensors are located – these are:

- Site 1 (Crater Lake outlet)
  - three geophones to detect the vibration of the collapse and from lahars
  - a buried tripwire to detect collapse of the dam
  - water level sensors to detect a sudden drop in lake level
- Site 2 (NZ Alpine Club hut)
  - two geophones to detect the vibration from passing lahars
- Site 3 (near Tukino skifield)
  - two geophones to detect the vibration from passing lahars.

== Monitoring ==
Signals from the sites are transmitted to the Genesis Energy power station at Tokaanu, where computers monitor the data received and upload it to an external server and the ERLAWS website. When incoming measurements meet or exceed pre-set thresholds, alarms are sent via pagers to police, district council staff, Transit New Zealand, KiwiRail Network staff, and duty scientists who will then respond following predetermined plans. This alert can be up to two hours before a lahar would reach Tangiwai.

== Transit systems ==
Transit New Zealand has systems installed on the State Highways surrounding the area, which alert motorists and in some cases prevent entry to the danger areas. These systems incorporate automatic barrier gates, flashing lights and electronic signs warning of flash flooding.

== Events ==
On 18 March 2007, the tephra dam collapsed, causing a lahar which flowed down the mountain and into the Whangaehu River. The ERLAWS system activated at 10:47am and worked as planned. Scientists estimate that 1.29 million cubic metres (1.29 billion litres) of sulphur and water went down the Whangaehu Valley, leaving 8.9 million cubic metres in the crater lake. This lahar was at least 50% larger than the 1953 lahar that caused the Tangiwai disaster.

== Expansion ==
Following the 2007 lahar, the risks of future lahars were reassessed and judged to affect more valleys than before. The ERLAWS system will be broadened in response to the wider threat.
