= Mangamahu =

- Hamlet
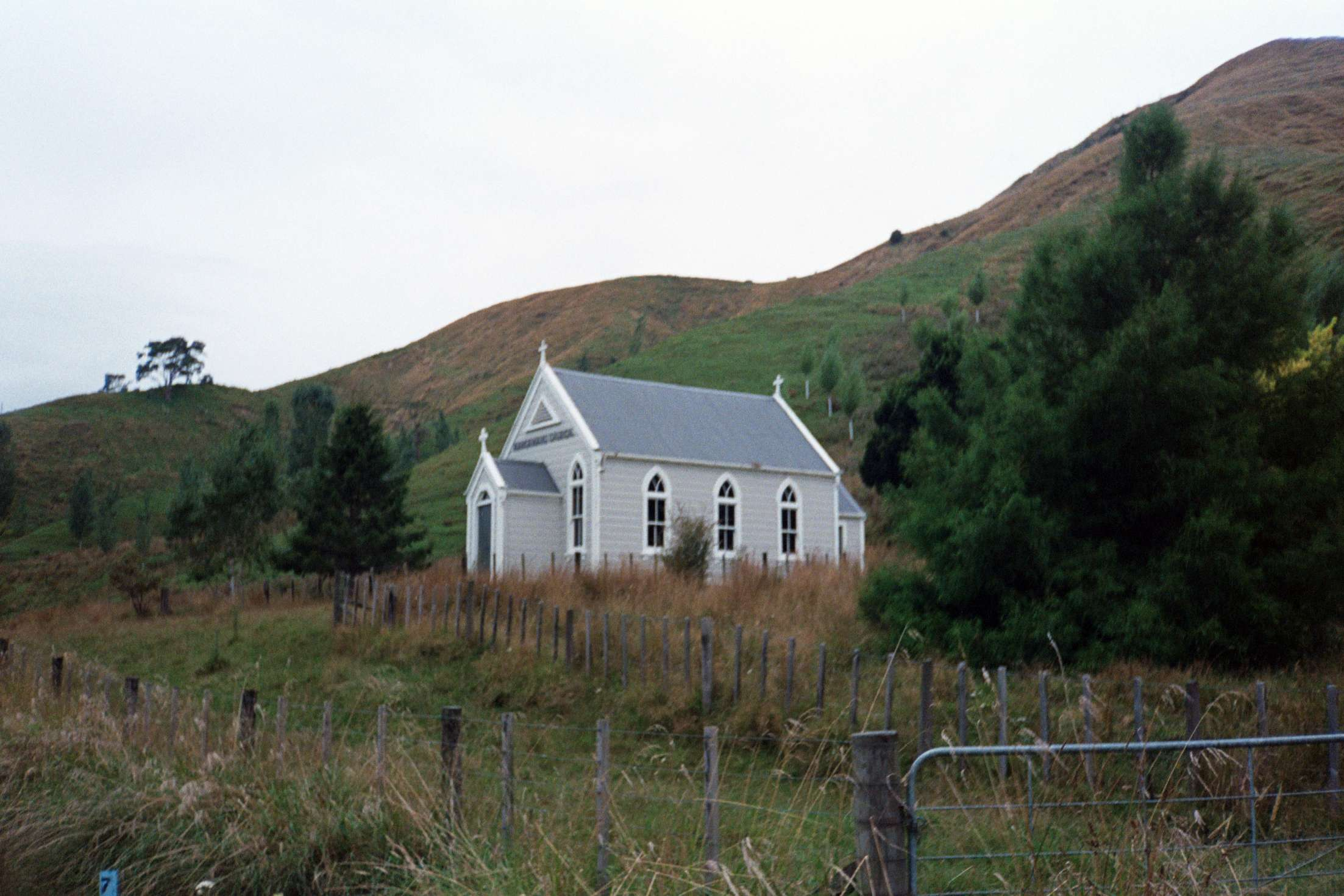
- Mangamahu Church, pictured in 2023
- Interactive map of Mangamahu
- Coordinates: 39°49′0″S 175°22′0″E
- Country: New Zealand
- Region: Manawatū-Whanganui
- District: Whanganui District
- Community: Whanganui Rural Community
- Electorates: Whanganui; Te Tai Hauāuru (Māori)

Government
  - Territorial Authority: Whanganui District Council
  - Regional council: Horizons Regional Council
  - Mayor of Whanganui: Andrew Tripe
  - Whanganui MP: Carl Bates
  - Te Tai Hauāuru MP: Debbie Ngarewa-Packer

Area
  - Total: 83.78 km^{2} (32.35 sq mi)

Population (2023 Census)
  - Total: 93
  - Density: 1.1/km^{2} (2.9/sq mi)

Mangamahu is a hill-country farming and forestry community in the middle reaches of the Whangaehu River valley, in the Whanganui District and Rangitikei District of Manawatū-Whanganui, New Zealand. It is centred on the village of Mangamahu, which is situated on river flats where the Mangamahu stream flows into the Whangaehu river. Mangamahu has a primary school (5 - 10 children) which has been open since 1894 and a War Memorial Hall built in 1952.

The hotel and the general store at Mangamahu closed in the early 1970s due to improved roads, and a decline in wool and meat prices. Farmland on poorer hill soils at the lower end of the valley then began a conversion to pine plantations.

The New Zealand Ministry for Culture and Heritage gives a translation of "gentle stream" for Mangamahu.

== History ==
=== Pre-European history ===
The Mangamahu river flats were formed by huge mud slides or "lahars" (c. 1200 and 1520 AD) flowing down the Whangaehu river from the crater lake of Mount Ruapehu.

The river flat on which Mangamahu School is situated is the site of an old Ngati Apa Maori camp-site named Kohanga. This was occupied in summer by bird-snaring and eel-trapping groups from further down the Whangaehu, and also used as a way station by those travelling the trail up the ridge between the Whangaehu river and Mangamahu stream, from the fortified pa at Manumanu (near the mouth of the Mangawhero river) to Karioi, and then across the Rangipo Desert and Lake Taupo to the Waikato and Rotorua.

Kohanga and Manumanu were destroyed during the musket wars in 1840 and 1843, and most of the surviving inhabitants of the upper valley moved west to Parikino on the Whanganui River.

=== European settlement ===
British colonists began buying the land in the 1870s. James MacDonald was the first white settler, introducing sheep to his clearing in the bush at 'Glenaladale' in 1872. His wife joined him there in 1875.

During the 1880s the old Maori trail through Mangamahu was developed into a bench track for pack horses (Hales Track). It followed the Whangaehu river flats to the Mangamahu Stream, then went up the northern ridgeline of the Mangamahu Stream to Bald Hill, and on to Karioi. It gave settlers access to the nearer forest-covered hills of the area, (now Ruakiwi, Inzevar, Aranui and Mt View farms) and enabled packhorses to bring wool from sheep grazing on the high back-country tussock lands at Ngamatea and Waiouru. From Waiouru the trail went on to Moawhango and then to Napier.

In 1879 Arthur Ellis and Allan Robinson bought 140 hectares on the site of the present Mangamahu village. To assist the many settlers and labourers moving up and down Hales Track, they developed a supply store to which a post office was attached in 1889. Then in 1891 they built an accommodation house, and by 1894 this was a licensed 12-bedroom hotel. A blacksmith's shop and saddlery were added and served customers as far away as Taihape and Raetihi.

In 1891, work began on widening Hales Track into a wagon road, The Ridge Road. From 1894 to 1908, Mangamahu village was a busy district supply centre with wagons moving up the Ridge Road to farms and railway construction sites in the central high country as far away as Ngamatapouri and the Waimarino, and with travellers going across the island from Wanganui to Napier.

The tracks and roads in the hills behind the village were still very difficult to negotiate and Royal Mail contractor Annie Shaw (Barb Wire Annie) became a well known for her grit in getting her pack-horses delivering the mail across the hills in the winter mud from 1904 to 1910.

Then in 1908 the Main Trunk Railway line through the centre of the island was completed and Mangamahu's importance as a transport hub greatly shrunk. The Ridge Road was closed in 1922. Access to Ruakiwi, Inzevar, Aranui and Mt View farms was changed to the new "River Road" that had been cut out of the steep papa bluffs to follow the river. It is now known as the Upper Whangaehu Valley Road. Farm houses and woolsheds up on the cold windy ridges were dismantled and rebuilt down by the river. The macrocarpa tree shelter belts around the old farm houses are now significant landmarks.

=== 20th century ===
Merv Addenbrooke was born at Mangamahu in 1901. He worked as a bushman, fencer and shearer on local farms there until 1930. Merv's 1991 autobiography Home from the Hill (in NZ public libraries and also online) has detailed anecdotes about his childhood and farm-working days in Mangamahu between 1905 and 1930. In 1930 Merv married and moved to a dairy farm at Putaruru. He died in 1993.

By 1945, Mangamahu village had a school (with 12 pupils), general store/post office, a hotel, a bus and taxi service, a general carrier and a timber mill. In the surrounding district there were farmers, shepherds, fencers, roadmen, bridge builders, itinerant shearers and scrub-cutters. In the 1940s, most of the scrub-cutters were middle-aged Catholic men who could not get a divorce, and who wanted to disappear from sight. But by 1948, the first Fijian Indians scrub-cutters had arrived.

The dusty corrugated gravel road to Wanganui was a boneshaking one-hour journey, while the River Road, from Mangamahu to Mount View, was narrow and winding with steep bluffs and many slips in winter. Not many people had cars, and gathering at the Mangamahu store each evening at 5pm to meet Tommy Thompson's bus was an important social gathering.

There were many sporting activities, especially rugby, golf and pony club, but also tennis, cricket and badminton. The rifle shooting club that had flourished in the 1920s and 1930s had died out, but pig hunting was still popular.

The Tangiwai disaster greatly affected Mangamahu during the Christmas week of 1953. A lahar down the Whangaehu river from the Mt Ruapehu crater lake reached Mangamahu at 7am on Christmas morning. Wreckage of a passenger train and dozens of bodies were in the muddy flow. Over the next four weeks, local settlers recovered the bodies of about sixty victims from out of the river gorges near Mangamahu.

In 1951 the first topdressing planes arrived, spreading super-phosphate to make more grass grow on the steep hills of the sheep-farms. Not much fertilizer at first, but by 1960 the local carrier was carting 2000 tonne a year to the various airstrips in the district. The topdressing enabled much more wool and sheep-meat to be produced, and Mangamahu bard John Archer describes the unexpected social consequences.

The valley grew so wealthy,
from the super-pilots' loads
The farmers all bought big new motor cars,
and they tar-sealed our back-country roads.
The farmers' wives drove out every day,
to the big bright shops in town -
And the Mangamahu store went bankrupt,
the Mangamahu pub closed down.

In 1973 the price of oil skyrocketed, and this was followed by a reform government that abolished farm subsidies that had encouraged farmers to produce more than the market could absorb. Sheep farming became uneconomic on the more marginal dissected slip-prone hills in the middle of the valley, and "Queen Street farmers", investors from Auckland, bought up thousands of hectares to plant pine plantations. The pine trees greatly reduced erosion of the soft soil forming the steep hills in the Mangamahu valleys.

Massey University lecturer Paul Kaplan headed a team of six researchers who interviewed nearly every adult in Mangamahu to find out how social conditions affected farm production. Two findings of his made the national news. He discovered that when Mangamahu farmers reached their early fifties, many did things like upgrading their farmhouse kitchens, while decreasing active involvement in managing their farms, instead of getting out onto the hills and increasing production.

So to maintain productivity, said Kaplan, the farmer's oldest son ideally needed to take over management of the family farm ideally in their 20s or early 30s (many of the young women had left the valley and usually did not inherit, or were involved in the management of the family farm). The farmer could then trust his son with 'the chequebook,' and the energetic young man would spend the winter on the hill-tops improving the land.

The 1989 comedy Came a Hot Friday, about two 1949 con-men, had some woolshed and river scenes filmed at Mangamahu. A suspension bridge was specially built over the Whangaehu River at Tokorangi farm for a car crash at the end of the film.

In 1991 Murray George Rabel undertook an economic study of "The Impact on Farmers of Changes in Rural Servicing Infrastructure".

=== 21st century ===
After the downturn in 1973, former sheep paddocks began to be planted in pines, and a corresponding decline in the output of fat lambs, wethers, wool and cattle from the valley. By the 1990s, huge numbers of pine trees had been planted. Consequently, there were fewer heavy truck-and-trailer journeys on the valley roads, and road-maintenance costs were low. But Pinus radiata takes only 25 years to grow to a loggable size in New Zealand, and by 2009 thousands of tonnes of pine awaited removal on the valley's sub-standard roads.

On 28 June 2013, the Wanganui Chronicle reported that Wyley's Bridge, the main access to Mangamahu, needed urgent repairs so trucks could keep using it until a new bridge was built. Inferior timber had been used when the wood and wire-rope suspension bridge was built in 1957, and the bridge transoms were now rotting.

Andy Collins, a leading farmer at Mangamahu, stated that 15 to 20 million dollars of agricultural product were produced in the valley each year. This consisted of nearly 5000 cattle, more than 100,000 sheep, 500 tonne of wool, 600 tonne of kiwifruit, 1000 tonne of maize and a small number of deer. An average of 2000 tonne of fertilizer was carried into the valley each year.

Repairs were started on the bridge a week later, and then construction started on a new 'coat-hanger' bridge that was opened in mid-2015.

In 2016 Lilburn's Mangamahu experiences provoked her to document the challenges and possibilities faced by those who remained in place as they aged.

The Welcome to Nowhere music festival was held in the area between 2017 and 2024.

== Demographics ==
Mangamahu locality covers 83.78 km^{2} (32.35 sq mi). It is part of the larger Upper Whanganui statistical area.

Historical population
Year	Pop.	±% p.a.
2006	96	—
2013	111	+2.10%
2018	117	+1.06%
2023	93	−4.49%

Mangamahu had a population of 93 in the 2023 New Zealand census, a decrease of 24 people (−20.5%) since the 2018 census, and a decrease of 18 people (−16.2%) since the 2013 census. There were 42 males and 51 females in 36 dwellings. The median age was 37.5 years (compared with 38.1 years nationally). There were 21 people (22.6%) aged under 15 years, 15 (16.1%) aged 15 to 29, 42 (45.2%) aged 30 to 64, and 15 (16.1%) aged 65 or older.

People could identify as more than one ethnicity. The results were 87.1% European (Pākehā), and 32.3% Māori. English was spoken by 96.8%, and Māori by 3.2%. No language could be spoken by 3.2% (e.g. too young to talk). The percentage of people born overseas was 3.2, compared with 28.8% nationally.

Religious affiliations were 16.1% Christian, and 6.5% Māori religious beliefs. People who answered that they had no religion were 64.5%, and 9.7% of people did not answer the census question.

Of those at least 15 years old, 12 (16.7%) people had a bachelor's or higher degree, 39 (54.2%) had a post-high school certificate or diploma, and 21 (29.2%) people exclusively held high school qualifications. The median income was $28,200, compared with $41,500 nationally. 6 people (8.3%) earned over $100,000 compared to 12.1% nationally. The employment status of those at least 15 was 33 (45.8%) full-time and 15 (20.8%) part-time.

== Education ==
Mangamahu Primary School is a co-educational state primary school for Year 1 to 8 students, with a roll of 6 as of July 2026. It opened in 1894.
