= Raetihi =

Town in Manawatū-Whanganui, New Zealand

- Minor urban area
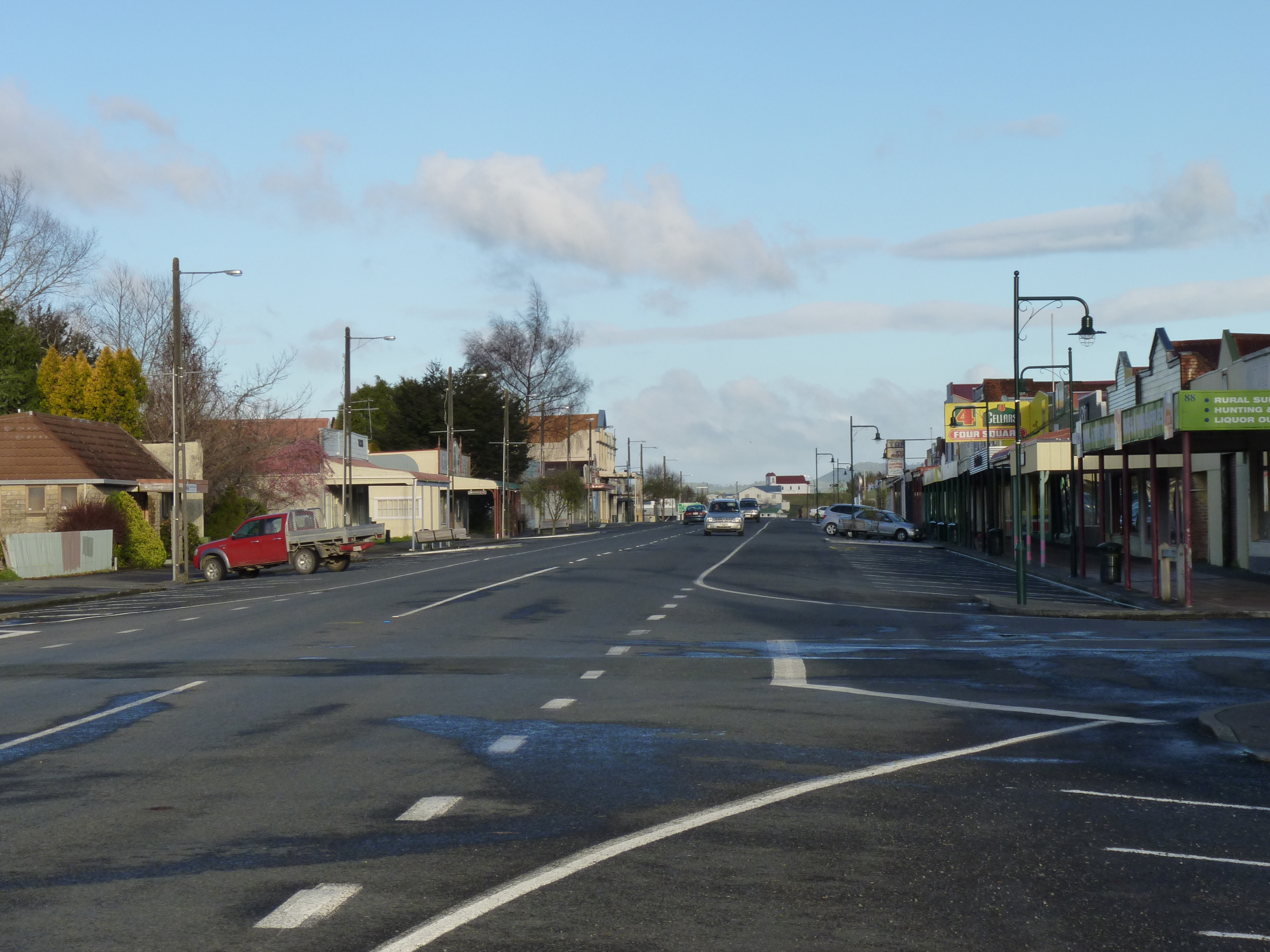
- Seddon Street in Raetihi
- Interactive map of Raetihi
- Coordinates: 39°25.5′S 175°17′E
- Country: New Zealand
- Region: Manawatū-Whanganui
- District: Ruapehu District
- Ward: Ruapehu General Ward; Ruapehu Māori Ward
- Community: Waimarino-Waiouru Community
- Electorates: Whanganui; Te Tai Hauāuru (Māori)

Government
  - Territorial Authority: Ruapehu District Council
  - Regional council: Horizons Regional Council
  - Mayor of Ruapehu: Weston Kirton
  - Whanganui MP: Carl Bates
  - Te Tai Hauāuru MP: Debbie Ngarewa-Packer

Area
  - Total: 3.86 km^{2} (1.49 sq mi)

Population (June 2025)
  - Total: 1,140
  - Density: 295/km^{2} (765/sq mi)
- Postcode(s): 4632

Raetihi is a small town in the centre of New Zealand's North Island, located at the junction of State Highways 4 and 49 in the Manawatū-Whanganui region. It lies in a valley between Tongariro and Whanganui National Parks, 11 kilometres west of Ohakune's ski fields.

== History and economy ==
=== Māori settlement ===
Evidence of Māori people living here in the fourteenth century has been found. Ngāti Uenuku dwelled at Raetihi. There is little evidence of large permanent settlements but hunting parties were common during warmer months.

=== 19th century ===
In 1887 the Government purchased the Waimarino block from local Māori, and the first European settlement, at Karioi, involved setting sheep to graze on open tussock land. Between 1908 and 1947 the area provided 700 million superficial feet of building timber. The remnants of 150 sawmills have been discovered, and the milling of rimu, tōtara, kahikatea, mataī, and beech trees employed many people.

Raetihi (originally named "Makotuku", due to the river flowing at the town's edge) became the focal point for travellers going between Whanganui and Waiouru. A thriving town emerged to serve the timber workers and those passing through. A trip North from Whanganui was not for the faint-hearted. The scenic "River Road" passing through Pipiriki was treacherous with primitive tracks and long falls if you left the track. Those who completed the journey to Raetihi found hospitality, accommodation, blacksmiths and saddlers for weary horses and supplies for their further travels north.

=== 20th century ===
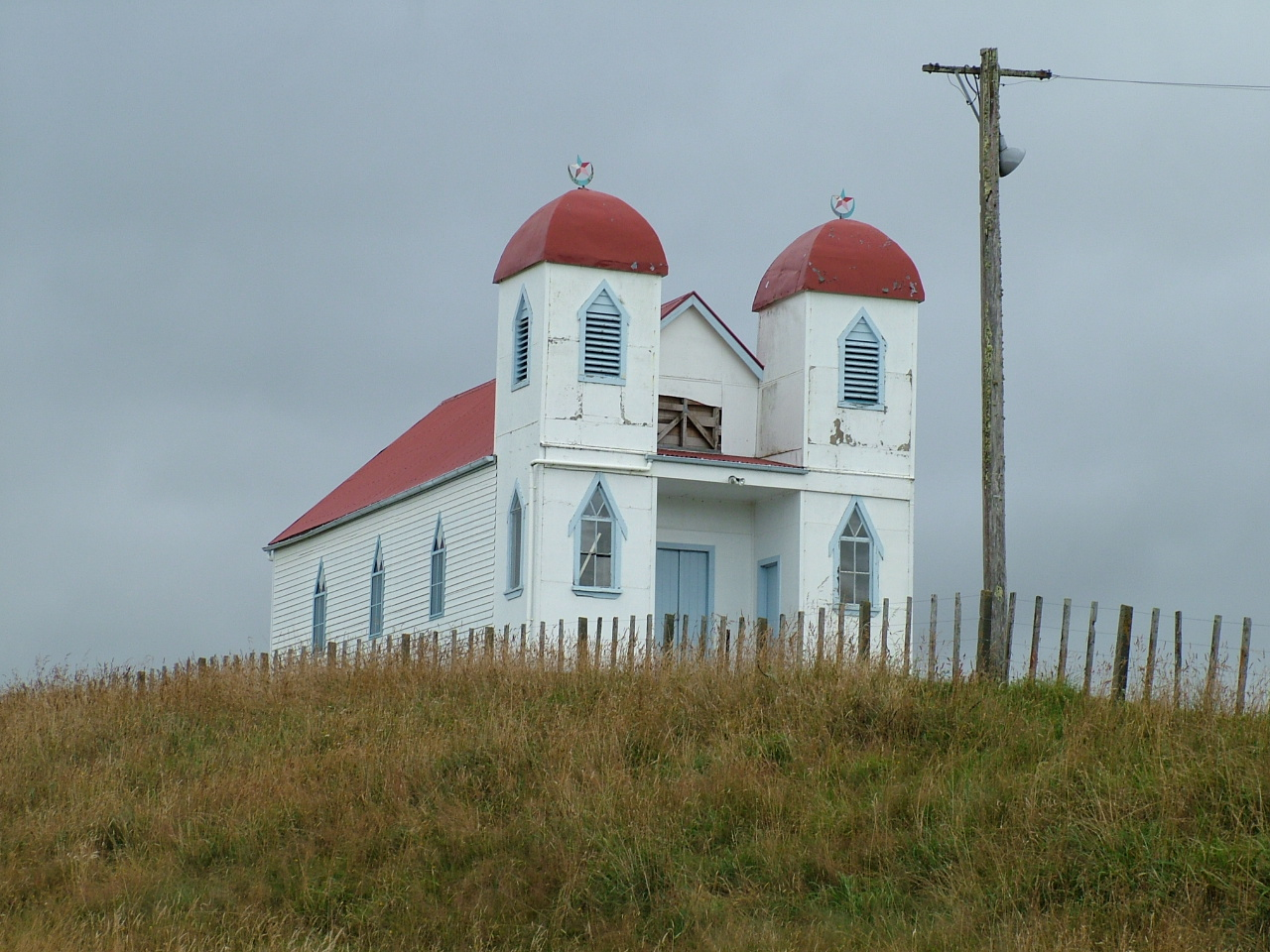
Rātana Church

The great fire of 1918 was a setback to many businesses and homeowners in Raetihi. The loss of numerous mills slowed the timber industry but it continued successfully into the 1940s, when the supply of strong native timber began running out. Replanting forests in fast-growing pine was a consideration, but at the time it was not possible to treat this relatively soft wood effectively to make it suitable for outdoor uses.

Although farming was an option for some, it could not equal forestry as an employer. From the 1970s through to the 1990s, Raetihi, like many rural New Zealand towns, suffered from a depressed economy. As elsewhere in New Zealand, sheep farming has also declined, and the two most prominent agricultural activities are cattle farming and vegetable growing.

=== 21st century ===
At present, tourist attractions such as the Dinosaur House Museum and Mountains to Sea Cycle Trail (part of Ngā Haerenga, New Zealand's national network of cycle trails) and various commercial operations providing opportunities to explore the Whanganui River offer hope for a more diverse economic future. Its close proximity to Mount Ruapehu and popular ski-fields has led to the establishment of accommodation and cafes to cater for the increasing number of visitors.

The setting of John Mulgan's classic novel Man Alone, particularly that of Stenning's farm, is based on Raetihi.

During the 2023 New Zealand census, Raetihi recorded a population of 1,119.

In early July 2025, Stuff reported that the close of Winestone's Pulp International's pulp and timber mills in the Ruapehu District in August 2024 had adversely affected Raetihi, leading to emigration and economic decline. The two mills had hired a significant number of local residents.

== Railway and museum ==
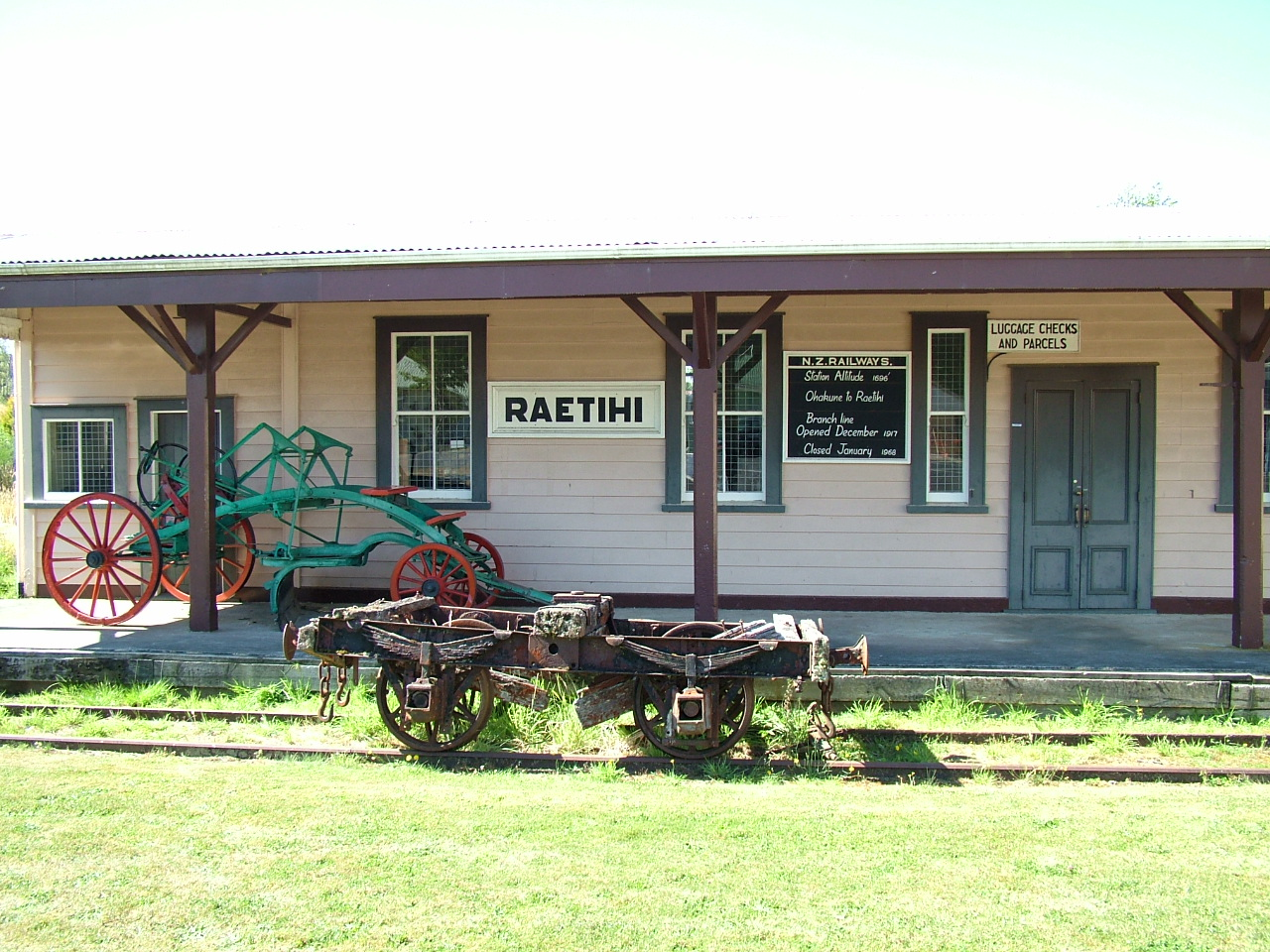
Waimarino museum

From 18 December 1917 to 1 January 1968, Raetihi was served by the Raetihi Branch, a branch line railway that diverged from the North Island Main Trunk in Ohakune. The station building remains in the town today, relocated from its original site and restored as part of the Waimarino Museum. The museum holds an archive of documents and photographs from the broader Ruapehu area, some of which are available online. It was originally situated on Station Road near the Makotuku River bridge on the road to Ohakune. When the railway reached Raetihi in 1917, it played a vital part in the logging industry. Closed to passengers in 1951, the line ceased operations completely in 1968 due to the decline in tree felling and milling.

The railway station building was moved to its present site on Seddon Street in 1981, seven years after the formation of the museum society. Two more buildings, the jail cells and stables, were moved from their original location by the Makotuku River to the museum site in 1983.

The museum holds documents, photographs, and items of daily life showing the progression of the town from its beginnings as a Māori settlement in the 19th century, the arrival of timber mills and large scale logging between 1900 and 1960, and the slow decline of the town following the end of the logging boom to the present.

The museum is run by volunteers and is open for viewing most weekends and by appointment. A number of archival photographs and documents are available for wider viewing on the museum's website.

== Connection with New Zealand film production ==
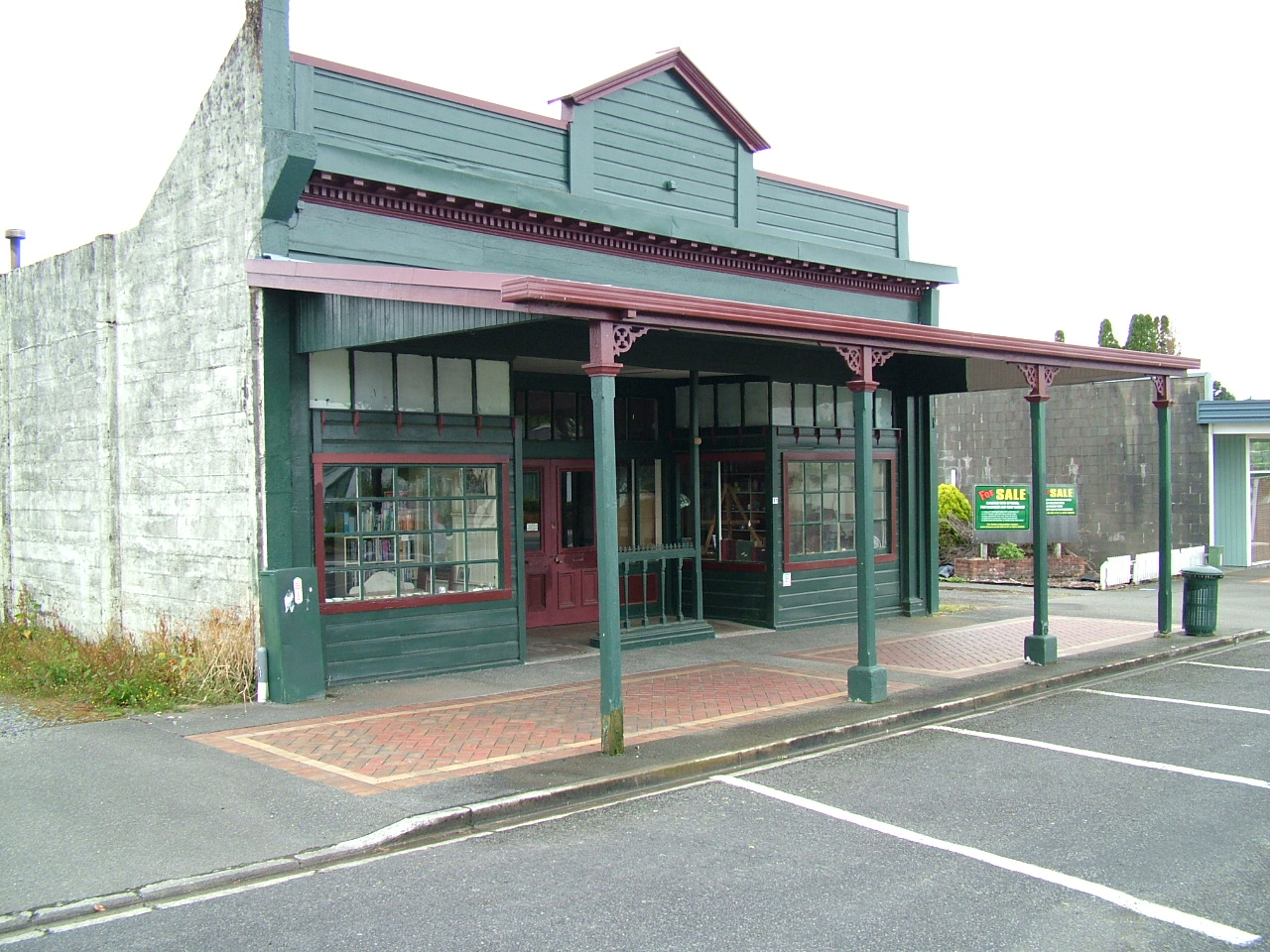
Vintage Building

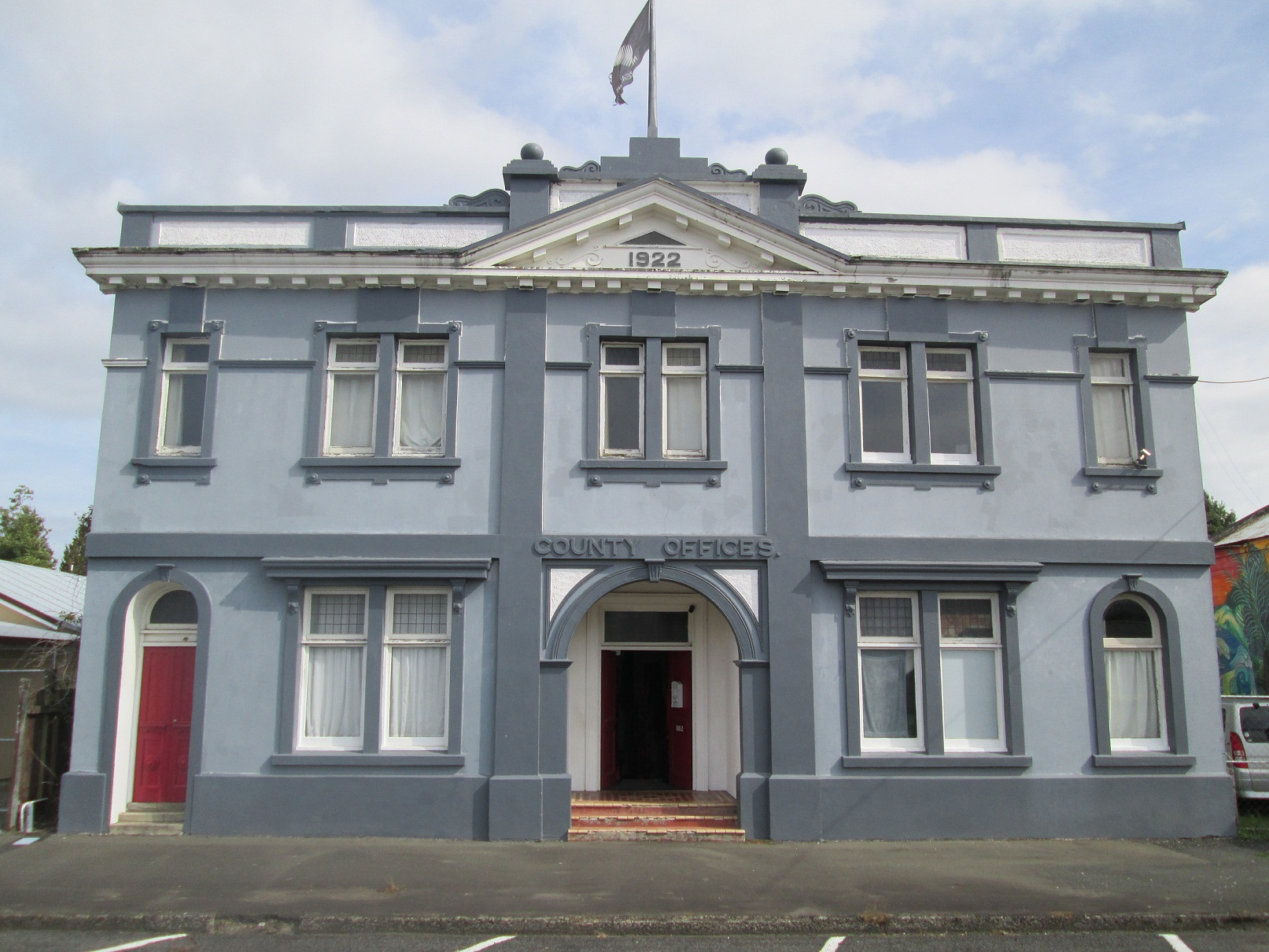
Waimarino County Offices (Former)

Raetihi's economic difficulties made it the perfect location for Skin Deep (1978; Geoff Steven), a black comedy and social satire about a town much like Raetihi. In the film, the local council, made up largely of local businessmen, decide that one way to improve the economy would be to hire a woman to come in from Auckland and provide massages at the local gym.

Larry Parr, writer, director, and producer of films and teleplays, as well as Chief Executive/Kaihautū of Te Māngai Pāho, grew up in Raetihi. In 1986 his New Zealand comedy starring Billy T. James, Came a Hot Friday (directed by Ian Mune), premiered there.

For Without a Paddle (2004; Steven Brill), an American film featuring Burt Reynolds, local traffic signs were replaced with American-style signs and cars drove on local roads as though in the United States. Raetihi also provided the closest access point for several scenes in Vincent Ward's River Queen (2005); Horopito, setting for much of Smash Palace (1981; Roger Donaldson), another New Zealand film, is also nearby.

=== Timeline ===
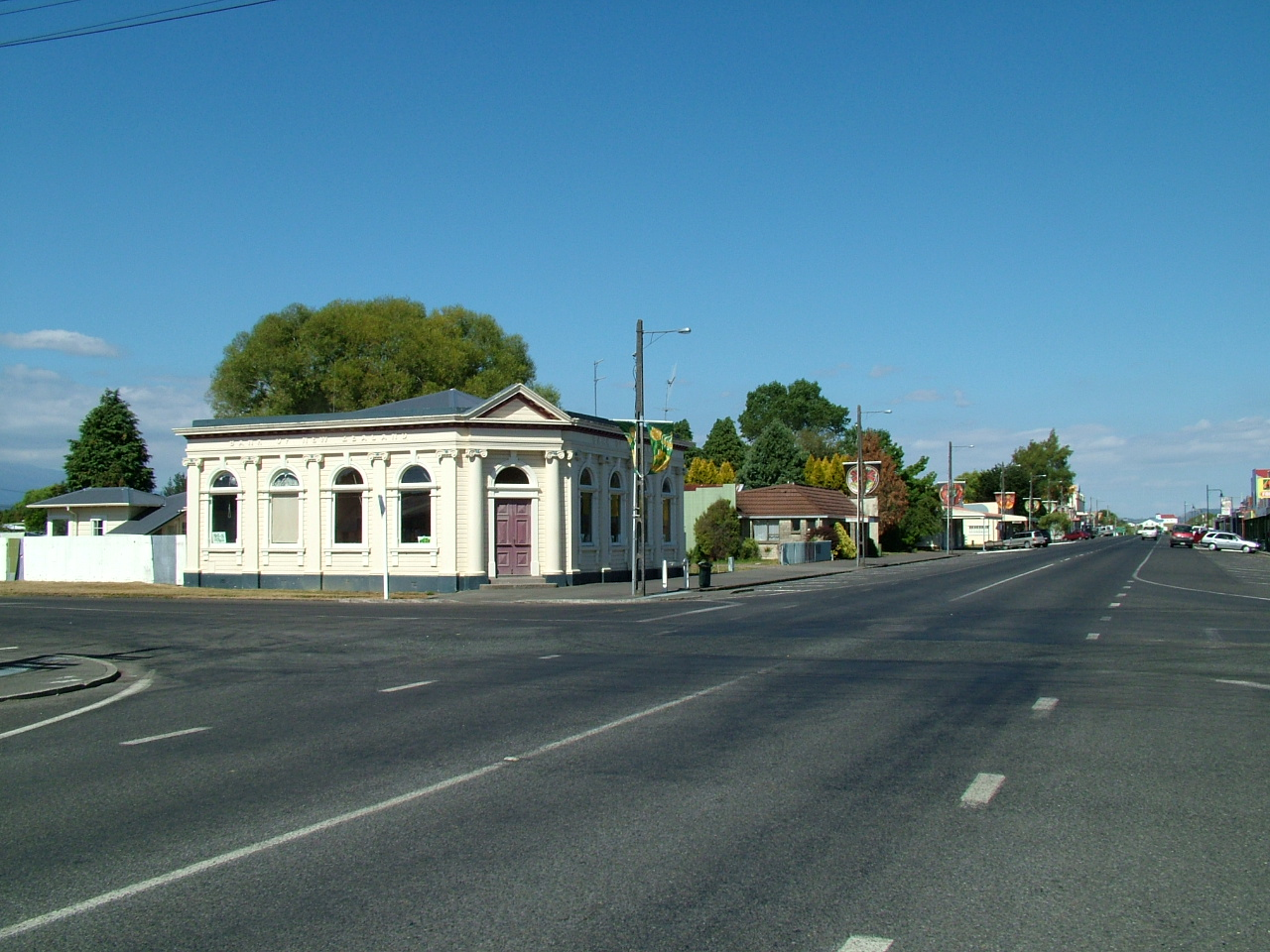
The Bank of New Zealand (Former)

- 1892 – Raetihi is founded through the government purchase of the Waimarino Block. Until the Main Trunk Line in completed in 1907, Raetihi is accessible mainly via the Whanganui River and horse and dray from Pipiriki.
- 1896 – Raetihi School opens – with a roll of 36. Mr W. Hird, of Nelson is first principal.
- 1900 – Raetihi is the largest centre of the King Country with almost 4,500 people.
- 1903 – co-operative dairy company established.
- 1911 – The double-fronted Bank of New Zealand building opens on 17 March under the management of TM Butts, on its current Seddon Street site.
- 1915 – Royal Theatre Opens in lower Seddon Street
- 1917 – Railway branch line reaches Raetihi.
- 1918, 18 March – The 'Great Fire' – about 200 houses were destroyed.
- 1918 – Influenza epidemic.

=== Marae ===
In addition to a Rātana Church, there are six marae or marae grounds in the Raetihi area associated with local iwi and hapū:

- Mākaranui Marae is affiliated with the Ngāti Tamakana hapū of Ngāti Uenuku.
- Mangamingi Marae and Tamakana meeting house are affiliated with Ngāti Uenuku.
- Marangai Marae is affiliated with the Ngāti Rangi hapū of Uenukumanawawiri.
- Mō te Katoa Marae and Motekatoa meeting house are affiliated with the Ngāti Rangi hapū of Ngāti Patutokotoko and Uenukumanawawiri, and with Ngāti Uenuku.
- Raetihi Marae and Ko te Whakaarotahi ki te Whakapono meeting house are affiliated with the Ngāti Rangi hapū of Uenukumanawawiri and with Ngāti Uenuku.
- Tuhi Ariki Marae and Tuhi Ariki meeting house are affiliated with the Ngāti Rangi hapū of Ngāi Tuhi Ariki.

In October 2020, the Government committed $1,076,297 from the Provincial Growth Fund to upgrade a group of 7 marae in the region, including Mākaranui Marae, Mangamingi Marae and Raetihi Marae, creating 129 jobs.

== Demographics ==
Stats NZ describes Raetihi as a small urban area, which covers 3.86 km^{2} (1.49 sq mi)/ It had an estimated population of 1,140 as of June 2025, with a population density of 295 people per km^{2}.

Historical population
Year	Pop.	±% p.a.
2006	1,035	—
2013	1,002	−0.46%
2018	1,038	+0.71%
2023	1,119	+1.51%

Raetihi had a population of 1,119 in the 2023 New Zealand census, an increase of 81 people (7.8%) since the 2018 census, and an increase of 117 people (11.7%) since the 2013 census. There were 567 males, 549 females, and 3 people of other genders in 378 dwellings. 2.1% of people identified as LGBTIQ+. The median age was 34.5 years (compared with 38.1 years nationally). There were 303 people (27.1%) aged under 15 years, 195 (17.4%) aged 15 to 29, 459 (41.0%) aged 30 to 64, and 165 (14.7%) aged 65 or older.

People could identify as more than one ethnicity. The results were 57.1% European (Pākehā); 64.9% Māori; 2.7% Pasifika; 2.7% Asian; 0.3% Middle Eastern, Latin American and African New Zealanders (MELAA); and 0.5% other, which includes people giving their ethnicity as "New Zealander". English was spoken by 96.8%, Māori by 13.9%, Samoan by 0.3%, and other languages by 2.4%. No language could be spoken by 2.4% (e.g. too young to talk). New Zealand Sign Language was known by 0.3%. The percentage of people born overseas was 6.4, compared with 28.8% nationally.

Religious affiliations were 22.5% Christian, 0.3% Hindu, 15.0% Māori religious beliefs, 0.3% Buddhist, 0.5% New Age, and 0.8% other religions. People who answered that they had no religion were 47.7%, and 13.4% of people did not answer the census question.

Of those at least 15 years old, 81 (9.9%) people had a bachelor's or higher degree, 432 (52.9%) had a post-high school certificate or diploma, and 300 (36.8%) people exclusively held high school qualifications. The median income was $33,200, compared with $41,500 nationally. 51 people (6.2%) earned over $100,000 compared to 12.1% nationally. The employment status of those at least 15 was 405 (49.6%) full-time, 105 (12.9%) part-time, and 12 (1.5%) unemployed.

== Education ==
Raetihi Primary School is a co-educational state primary school for Year 1 to 8 students, with a roll of 89 as of July 2026. It opened in 1896.
