= Whangaehu River =

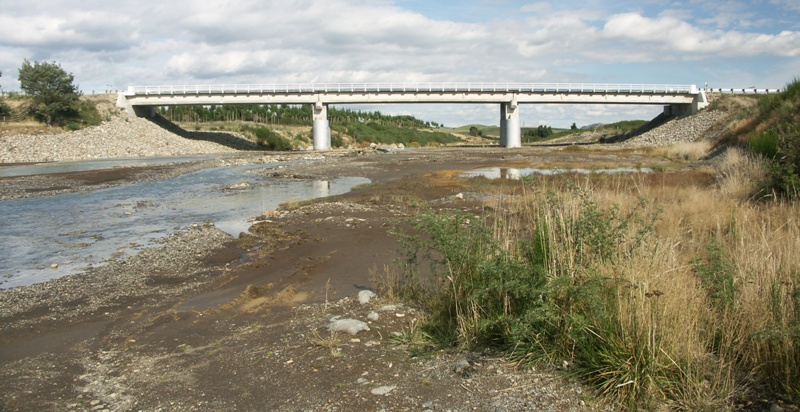
- The State Highway 49 bridge at Tangiwai
- Etymology: Māori meaning "muddy / murky harbour"
- Native name: Whangaehu (Māori)

Location
- Country: New Zealand
- Region: Manawatū-Whanganui

Physical characteristics
- Source: Crater lake
  - location: Mount Ruapehu
  - coordinates: 39°17′2″S 175°33′50″E
  - elevation: 2,550 metres (8,370 ft)
- Mouth: Tasman Sea
  - coordinates: 40°2′28″S 175°6′0″E
  - elevation: Sea level
- Length: 161 kilometres (100 mi)

Basin features
- Tributaries
  - right: Wahianoa River, Mangawhero River

The Whangaehu River is a large river in the central North Island of New Zealand. Its headwaters are the crater lake of Mount Ruapehu on the central plateau, and it flows into the Tasman Sea eight kilometres southeast of Whanganui. Due to the high acidity of the water coming from the crater lake, water is not diverted from the headwaters for the Tongariro Power Scheme. Instead, it bypasses the Waihianoa Aqueduct via a ford.

== Length ==
The river flows for 161 kilometres (100 mi) southward to the South Taranaki Bight near the settlement of Whangaehu.

== Notoriety ==
The sudden collapse of part of the Ruapehu crater wall on 24 December 1953 led to New Zealand's worst railway accident, the Tangiwai disaster. A lahar – a sudden surge of mud-laden water – swept down the river, significantly weakening the structure of a railway bridge at the small settlement of Tangiwai. The overnight express train between Wellington and Auckland passed over the bridge minutes later, causing it to collapse into the turbulent waters. Of the 285 people on the train, 151 were killed.

== Timeline ==
- 13 December 1859: The bridge was washed away.
- In February 1862 James Coutts Crawford was given a number of old songs and "various accounts of the taniwha, one of whom we were told overthrew the Wangaehu bridge."
- 1889: flood caused by the eruptions of Ruapehu.
- 1895: flood caused by the eruptions of Ruapehu.
- 24 December 1953: Tangiwai disaster
- 18 March 2007: Mt Ruapehu crater lake burst releasing an estimated 1.29 billion cubic metres of water, mud, and sludge; the Ruapehu ERLAWS alarm successfully activated preventing any accidents. This lahar was 50% bigger than the 1953 lahar that caused the Tangiwai disaster.

== Geology ==
The river is often poisoned with toxic chemicals from the volcanic activity in and around Mount Ruapehu. The upper part of the river begins as the meltwater from a small glacier. When hot water from the lake spills, it quickly melts the ice and snow in the glacier forming a cave-like tunnel.
