= List of marae in Manawatū-Whanganui =

This is a list of marae (Māori meeting grounds) in the Manawatū-Whanganui region of New Zealand.

In October 2020, the Government committed $7,139,349 from the Provincial Growth Fund to upgrade 33 marae in the region, with the intention of creating 560.5 jobs.

== Ruapehu District ==
Marae name	Wharenui name	Iwi and hapū	Location
Hia Kaitupeka	Hari	Ngāti Maniapoto (Hari, Te Kanawa), Ngāti Hāua (Ngāti Hira)	Taringamotu
Kākāhi Marae	Taumaihiorongo	Ngāti Tūwharetoa (Ngāti Manunui)	Kākāhi
Kauriki	Te Ōhākī	Ngāti Tūwharetoa (Ngāti Hinemihi, Ngāti Turumakina)	Ngāpuke
Kimihia	No wharenui	Ngāti Te Wera	Taumarunui
Te Kōura	Te Karohirohi	Ngāti Maniapoto (Pahere), Te Āwhitu	Ōngarue
Mākaranui	No wharenui	Ngāti Uenuku	Raetihi
Mana Ariki Marae	Mana Ariki	Ngāti Hekeāwai	Taumarunui
Mangamingi	Tamakana	Ngāti Uenuku	Raetihi
Marangai Marae	No wharepuni	Ngāti Rangi (Uenukumanawawiri)	Raetihi
Maungārongo	Tikaraina Ringapoto / Ko Te Kingi o Te Maungārongo	Ngāti Rangi (Ngāti Tui-o-Nuku)	Ohākune
Maniaiti Marae	Te Aroha o Ngā Mātua Tūpuna	Ngāti Hāua (Ngāti Hekeāwai, Ngāti Hāua), Ngāti Tūwharetoa (Ngāti Hinemihi, Ngāti Manunui), Ngāti Hāua (Ngāti Hāua, Ngāti Hekeawai)	Manunui
Matua Kore Marae	Matua Kore	Ngāti Hāua (Ngāti Hāuaroa, Ngāti Hinewai, Ngāti Poutama)	Manunui
Morero	Hauaroa	Ngāti Hekeawai, Ngāti Hāua (Ngāti Hāuaroa, Ngāti Reremai)	Taumarunui
Mō te Katoa	Motekatoa	Ngāti Rangi (Ngāti Patutokotoko, Uenukumanawawiri, Ngāti Uenuku)	Raetihi
Ngā Mōkai	Whakarongo	Ngāti Rangi (Ngāti Tongaiti)	Ohākune
Ngāpuwaiwaha	Te Taurawhiri a Hinengākau	Ngāti Hāua (Ngāti Hāua, Ngāti Hāuaroa)	Taumarunui
Pāpākai	Rākeipoho	Ngāti Tūwharetoa (Ngāti Hikairo)	Tongariro
Te Peka Marae	No wharenui	Ngāti Hāua (Ngāti Hekeāwai)	Taumarunui
Petania	Hinemihi	Ngāti Maniapoto (Hinemihi, Parewaeono, Rōrā), Ngāti Tūwharetoa (Ngāti Hinemihi)	Taumarunui
Raetihi Marae	Ko te Whakaarotahi ki te Whakapono	Ngāti Rangi (Uenukumanawawiri, Ngāti Uenuku)	Raetihi
Takaputiraha	Takaputiraha	Ngāti Maniapoto	Taumarunui
Te Rena	Hikairo	Ngāti Tūwharetoa (Ngāti Hikairo)	Kākāhi
Te Rongaroa	Ko Uehaeroa	Ngāti Maniapoto (Raerae, Rōrā)	Ōngarue
Te Rukirangi Marae	Papakainga	Ngāti Maniapoto (Te Rukirangi)	Ōhura
Tirorangi	Rangiteauria	Ngāti Rangi (Ngāti Rangihaereroa, Ngāti Rangiteauria, Ngāti Tongaiti)	Tangiwai
Tuhi Ariki Marae	Tuhi Ariki	Ngāti Rangi (Ngāi Tuhi Ariki)	Raetihi
Tū Whenua Marae	Tū Whenua	Ngāti Maniapoto (Mangu, Rewa, Tupu)	Taumarunui
Waimiha Marae	Te Ihingarangi	Ngāti Maniapoto (Te Ihingarangi)	Waimiha
Whānau Maria Marae	Whānau Maria	Ngāti Hāua (Ngāti Hāua)	Taumarunui
Wharauroa	Hikurangi	Ngāti Maniapoto (Hinemihi, Pahere, Rangatahi), Ngāti Hāua (Ngāti Hinewai, Ngāti Hāua, Ngāti Wera/Tuwera), Ngāti Hinewai, Ngāti Rangatahi)	Taumarunui

== Whanganui District ==
Marae name	Wharenui name	Hapū and iwi	Location
Te Aroha Marae	Te Kotahitanga	Ngāti Iti, Ngā Rauru (Ngāti Pūkeko, Tamareheroto)	Kai Iwi
Te Ao Hou Marae	Te Puawaitanga	Ngāti Tupoho, Ngāti Rangi (Ngāti Rangi-ki-tai)	Aramoho
Ātene / Kakata	Te Rangi-i-heke-iho	Ngāti Hineoneone	Parikino
Hiruhārama / Patiarero	Whiritaunoka	Ngāti Hau	Jerusalem
Kai Iwi Marae	Awhakaueroa	Ngāti Iti, Ngā Rauru (Ngāti Pūkeko, Tamareheroto)	Kai Iwi
Kaiwhaiki Marae	Te Kiritahi / Rongotepoi	Ngā Paerangi	Kaiwhaiki
Kauangāroa	Kimihia te Maramatanga	Ngāti Apa	Okoia
Kirikiriroa Marae	Kirikiriroa	Ngāti Hāua (Ngāti Ruru)	Pipiriki
Koriniti / Otukopiri	Te Waiherehere, Poutama	Ngāti Pāmoana	Koriniti
Mangapapapa	Te Oranga Wairua	Ngāti Kaponga / Taumata Māhoe	Parinui
Maranganui	Tuarua	Ngāti Tuera	Matahiwi
Matahiwi / Ohotu	Tānewai	Ngā Poutama, Ngāti Tānewai	Matahiwi
Onepoto Marae	No wharenui	Ngāti Paku	Parinui
Ōtoko	Tauakira	Te Awa Iti	Kakatahi
Pakaitore Marae	Pakaitore	Ngāti Hāua (Ngāti Hāua)	Gonville
Pākaraka	Te Whānau Pani II and III	Ngā Rauru (Ngāti Maika II)	Pākaraka
Papatupu	No wharenui	Ngāti Uenuku	Parinui
Paraweka	Pire Kiore	Ngāti Kurawhatia	Pipiriki
Parikino Marae	Ko Wharewhiti / Te Aroha	Ngāti Hinearo, Ngāti Tumango	Parikino
Parinui Pā	Kare o Ngā Putiputi o Io	Ngāti Rūrū	Parinui
Peterehema	Upokotauaki	Ngāti Hau	Jerusalem
Te Pou o Rongo	Tūmanako	Ngāti Ruakā, Ngāti Hine Korako	Rānana
Pungarehu Marae	Maranganui Tuarua	Ngāti Tuera	Parikino
Pūtiki Marae	Te Paku o Te Rangi / Aotea	Ngāti Tumango, Ngāti Tupoho	Pūtiki
Rānana / Ruakā	Te Morehu	Ngāti Ruakā, Ngāti Hine Korako	Rānana
Rākato Marae	Rākato	Ngāti Hine o Te Rā	Kaiwhaiki
Taipake Marae	Taipake	Ngāti Iti, Ngā Rauru (Ngāti Pūkeko, Tamareheroto)	Kai Iwi
Tawhata	Te Hinau	Ngāti Rangitengaue, Ngāti Tū, Ngāti Hāua (Ngāti Rangitengaue, Ngāti Tū)	Pipiriki
Tieke Marae	Te Puawaitanga o Hinekura	Ngāti Hinekura, Ngāti Hāua (Ngāti Hāua)	Tieke Kāinga
Waitahupārae Marae	Waitahupārae	Ngāti Patutokotoko, Ngāti Rangi (Ngāti Patutokotoko)	Matahiwi
Whangaehu Marae	Rangitahuahua	Ngāti Apa	Kaiwhaiki

== Rangitikei District ==
Marae name	Wharenui name	Iwi and Hāpu	Location
Kuratahi	Te Karere	Ngāti Rangi (Ngāti Rangituhia, Ngāti Parenga)	Taihape
Opaea	Tumakaurangi	Ngāti Tūwharetoa (Ngāti Tamakōpiri)	Taihape
Oruamatua / Te Riu o Puanga	Oruamatua	Ngāti Kahungunu (Ngāti Whiti)	Moawhango
Otāhuhu Marae	Te Ruku a Te Kawau	Ngāti Hauiti (Ngāti Haukaha)	Hunterville
Parewahawaha / Ōhinepuhiawe	Parewahawaha	Ngāti Raukawa (Ngāti Parewahawaha)	Bulls
Raketapauma	Rangituhia	Ngāti Rangi (Ngāti Rangituhia)	Taihape
Rātā / Te Hou Hou / Potaka	Hauiti	Ngāti Hauiti (Ngāti Ruaanga, Ngāti Tamateraka)	Hunterville
Tamakopiri	Tumakaurangi	Ngāti Kahungunu (Ngāti Tama)	Taihape
Whitikaupeka Marae	Whitikaupeka	Ngāti Tūwharetoa (Ngāti Tamakōpiri), Ngāti Kahungunu (Ngāti Tama, Ngāti Whiti, Ngāti Whitikaupeka)	Moawhango
Winiata Marae	Tautahi	Ngāti Hauiti (Ngāti Hinemanu, Ngāti Te Ngahoa), Ngāti Kahungunu (Ngāti Hinemanu, Ngāti Paki)	Taihape

== Manawatu District ==
Marae name	Wharenui name	Iwi and hapū	Location
Aorangi Marae	Maniaihu	Ngāti Kauwhata (Ngāti Tahuriwakanui)	Feilding
Kauwhata / Kai Iwi Pā	Kauwhata	Ngāti Kauwhata (Ngāti Hinepare)	Feilding
Iwa Tekau mā Iwa	Te Iwa	Ngāti Kauwhata (Ngāti Turoa)	Feilding
Te Hiiri o Mahuta Marae	Te Hiiri o Mahuta	Ngāti Raukawa (Ngāti Matakore, Ngāti Rangatahi)	Halcombe
Motuiti	Rakau / Paewai	Rangitāne (Ngāti Mairehau), Ngāti Raukawa (Ngāti Rākau)	Himatangi
Paranui	Turanga	Ngāti Raukawa (Ngāti Te Au, Ngāti Tūranga)	Himatangi
Poupatatē Marae	Poupatatē	Ngāti Raukawa (Ngāti Pikiahuwaewae)	Halcombe
Taumata o Te Rā	Manomano	Ngāti Raukawa (Ngāti Manomano)	Halcombe
Tini Waitara	Te Horo Taraipi	Ngāti Apa	Turakina
Tokorangi Marae	Te Tikanga	Ngāti Tūwharetoa (Ngāti Waewae)	Halcombe

== Palmerston North City ==
Marae name	Wharenui name	Iwi and hapū	Location
Te Hotu Manawa	Tūturu Pumau	Rangitāne (Ngāti Kapuārangi, Ngāti Rangiaranaki, Ngāti Rangitepaia, Ngāti Hineaute, Ngāti Tauira)	Awapuni

== Tararua District ==
Marae name	Wharenui name	Iwi and hapū	Location
Te Ahu a Turanga i Mua Marae	Te Huinga o Ngā Waka	Ngā Hau e Whā	Woodville
Kaitoki	Kaitoki Memorial Hall	Rangitāne (Ngāti Pakapaka, Ngāti Te Rangiwhakaewa)	Dannevirke
Mākirikiri	Aotea Tuatoru	Rangitāne (Ngāti Mutuahi, Ngāti Te Rangiwhakaewa)	Dannevirke
Pahiatua Marae	Te Kohanga Whakawhaiti	Rangitāne (Ngāti Hāmua, Te Kapuārangi)	Pahiatua
Pāpāuma	Te Aroha o Aohanga / Pāpāuma	Te Hika a Pāpāuma	Pongaroa
Whiti te Rā / Poherau	Mārama	Rangitāne (Ngāti Pakapaka)	Dannevirke

== Horowhenua District ==
Marae name	Wharenui name	Iwi and hapū	Location
Huia Marae	Huia	Ngāti Raukawa (Ngāti Huia)	Levin
Kawiu	Te Huia o Raukura	Muaūpoko	Levin
Kererū Marae	Mahinārangi	Ngāti Raukawa (Ngāti Takihiku, Ngāti Ngārongo)	Kōputaroa
Kikopiri Marae	Kikopiri	Ngāti Raukawa (Ngāti Hikitanga, Ngāti Kikopiri)	Ōhau
Kohuturoa	Pāriri	Muaūpoko	Hōkio
Matau Marae	Matau	Ngāti Raukawa (Ngāti Huia)	Levin
Ngātokowaru Marae	Ngātokowaru	Ngāti Raukawa (Ngāti Pareraukawa)	Hōkio
Tūkorehe	Tūkorehe	Ngāti Raukawa (Ngāti Tūkorehe)	Manakau
Whakawehi	Poutu	Ngāti Raukawa (Ngāti Whakatere)	Moutoa
Wehi Wehi	Wehi Wehi	Ngāti Raukawa (Ngāti Wehi Wehi)	Manakau

== See also ==
- Lists of marae in New Zealand
- List of marae in Taranaki
- List of schools in Manawatū-Whanganui
