= Hauāuru Māori =

Languages
- Māori language

Hauāuru Māori are a group of Māori iwi at or around the west coast of the North Island of New Zealand. It includes the iwi (tribe) of Te Āti Haunui-a-Pāpārangi and its affiliated iwi of Ngāti Hau. It also includes the iwi of Ngāti Tama, Ngāti Mutunga, Te Āti Awa, Taranaki, Ngāti Maru, Ngāruahine, Ngāti Ruanui, Ngā Rauru, Te Korowai o Wainuiārua, Ngāti Rangi, Ngāti Apa and Ngāti Hauiti.

Two of the iwi, Ngāti Tama and Te Āti Awa, also have tribal lands in the South Island.
