= Kawana flour mill =

Flour mill in New Zealand

Kawana flour mill and waterwheel
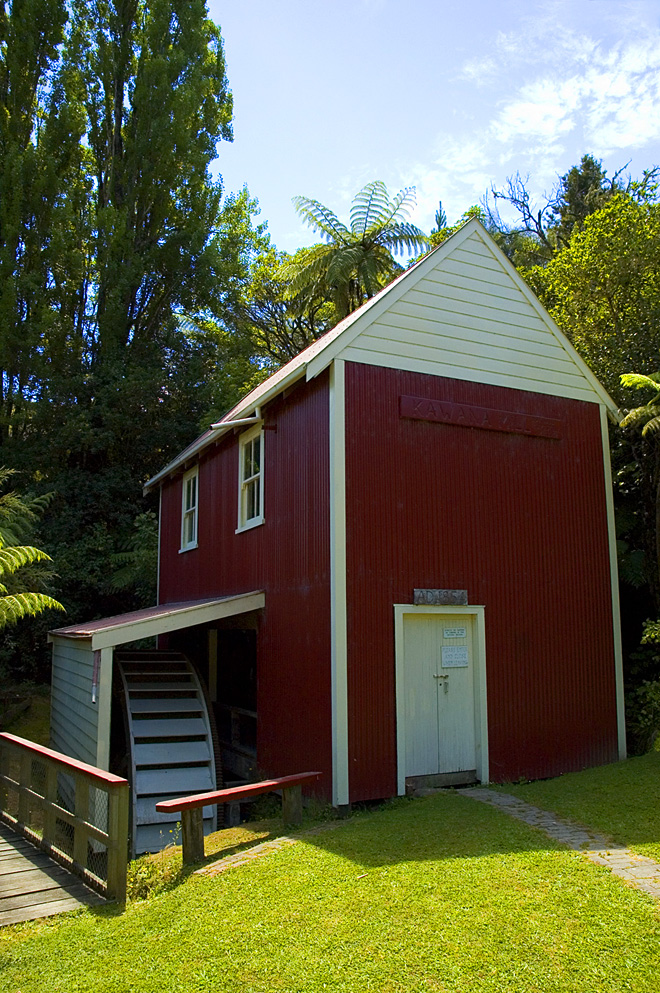
- Interactive map of the Kawana flour mill and waterwheel area

General information
- Location: Whanganui River Road; Matahiwi; New Zealand
- Coordinates: 39.59643°S 175.14914°E
- Construction started: 1854
- Renovated: 1978–80

Heritage New Zealand – Category 1
- Designated: 1 September 1983
- Reference no.: 158

The Kawana flour mill near Matahiwi was built in 1854, and is the last remaining flour mill on the Whanganui River and the only remaining 1850s mill machinery in New Zealand.

Wheat was an important early crop for the Whanganui District: by 1848, thanks to the influence of missionaries Richard Taylor and Father Jean Lampila, an estimated 30,000 acres (12,000 ha) was being grown by Māori along the Whanganui River. With funds from the government, local Māori, and Governor George Grey, several water-driven flour mills were built in the 1850s.

The mill at Matahiwi was named Kāwana Kerei in honour of Governor Grey, who had donated the millstones as a personal gift to the Ngā Poutama people. It was built by local Māori and millwright Peter McWilliam using 13 metres (43 ft) of totara logs, salvaged from the bottom of the river by 100 volunteers. The millstones from Melbourne and the cast-iron machinery and brass bearings from Britain were carried upstream by a fleet of 32 canoes. Over 200 workmen were needed to transport the millstones and machinery to the mill site, and they celebrated afterwards with a 'monster picnic' lasting several days.

Unlike many of the other Māori-owned mills, which only operated briefly, the Kawana mill ground flour for over 50 years. It was run until shortly before it closed by the Pākehā miller Richard ("William") Pestell, appointed by the New Zealand Government. Pestell had married into the Māori family of Temā Panitua and was known to them as Wiremu Petara. Upon his retirement, his second son Richard continued running the mill until it closed in 1913.

The building was gradually dismantled, only the machinery, wheel, and millstones surviving. In the 1930s its roofing iron was repurposed for the Matahiwi School. A two-room cottage belonging to Pestell also survived. The mill was rebuilt in the late 1970s to a design by architect Chris Cochran, the cottage was moved to its present site and restored, and both reopened to the public in October 1980.
