= Morvin Simon =

New Zealand composer and historian (1944–2014)

Morvin Simon MNZM
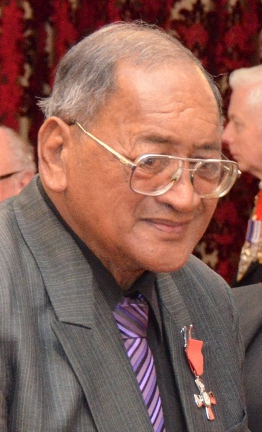
- Simon in 2013
- Born: Morvin Te Anatipa Simon; 1944; Kaiwhaiki, Manawatu-Wanganui, New Zealand
- Died: 14 May 2014 (aged 70); Wellington, New Zealand
- Spouse: Titikura Kipo Irimana Simon QSM

Morvin Te Anatipa Simon MNZM (1944 – 14 May 2014) was a New Zealand Māori composer, kapa haka leader, choirmaster and historian.

== Biography ==
Born at Kaiwhaiki marae on the Whanganui River, Simon was of Te Āti Haunui-a-Pāpārangi, Ngāti Apa and Ngāti Tūwharetoa descent. He was educated at Upokongaro School and Hato Paora College, and studied sociology and philosophy at Holy Name Seminary in Christchurch, and Māori language and oral literature at Victoria University of Wellington and Massey University.

Simon succeeded his father as choirmaster at Kaiwhaiki, recording the series of albums The Valley of Voices, volume 2 of which was a finalist for best Polynesian album at the 1983 New Zealand Music Awards. He composed or wrote lyrics for hundreds of songs, including classics such as Te Aroha (1983), and Moe, moe mai rā adapted from the Welsh lullaby Suo Gân, and others for special occasions including one in memory of Sir Archie Taiaroa. He was the leader of the kapa haka groups Te Matapihi and Te Taikura o te Awa Tupua.

An expert in the Māori language, Simon was appointed an adjunct professor by Te Wānanga o Aotearoa in 2004. He wrote a series of books Taku Whare E about the marae in the Whanganui region, with the third and final book focusing on his home marae of Kaiwhaiki.

In 2012, Simon was awarded an honorary Bachelor of Arts in Māori Performing Arts by Te Whare Wānanga o Awanuiārangi, in recognition of his contribution to kapa haka and cultural stewardship. In the 2013 Queen's Birthday Honours, he was appointed a Member of the New Zealand Order of Merit, for services to Māori. At the same time, his wife, Titikura Simon, was awarded the Queen's Service Medal, also for services to Māori.

Simon died in Wellington in 2014. Māori Party co-leader Tariana Turia paid tribute to Simon, saying "his waiata could move from tempestuous rapids to smooth waters that caress your every trouble away."
