= Paipai =

Paipai may refer to:

- Paipai people, an ethnic group of Mexico
- Paipai language, their language
- Magical Chinese Girl Paipai!, a Japanese television series

== See also ==
- Kāwana Pitiroi Paipai (? – 1884), a New Zealand leader
- Paepae, an element of traditional Maori houses
- Pay-Pay, a brand of cigarette rolling paper
- Pabai
- Baibai (disambiguation)
