= Koriniti =

Settlement upriver from Whanganui, New Zealand

Coordinates: 39°40′S 175°10′E

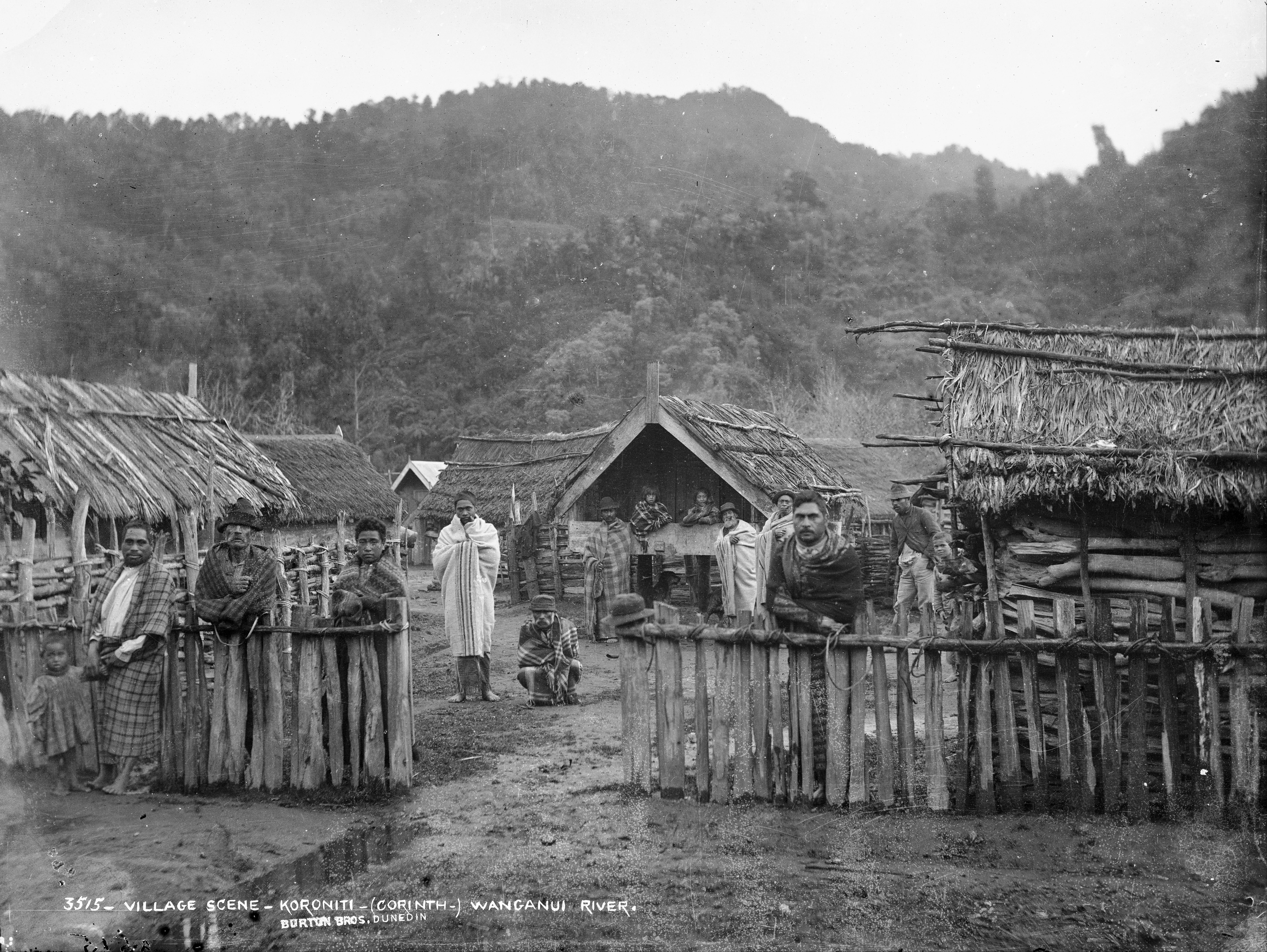
Koriniti village in 1885; photograph by Alfred Burton

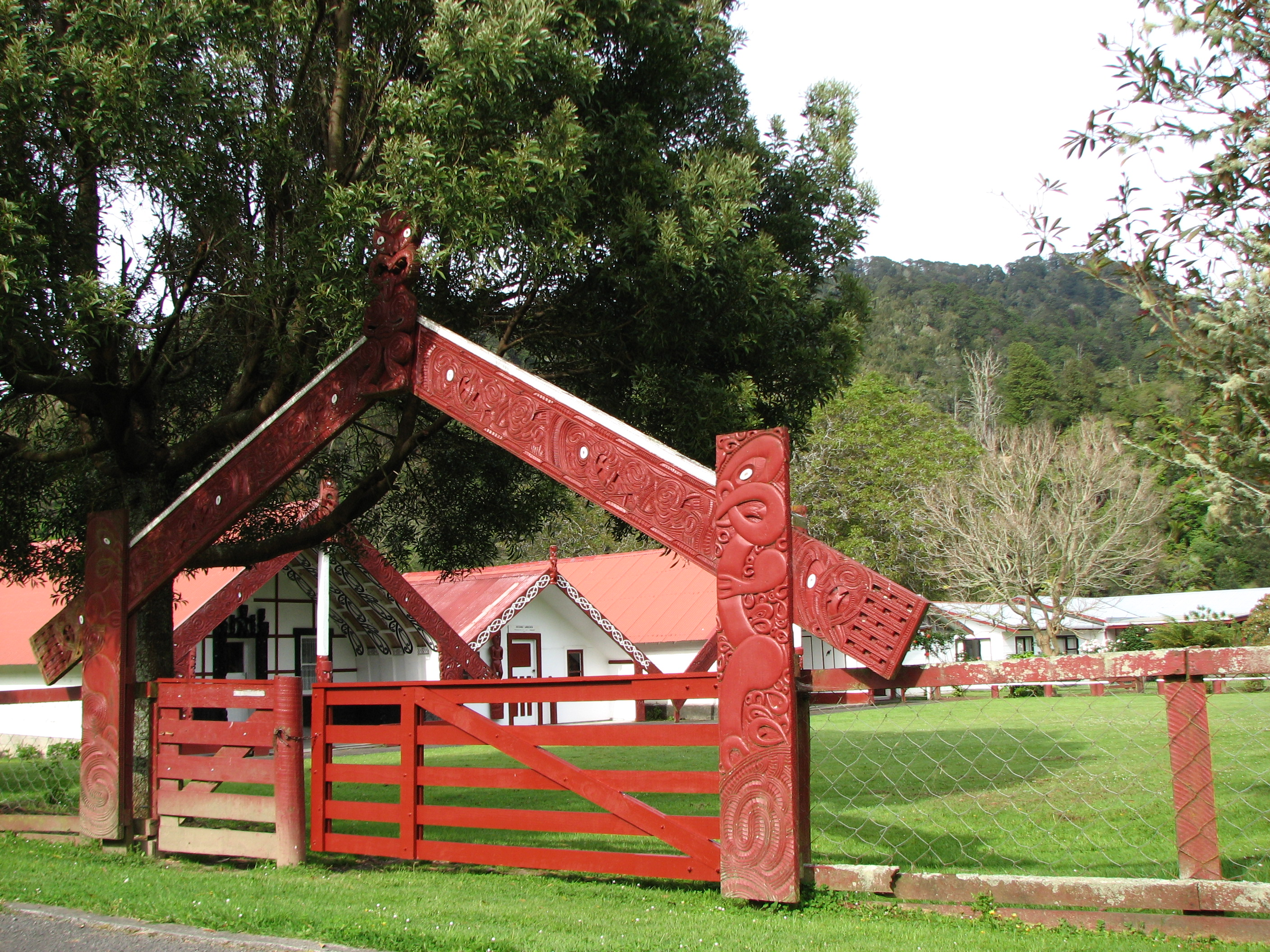
Koriniti Marae

Koriniti is a settlement 47 kilometres (29 mi) upriver from Whanganui, New Zealand, home to the Ngāti Pāmoana hapū of the iwi Te Āti Haunui-a-Pāpārangi.

The Māori settlement of Operiki was one of the larger on the Whanganui River, with a population of about 200. In 1848 the village was abandoned and a new one built in better agricultural land nearby at Otukopiri, renamed Koriniti by the missionary Richard Taylor, a Māori transliteration of Corinth.

Across the river from Koriniti, and reachable only by boat or cable car, is the Flying Fox lodge.

== Marae ==
The local marae (Māori meeting place) is known as Koriniti Marae or Otukopiri Marae. It has three wharenui (meeting houses): Hikurangi Wharerata; the original whare Te Waiherehere, restored by Hõri Pukehika in 1921; and Poutama, moved across the river from Karatia (Galatia) in 1967.

Ōperika pā, the original home of Ngāti Pamoana, is nearby.

In the 19th century Māori at Koriniti raised £400 to build a flour mill, which was completed in 1854, the same year as the Kawana flour mill near Matahiwi.

In October 2020, the Government committed $287,183 from the Provincial Growth Fund to upgrade the marae, creating 19 jobs.

== Notable people ==
- Rangi Hauiti Pōkiha (1895–1980), farmer, surveyor, and orator

== Climate ==
Climate data for Ahu Ahu Valley (1991–2020)
| Month | Jan | Feb | Mar | Apr | May | Jun | Jul | Aug | Sep | Oct | Nov | Dec | Year |
|---|---|---|---|---|---|---|---|---|---|---|---|---|---|
| Mean daily maximum °C (°F) | 24.0 (75.2) | 24.3 (75.7) | 22.1 (71.8) | 19.0 (66.2) | 16.3 (61.3) | 13.3 (55.9) | 13.1 (55.6) | 14.0 (57.2) | 15.9 (60.6) | 17.8 (64.0) | 19.5 (67.1) | 22.3 (72.1) | 18.5 (65.2) |
| Daily mean °C (°F) | 18.0 (64.4) | 18.2 (64.8) | 16.1 (61.0) | 13.9 (57.0) | 11.7 (53.1) | 9.1 (48.4) | 8.5 (47.3) | 9.1 (48.4) | 10.9 (51.6) | 12.7 (54.9) | 14.2 (57.6) | 16.7 (62.1) | 13.3 (55.9) |
| Mean daily minimum °C (°F) | 12.1 (53.8) | 12.1 (53.8) | 10.1 (50.2) | 8.8 (47.8) | 7.0 (44.6) | 4.8 (40.6) | 3.9 (39.0) | 4.3 (39.7) | 5.8 (42.4) | 7.5 (45.5) | 8.8 (47.8) | 11.1 (52.0) | 8.0 (46.4) |
| Average rainfall mm (inches) | 81.5 (3.21) | 95.5 (3.76) | 108.6 (4.28) | 96.6 (3.80) | 107.7 (4.24) | 123.3 (4.85) | 120.9 (4.76) | 100.5 (3.96) | 96.7 (3.81) | 109.2 (4.30) | 101.2 (3.98) | 94.2 (3.71) | 1,235.9 (48.66) |
Source: NIWA
