= Parinui =

Small Māori community in New Zealand

Coordinates: 39.269583°S 175.043847°E

Parinui is a small Māori community in New Zealand, based around the Mangatiti Stream on the middle reaches of the Whanganui River. The area, including the neighbouring settlement of Tieke Kāinga, is popular with tourists.

The community has four marae, used as meeting places by local Māori:

- Mangapapapa Marae Te Oranga Wairua meeting house, belonging to Ngāti Kaponga / Taumata Māhoe
- Onepoto Marae, belonging to Ngāti Paku
- Papatupu Marae, belonging to Ngāti Uenuku
- Parinui Pā and Kare o Ngā Putiputi o Io meeting house, belonging to Ngāti Rūrū
