= Francis Carter (sawmiller) =

New Zealand sawmiller

Francis John Carter (13 December 1869 – 3 January 1949) was a New Zealand sawmiller. He was born in Moutoa, Manawatu/Horowhenua, New Zealand.

In 2000, Carter was posthumously inducted into the New Zealand Business Hall of Fame.
