= Rangi Hauiti Pōkiha =

New Zealand Māori leader (1895–1980)

Rangi Hauiti Pōkiha (1895–1980) was a New Zealand farmer, surveyor, and orator. Of Māori descent, he identified with the Ngā Rauru and Ngāti Pamoana iwi. He was born in Koriniti beside the Whanganui River in 1895.
