= Kaiwhaiki =

New Zealand settlement

Coordinates: 39°50′S 175°05′E

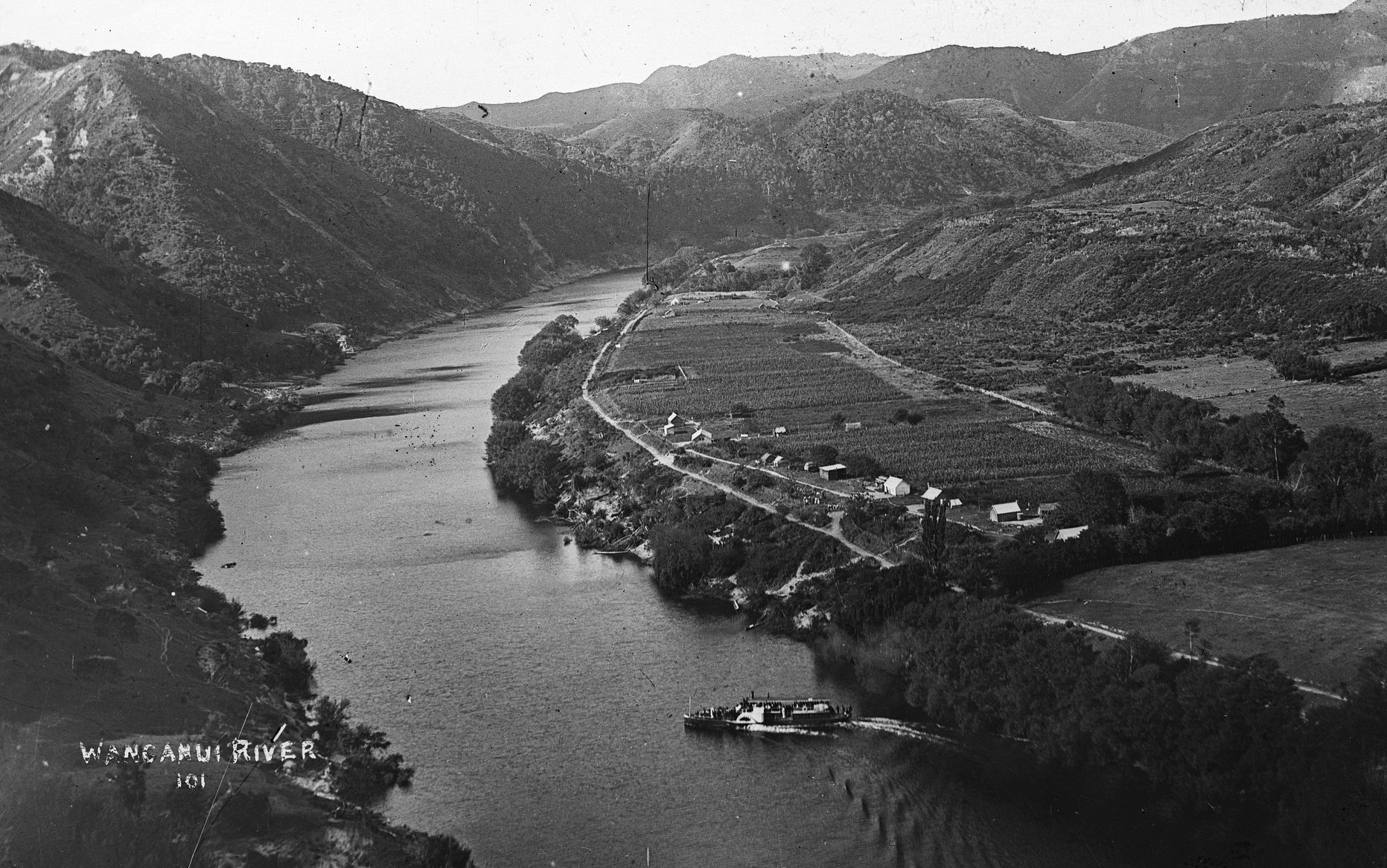
Looking down upon the Whanganui River, a paddle steamer ferry, and the town of Kaiwhaiki, c. 1910. Photograph taken by William Archer Price.

Kaiwhaiki is a settlement 18 kilometres (11 mi) upriver from Whanganui, New Zealand.

Kaiwhaiki in the 1840s was a small pā of a two to three dozen people. In Ronaldson's 1847 survey, the inhabitants were noted as being of the hapū Ngāti Rongomaitawhiri. In 1852 Kaiwhaiki became the first settlement on the Whanganui River to host a Catholic mission. By the early 1860s, it was described as a "large pa" and its population were mostly Kingites, opposed to the colonial government.

Kaiwhaiki is the home of the Ngā Paerangi hapū of the iwi Te Āti Haunui-a-Pāpārangi; their unique twin-gabled wharenui Te Kiritahi was built in 1912. It was the birthplace of composer and choirmaster Morvin Simon, who led the nationally known Kaiwhaiki-based kapa haka group Te Matapihi.

A quarry near Kaiwhaiki supplied the shellrock used to build the Durie Hill war memorial tower in Whanganui.

== Marae ==
Kaiwhaiki currently has three marae:

- Kaiwhaiki Marae and Te Kiritahi or Rongotepoi meeting house are affiliated with Ngā Paerangi
- Rākato Marae and Rākato meeting house are affiliated with Ngāti Hine o Te Rā
- Whangaehu Marae and its Rangitahuahua meeting house are affiliated with Ngāti Apa

In October 2020, the Government committed $377,123 from the Provincial Growth Fund to restore and renovate the Whangaehu Marae, creating 24 jobs.
