= Tongariro (disambiguation) =

Tongariro may refer to these features in New Zealand:

- Mount Tongariro
- Tongariro (New Zealand electorate)
- Tongariro (village)
- Tongariro National Park
- Tongariro River
