= Kotahitanga =

Kotahitanga (literally "a state of being at one") may refer to several things relating to the Māori people of New Zealand:

- Te Kotahitanga, a Māori parliament of the 1890s and 1900s
- Kotahitanga flag, a flag representing the unity of various Māori peoples
- Kotahitanga movement, a political union and alliance of disparate tribal groups that led to the Māori King Movement
- Kotahitanga church, a religious movement founded by Alexander Phillips and based at Manu Ariki marae, 8 km north of Taumarunui.
- ""Kotahitanga" (song), a 1999 Māori language dance pop single by Hinewehi Mohi and Jaz Coleman as the group Oceania
