= Whanganui Journey =

River cruise in New Zealand

Coordinates: 38.892°S 175.254°E

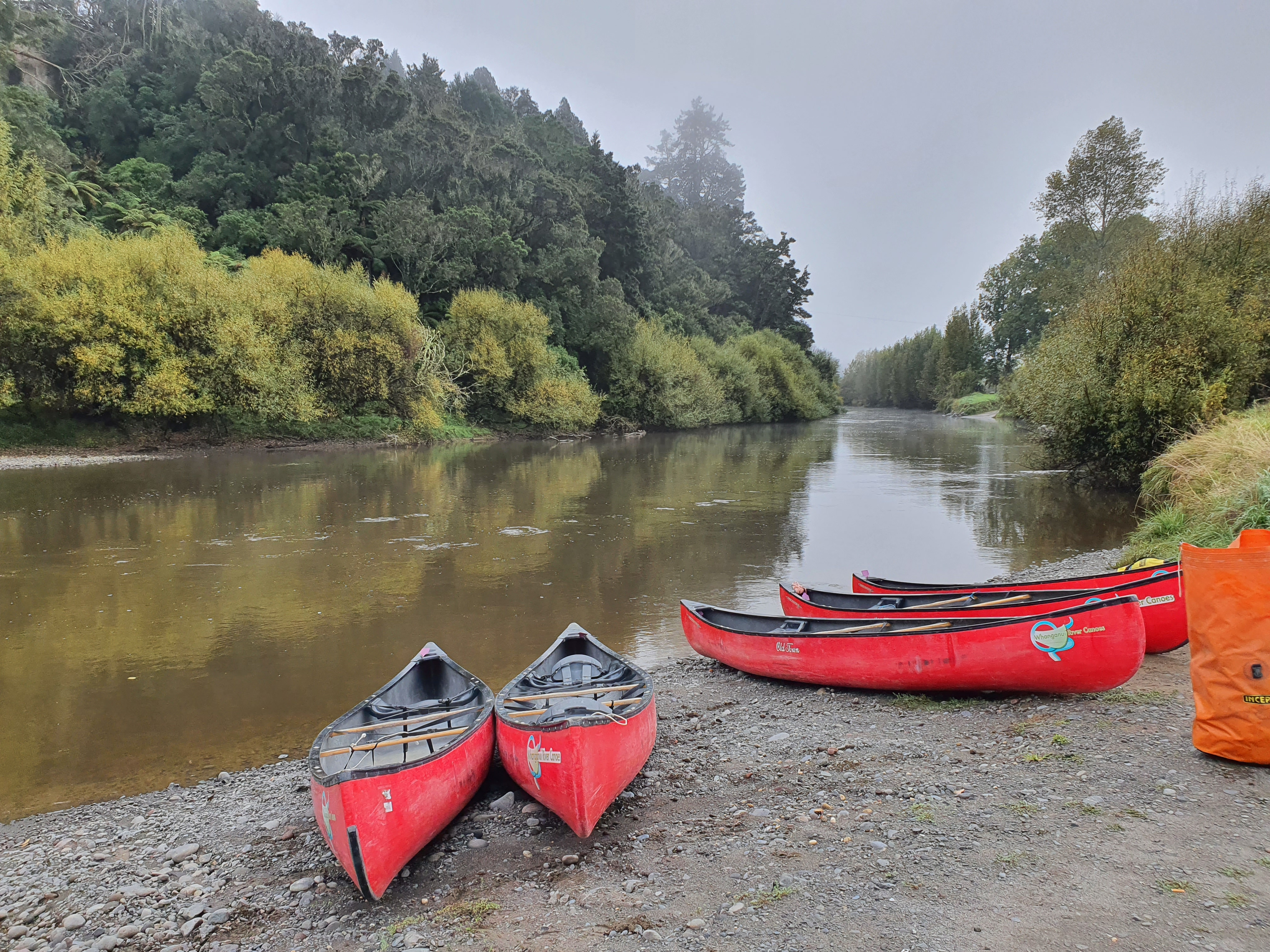
- Canoes at the confluence of the Ongarue and Whanganui River at the beginning of the Whanganui Journey
- Length: 145 km (90 mi)
- Location: Manawatū-Whanganui, New Zealand
- Designation: New Zealand Great Walk
- Trailheads: Taumarunui to Pipiriki
- Use: Canoeing and kayaking
- Elevation change: 89 metres (292 ft) drop
- Highest point: 144 m (472 ft), Taumarunui
- Lowest point: 55 m (180 ft), Pipiriki
- Grade: Class II
- Season: Late October to mid-April
- Website: Whanganui Journey

Trail map
- Whanganui National Park

The Whanganui Journey is a river journey along the Whanganui River in the North Island of New Zealand, travelling by canoe or kayak. The route runs from Taumarunui to Pipiriki, is 145 km long and usually takes 5 days to complete. It is managed by New Zealand's Department of Conservation under its Great Walks programme, and much of the route travels through land that is part of the Whanganui National Park.

== Route description ==
The route is broken into sections that are stretches of river between campsites or huts.

- Taumarunui to Ohinepane : 21.5 km
- Ohinepane to Poukaria : 14 km
- Poukaria to Maharanui : 17.5 km
- Maharanui to Whakahoro : 5 km
- Whakahoro to Mangapapa : 10 km
- Mangapapa to Ohauora : 15 km
- Ohauora to John Coull Hut : 12.5 km
- John Coull Hut to Mangawaiiti : 9.5 km
- Mangawaiiti to Mangapurua, including the Bridge to Nowhere : 9 km
- Mangapurua to Tieke : 10.5 km
- Tieke to Ngāporo : 12 km
- Ngāporo to Pipiriki : 9.5 km

During normal weather conditions the rapids on the river will not exceed grade II. As a result, there are several tour operators that offer a variety of trip combinations covering all or part of the route.

Although the Great Walk route ends at Pipiriki, the river is navigable for a further 89 km and some canoeists continue, to exit at the main bridge in Whanganui, which takes a further two days. Because the river is tidal closer to Whanganui, canoeists doing so need to leave Hipango Park on an outgoing tide.

== Accommodation ==
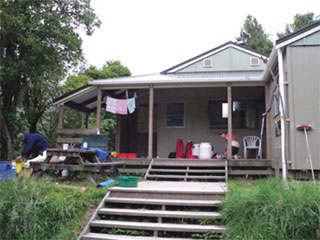
John Coull Hut

Accommodation on the route is in a combination of huts and campsites, which must be booked. River users must purchased a Facilities User Pass (FUP) if travelling on the river between 1 October and 30 April. It is cheaper to purchase the FUP before going on the river. They are available from the various operators, DOC in Whanganui, or from local Visitor Information Centres. There are different rates for different age groups, and for jetboaters. Most tour operators/canoe hire places will organize camp sites when travellers book with them, and they supply all safety equipment, a map, and transport to/from either end.
