= Whanganui National Park =

National park of New Zealand

- IUCN category II (national park)
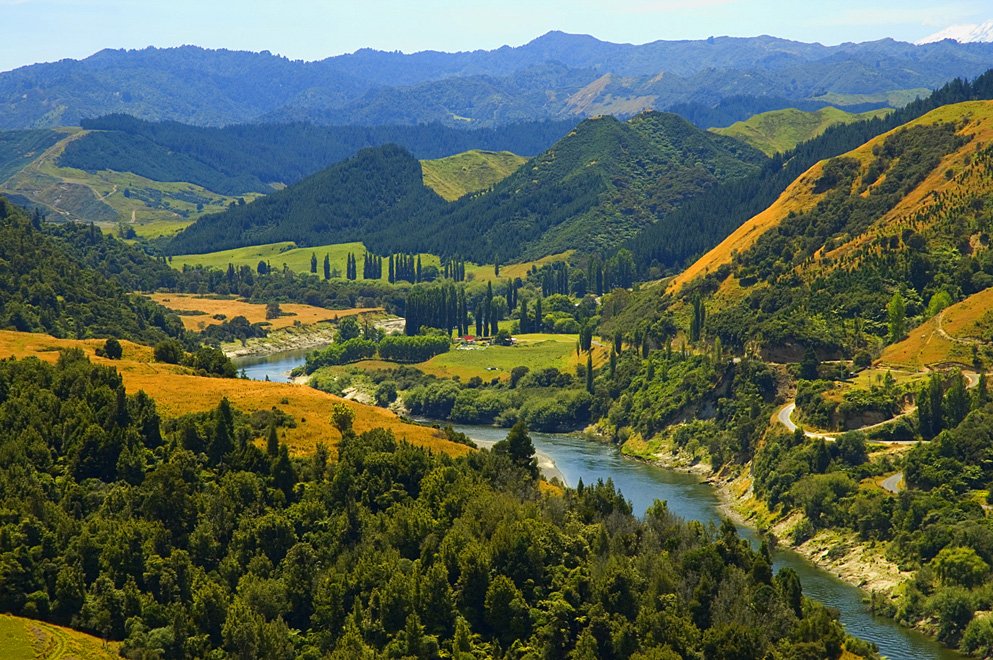
- Whanganui River flows through Whanganui National Park.
- Interactive map of Whanganui National Park
- Location: Wanganui, New Zealand
- Nearest city: Wanganui, New Zealand
- Coordinates: 39°35′0″S 175°5′0″E
- Area: 742 km^{2} (286 sq mi)
- Established: 1986
- Governing body: Department of Conservation

The Whanganui National Park is a national park located in the North Island of New Zealand. Established in 1986, it covers an area of 742 km^{2} bordering the Whanganui River. It incorporates areas of Crown land, former state forest and a number of former reserves. The river itself is not part of the park, but is a popular paddling route titled the Whanganui Journey, one of New Zealand's "Great Walks". The New Zealand Department of Conservation highlights Whanganui National Park as being the National Park most closely tied to human settlement.

== History ==
=== Use by Māori ===
The Whanganui river was a major trade and communication route for Māori, and would have been the main route into the central North Island. The river was once home to a network of pā alongside the river banks throughout what is now the Whanganui National Park. This was called ‘the plaited rope of Hinengākau’, named for a Te Āti Haunui-a-Pāpārangi ancestor.

The mid to late 19th century also saw the growing of wheat, and between the 1840s and 1860s flour mills were built to process this into flour that could be traded.

=== Early Pākehā ===
After the arrival of European settlers, Whanganui played a significant role for both Māori and European religious communities. In the 1840s there was widespread conversion to Christianity, which led to the establishment of Christian communities and building of chapels along the river. Likewise this area was also visited by followers of the Pai Mārire religion who had settlements nearby.

== Notable features ==
=== Bridge to Nowhere ===
The Bridge to Nowhere is a steel-reinforced concrete bridge, dating back to early 20th century European settlement in the area. From 1917 onwards, the New Zealand government offered retired serviceman returning from World War 1 discounted land, and loans for development, as part of the Soldier-Settler Scheme. This included land within the Mangapurua and Kaiwhakauka valleys within what is now the park. In 1919 a wooden swing bridge was constructed, which was replaced with a reinforced steel bridge in 1936. At the most populous point there were 30 farms in Mangapurua and 16 in Kaiwhakauka, however by 1942 only three farmers remained, and two years later the area was unpopulated. This decline was due in part to hardships of the land, including flooding and erosion, problems also experienced by Soldier-Settler Scheme recipients elsewhere. Today the bridge is used by park visitors and maintained by the Department of Conservation.

=== Tīeke Marae/Kāinga ===
The Tīeke Marae/Kāinga is a Department of Conservation hut and marae on the Whanganui Journey Great Walk. The buildings are situated near the Western border of the park, across the river from Parinui. The area upon which they are situated was the site of Māori communities at the time of European colonization, with contemporary European accounts recording the population of Tīeke to be 260 in 1847. The marae was established in the early 1990s by members of Tamahaki who trace their ancestry back to the original community. The land is currently subject to dispute, with the local Māori group, Te Whānau o Tieke, claiming that the land was confiscated illegally. The site is currently co-managed between the Department of Conservation and Te Whānau o Tieke. The site is open to the public, and available to be booked year round.

== Ecology ==
=== Flora ===
Whanganui National Park protects a large area of lowland forest and important habitat for native wildlife.

There are numerous stands of podocarp-hardwood forest made up of species including kāmahi and tawa, with rimu, mīro and tōtara on steeper terrain. In lower-lying areas near the river kahikatea, mataī and nīkau palm can be found. Large northern rātā grow throughout the park.

=== Fauna ===
Many species of birds can be found throughout the park. The park protects the habitat of several thousand threatened North Island brown kiwi and the endangered blue duck (whio). Other birds that frequent the park include the grey warbler, yellow-crowned kākāriki, New Zealand falcon (kārearea), New Zealand pigeon (kererū), Rifleman (titipounamu), silvereye, tomtit, tūī and whitehead.

Many species of native fish inhabit the Whanganui River that runs through the park, where native freshwater crayfish (kōura), black flounder, pouched lamprey and eels are also present.

== See also ==
- Bridge to Nowhere, New Zealand
- National parks of New Zealand
- Protected areas of New Zealand
- Conservation in New Zealand
