= Kai Iwi =

Settlement in Manawatū-Whanganui, New Zealand

- Interactive map of Kai Iwi
- Coordinates: 39.885°S 174.901°E
- Country: New Zealand
- Region: Manawatū-Whanganui
- District: Whanganui District
- Community: Whanganui Rural Community
- Electorates: Whanganui; Te Tai Hauāuru (Māori)

Government
  - Territorial Authority: Whanganui District Council
  - Regional council: Horizons Regional Council
  - Mayor of Whanganui: Andrew Tripe
  - Whanganui MP: Carl Bates
  - Te Tai Hauāuru MP: Debbie Ngarewa-Packer

Area
  - Total: 0.88 km^{2} (0.34 sq mi)

Population (June 2025)
  - Total: 200
  - Density: 230/km^{2} (590/sq mi)

Kai Iwi is a rural community west of Whanganui in New Zealand's North Island. It lies close to SH 3, approximately halfway between Whanganui and Waitotara.

Other than farming, the community's largest industry is its honey factory, which was founded in 2003.

== Demographics ==
Kai Iwi is described by Statistics New Zealand as a rural settlement. It covers 0.88 km^{2} (0.34 sq mi) and had an estimated population of 200 as of June 2025, with a population density of 227 people per km^{2}. It is part of the larger Mowhanau statistical area.

Historical population for Kai Iwi
Year	Pop.	±% p.a.
2006	168	—
2013	135	−3.08%
2018	141	+0.87%
2023	192	+6.37%

Kai Iwi had a population of 192 in the 2023 New Zealand census, an increase of 51 people (36.2%) since the 2018 census, and an increase of 57 people (42.2%) since the 2013 census. There were 105 males and 87 females in 69 dwellings. 1.6% of people identified as LGBTIQ+. The median age was 50.1 years (compared with 38.1 years nationally). There were 30 people (15.6%) aged under 15 years, 24 (12.5%) aged 15 to 29, 90 (46.9%) aged 30 to 64, and 48 (25.0%) aged 65 or older.

People could identify as more than one ethnicity. The results were 92.2% European (Pākehā), 23.4% Māori, 1.6% Pasifika, 1.6% Asian, and 3.1% other, which includes people giving their ethnicity as "New Zealander". English was spoken by 96.9%, Māori by 6.2%, Samoan by 1.6%, and other languages by 6.2%. No language could be spoken by 1.6% (e.g. too young to talk). The percentage of people born overseas was 9.4, compared with 28.8% nationally.

Religious affiliations were 26.6% Christian, and 1.6% Māori religious beliefs. People who answered that they had no religion were 68.8%, and 3.1% of people did not answer the census question.

Of those at least 15 years old, 36 (22.2%) people had a bachelor's or higher degree, 93 (57.4%) had a post-high school certificate or diploma, and 30 (18.5%) people exclusively held high school qualifications. The median income was $33,900, compared with $41,500 nationally. 18 people (11.1%) earned over $100,000 compared to 12.1% nationally. The employment status of those at least 15 was 60 (37.0%) full-time, 30 (18.5%) part-time, and 3 (1.9%) unemployed.

=== Mowhanau statistical area ===
Mowhanau statistical area, which also includes Pākaraka, covers 170.19 km^{2} (65.71 sq mi) and had an estimated population of 1,460 as of June 2025, with a population density of 8.6 people per km^{2}.

Historical population for Mowhanau
Year	Pop.	±% p.a.
2006	1,158	—
2013	1,302	+1.69%
2018	1,293	−0.14%
2023	1,407	+1.70%

Mowhanau had a population of 1,407 in the 2023 New Zealand census, an increase of 114 people (8.8%) since the 2018 census, and an increase of 105 people (8.1%) since the 2013 census. There were 729 males, 675 females, and 3 people of other genders in 522 dwellings. 2.1% of people identified as LGBTIQ+. The median age was 46.1 years (compared with 38.1 years nationally). There were 267 people (19.0%) aged under 15 years, 195 (13.9%) aged 15 to 29, 666 (47.3%) aged 30 to 64, and 276 (19.6%) aged 65 or older.

People could identify as more than one ethnicity. The results were 91.7% European (Pākehā); 16.4% Māori; 1.5% Pasifika; 2.1% Asian; 0.2% Middle Eastern, Latin American and African New Zealanders (MELAA); and 4.3% other, which includes people giving their ethnicity as "New Zealander". English was spoken by 98.3%, Māori by 3.6%, Samoan by 0.2%, and other languages by 4.3%. No language could be spoken by 1.5% (e.g. too young to talk). New Zealand Sign Language was known by 1.1%. The percentage of people born overseas was 11.1, compared with 28.8% nationally.

Religious affiliations were 32.8% Christian, 0.6% Māori religious beliefs, 0.2% Buddhist, 0.4% New Age, and 0.4% other religions. People who answered that they had no religion were 58.8%, and 6.8% of people did not answer the census question.

Of those at least 15 years old, 252 (22.1%) people had a bachelor's or higher degree, 639 (56.1%) had a post-high school certificate or diploma, and 246 (21.6%) people exclusively held high school qualifications. The median income was $41,300, compared with $41,500 nationally. 123 people (10.8%) earned over $100,000 compared to 12.1% nationally. The employment status of those at least 15 was 567 (49.7%) full-time, 198 (17.4%) part-time, and 24 (2.1%) unemployed.

== Marae ==
Kai Iwi has three marae, affiliated with Ngāti Iti and the Ngā Rauru hapū of Ngāti Pūkeko: Te Aroha Marae and Te Kotahitanga meeting house; Kai Iwi Marae and Awhakaueroa meeting house; and Taipake Marae and Taipake meeting house.

In October 2020, the Government committed $522,926 from the Provincial Growth Fund to upgrade Te Ihupuku Marae, Waipapa Marae and Te Aroha Marae, creating 92 jobs.

== Water supply for Whanganui ==
The Kai Iwi area has three artesian bores that are a major source of drinking water for Whanganui.

== Bushy Park Tarapuruhi ==
Bushy Park Tarapuruhi is a protected native forest reserve and bird sanctuary located 8 kilometres (5.0 mi) inland from Kai Iwi on State Highway 3. The reserve has an area of approximately 100 hectares (250 acres), and includes a homestead that is a Category 1 listed historic place.

== Education ==
Kai Iwi School is a co-educational state primary school for Year 1 to 8 students, with a roll of 96 as of July 2026. The school opened in 1876.
