= Archie Taiaroa =

New Zealand Māori leader (1937–2010)

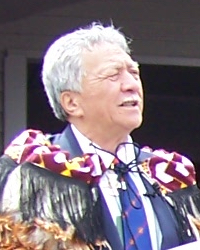
Taiaroa in 2009

Sir Archie John Te Atawhai Taiaroa KNZM (3 January 1937 – 21 September 2010) was a New Zealand Māori leader who affiliated to the Ngāti Tūwharetoa, Te Āti Haunui-a-Pāpārangi, Ngāti Apa and Ngāti Maru iwi. He chaired the Whanganui River Maori Trust Board and Te Ohu Kaimoana, the latter for five years. He lived for a long time at Taumarunui, where he was a borough councillor and deputy mayor.

Taiaroa was born at Tawatā (Tawhata), on the Whanganui River, about 40 kilometres by road south-west of Taumarunui. He had an older brother, Raymond Te Rumana (Lofty) Taiaroa. He attended Tawata School, St Patrick's Convent School in Taumarunui, Hato Paora College near Feilding and the University of Canterbury. He married Martha Turner, of a leading Ngāti Tūwharetoa family, in 1965 and they had a son, Te Hokowhitu-a-Rākeipoho Taiaroa, known as Rākeipoho Taiaroa.

He died of a stroke in Hamilton on 21 September 2010. He was buried at Poumaanu urupā (cemetery) at Tawatā.

== Awards and honours ==
In the 2003 Queen's Birthday Honours, Taiaroa was appointed a Distinguished Companion of the New Zealand Order of Merit, for services to Māori. Following the reintroduction of titular honours by the New Zealand government, he accepted re-designation as a Knight Companion of the New Zealand Order of Merit in the 2009 Special Honours. In November 2024 Te Whare o Rehua Sarjeant Gallery in Whanganui re-opened with a new wing dedicated to Taiaroa named Te Pātaka o Tā Te Atawhai Archie John Taiaroa. The naming of the new wing was to honour Taiaroa's legacy and commitment to collective action.
