= Ātene =

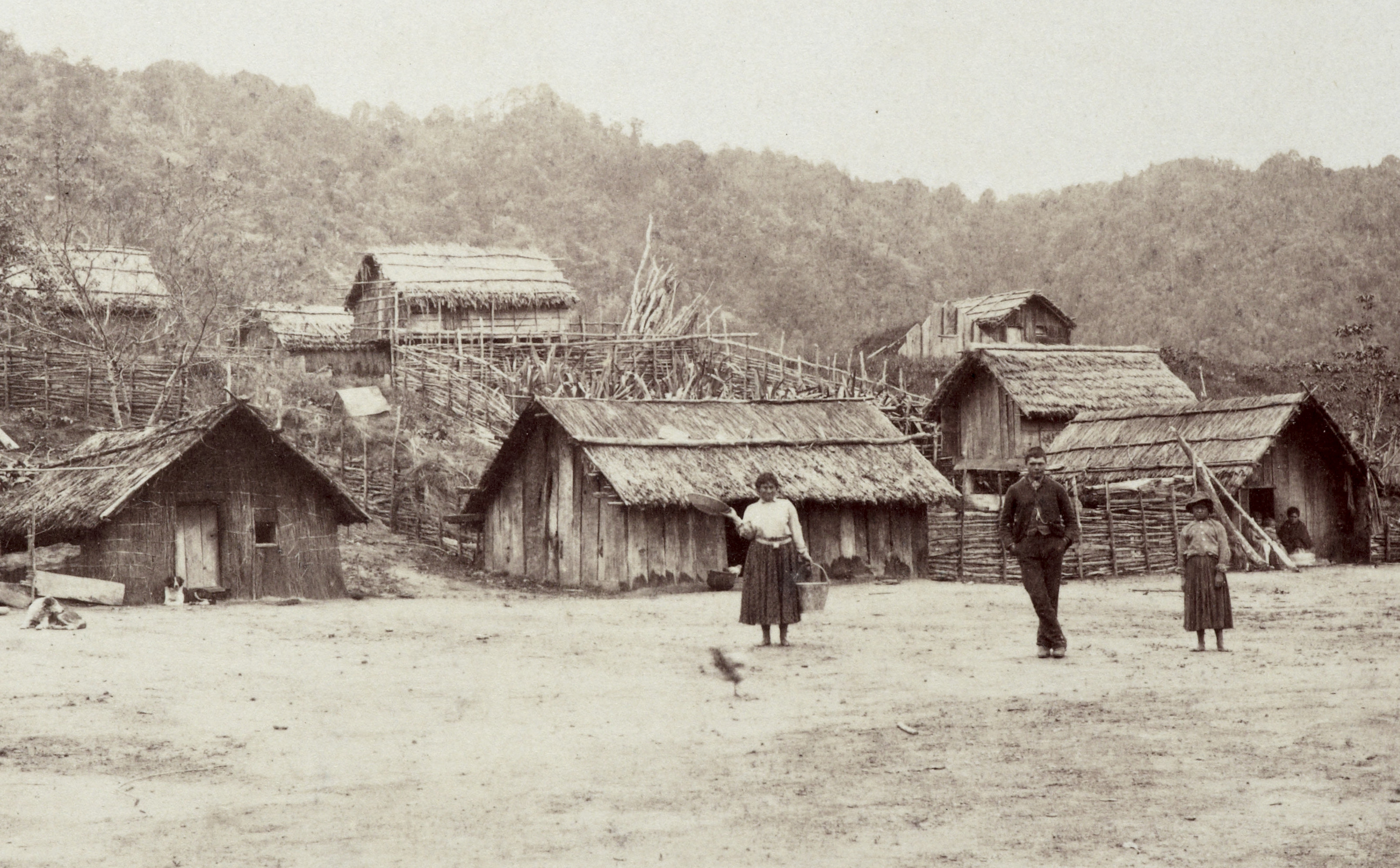
Ātene, Whanganui River, c. 1890. Photo by Wrigglesworth and Binns.

Ātene is a former village located 35 km (22 miles) up the Whanganui River from Whanganui. Originally called Warepakoko, then Kakata, it was renamed by the missionary Richard Taylor in the 19th century as a Māori transliteration of Athens. It was the home of the hapū Ngāti Hineoneone of the iwi Te Āti Haunui-a-Pāpārangi. A small meeting house called Te Rangi-i-heke-iho, restored by carver Bill Ranginui, is all that remains.

The hill next to Ātene, Puketapu, was once on a peninsula almost completely surrounded by a meander of the Whanganui River; centuries ago the river broke through the neck of the peninsula, connecting the two bends and cutting off the meander. In the 1960s, a hydroelectric dam was proposed at Ātene, because the meander could have been reinstated while the dam was being constructed. A hydroelectric dam would have flooded the river as far back as Taumarunui, and the project was abandoned. While investigating the possibility of a dam, the Ministry of Works built a road in 1959 along the ridgeline overlooking Puketapu. The road is now an 18 km walking track, the Ātene Skyline Track.
