= Ngāti Hinekura =

Ngāti Hinekura may refer to:

- A sub-tribe of Ngāi Tūhoe and Ngāti Ruapani in the Waikaremoana area
- A sub-tribe of Ngāti Pikiao in the Bay of Plenty
- A sub-tribe of Te Korowai o Wainuiārua in the Whanganui River area
