= Kakatahi =

- Interactive map of Kakatahi
- Coordinates: 39.653823°S 175.328622°E
- Country: New Zealand
- Region: Manawatū-Whanganui
- District: Whanganui District
- Community: Whanganui Rural Community
- Electorates: Whanganui; Te Tai Hauāuru (Māori)

Government
  - Territorial Authority: Whanganui District Council
  - Regional council: Horizons Regional Council
  - Mayor of Whanganui: Andrew Tripe
  - Whanganui MP: Carl Bates
  - Te Tai Hauāuru MP: Debbie Ngarewa-Packer

Area
  - Total: 541.09 km^{2} (208.92 sq mi)

Population (2023 Census)
  - Total: 228
  - Density: 0.421/km^{2} (1.09/sq mi)
- Time zone: UTC+12 (NZST)
  - Summer (DST): UTC+13 (NZDT)
- Area code: 06

Kākātahi is a New Zealand town located 50 kilometres (31 mi) from Whanganui, on State Highway 4 to Raetihi. The once bustling roadworkers' camp is now closed and the introduction of private contractors has seen the community dwindle, with local families contributing to a school roll of only about a dozen in 2007.

The local Ōtoko Pā is a meeting place for korowai o Te Awaiti. who is a group of hāpu known as: Ngāti Hine-o-te-rā, Ngāti Rūwai, and Ngāti Waikārapu Sometimes just known as Te Awaiti or Te Awa Iti.

On the pā, there is a Wharenui called Tauakirā and Kākātahi School

== Demographics ==
Kakatahi locality covers 541.09 km^{2} (208.92 sq mi). It is part of the larger Upper Whanganui statistical area.

Historical population
Year	Pop.	±% p.a.
2013	246	—
2018	213	−2.84%
2023	228	+1.37%

Kakatahi had a population of 228 in the 2023 New Zealand census, an increase of 15 people (7.0%) since the 2018 census, and a decrease of 18 people (−7.3%) since the 2013 census. There were 129 males and 99 females in 102 dwellings. There were 45 people (19.7%) aged under 15 years, 48 (21.1%) aged 15 to 29, 105 (46.1%) aged 30 to 64, and 30 (13.2%) aged 65 or older.

People could identify as more than one ethnicity. The results were 82.9% European (Pākehā); 28.9% Māori; 1.3% Pasifika; 1.3% Middle Eastern, Latin American and African New Zealanders (MELAA); and 2.6% other, which includes people giving their ethnicity as "New Zealander". English was spoken by 97.4%, Māori by 10.5%, Samoan by 1.3%, and other languages by 2.6%. No language could be spoken by 3.9% (e.g. too young to talk). The percentage of people born overseas was 9.2, compared with 28.8% nationally.

Religious affiliations were 25.0% Christian, 5.3% Māori religious beliefs, and 1.3% other religions. People who answered that they had no religion were 64.5%, and 2.6% of people did not answer the census question.

Of those at least 15 years old, 18 (9.8%) people had a bachelor's or higher degree, 108 (59.0%) had a post-high school certificate or diploma, and 45 (24.6%) people exclusively held high school qualifications. 12 people (6.6%) earned over $100,000 compared to 12.1% nationally. The employment status of those at least 15 was 111 (60.7%) full-time, 27 (14.8%) part-time, and 6 (3.3%) unemployed.

== Education ==
Kākātahi School is a co-educational state primary school for Year 1 to 8 students, with a roll of 14 as of July 2026. It opened in 1934 but with predecessors from 1913. A new school was built in 1963.

Ngamatea School was a co-educational state primary school for Year 1 to 8 students southeast of Kakatahi. It opened in 1915 as Te Pou School, and closed in 2017.
