= Moutoa Island =

Island in the Whanganui River, New Zealand

Coordinates: 39.578°S 175.090°E

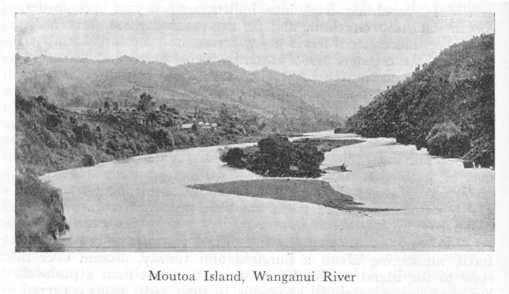

Moutoa Island is an island of shingle approximately 500 metres (1,600 ft) long, 80 kilometres (50 mi) up the Whanganui River, New Zealand between the towns of Rānana and Hiruharama.

Surrounded by rapids, it has been the site of many battles, the most famous being on 14 May 1864, between a force of Pai Mārire followers from the upper Whanganui and Ngāti Hau from the lower Whanganui, during the Second Taranaki War. A statue unveiled in 1865 in Moutoa Gardens in Whanganui commemorates the battle.
