= Baibai =

Baibai may refer to:

- Baibai language, a language of Papua New Guinea
- Apisai Driu Baibai (born 1970), Fijian sprinter

== See also ==
- Paipai (disambiguation)
- Pabai
