= Okoia =

- Interactive map of Okoia
- Coordinates: 39°56′S 175°08′E
- Country: New Zealand
- Region: Manawatū-Whanganui
- District: Whanganui District
- Community: Whanganui Rural Community
- Electorates: Whanganui; Te Tai Hauāuru (Māori)

Government
  - Territorial Authority: Whanganui District Council
  - Regional council: Horizons Regional Council
  - Mayor of Whanganui: Andrew Tripe
  - Whanganui MP: Carl Bates
  - Te Tai Hauāuru MP: Debbie Ngarewa-Packer

Area
  - Total: 97.37 km^{2} (37.59 sq mi)

Population (2023 Census)
  - Total: 414
  - Density: 4.25/km^{2} (11.0/sq mi)

Okoia is a small rural community approximately 5 km east of Whanganui, New Zealand. It is centred on the Okoia Primary School and village. The area is predominantly subject to sheep and beef pastoral farming, but in recent years some farms have been divided into lifestyle blocks.

The local Kauangāroa Marae and Kimihia te Maramatanga meeting house, 20 km away on the Whangaehu river, are a meeting place for the local Māori iwi of Ngāti Apa.

== Demographics ==
Okoia locality covers 97.37 km^{2} (37.59 sq mi). It is part of the larger Kaitoke-Fordell statistical area.

Historical population
Year	Pop.	±% p.a.
2006	306	—
2013	342	+1.60%
2018	357	+0.86%
2023	414	+3.01%

Okoia had a population of 414 in the 2023 New Zealand census, an increase of 57 people (16.0%) since the 2018 census, and an increase of 72 people (21.1%) since the 2013 census. There were 210 males and 204 females in 144 dwellings. 2.2% of people identified as LGBTIQ+. There were 84 people (20.3%) aged under 15 years, 69 (16.7%) aged 15 to 29, 198 (47.8%) aged 30 to 64, and 57 (13.8%) aged 65 or older.

People could identify as more than one ethnicity. The results were 92.0% European (Pākehā), 15.2% Māori, 0.7% Pasifika, 4.3% Asian, and 4.3% other, which includes people giving their ethnicity as "New Zealander". English was spoken by 97.8%, Māori by 2.9%, and other languages by 3.6%. No language could be spoken by 2.2% (e.g. too young to talk). New Zealand Sign Language was known by 2.2%. The percentage of people born overseas was 9.4, compared with 28.8% nationally.

Religious affiliations were 28.3% Christian, 0.7% Islam, 0.7% Māori religious beliefs, and 1.4% Buddhist. People who answered that they had no religion were 58.0%, and 10.1% of people did not answer the census question.

Of those at least 15 years old, 54 (16.4%) people had a bachelor's or higher degree, 198 (60.0%) had a post-high school certificate or diploma, and 84 (25.5%) people exclusively held high school qualifications. 30 people (9.1%) earned over $100,000 compared to 12.1% nationally. The employment status of those at least 15 was 174 (52.7%) full-time, 51 (15.5%) part-time, and 9 (2.7%) unemployed.

== Education ==
Okoia School is a co-educational state primary school for Year 1 to 8 students, with a roll of 52 as of July 2026. It opened in 1876.
