= Ranana =

Coordinates: 39.583°S 175.107°E

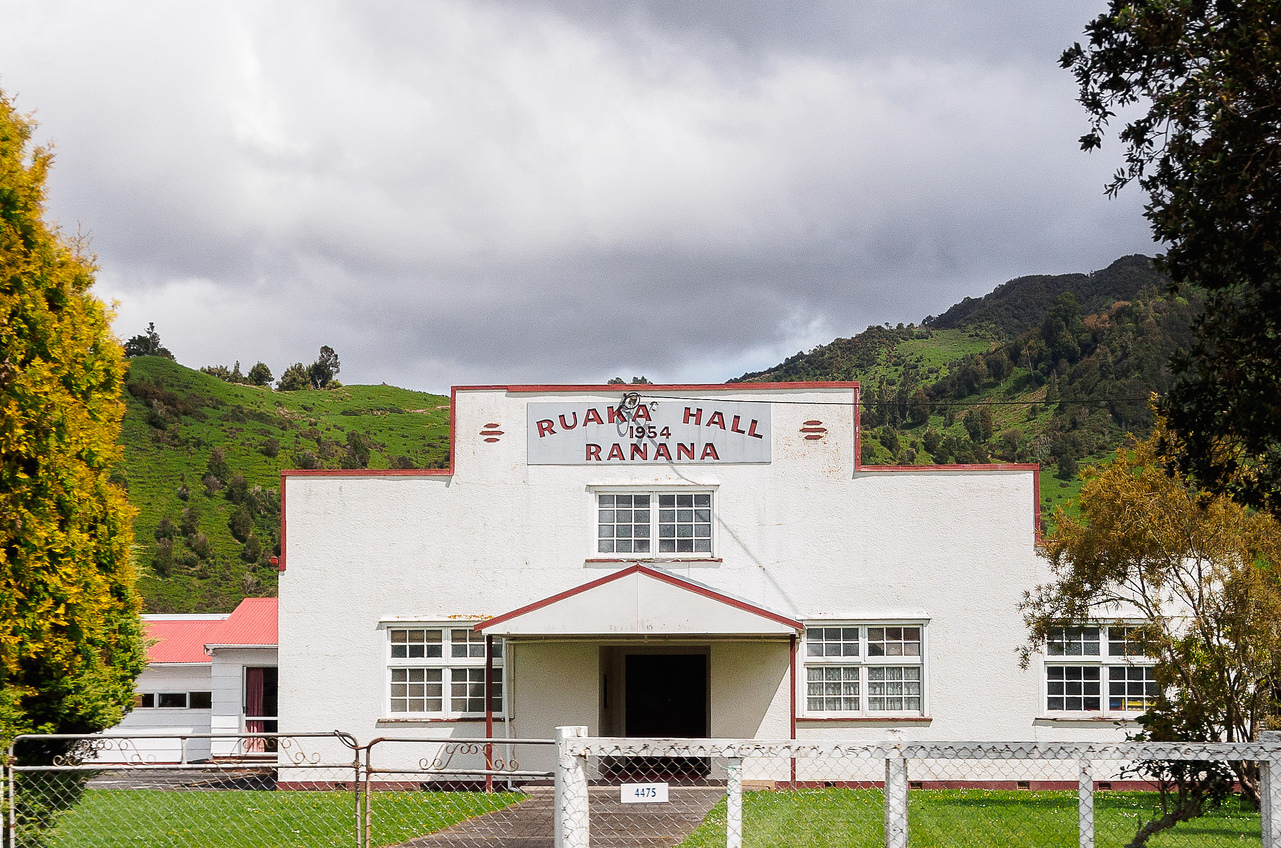
The Ruaka Hall at Ranana, Whanganui River, New Zealand

Ranana is a settlement 60 kilometres (37 mi) up the Whanganui River from Whanganui, New Zealand.

Originally known as Kauika, it grew after 1848 as local Māori moved out of fortified pā settlements in peacetime. It was renamed by the missionary Richard Taylor in 1856 for Rānana, a Māori transliteration of London. The town's Catholic church, built in the 1880s for the hapū Ngāti Ruakā of the iwi Te Āti Haunui-a-Pāpārangi, is still in use. Nearby is Moutoa Island, site of a famous battle in 1864.

Ngāti Ruakā and Ngāti Hine Korako have two traditional meeting grounds in Ranana: the Rānana or Ruakā Marae and Te Morehu meeting house, and Te Pou o Rongo Marae and Tūmanako meeting house.

== Education ==
Te Kura o Te Wainui-ā-Rua is a co-educational state primary school for Year 1 to 8 students, with a roll of 51 as of March 2026. Ranana School opened in 1949. Pipiriki and Parikino schools merged with it in 2006, and Whanganui Area School was formed. This became Te Wainui-ā-Rua, and changed its name to Te Kura o Te Wainui-ā-Rua in 2021.
