= Ngapuke =

Village in King Country, New Zealand

- Town
- Interactive map of Ngapuke
- Coordinates: 38.885885°S 175.417032°E
- Country: New Zealand
- Region: Manawatū-Whanganui
- District: Ruapehu District
- Ward: Ruapehu General Ward; Ruapehu Māori Ward
- Community: Taumarunui-Ōhura Community
- Electorates: Whanganui; Te Tai Hauāuru (Māori)

Government
  - Territorial Authority: Ruapehu District Council
  - Regional council: Horizons Regional Council
  - Mayor of Ruapehu: Weston Kirton
  - Whanganui MP: Carl Bates
  - Te Tai Hauāuru MP: Debbie Ngarewa-Packer

Area
  - Total: 142.62 km^{2} (55.07 sq mi)

Population (2023 census)
  - Total: 168
  - Density: 1.18/km^{2} (3.05/sq mi)

Ngapuke or Ngāpuke is a village and rural community in the Ruapehu district and Manawatū-Whanganui region of New Zealand's North Island. It is located on the south side of the valley of Pungapunga River, a tributary of the upper Whanganui River, east of Taumarunui and west of Tongariro and Kuratau on State Highway 41.

In 1920, the settlement was a logging town for local forests. Since the 1950s it has been a farming community and outlying satellite town of Taumarunui.

The New Zealand Ministry for Culture and Heritage gives a translation of "the hills" for Ngāpuke.

== Marae ==
The Kauriki Marae and Te Ōhākī meeting house is a tribal meeting place for the Ngāti Tūwharetoa hapū of Ngāti Hinemihi and Ngāti Turumakina.

In October 2020, the Government committed $1,560,379 from the Provincial Growth Fund to upgrade the marae and 7 other nearby marae, creating 156 jobs.

Maniaiti Marae is also located nearby.

== Demographics ==
Ngapuke locality covers 142.62 km^{2} (55.07 sq mi) It is part of the larger Ngapuke statistical area.

Historical population for the locality
Year	Pop.	±% p.a.
2006	159	—
2013	159	+0.00%
2018	165	+0.74%
2023	168	+0.36%

Ngapuke locality had a population of 168 in the 2023 New Zealand census, an increase of 3 people (1.8%) since the 2018 census, and an increase of 9 people (5.7%) since the 2013 census. There were 84 males and 84 females in 63 dwellings. The median age was 42.3 years (compared with 38.1 years nationally). There were 33 people (19.6%) aged under 15 years, 30 (17.9%) aged 15 to 29, 78 (46.4%) aged 30 to 64, and 30 (17.9%) aged 65 or older.

People could identify as more than one ethnicity. The results were 85.7% European (Pākehā), 35.7% Māori, 3.6% Pasifika, and 1.8% Asian. English was spoken by 98.2%, Māori by 5.4%, and other languages by 1.8%. No language could be spoken by 3.6% (e.g. too young to talk). New Zealand Sign Language was known by 1.8%. The percentage of people born overseas was 5.4, compared with 28.8% nationally.

Religious affiliations were 30.4% Christian, and 1.8% other religions. People who answered that they had no religion were 64.3%, and 5.4% of people did not answer the census question.

Of those at least 15 years old, 9 (6.7%) people had a bachelor's or higher degree, 84 (62.2%) had a post-high school certificate or diploma, and 33 (24.4%) people exclusively held high school qualifications. The median income was $46,200, compared with $41,500 nationally. 9 people (6.7%) earned over $100,000 compared to 12.1% nationally. The employment status of those at least 15 was 78 (57.8%) full-time and 18 (13.3%) part-time.

=== Ngapuke statistical area ===
Ngapuke statistical area, which surrounds but does not include Taumarunui, covers 621.83 km^{2} (240.09 sq mi) and had an estimated population of 1,400 as of June 2025, with a population density of 2.3 people per km^{2}.

Historical population for the statistical area
Year	Pop.	±% p.a.
2006	1,356	—
2013	1,296	−0.64%
2018	1,263	−0.51%
2023	1,353	+1.39%

Ngapuke had a population of 1,353 in the 2023 New Zealand census, an increase of 90 people (7.1%) since the 2018 census, and an increase of 57 people (4.4%) since the 2013 census. There were 696 males, 654 females, and 3 people of other genders in 540 dwellings. 2.0% of people identified as LGBTIQ+. The median age was 45.3 years (compared with 38.1 years nationally). There were 258 people (19.1%) aged under 15 years, 198 (14.6%) aged 15 to 29, 609 (45.0%) aged 30 to 64, and 288 (21.3%) aged 65 or older.

People could identify as more than one ethnicity. The results were 73.6% European (Pākehā); 43.5% Māori; 2.7% Pasifika; 3.1% Asian; 0.4% Middle Eastern, Latin American and African New Zealanders (MELAA); and 2.2% other, which includes people giving their ethnicity as "New Zealander". English was spoken by 96.9%, Māori by 8.2%, and other languages by 2.4%. No language could be spoken by 2.2% (e.g. too young to talk). New Zealand Sign Language was known by 0.4%. The percentage of people born overseas was 6.9, compared with 28.8% nationally.

Religious affiliations were 31.0% Christian, 0.2% Hindu, 0.2% Islam, 2.7% Māori religious beliefs, 0.2% Buddhist, 0.2% Jewish, and 1.6% other religions. People who answered that they had no religion were 55.4%, and 8.9% of people did not answer the census question.

Of those at least 15 years old, 114 (10.4%) people had a bachelor's or higher degree, 633 (57.8%) had a post-high school certificate or diploma, and 354 (32.3%) people exclusively held high school qualifications. The median income was $37,200, compared with $41,500 nationally. 78 people (7.1%) earned over $100,000 compared to 12.1% nationally. The employment status of those at least 15 was 555 (50.7%) full-time, 162 (14.8%) part-time, and 33 (3.0%) unemployed.

== Education ==
Te Kura o Ngapuke is a co-educational Māori language immersion state primary school for Year 1 to 8 students, with a roll of 15 as of July 2026.

The school was established in 1916 and celebrated its centenary in 2016 with an inter-generational game of Kī-o-rahi.

In recent years, the school has transitioned from English language mainstream schooling, to a Kuri a Iwi schooling model, in which children are taught in te reo Māori and connected to their ancestor.
