= Parikino =

Settlement upriver from Whanganui, New Zealand

Coordinates: 39°48′S 175°09′E

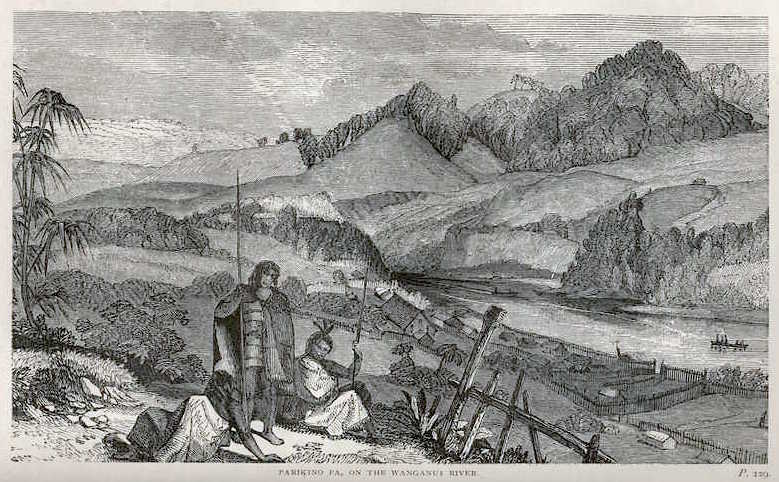
Parikino pā, on the Whanganui River, after a sketch by Rev. Richard Taylor

Parikino is a settlement 24 kilometres (15 mi) upriver from Whanganui, New Zealand; the original pā site was across the Whanganui River.

Parikino was originally a fortified settlement established in 1845 as security against a possible raid by a Ngāti Tūwharetoa taua (war party). The population of about 200 then gradually moved to the unfortified agricultural land across the river. Parikino is home to the Ngāti Hinearo and Ngāti Tuera hapū of the iwi Te Āti Haunui-a-Pāpārangi. The Ngāti Hinearo wharenui is called Te Aroha, and the Ngāti Tuera is Wharewhiti. The meeting house Maranganui Tuarua, 3 km south of Parikino at Pungarehu, was built for Ngāti Tuera by the carver Hōri Pukehika.

Parikino Sports Day, consisting mainly of horseback competitions and family activities, has run every year since 1928; farm chores are traditionally put on hold for the day.

One of New Zealand's most important contemporary photographers Ans Westra took a series of black-and-white photographs of children and teachers at the Parikino Maori School in 1963.

There are three marae in the Parikino area. Parikino Marae and Ko Wharewhiti or Te Aroha meeting house are a meeting place for Ngāti Hinearo and Ngāti Tumango. Ātene or Kakata Marae and Te Rangi-i-heke-iho meeting house are affiliated with Ngāti Hineoneone. Pungarehu Marae and Maranganui Tuarua meeting house are affiliated with Ngāti Tuera.

== Education ==
Aberfeldy School is a co-educational state primary school for Year 1 to 8 students, with a roll of 14 as of July 2026. It opened in 1903.

Parikino School opened in 1874. It closed and merged with Pipiriki and Ranana Schools in 2006 to form Whanganui Area School.
