= Matahiwi =

Farming community in New Zealand

Coordinates: 39°36′24″S 175°09′52″E

Matahiwi is a farming community 55 kilometres (34 mi) upriver from Whanganui, New Zealand, home to the Māori hapū known as Ngā Poutama of the iwi Te Āti Haunui-a-Pāpārangi. The township takes its name from the bush-clad puke (hill) on the western side of the Whanganui River, right above the local marae, whose name translates as "the face on the ridge" (mata, face; hiwi, ridge).

== History and culture ==
=== Early settlement ===
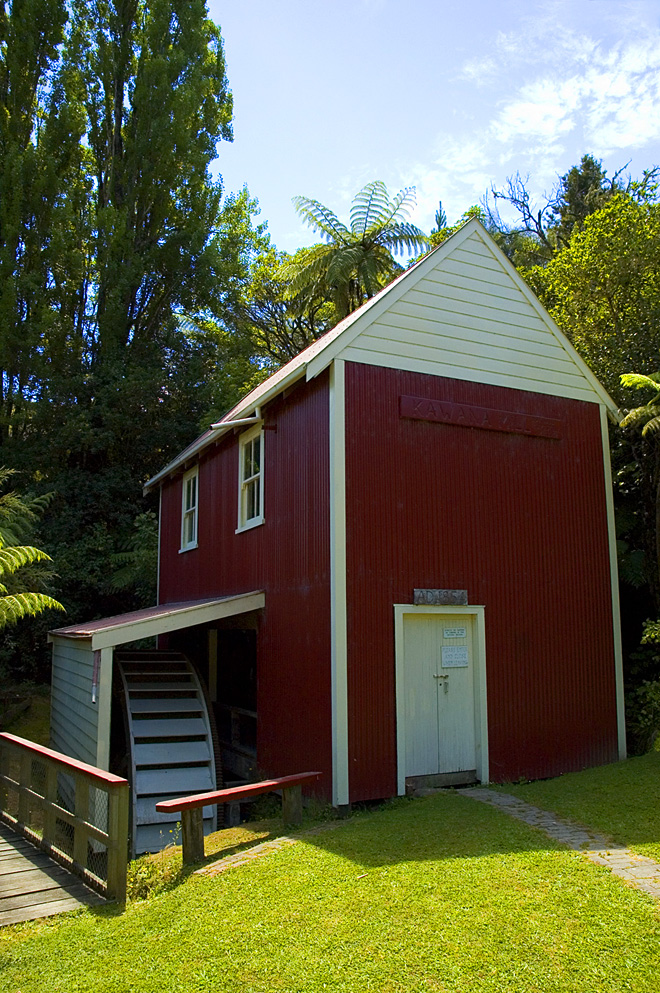
Kawana flour mill, 1854 (restored), Matahiwi

The original settlement of Ngā Poutama was across the river at Hikurangi (also known as Poutama). In the 1840s it had a population of about 200. Hikurangi was renamed in 1850 with the biblical name Karatia (Galatia), often spelled Karatea. That settlement is now deserted; the urupa (burial ground) is still known as Hikurangi.

The Kawana flour mill at Matahiwi was named in honour of Governor George Grey, who had donated the millstones as a personal gift to the Ngā Poutama people. It operated for over 50 years from 1854 and was restored in 1980.

Matahiwi was a way station for the paddle steamers that were the main transportation up the Whanganui River before the building of the road. The remains of the sternwheeler Tuhua that grounded in 1890 are on the far side of Moutere Island.

=== Modern settlement ===
Matahiwi is predominantly a sheep and beef farming area, much of it under management of Atihau-Whanganui Incorporation, which was established in 1970 to farm 101,000 acres of land vested into the Aotea Maori Land Council by Whanganui Māori between 1902 and 1904.

=== Marae ===
There are three marae in the Matahiwi area. Maranganui Marae and Tuarua meeting house ar affiliated with Ngāti Tuera. Matahiwi or Ohotu Marae and Tānewai meeting house are affiliated with Ngā Poutama and Ngāti Tānewai. Waitahupārae Marae and Waitahupārae meeting house are affiliated with Ngāti Patutokotoko.

The present-day Matahiwi or Ohotu Marae was established by Maehe Ranginui in 1902. His daughter Te Kehu, noting its similarity to the one they had left behind in Karatia, shed tears (wai) in the presence of her husband (tāne) Nikorima; the wharepuni (sleeping house) is thus known as Tānewai (a name also linked with the founder of Hikurangi).
