= Tieke Kāinga =

Maōri community in New Zealand

Coordinates: 39°20′15″S 174°59′35″E

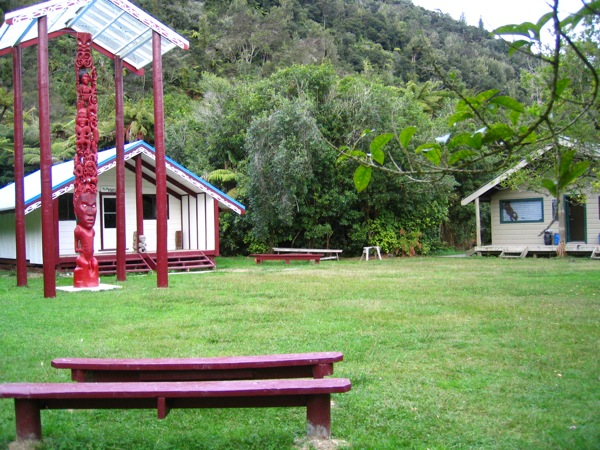
Tieke marae, with carved pole and wharenui at left and Department of Conservation hut at right

Tieke Kāinga is a small Māori community in New Zealand, on the middle reaches of the Whanganui River 2.5 kilometres (1.6 mi) downstream from the mouth of the Mangatiti Stream. It is centred on Tieke Marae, and a Department of Conservation tramping hut. The surrounding land is subject to a Māori land claim that began with occupation of an earlier hut in 1993.

== History ==
Prior to European colonisation, Tieke was a Whanganui River trading centre, a place of learning and a fortified pā. In 1841 it was described by Wakefield as a large settlement (perhaps 80–90 inhabitants). In the 1840s it shifted across the river and changed its name to Te Ririatepo, but by 1851 it had shifted back and was known as Okirihau, with a population of 93. The area was part of the government's 1886 Waimarino Purchase, which was intended to allow sale of land to settlers, and the chief Te Rangihuatau who lived at Tieke assisted with the purchase. However, there was confusion over whether Tieke itself was included. Te Rangihuatau considered it to be Māori land; the government considered it "Crown Lands which the Natives are allowed to use and occupy without a title". Early in the 20th century the land changed from tribal to government ownership, although no official records of the 1906 Whanganui River Trust transaction exist today. In 1908 Te Rangihuatau died and the settlement was abandoned.

The land surrounding Tieke became scenic reserve, and the Wanganui River Scenic Board built a hut there in the late 1950s or early 1960s. Tieke became part of the Whanganui National Park when it was created in 1986. The Department of Conservation built a large hut there as part of a series of facilities they provided along the river. In the mid-1990s the Department of Conservation began levying a Facilities Use Pass, a toll on river users to maintain its huts and services, which caused controversy amongst some local Māori. In September 1993 a group called Te Whānau o Tieke reclaimed the land, occupying the hut and establishing a marae. In 2001 the group made a memorandum of understanding with the Department of Conservation, who built a bigger hut and permitted the group to erect a wharenui (meeting house) and a carved pole. The wharenui was completed in 2003.

== Current inhabitants ==
Today Tieke Kāinga is home to an extended family, Te Whānau o Tieke, also known as Tamahaki after the name of their common ancestor, whose members trace their ancestry to pre-European Tieke. The marae serves as a popular stop-off point for tourists canoeing the Whanganui River (part of the Whanganui Journey). Another camping site, Ramanui, sits nearby on the opposite bank of the river.

Whilst the land is still formally disputed, the Department of Conservation and the Te Whānau o Tieke have developed an amicable and co-operative relationship, working together to upgrade and maintain facilities at Tieke Kāinga.
