= Mārama =

Mārama was most likely a Māori woman possibly from the Te Rarawa iwi (tribe) in northern New Zealand.

Mārama signed the Treaty of Waitangi on 28 April 1840 in Kaitaia, and is believed to be one of the few women to have signed the treaty.
