= Kāwana Pitiroi Paipai =

New Zealand Māori leader (died 1884)

Kāwana Pitiroi Paipai (? – 11 June 1884) was a New Zealand tohunga, military leader and assessor. Of Māori descent, he identified with the Ngāti Ruaka and Te Ati Haunui-a-Paparangi iwi.
