= Jean Lampila =

French missionary (1808–1897)

Jean Lampila (24 October 1808 – 14 February 1897) was a New Zealand missionary. He was born in Mazamet, France. Lampila joined the Society of Mary in 1840.
