= Richard Taylor (missionary) =

English priest (1805–1873)

Richard Taylor FGS
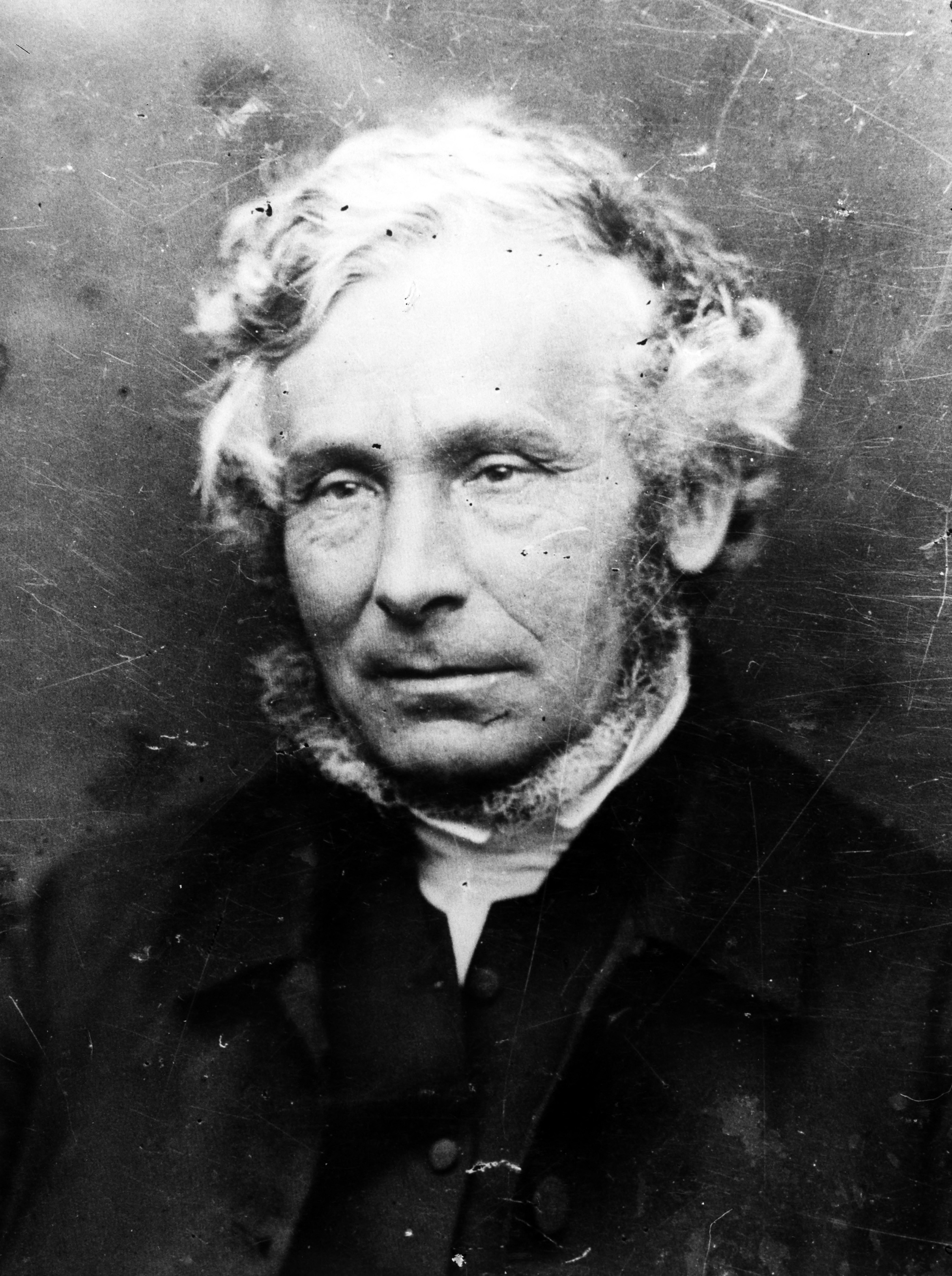
- The Reverend Richard Taylor
- Born: 21 March 1805; Letwell, Yorkshire, England
- Died: 10 October 1873 (aged 68); Whanganui, New Zealand
- Occupation: Missionary
- Spouse: Mary Catherine Fox (married 1829)

Richard Taylor FGS (21 March 1805 – 10 October 1873) was a Church Missionary Society (CMS) missionary in New Zealand. He was born on 21 March 1805 at Letwell, Yorkshire, England, one of four children of Richard Taylor and his wife, Catherine Spencer.

He attended Queens' College, Cambridge and after graduating BA in 1828, he was ordained as a priest on 8 November 1829. In 1835, he was conferred MA and appointed a missionary in New Zealand for the CMS.

== Church Missionary Society ==
Taylor was present at the signing of the Treaty of Waitangi on 6 February 1840. In 1840, he was appointed as head of the school at Te Waimate mission, then in 1842 posted to the CMS mission station at Whanganui. By 1844, the brick church built by the Revd John Mason was inadequate to meet the needs of the congregation and it had been damaged in an earthquake. A new church was built under the supervision of the Revd Richard Taylor with the timber supplied by each pā on the river in proportion to its size and number of Christians. His travels as a missionary extended into the Taranaki and Taupō regions to the north of Whanganui. In March 1846 he hosted Governor George Grey when he visited Whanganui.

In 1848, Taylor wrote A Leaf from the Natural History of New Zealand (1848).

In 1849, he travelled back to Whanganui via Taupō from meeting of CMS missionaries in Tauranga. His missionary travels include travelling up the Whanganui River to settlements such as Pipiriki and to Lake Rotoaira at the base of Mount Tongariro. He named settlements along the Whanganui River Ātene (Athens), Koriniti (Corinth), Hiruhārama (Jerusalem) and Rānana (London) and the Wanganui suburb of Taylorville is named after him.

After his death on 19 October 1873, his son, the Revd Basil Kirke Taylor, took over the Whanganui mission.

He wrote numerous books about the natural and cultural environment of New Zealand in his time.

== Gallery ==
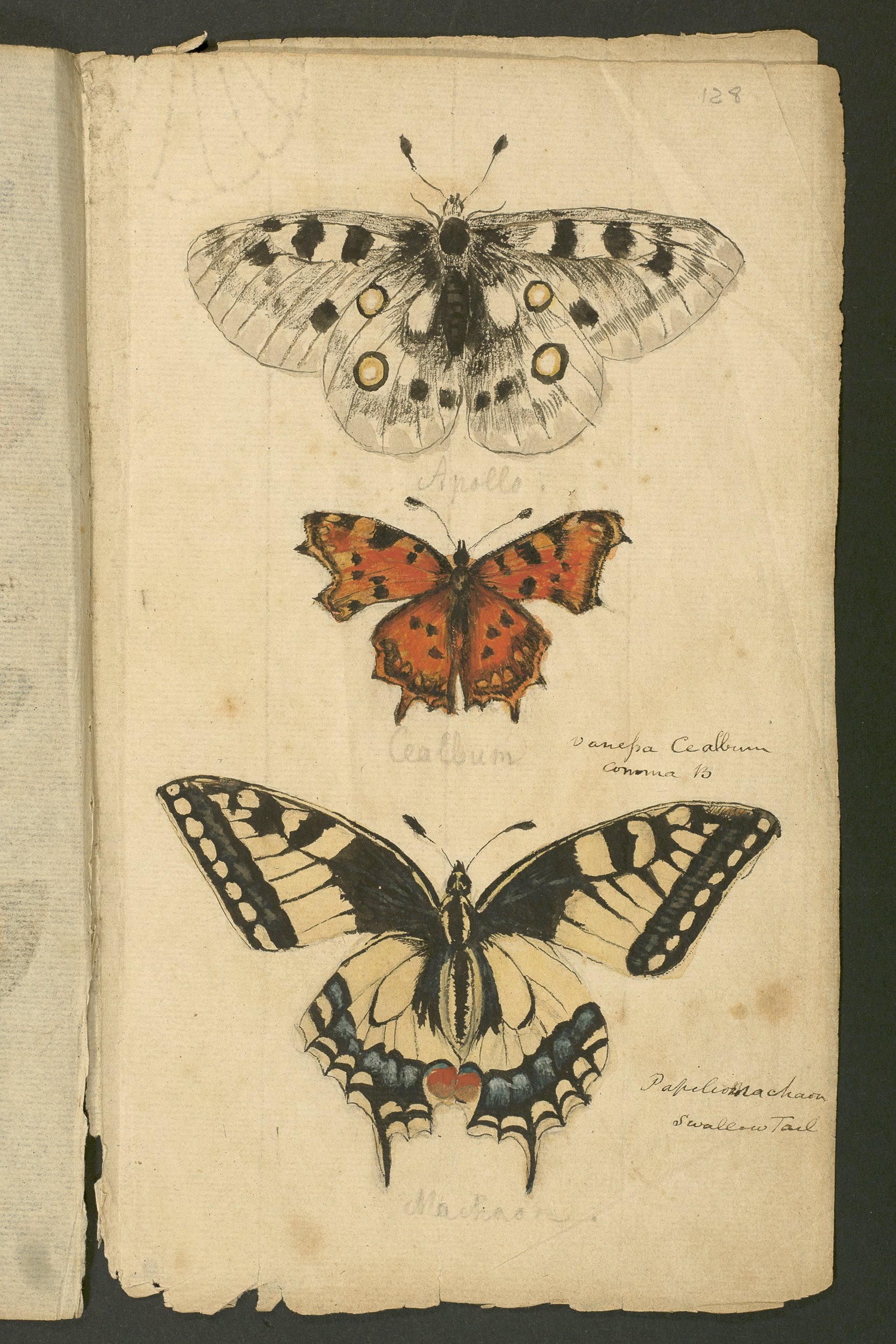
Illustrations of Apollo, Polygonia c-album and a Swallowtail butterfly

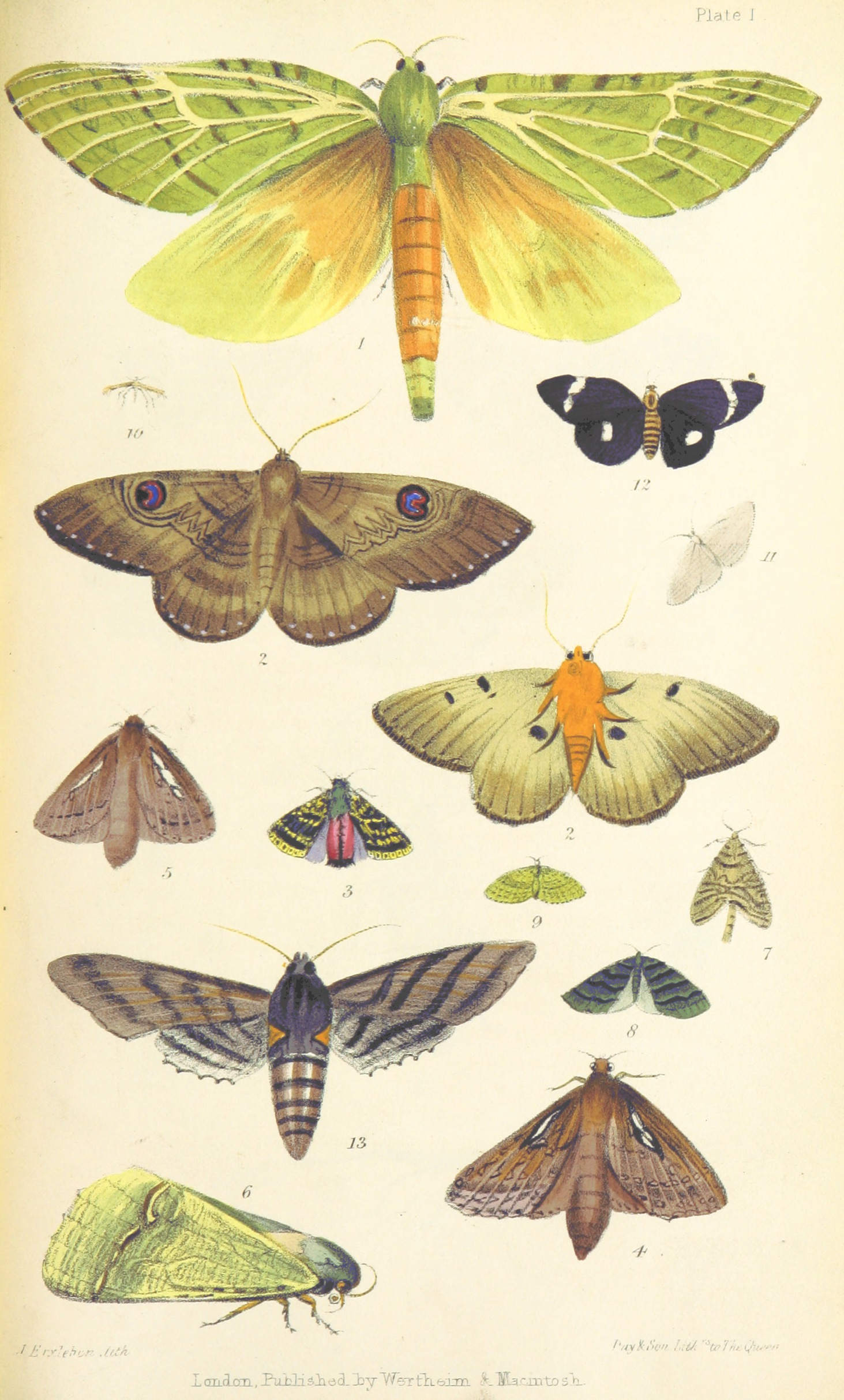
Plate 1 of Te Ika a Maui.

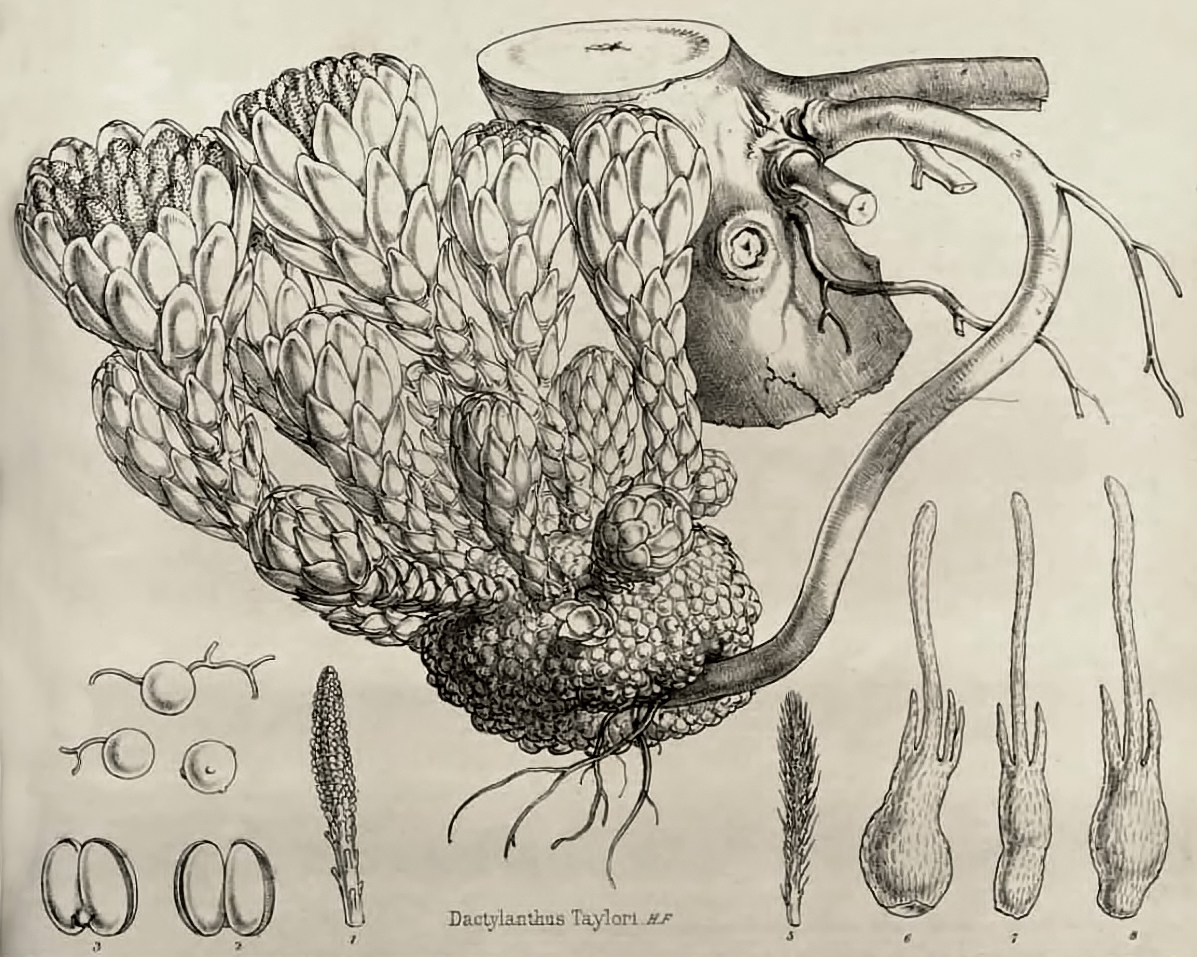
Dactylanthus taylorii named after its discoverer, Richard Taylor.

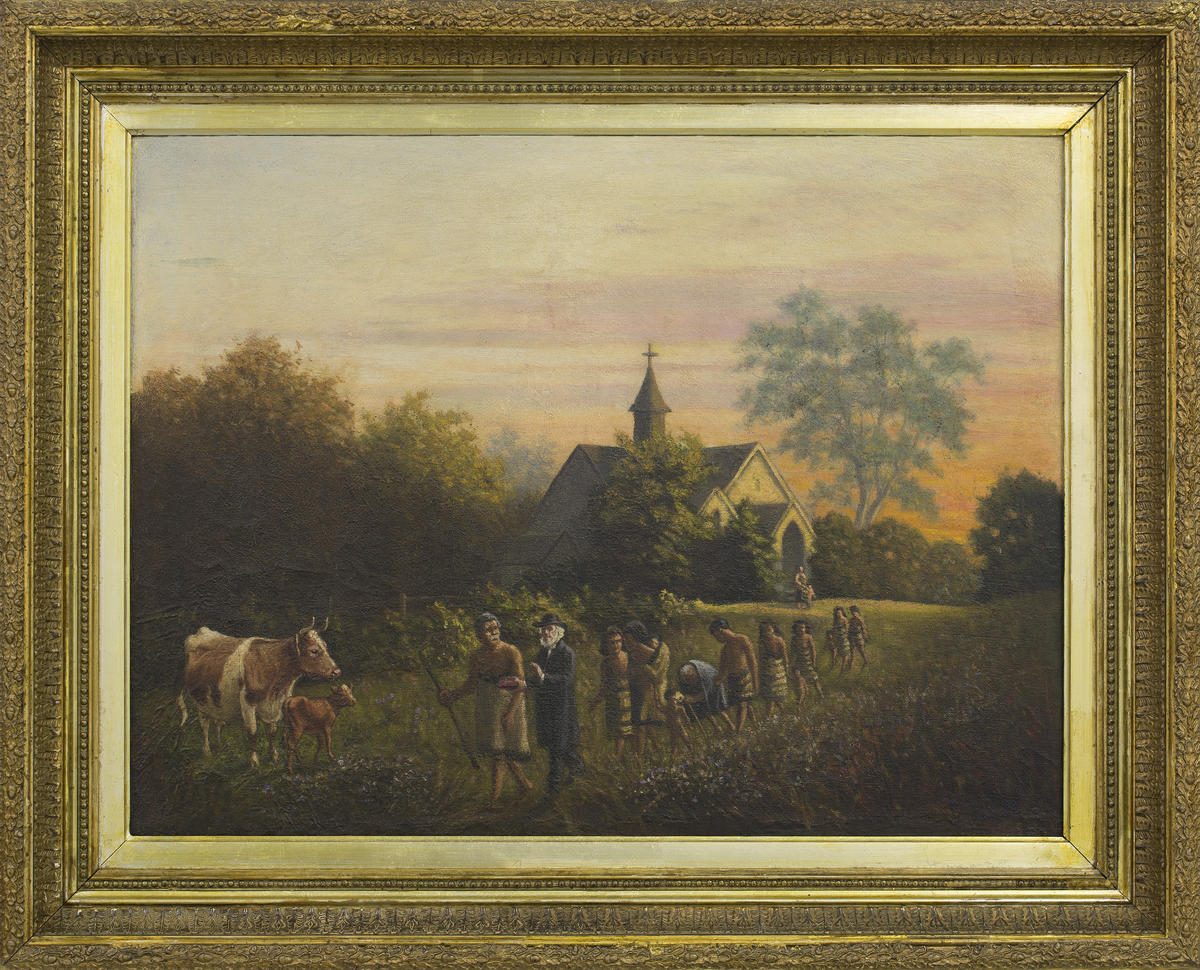
The Rev Richard Taylor with Hoani Wiremu Hīpango and family walking by the third Putiki Mission church.
Artist: George Sherriff

== Works ==
- Taylor, Richard (1848). A Leaf from the Natural History of New Zealand. Wellington: Robert Stokes.
- Taylor, Richard (1855). Te Ika a Maui, or New Zealand and its Inhabitants. London: Wertheim and Macintosh.
- Taylor, Richard (1868). The Past and Present of New Zealand; With Its Prospects for the Future. London: William Macintosh.
