= Bridge to Nowhere (New Zealand) =

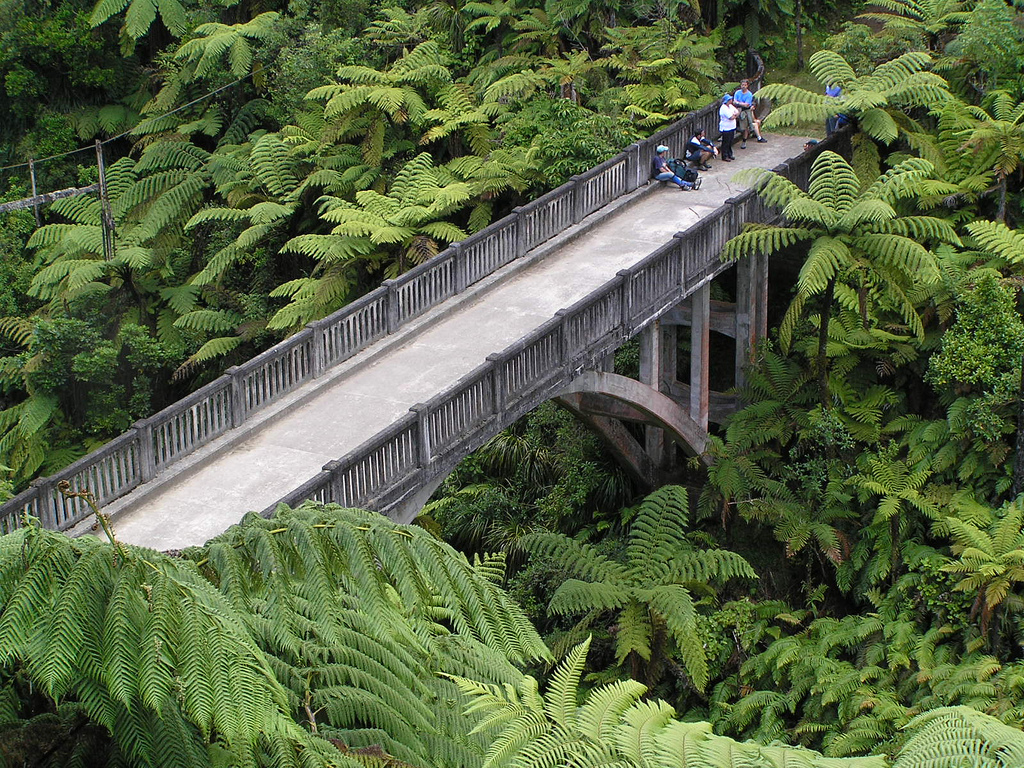
- The Bridge to Nowhere from the access path
- Coordinates: 39°16′15.31″S 174°58′19.88″E
- Carries: Footbridge
- Crosses: Mangapurua Stream
- Locale: Mangapurua Valley, Whanganui National Park, North Island, New Zealand

Characteristics
- Design: Arch bridge
- Material: Concrete
- Width: Single lane
- Height: 40 metres (130 ft)
- Longest span: 34.1 metres (112 ft)

History
- Designer: The Public Works Department
- Constructed by: Sandford and Brown
- Construction start: January 1935
- Construction end: June 1936

Location
- Interactive map of Bridge to Nowhere

The Bridge to Nowhere is a concrete road bridge spanning the Mangapurua Stream in Whanganui National Park, North Island, New Zealand. It has no roads leading to it, but it is a popular tourist attraction, accessible by mountain bike or tramping on a variety of different tracks, or by boat or kayak, followed by a 45-minute (one way) walk along maintained bush trails.

Level view of the bridge

It was built across the deep Mangapurua Gorge to provide access to an area where the government was opening up land in 1917 for pioneering farmers, mainly soldiers who had returned from World War I. The intention was to build roads to it later, but the area proved to be so remote and unsuitable for farming that the venture failed and the farms reverted to native bush.

A sign on the bridge states:

Started in January 1935 and completed in June 1936, this bridge was built by the Raetihi firm of Sandford and Brown, for the Public Works Department. It is 130 feet long, and 125 feet above the stream. The cost of labour was 598 pounds 11 shillings 7 pence, and cartage of all materials (via the Mangapurua Valley road) cost 419 pounds 14 shillings. Unfortunately the cost of materials was not recorded. Aggregate for the concrete is said to have been transported from the Rangitikei River. The completion of the bridge was delayed considerably due to floods, slips, and the consequent delay in the supply of materials. The bridge was built to facilitate vehicular access to the Wanganui River, to link the settlers of the valley with the riverboat service. In 1917 the Government opened up the valley for settlement by soldiers returning from World War I. Virgin forest was cleared, and a total of 35 holdings developed. A school was opened, and for some years the valley prospered. However economic hardship, and problems associated with the remoteness and difficulty of access, resulted in many families abandoning their farms. By 1942 there were only 3 families left. After a major flood in January 1942 the Government declined to make further funds available for road maintenance, and it officially closed the valley in May 1942. The disappearing road line, old fence lines, stands of exotic trees, occasional brick chimneys, and this bridge serve as reminders of the ill fated settlement of the Mangapurua valley.

The New Zealand Ministry for Culture and Heritage gives a translation of "abundant stream" for Mangapūrua.

== See also ==
- Bridges in New Zealand
