= Moutoa =

Koputaroa
- Rural locality
- Interactive map of Koputaroa
- Coordinates: 40.504746°S 175.395823°E
- Country: New Zealand
- Region: Manawatū-Whanganui region
- Territorial authority: Horowhenua District
- Wards: Miranui General Ward; Horowhenua Māori Ward
- Electorates: Rangitīkei (electorate); Te Tai Hauāuru (Māori)

Government
  - Territorial Authority: Horowhenua District Council
  - Regional council: Horizons Regional Council
  - Horowhenua Mayor: Bernie Wanden
  - Rangitīkei MP: Suze Redmayne
  - Te Tai Hauāuru MP: Debbie Ngarewa-Packer
- Postal code: 5575
- Area code: 06

Moutoa is a rural community in the Horowhenua District and Manawatū-Whanganui region of New Zealand's North Island, on the Manawatū River. It is located Foxton and State Highway 1 in the west, and Shannon and State Highway 57 in the west.

The name is Māori for warrior (toa) island (mou).

The local Whakawehi Marae and Poutu meeting house is a meeting place for the Ngāti Raukawa hapū of Ngāti Whakatere.
