= Ngāti Hauiti =

Māori iwi (tribe) in New Zealand

Ngāti Hauiti is a Māori iwi of New Zealand. It is centred in the Rangitikei area of the lower North Island.

Awa FM is the radio station of Ngāti Hauiti, Te Āti Haunui-a-Pāpārangi and Ngāti Hāua. It began as Te Reo Irirangi O Whanganui 100FM on 17 June 1991. Between July 1992 and June 1993 it also operated a separate station in Ohakune, known as Te Reo Irirangi Ki Ruapehu or Nga Iwi FM, combining local programmes with shows from 100FM. It is available on 100.0 FM in Whanganui, 91.2 FM in Ruapehu, and 93.5 FM in Taumarunui.

In the 2013 census in New Zealand, 1,026 people claimed affiliation with Ngāti Hauiti.

== See also ==
- List of Māori iwi
