= Mana Ariki Marae =

Marae in New Zealand

Mana Ariki, formerly known as Manu Ariki, is based in Taumarunui in New Zealand.

Mana Ariki is a marae (a communal or sacred place) closely linked to Ngaati Hekeawai of the Whanganui River tribes and Ngaati Maniapoto. The marae was originally the home and farm of the Phillips family (Alex and wife Betty and children). It is now a place of meditation, refuge and shelter.

Mana Ariki Marae is administered by Marae Reservation Trustee's and the grand daughter of the Phillips family who are in the process of sorting out legal and relationship issues with the Te Kotahitanga Society Inc, a religious group.

In October 2020, the Government committed $1,560,379 from the Provincial Growth Fund to upgrade the marae and 7 other nearby marae, creating 156 jobs.

It is home to a 7 1/4 inch railway surrounding the circumference of Mana Ariki Marae built by ikon engineering and occasionally runs open to the public on its extensive miniature ride-on railway.
