= Pawai, Vidisha =

Town in Madhya Pradesh, India

Coordinates: 23°45′N 77°57′E

Pawai is a town in Vidisha district, Madhya Pradesh, India.
