= Ngāti Hau =

- Iwi (tribe) in Māoridom
- Rohe (region): Whanganui

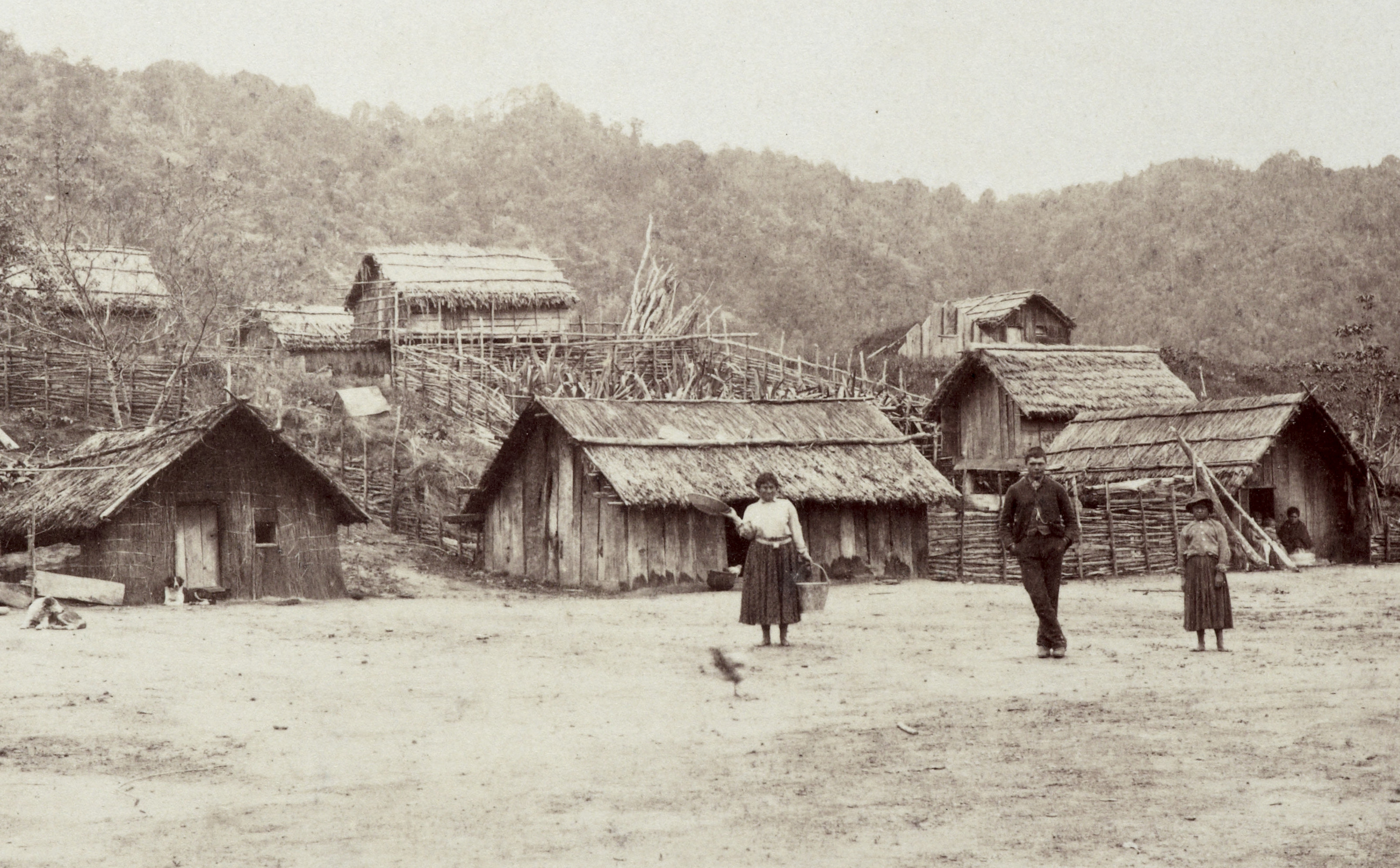
Ātene (Athens), a village on the Whanganui River, in about 1890

Ngāti Hau are the Māori iwi (tribes) of the Whanganui River area in New Zealand.

There are two stories of where the name Ngāti Hau comes from. One is that it comes from Haupipi, who arrived in New Zealand on the Aotea canoe, after his first canoe, Kurahaupō, was wrecked. The other is that it is derived from Te Āti Haunui-a-Pāpārangi, another name for the Whanganui Māori.

== See also ==
- List of Māori iwi
