= Tongariro (village) =

Village and rural community in New Zealand

Coordinates: 39.046047°S 175.603755°E

Tongariro is a village and rural community, located east of Taumarunui and west of Kuratau on State Highway 41.

It includes the Pāpākai Marae and Rākeipoho meeting house, a traditional tribal meeting place for the Ngāti Tūwharetoa hapū of Ngāti Hikairo.

== Name ==
The name Tongariro is derived from the Māori words Tonga meaning south wind and riro meaning carried away.
