= Whanganui District =

- Territorial authority district
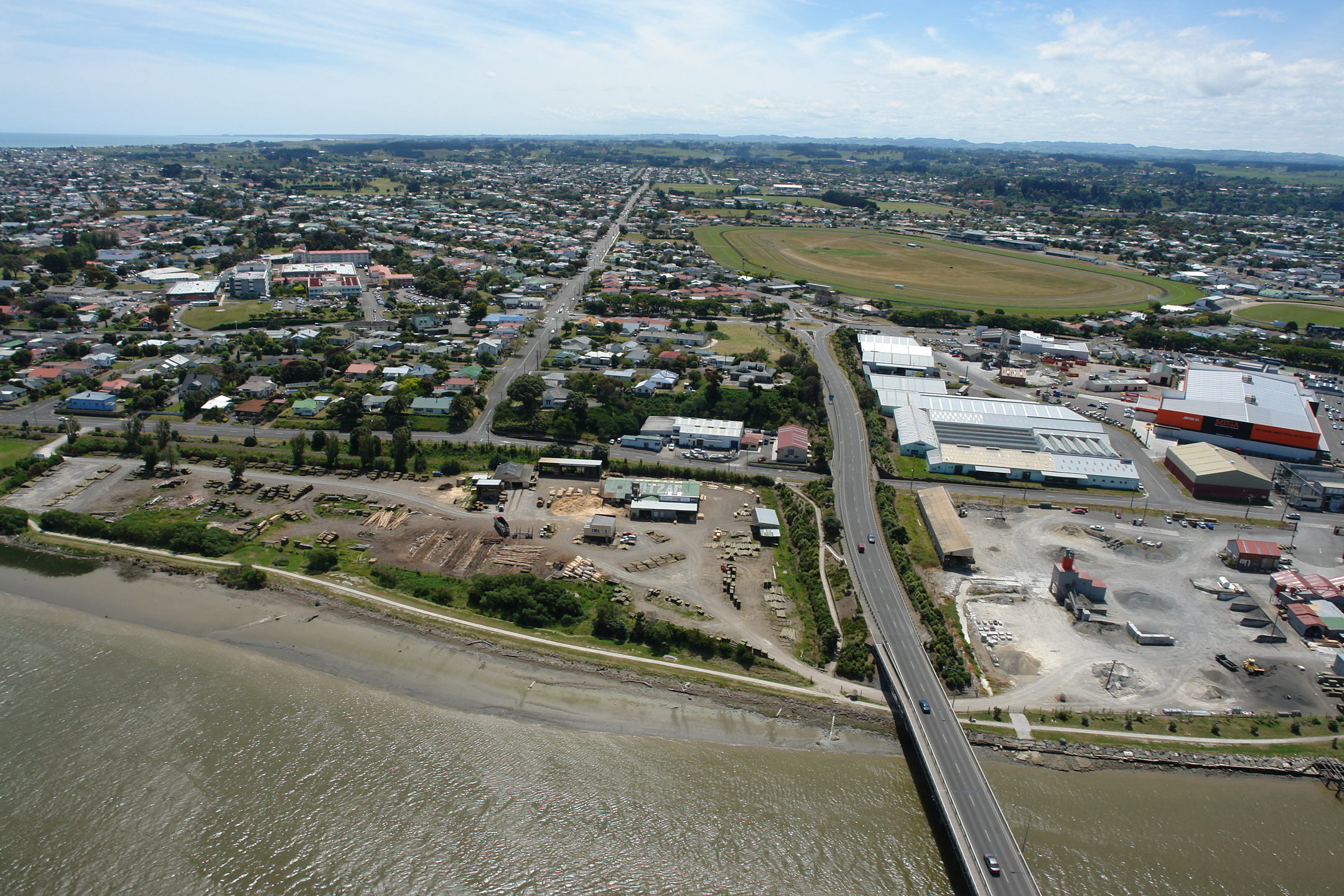
- Whanganui River Bridge View from Helicopter

- Whanganui district within the North Island
- Coordinates: 39°38′S 175°08′E
- Country: New Zealand
- Region: Manawatū-Whanganui
- Seat: Whanganui

Government
  - Mayor: Andrew Tripe
  - Territorial authority: Whanganui District Council

Area
  - Land: 2,373.27 km^{2} (916.32 sq mi)

Population (June 2025)
  - Total: 49,200
  - Density: 20.7/km^{2} (53.7/sq mi)
- Time zone: UTC+12 (NZST)
  - Summer (DST): UTC+13 (NZDT)
- Postcode(s): Map of postcodes
- Website: www.whanganui.govt.nz

Whanganui District is one of the districts of New Zealand. It includes the city of Whanganui and surrounding areas.

== Geography ==
Formerly spelled "Wanganui", the Whanganui District Council resulted from the amalgamation of Wanganui and Waitotara county councils and Wanganui City Council. The district has an area of 2,373 km^{2}. Much of the land in Whanganui District is rough hill country surrounding the valley of the Whanganui River. A large proportion of this is within the Whanganui National Park.

In 2015 the New Zealand Geographic Board, at the request of the Wanganui District Council, changed the name of the district from Wanganui District to Whanganui District, bringing the name in line with the spelling of the river.

== Demographics ==
Whanganui District covers 2,373.27 km^{2} (916.32 sq mi) and had an estimated population of 49,200 as of June 2025, with a population density of 21 people per km^{2}. All but some 6,400 people in the Whanganui District live in the city itself, meaning there are few prominent outlying settlements. A small but notable village is Jerusalem.

Historical population
Year	Pop.	±% p.a.
2006	42,636	—
2013	42,153	−0.16%
2018	45,309	+1.45%
2023	47,619	+1.00%

Whanganui District had a population of 47,619 in the 2023 New Zealand census, an increase of 2,310 people (5.1%) since the 2018 census, and an increase of 5,466 people (13.0%) since the 2013 census. There were 23,172 males, 24,282 females and 162 people of other genders in 18,909 dwellings. 3.0% of people identified as LGBTIQ+. The median age was 42.9 years (compared with 38.1 years nationally). There were 9,042 people (19.0%) aged under 15 years, 7,773 (16.3%) aged 15 to 29, 20,205 (42.4%) aged 30 to 64, and 10,599 (22.3%) aged 65 or older.

People could identify as more than one ethnicity. The results were 78.3% European (Pākehā); 28.5% Māori; 4.1% Pasifika; 5.1% Asian; 0.6% Middle Eastern, Latin American and African New Zealanders (MELAA); and 2.8% other, which includes people giving their ethnicity as "New Zealander". English was spoken by 97.2%, Māori language by 7.8%, Samoan by 0.7% and other languages by 6.3%. No language could be spoken by 1.9% (e.g. too young to talk). New Zealand Sign Language was known by 0.8%. The percentage of people born overseas was 13.4, compared with 28.8% nationally.

Religious affiliations were 32.1% Christian, 0.8% Hindu, 0.3% Islam, 3.1% Māori religious beliefs, 0.5% Buddhist, 0.7% New Age, 0.1% Jewish, and 1.2% other religions. People who answered that they had no religion were 53.4%, and 8.1% of people did not answer the census question.

Of those at least 15 years old, 4,854 (12.6%) people had a bachelor's or higher degree, 21,795 (56.5%) had a post-high school certificate or diploma, and 10,284 (26.7%) people exclusively held high school qualifications. The median income was $32,500, compared with $41,500 nationally. 2,292 people (5.9%) earned over $100,000 compared to 12.1% nationally. The employment status of those at least 15 was that 16,524 (42.8%) people were employed full-time, 5,349 (13.9%) were part-time, and 1,410 (3.7%) were unemployed.

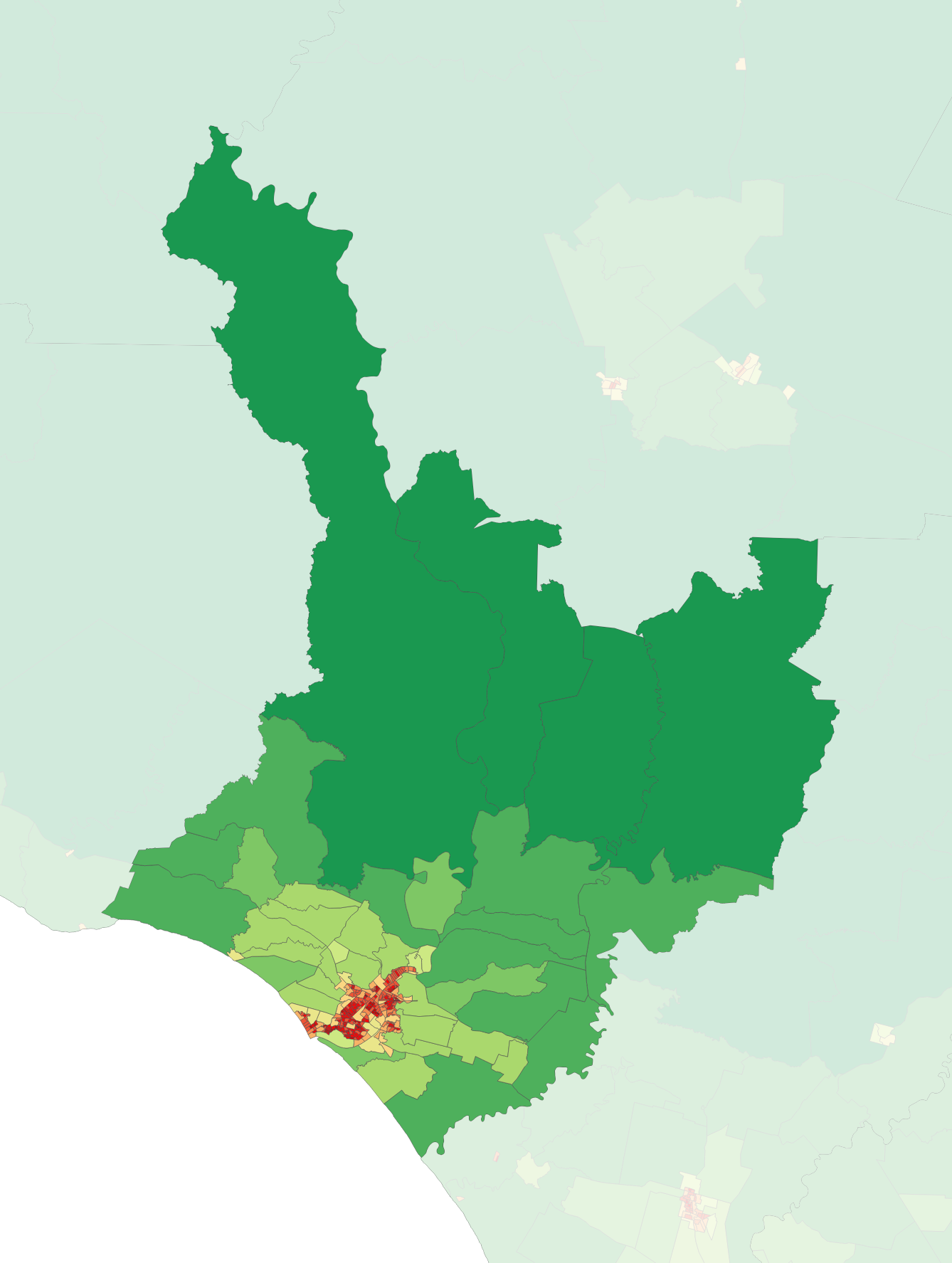
Population density in the 2023 census
