= Ngāti Apa =

Māori iwi (tribe) in Aotearoa New Zealand

- Iwi (tribe) in Māoridom
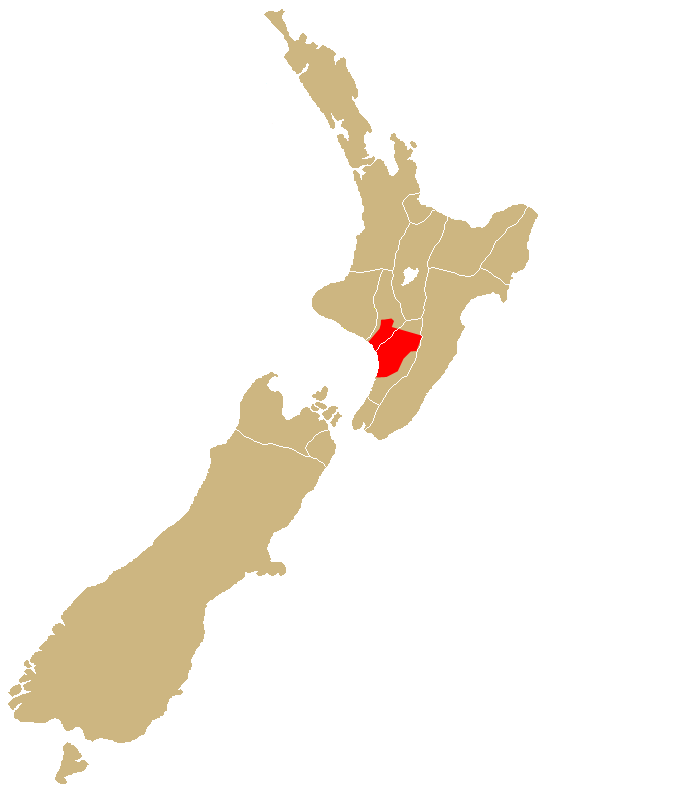
- Rohe (region): Manawatū
- Waka (canoe): Kurahaupō
- Population: 3021
- Website: ngatiapa.iwi.nz

Ngāti Apa is a Māori iwi (tribe) in Rangitikei District of New Zealand. Its rohe (traditional tribal lands) extend between the Mangawhero, Whangaehu, Turakina and Rangitīkei rivers. This area is bounded by Whanganui River in the north-west, and Manawatū River in the south-east. The marae in this district include Tini wai tara, Whangaehu, Kauangāroa, and Parewanui.

== History ==
Ko Kurahaupo te Waka

Ko Taikorea, Paaraekaretu me Ruapehu Ngaa Maunga
Ko Whangaehu, Turakina, Rangitikei Me Oroua Ngaa Awa
Ko Apa Hapaitaketake Te Tangata Tuuturu

Apa Wetewete I Te Takiritanga O Te Ata

(Apa The Destroyer who rises before dawn)

Ngāti Apa take their name from the ancestor Apa-hāpai-taketake, who was the son of Ruatea. Stories of Apa's deeds place the tribe's origins in the Bay of Plenty. To the west of Pūtauaki mountain is a place known to Māori as Te Takanga-a-Apa (the place where Apa fell), so named because, according to one account, it was where Apa was kicked to the ground by the pet moa of a man called Te Awatope. Because he limped after this incident, he was named Apa-koki (Apa with a limp). One explanation for the place name is that Apa fell to his death there. Another account says he was banished from the district after slaughtering Te Awatope's moa.

Ngāti Apa then found themselves living in the Rotoaira lake district. Apa started sending parts of his tribe south to cultivate the land and have settlements ready before the whole party travelled down. However Apa did not leave until after he had eaten one of Te Awatope's favourite dogs. Te Awatope sought to kill Apa as this dog was his favourite. However, when he went to where Ngāti Apa had settled he was told by some people that Apa had been warned the previous evening and had already proceeded south during the night. Many generations later, Ngāti Apa were not only descended from Apa Hāpaitaketake, but also of Turi captain of Aotea Paerangi normally associated to the Āti Hau and Ngāti Rangi tribes. Some along the Rangitīkei River (Papawhenua's descendants) were not only of Kurahaupō, but also of Matahourua.

Many Ngāti Apa deny any connection to the Bay Of Plenty, Pūtauaki area.

Today Ngāti apa have many Hapū, named here are the ones still active to this day.

- Turakina
  - Ngā Āriki. Ngāti Kiriwheke and Ngāti Rātua
- Whangaehu
  - Ngāti Hikapirau, Ngāti Rangiwaho, Ngāti Rangiwhakaturia and Ngāti Rangipakini
