= Ngāti Rangi =

Māori iwi (tribe) in Aotearoa (New Zealand)

- Iwi (tribe) in Māoridom
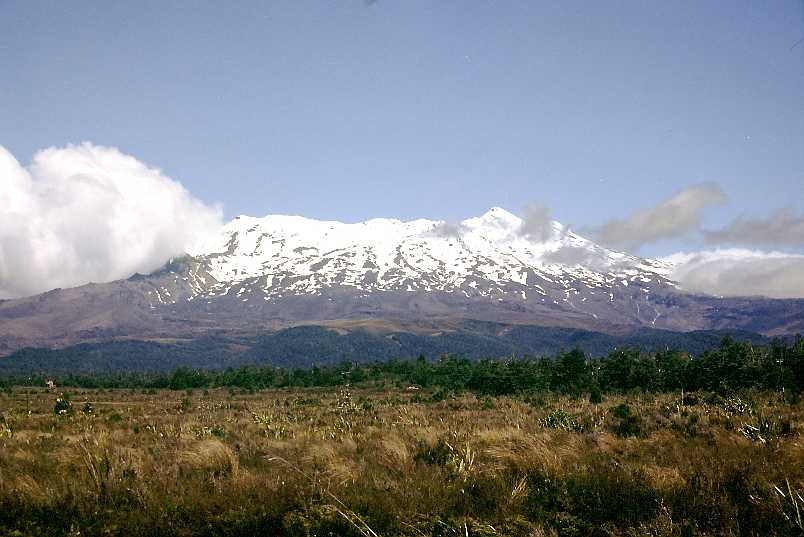
- Mount Ruapehu
- Rohe (region): Central North Island
- Website: ngatirangi.com

Ngāti Rangi or Ngāti Rangituhia is a Māori iwi (tribe) of New Zealand. Contemporary settlement is mainly around Waiouru, Ohakune, and the Upper Whanganui River in the central North Island. The iwi's rohe (tribal area) of interest extends north from the Paretetaitonga peak of Mount Ruapehu, west to the Pukupuku Stream, east to the meeting of the Moawhango and Aorangi waterways, and south to the Haumakariri Stream. Ngāti Rangi trace their ancestry to Paerangi. They believe they were in New Zealand before the first migrations from Hawaiki.

In 2015, Ngāti Rangi entered into negotiations with the Crown to settle claims under the Treaty of Waitangi. A deed of settlement was signed in 2018 followed by the passing of the Ngāti Rangi Claims Settlement Bill - Rukutia Te Mana in 2019. They also commenced negotiations with Genesis Energy in 2010 to manage and restore water flows in rivers from which water had been diverted for the Tongariro Power Scheme.

Since 2006 Ngāti Rangi have been a partner in the conservation programme Kiwi Forever hosting students on their marae to learn about the flora and fauna and tikanga Māori (Māori traditions). In 2026 ten kiwi were released into the Rotokura and Rangataua forests, the first of 40 kiwi to be translocated to the Ruapehu area.

The iwi received funding from the Government’s Jobs for Nature programme in 2021 to tackle invasive plant and animal pests. The programme would be delivered by the iwi's company Ruapehu WorX.

== Pepeha (tribal saying) ==
Ko Ruapehu te maunga
Ko Ngā Turi o Murimotu te maunga tapu
Ko Whangaehu te awa
Ko Ngāti Rangi te iwi
