= Te Korowai o Wainuiārua =

- Iwi (tribe) in Māoridom

Te Korowai o Wainuiārua is a grouping of Māori hapū in the northern Manawatū-Whanganui region of New Zealand. It was formed in 2014 to represent the large natural group (hapū with a common ancestry and from the same geographical area) of the middle Whanganui River area. It is made up of the Tamahaki, Tamakana and Uenuku ki Manganui-a-te-Ao, nā Tukaihoro hapū. Its area of interest covers some 6,130 km^{2} (2,370 sq mi), including central and upper parts of the Whanganui River, Whanganui National Park, Tongariro National Park, Raetihi and National Park. A Treaty settlement signed at Raetihi Marae on 29 July 2023 included an apology, $28.5m of compensation, return of forestry land at Erua, the former Waikune prison, support to create a predator-proofed sanctuary at Pōkākā and a seat on Tongariro-Taupō Conservation Board.

== See also ==
- List of Māori iwi
