= Whanganui Māori =

Māori iwi (tribes) in New Zealand (Aotearoa)

Whanganui Iwi
- Iwi (tribe) in Māoridom

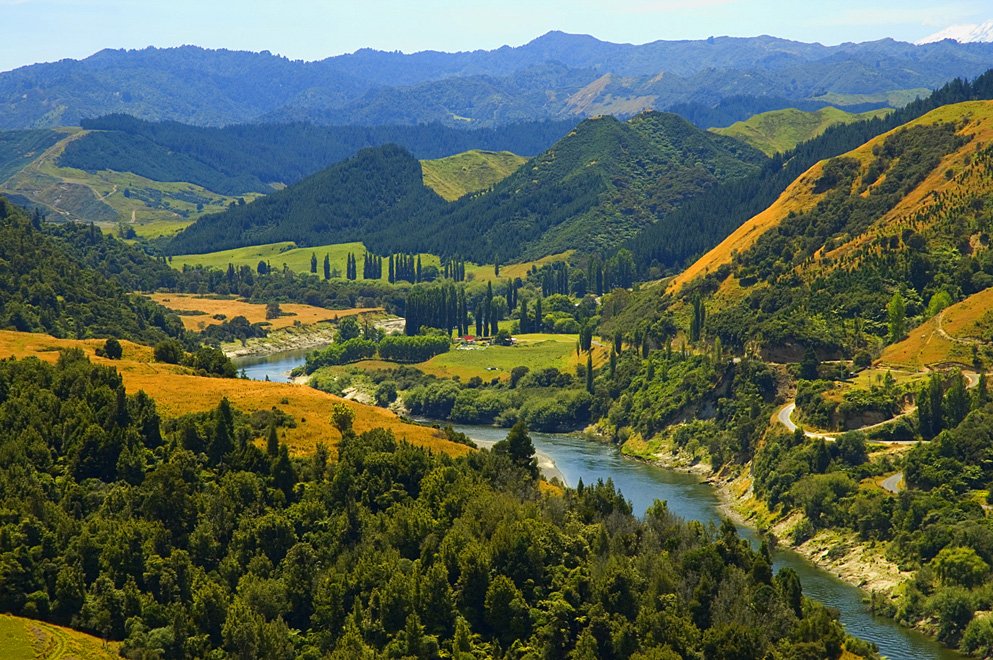
The Whanganui River flowing through New Zealand

Whanganui Māori are the Māori iwi (tribes) and hapū (sub-tribes) of the Whanganui River area of New Zealand. They are also known as Ngāti Hau.

== History ==
One group of Whanganui Māori, Whanganui Iwi, includes Te Āti Haunui-a-Pāpārangi and other hapū who signed the Ruruku Whakatupua Treaty of Waitangi settlement in 2015.

On 29 January 2026, the New Zealand Parliament passed legislation formalising the New Zealand Crown's Treaty of Waitangi settlement with Ngāti Hāua. The settlement package included NZ$19 million worth of financial redress, the return of 64 culturally-significant sites and posthumous pardons for Mātene Rita Te Whareaitu and Te Rangiātea.

== Community ==
Awa FM is the radio station of Te Āti Haunui-a-Pāpārangi, Ngāti Hāua and Ngāti Hauiti. It began as Te Reo Irirangi O Whanganui 100FM on 17 June 1991. Between July 1992 and June 1993 it also operated a separate station in Ohakune, known as Te Reo Irirangi Ki Ruapehu or Nga Iwi FM, combining local programmes with shows from 100FM. It is available on 100.0 FM in Whanganui, 91.0 FM in Ruapehu, and 93.5 FM in Taumarunui.

== Notable people ==
- Kāwana Pitiroi Paipai

== See also ==
- List of Māori iwi
