= List of schools in Manawatū-Whanganui =

Manawatū-Whanganui is a region in the North Island of New Zealand. It contains numerous small rural primary schools, some small town primary and secondary schools, and city schools in the Wanganui and Palmerston North areas.

In New Zealand schools, students begin formal education in Year 1 at the age of five. Year 13 is the final year of secondary education. Years 14 and 15 refer to adult education facilities. State schools are those fully funded by the government and at which no fees for tuition of domestic students (i.e. New Zealand citizens and permanent residents, and Australian citizens) can be charged, although a donation is commonly requested. A state integrated school is a former private school with a special character based on a religious or philosophical belief that has been integrated into the state system. State integrated schools charge "attendance dues" to cover the building and maintenance of school buildings, which are not owned by the government, but otherwise they like state schools cannot charge fees for tuition of domestic students but may request a donation. Private schools charge fees to its students for tuition, as do state and state integrated schools for tuition of international students.

The socioeconomic decile indicates the socioeconomic status of the school's catchment area. A decile of 1 indicates the school draws from a poor area; a decile of 10 indicates the school draws from a well-off area. The decile ratings used here come from the Ministry of Education Te Kete Ipurangi website and from the decile change spreadsheet listed in the references. The deciles were last revised using information from the 2006 Census. The roll of each school changes frequently as students start school for the first time, move between schools, and graduate. The rolls given here are those provided by the Ministry of Education are based on figures from November 2012. The Ministry of Education institution number links to the Education Counts page for each school.

== Ruapehu District ==
All schools in the Ruapehu district are coeducational.

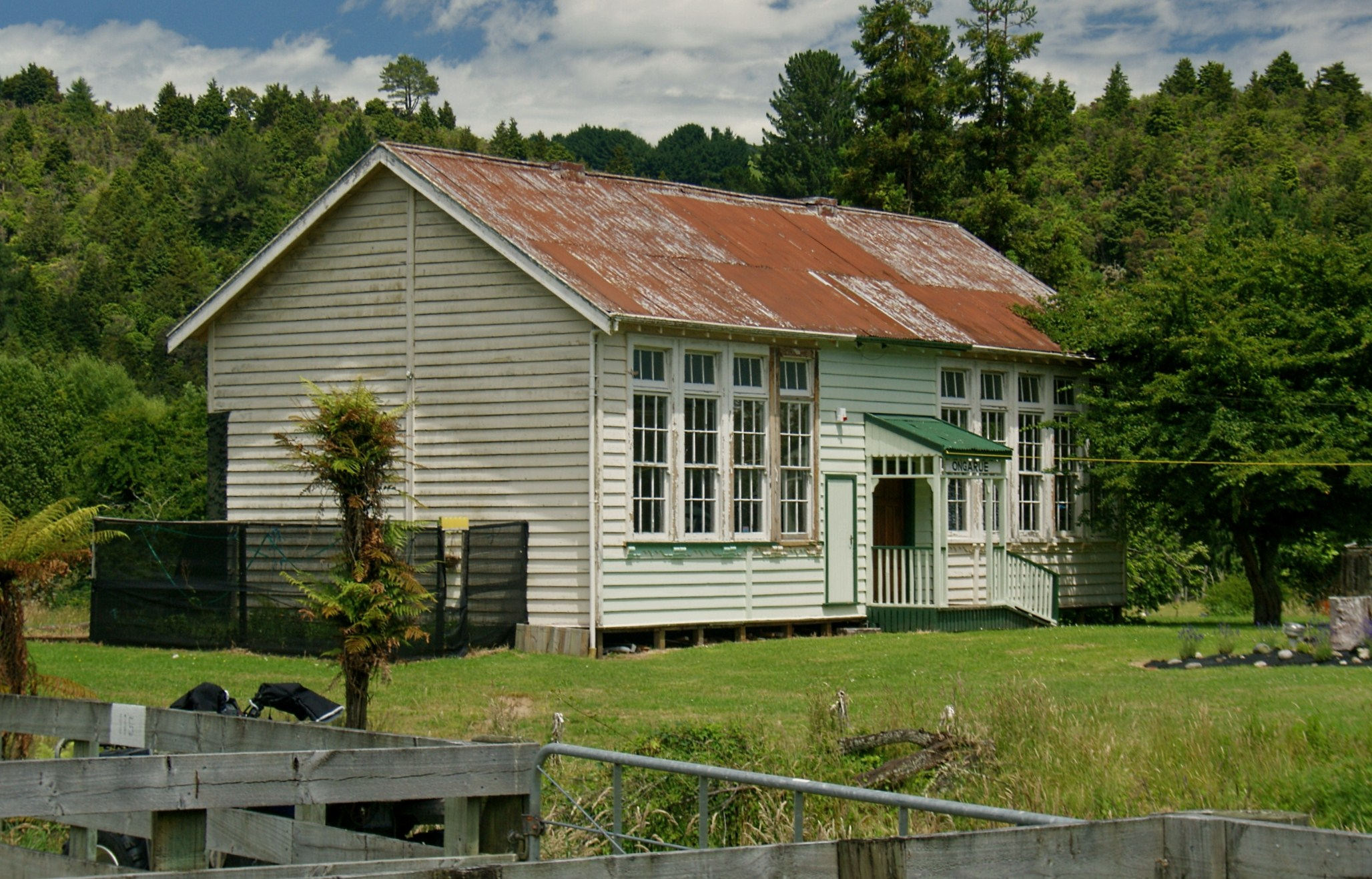
Ongarue School (Dec.2011)

Name	Years	Area	Authority	Decile	Roll	Website	MOE
Kaitieke School	1–8	Kaitieke	State	8	8		2371
Manunui School	1–8	Manunui	State	1	136	-	2393
Matiere School	1–8	Matiere	State	2	28	-	2195
National Park School	1–8	National Park	State	3	32		2405
Ngakonui Valley School	1–8	Taringamotu	State	3	50	-	1845
Ohakune School	1–8	Ohakune	State	5	262		2410
Ohura Valley Primary	1–8	Ōhura	State	3	12	-	176
Ongarue School	1–8	Ongarue	State	3	8	-	2215
Orautoha School	1–8	Orautoha	State	8	48	-	2413
Owhango School	1–8	Ōwhango	State	5	69		2417
Raetihi Primary School	1–8	Raetihi	State	1	89	-	2429
Ruapehu College	9–13	Ohakune	State	3	247		183
St Patrick's Catholic School	1–8	Taumarunui	State integrated	4	61	-	1961
Tarrangower School	1–8	Taumarunui	State	1	63		1982
Taumarunui High School	9–13	Taumarunui	State	2	300		169
Taumarunui Primary School	1–8	Taumarunui	State	1	142	-	1986
Te Kura o Nga Iwi e Toru ki Taumarunui	1–8	Taumarunui	State	2	95		3118
Te Kura o Ngapuke	1–8	Ngapuke	State	1	15	-	1847
TKKM o Ngati Rangi	1–8	Ohakune	State	1	51	-	1617
Tokirima School	1–8	Tokirima	State	6	28		2253
Turaki School	1–8	Taumarunui	State	2	182		2040
Waiouru School	1–8	Waiouru	State	7	93		2472

=== Closed schools ===
Kakahi School closed in April 2016 after 106 years.

Kirikau School closed in 2013 after 85 years.

== Whanganui District ==
Name	Years	Gender	Area	Authority	Roll	Website	MOE	ERO
Aberfeldy School	1–8	Coed	Parikino	State	14	-	2330	2330
Arahunga School	1-6	Coed	Gonville	State	120		2334	2334
Aranui School	1–6	Coed	Castlecliff	State	62	-	2336	2336
Brunswick School	1–8	Coed	Brunswick	State	107		2342	2342
Carlton School	1–6	Coed	College Estate	State	268		2345	2345
Castlecliff School	1–6	Coed	Castlecliff	State	153		2346	
Churton School	1–6	Coed	Aramoho	State	119	-	2348	2348
Cullinane College	9–13	Coed	St Johns Hill	State integrated	495	-	190	190
Durie Hill School	1–6	Coed	Durie Hill	State	188	-	2355	2355
Faith Academy	1–8	Coed	Springvale	State integrated	157		422	422
Fordell School	1–8	Coed	Fordell	State	128		2357	2357
Gonville School	1–6	Coed	Gonville	State	163		2361	2361
Kai Iwi School	1–8	Coed	Kai Iwi	State	96		2369	2369
Kaitoke School	1–8	Coed	Kaitoke	State	113	-	2372	2372
Kakatahi School	1–8	Coed	Kakatahi	State	14	–	2375	2375
Keith Street School	1–6	Coed	Whanganui Central	State	171	-	2378	2378
Te Kura o Kokohuia	1–13	Coed	Castlecliff	State	230	-	2384	2384
Mangamahu Primary School	1–8	Coed	Mangamahu	State	6		2391	2391
Mosston School	1–6	Coed	Springvale	State	173		2403	2403
Okoia School	1–8	Coed	Okoia	State	52	-	2412	2412
Rutherford Junior High	7–8	Coed	Tawhero	State	140		2442	2442
St Anne's School	1–8	Coed	Whanganui East	State integrated	219		2447	2447
St Anthony's School	1–8	Coed	Gonville	Private	91	-	1585	1585
St. Dominic's College	9–13	Coed	Gonville	Private	51	-	454	454
St George's Preparatory School	1–8	Coed	College Estate	State integrated	133		4130	4130
St Johns Hill School	1–6	Coed	St Johns Hill	State	404	-	2450	2450
St Marcellin Catholic School	1–8	Coed	Tawhero	State integrated	52		2395	2395
St Mary's School	1–8	Coed	Aramoho	State integrated	241	-	2454	2454
Tawhero School	1–6	Coed	Tawhero	State	176	-	2465	2465
TKKM o Te Atihaunui-A-Paparangi	1–8	Coed	Putiki	State	126		4160	4160
TKKM o Tupoho	1–13	Coed	Castlecliff	State	178	-	2377	2377
Te Kura o Te Wainui a Rua	1–8	Coed	Ranana	State	52		559	559
Upokongaro School	1–8	Coed	Upokongaro	State	91		2469	2469
Whanganui City College	9–13	Coed	College Estate	State	290		187	187
Wanganui Collegiate School	9–13	Coed	College Estate	State integrated	357		192	192
Whanganui East School	1–6	Coed	Whanganui East	State	157	-	2476	2476
Whanganui Girls' College	9–13	Girls	Whanganui East	State	363		188	188
Whanganui High School	9–13	Coed	College Estate	State	1,461		189	189
Whanganui Intermediate	7–8	Coed	College Estate	State	416		2477	2477
Westmere School	1–8	Coed	Westmere	State	235		2480	2480

=== Closed schools ===
Aramoho School closed at the end of 2016 after 143 years.

Ngamatea School, which opened as Te Pou School in 1915, closed in 2017. |-

== Rangitikei District ==
Name	Years	Gender	Area	Authority	Roll	Website	MOE
Bulls School	1–8	Coed	Bulls	State	167		2343
Clifton School	1–8	Coed	Bulls	State	141		2349
Hunterville Consolidated School	1–8	Coed	Hunterville	State	107		2366
Huntley School	3–8	Coed	Marton	Private	164		4111
James Cook School	1–8	Coed	Marton	State	145	-	2368
Mangaweka School	1–8	Coed	Mangaweka	State	44		2392
Marton Junction School	1–8	Coed	Marton	State	89	-	2396
Marton School	1–8	Coed	Marton	State	202		2397
Mataroa School	1–8	Coed	Mataroa	State	57	-	2398
Moawhango School	1–8	Coed	Moawhango	State	28		2401
Nga Tawa Diocesan School	9–13	Girls	Marton	State integrated	198		196
Papanui Junction School	1–8	Coed	Papanui Junction	State	10	–	2420
Pukeokahu School	1–8	Coed	Pukeokahu	State	5		2428
Rangitikei College	9–13	Coed	Marton	State	328		195
South Makirikiri School	1–8	Coed	Marton	State	149		2446
St Joseph's School	1–8	Coed	Taihape	State integrated	78		2453
St Matthew's School	1–8	Coed	Marton	State integrated	55		2456
Taihape Area School	1–13	Coed	Taihape	State	254		549
Taoroa School	1–8	Coed	Taoroa Junction	State	44		2463
Te Kura o Ratana	1–8	Coed	Rātana Pā	State	61	-	2436
Turakina School	1–8	Coed	Turakina	State	30		2468
Whangaehu School	1–8	Coed	Whangaehu	State	17	–	2482

== Manawatū District ==
Name	Years	Gender	Area	Authority	Decile	Roll	Website	MOE
Āpiti School	1–8	Coed	Āpiti	State	9	26		2333
Awahou School	1–8	Coed	Pohangina	State	10	52		2338
Bainesse School	1–8	Coed	Rangiotu	State	4	32		2341
Colyton School	1–8	Coed	Colyton	State	9	130		2354
Feilding High School	9–13	Coed	Feilding	State	5	1650		197
Feilding Intermediate	7–8	Coed	Feilding	State	5	314		2356
Glen Oroua School	1–8	Coed	Glen Oroua	State	9	65	-	2360
Halcombe School	1–8	Coed	Halcombe	State	7	163	-	2362
Hato Paora College	9–13	Boys	Cheltenham	State integrated	3	92		199
Hiwinui School	1–8	Coed	Hiwinui	State	10	87	-	2364
Kimbolton School	1–8	Coed	Kimbolton	State	7	54	-	2379
Kiwitea School	1–8	Coed	Kiwitea	State	10	49	-	2382
Kopane School	1–8	Coed	Rongotea	State	8	47		2385
Longburn School	1–8	Coed	Longburn	State	5	71		2388
Lytton Street School	1–6	Coed	Feilding	State	3	392		2389
Manchester Street School	1–6	Coed	Feilding	State	6	414		2390
Mount Biggs School	1–8	Coed	Halcombe	State	8	79		2404
Newbury School	1–8	Coed	Newbury	State	9	178		2406
North Street School	1–8	Coed	Feilding	State	4	421		2409
Oroua Downs School	1–8	Coed	Himatangi	State	5	91		2414
Rongotea School	1–8	Coed	Rongotea	State	6	102	-	2438
Sanson School	1–8	Coed	Sanson	State	5	39		2443
St Joseph's School	1–8	Coed	Feilding	State integrated	6	126	-	2451
Tangimoana School	1–8	Coed	Tangimoana	State	2	20		2461
Taonui School	1–8	Coed	Feilding	State	5	45		2462
Waituna West School	1–8	Coed	Waituna West	State	7	51		2475

== Palmerston North City ==
Name	MOE	Years	Gender	Area	Authority	Opened	Roll	Website	Notes
Aokautere School	2332	1–6	Coed	Aokautere	State	1889	152		
Ashhurst School	2337	1–8	Coed	Ashhurst	State	1879	447		
Awapuni School	2339	1–6	Coed	Awapuni	State	1958	100		
Awatapu College	198	9–13	Coed	Awapuni	State	1976	870		
Bunnythorpe School	2344	1–8	Coed	Bunnythorpe	State		29	-	
Carncot Independent School	4101	1–8	Coed	Palmerston North Central	Private	1903	129		
Central Normal School	2418	1–6	Coed	Takaro	State	1872	462		
Cloverlea School	2350	1–6	Coed	Cloverlea	State	1975	230	-	
College Street Normal School	2353	1–6	Coed	Hokowhitu	State	1893	591		
Cornerstone Christian School	1172	1–13	Coed	Kelvin Grove	State integrated	1987	603		
Freyberg High School	200	9–13	Coed	Roslyn	State	1955	952		
Hokowhitu School	2365	1–6	Coed	Hokowhitu	State	1924	360		
Kairanga School	2370	1–8	Coed	Kairanga	State	1888	150		
Linton Camp School	2386	1–8	Coed	Linton	State		147		
Longburn Adventist College	191	7–13	Coed	Longburn	State integrated	1908	220		
Mana Tamariki	465	1–13	Coed	Palmerston North Central	State		68	-	Designated Character school
Manukura School		9-13	Coed	Hokowhitu	State	2005	191		Designated Character school
Milson School	2400	1–6	Coed	Milson	State		334		
Monrad - Te Kura Waenga o Tirohanga	2402	7–8	Coed	Highbury	State	1963	334		
Our Lady of Lourdes School	2416	1–6	Coed	Takaro	State integrated		149		
Palmerston North Adventist Christian School	4126	1–6	Coed	Palmerston North Central	State integrated	1917	100		
Palmerston North Boys' High School	202	9–13	Boys	Takaro	State	1920	1,821		
Palmerston North Girls' High School	203	9–13	Girls	West End	State	1920	1,329		
Palmerston North Intermediate	2419	7–8	Coed	Palmerston North Central	State	1941	749		
Parkland School	2424	1–6	Coed	Terrace End	State		312		
Queen Elizabeth College	201	7–13	Coed	Takaro	State	1906	415		
Riverdale School	2437	1–6	Coed	Awapuni	State	1965	366		
Roslyn School	2439	1–8	Coed	Roslyn	State		394		
Ross Intermediate	2440	7–8	Coed	Roslyn	State	1958	440		
Russell Street School	2441	1–6	Coed	Papaioea	State		323		
St James School	2449	1–6	Coed	Hokowhitu	State integrated		141		
St Mary's School	2457	1–6	Coed	Roslyn	State integrated		222		
St Peter's College	204	7–13	Coed	Milson	State integrated	1974	787		Catholic
Terrace End School	2466	1–6	Coed	Terrace End	State	1884	215		
TKKM o Manawatū	4209	1–8	Coed	Kelvin Grove	State		117	-	
Te Kura O Takaro	2460	1–8	Coed	Takaro	State		202		
Te Kura o Wairau	2363	1–6	Coed	Westbrook	State		153		
Turitea School	2467	1–6	Coed	Turitea	State		132		
West End School	2479	1–6	Coed	West End	State	1913	342		
Whakarongo School	2481	1–8	Coed	Whakarongo	State		474		
Whakatipuria Teen Parent Unit	2756	–	–	Roslyn	State		0	–	Teen parent unit
Winchester School	2484	1–6	Coed	Hokowhitu	State	1958	333		

=== Closed schools ===
- Linton Country School, 1889 to 2023

== Tararua District ==
Name	Years	Gender	Area	Authority	Roll	Website	MOE	ERO
Alfredton School	1–8	Coed	Alfredton	State	24		2801	2801
Ballance School	1–8	Coed	Ballance	State	22	-	2805	2805
Dannevirke High School	9–13	Coed	Dannevirke	State	415		234	234
Dannevirke South School	1–8	Coed	Dannevirke	State	266		2553	2553
Eketāhuna School	1–8	Coed	Eketāhuna	State	101		2835	2835
Huia Range School	1–8	Coed	Dannevirke	State	219		1662	1662
Kumeroa School	1–8	Coed	Kumeroa	State	33	-	601	601
Makuri School	1–8	Coed	Makuri	State	14	-	2895	2895
Mangatainoka School	1–8	Coed	Mangatainoka	State	48	-	2900	2900
Norsewood and Districts School	1–8	Coed	Norsewood	State	41	-	2622	2622
Pahiatua School	1–8	Coed	Pahiatua	State	331		2945	2945
Pongaroa School	1–8	Coed	Pongaroa	State	49		2962	2962
Ruahine School	1–8	Coed	Dannevirke	State	172		2669	2669
St Anthony's School	1–8	Coed	Pahiatua	State integrated	122		2998	2998
St Joseph's School	1–8	Coed	Dannevirke	State integrated	125	-	2676	2676
Tararua College	9–13	Coed	Pahiatua	State	383		235	235
TKKM o Tāmaki Nui A Rua	1–13	Coed	Dannevirke	State	81		4226	4226
Totara College of Accelerated Learning	1–13	Coed	Dannevirke	State integrated	81	-	439	439
Weber School	1–8	Coed	Weber	State	32	-	2732	2732
Woodville School	1–8	Coed	Woodville	State	121		2742	2742

=== Closed schools ===
- Waitahora School 1903–2002
- Motea School 1916–2002
- Awariki School (opened 1904), Ormondville School (opened 1878), and Matamau School (opened 1887) merged into Norsewood School in 2003.
- Kohinui School, Kohinui, closed in January 2008 and merged with Kumeroa-Hopelands School.
- Tiraumea School, closed January 2012.
- Wimbledon School, Wimbledon.
- Ākitio school, closed on 27 Jan 2014. Reunion held on 25–28 March 2016.
- Mangamairei country school, closed in mid 2015. A 130th reunion was held at the school.
- Hillcrest School, closed in April 2019 due to its low roll.
- Papatawa School, 1887–2023.

== Horowhenua District ==
Name	Years	Gender	Area	Authority	Roll	Website	MOE
Coley Street School	1–8	Coed	Foxton	State	214		2352
Fairfield School	1–8	Coed	Levin	State	387		2838
Foxton Beach School	1–8	Coed	Foxton Beach	State	105		2358
Foxton School	1–8	Coed	Foxton	State	86		2359
Horowhenua College	9–13	Coed	Levin	State	885		236
Koputaroa School	1–8	Coed	Koputaroa	State	183		2882
Levin East School	1–6	Coed	Levin	State	398		2886
Levin Intermediate	7–8	Coed	Levin	State	278		2887
Levin North School	1–6	Coed	Levin	State	240		2888
Levin School	1–6	Coed	Levin	State	256		2889
Manakau School	1–6	Coed	Manakau	State	98		2896
Manawatū College	9–13	Coed	Foxton	State	292		205
Ohau School	1–8	Coed	Ōhau	State	154		2933
Opiki School	1–8	Coed	Opiki	State	114		2937
Poroutawhao School	1–8	Coed	Poroutawhao	State	95		2965
Shannon School	1–8	Coed	Shannon	State	127		2989
St Joseph's School	1–8	Coed	Levin	State integrated	184	-	3008
St Mary's School	1–8	Coed	Foxton	State integrated	39		2455
Taitoko School	1–8	Coed	Levin	State	242		3032
Tokomaru School	1–8	Coed	Tokomaru	State	71		3046
Waiopehu College	9–13	Coed	Levin	State	570		237
