= Durie Hill =

Suburb of Whanganui

- Suburb
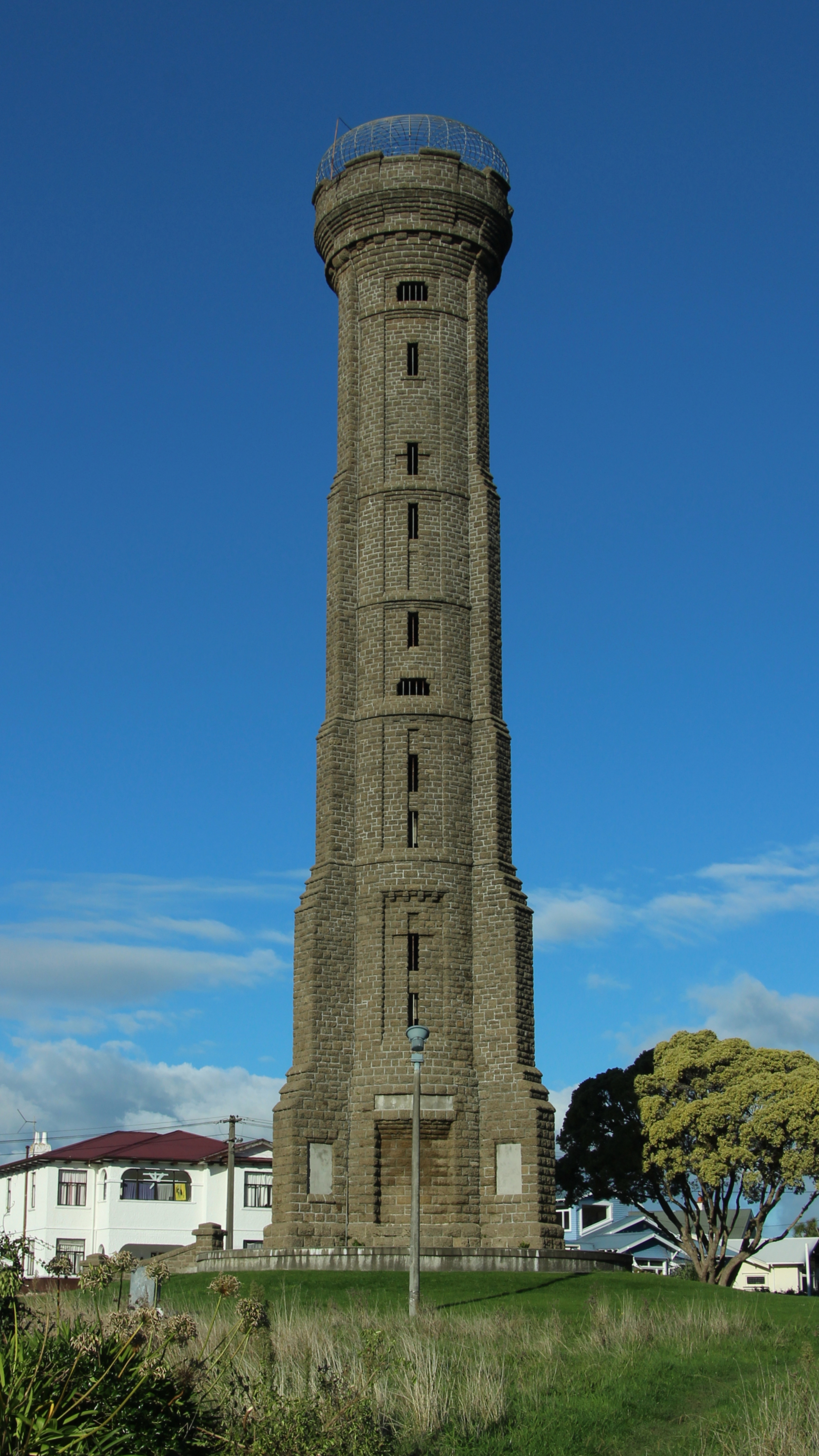
- Durie Hill Memorial Tower
- Interactive map of Durie Hill
- Country: New Zealand
- City: Whanganui
- Local authority: Whanganui District Council

Area
  - Land: 257 ha (640 acres)

Population (June 2025)
  - Total: 2,250
  - Density: 875/km^{2} (2,270/sq mi)

	Whanganui East; Bastia Hill
(Whanganui River) Whanganui Central	Durie Hill	Okoia
Putiki	Marybank

Durie Hill is a suburb of Whanganui, in the Whanganui District and Manawatū-Whanganui region of New Zealand's North Island.

The suburb was designed in 1920 by Samuel Hurst Seager as a garden suburb based on garden-city planning principles. It was designed with curvilinear streets, reserves, croquet lawns and tennis courts.

The Durie Hill Elevator connects the suburb with Anzac Parade. The elevator and tunnel were proposed by Wanganui Chronicle editor John Ball and Technical School engineering instructor Edward Crow, but most residents of the new suburb refused to fund it.

A revitalisation programme was launched in 2019, including the introduction of planter boxes and the founding of a village market.

== Demographics ==
Bastia-Durie Hill statistical area covers 2.57 km^{2} (0.99 sq mi) and had an estimated population of 2,250 as of June 2025, with a population density of 875 people per km^{2}.

Historical population
Year	Pop.	±% p.a.
2006	2,139	—
2013	2,112	−0.18%
2018	2,130	+0.17%
2023	2,202	+0.67%

Bastia-Durie Hill had a population of 2,202 in the 2023 New Zealand census, an increase of 72 people (3.4%) since the 2018 census, and an increase of 90 people (4.3%) since the 2013 census. There were 1,086 males, 1,113 females, and 3 people of other genders in 915 dwellings. 3.3% of people identified as LGBTIQ+. The median age was 48.6 years (compared with 38.1 years nationally). There were 372 people (16.9%) aged under 15 years, 300 (13.6%) aged 15 to 29, 954 (43.3%) aged 30 to 64, and 573 (26.0%) aged 65 or older.

People could identify as more than one ethnicity. The results were 88.6% European (Pākehā); 19.5% Māori; 3.0% Pasifika; 3.3% Asian; 1.1% Middle Eastern, Latin American and African New Zealanders (MELAA); and 2.0% other, which includes people giving their ethnicity as "New Zealander". English was spoken by 98.6%, Māori by 4.6%, Samoan by 0.3%, and other languages by 6.8%. No language could be spoken by 1.4% (e.g. too young to talk). New Zealand Sign Language was known by 0.3%. The percentage of people born overseas was 16.8, compared with 28.8% nationally.

Religious affiliations were 30.5% Christian, 0.7% Hindu, 0.8% Islam, 1.8% Māori religious beliefs, 0.5% Buddhist, 0.7% New Age, and 1.2% other religions. People who answered that they had no religion were 57.6%, and 6.4% of people did not answer the census question.

Of those at least 15 years old, 456 (24.9%) people had a bachelor's or higher degree, 1,044 (57.0%) had a post-high school certificate or diploma, and 330 (18.0%) people exclusively held high school qualifications. The median income was $37,700, compared with $41,500 nationally. 153 people (8.4%) earned over $100,000 compared to 12.1% nationally. The employment status of those at least 15 was 828 (45.2%) full-time, 297 (16.2%) part-time, and 54 (3.0%) unemployed.

== Education ==
Durie Hill School is a co-educational state primary school for Year 1 to 8 students, with a roll of 188 as of July 2026. It opened in 1873 as Mars Hill School. At the end of 1911 it moved to its present site in Durie Hill and took its current name.
