= Tawhero =

Suburb of Whanganui

- Suburb
- Interactive map of Tawhero
- Coordinates: 39.936363°S 175.015738°E
- Country: New Zealand
- City: Whanganui
- Local authority: Whanganui District Council

Area
  - Land: 164 ha (410 acres)

Population (June 2025)
  - Total: 3,200
  - Density: 2,000/km^{2} (5,100/sq mi)

	Springvale	College Estate
Castlecliff	Tawhero	Gonville
	Castlecliff	Gonville

Tawhero is a suburb of Whanganui, in the Whanganui District and Manawatū-Whanganui region of New Zealand's North Island.

The name can mean the tōwai or kāmahi trees.

== Demographics ==
Titoki statistical area, which corresponds to Tawhero, covers 1.64 km^{2} (0.63 sq mi) and had an estimated population of 3,200 as of June 2025, with a population density of 1,951 people per km^{2}.

Historical population
Year	Pop.	±% p.a.
2006	2,721	—
2013	2,472	−1.36%
2018	2,841	+2.82%
2023	3,066	+1.54%
The 2006 population is for a larger area of 1.92 km^{2}. Source:

Titoki had a population of 3,066 in the 2023 New Zealand census, an increase of 225 people (7.9%) since the 2018 census, and an increase of 594 people (24.0%) since the 2013 census. There were 1,497 males, 1,563 females, and 6 people of other genders in 1,128 dwellings. 2.3% of people identified as LGBTIQ+. The median age was 38.1 years (compared with 38.1 years nationally). There were 681 people (22.2%) aged under 15 years, 534 (17.4%) aged 15 to 29, 1,257 (41.0%) aged 30 to 64, and 597 (19.5%) aged 65 or older.

People could identify as more than one ethnicity. The results were 66.5% European (Pākehā); 38.7% Māori; 7.6% Pasifika; 6.3% Asian; 0.7% Middle Eastern, Latin American and African New Zealanders (MELAA); and 2.9% other, which includes people giving their ethnicity as "New Zealander". English was spoken by 96.6%, Māori by 11.4%, Samoan by 1.9%, and other languages by 6.5%. No language could be spoken by 2.2% (e.g. too young to talk). New Zealand Sign Language was known by 0.9%. The percentage of people born overseas was 11.4, compared with 28.8% nationally.

Religious affiliations were 29.8% Christian, 0.9% Hindu, 0.3% Islam, 5.0% Māori religious beliefs, 0.4% Buddhist, 0.6% New Age, and 0.8% other religions. People who answered that they had no religion were 53.3%, and 9.2% of people did not answer the census question.

Of those at least 15 years old, 261 (10.9%) people had a bachelor's or higher degree, 1,353 (56.7%) had a post-high school certificate or diploma, and 774 (32.5%) people exclusively held high school qualifications. The median income was $31,100, compared with $41,500 nationally. 84 people (3.5%) earned over $100,000 compared to 12.1% nationally. The employment status of those at least 15 was 981 (41.1%) full-time, 270 (11.3%) part-time, and 96 (4.0%) unemployed.

== Education ==
Tawhero School is a state primary school for Year 1 to 8 students, with a roll of 150. Some students are taught in the Māori language. It opened in 1926.

St Marcellin School is a state-integrated Catholic primary school for Year 1 to 8 students, with a roll of 47. It began as an intermediate school (Years 7 and 8). When St Anthony's Primary School in Gonville closed in 1983, it became a full primary school.

Te Kura Waenga o Rutherford | Rutherford Intermediate School is a state intermediate school, with a roll of 143. It has also been called Rutherford Junior High School. It opened in 1963.

All these schools are co-educational. Rolls are as of July 2025.
