= Springvale, New Zealand =

Suburb of Whanganui

Springvale
- Suburb
- Interactive map of Springvale
- Coordinates: 39.922497°S 175.024286°E
- Country: New Zealand
- City: Whanganui
- Local authority: Whanganui District Council

Area
  - Land: 270 ha (670 acres)

Population (June 2025)
  - Total: 3,730
  - Density: 1,400/km^{2} (3,600/sq mi)

Westmere	Otamatea	St Johns Hill
	Springvale
Castlecliff	Tawhero	College Estate

Springvale is a suburb of Whanganui, in the Whanganui District and Manawatū-Whanganui region of New Zealand's North Island.

An extension to the residential urban boundary was proposed in 2018 to provide homes for another 575 homes. The extension faced opposition.

As of 2018, homes in Springvale are among the fastest selling in the country, with the average house taking just 12 days to sell.

In 2019, Whanganui Māori proposed naming a new street Te Repo to recognise the wetlands that previously existed in the area, but the road was ultimately named after local sculptor Joan Morrell.

== Springvale Park ==
Springvale Park is Whanganui's main sports hub, featuring fields, hardwood courts, swimming pools, a stadium and a bike track.

It hosts a range of North Island and national sports fixtures, like basketball and badminton.

The bike park component took 18 months to construct, and was extensively vandalised shortly after opening in December 2018.

== Demographics ==
Springvale covers 2.70 km^{2} (1.04 sq mi) and had an estimated population of 3,730 as of June 2025, with a population density of 1,381 people per km^{2}.

Historical population
Year	Pop.	±% p.a.
2006	3,012	—
2013	3,186	+0.81%
2018	3,438	+1.53%
2023	3,621	+1.04%
The 2006 population is for a smaller area of 2.36 km^{2}. Source:

Springvale had a population of 3,621 in the 2023 New Zealand census, an increase of 183 people (5.3%) since the 2018 census, and an increase of 435 people (13.7%) since the 2013 census. There were 1,656 males, 1,953 females, and 12 people of other genders in 1,530 dwellings. 2.6% of people identified as LGBTIQ+. The median age was 47.3 years (compared with 38.1 years nationally). There were 633 people (17.5%) aged under 15 years, 516 (14.3%) aged 15 to 29, 1,434 (39.6%) aged 30 to 64, and 1,032 (28.5%) aged 65 or older.

People could identify as more than one ethnicity. The results were 81.0% European (Pākehā); 16.9% Māori; 3.2% Pasifika; 9.3% Asian; 0.7% Middle Eastern, Latin American and African New Zealanders (MELAA); and 2.7% other, which includes people giving their ethnicity as "New Zealander". English was spoken by 97.1%, Māori by 3.4%, Samoan by 0.7%, and other languages by 8.5%. No language could be spoken by 1.7% (e.g. too young to talk). New Zealand Sign Language was known by 0.6%. The percentage of people born overseas was 16.9, compared with 28.8% nationally.

Religious affiliations were 38.7% Christian, 1.2% Hindu, 0.2% Islam, 1.6% Māori religious beliefs, 0.7% Buddhist, 0.3% New Age, 0.1% Jewish, and 2.0% other religions. People who answered that they had no religion were 48.8%, and 6.5% of people did not answer the census question.

Of those at least 15 years old, 543 (18.2%) people had a bachelor's or higher degree, 1,680 (56.2%) had a post-high school certificate or diploma, and 765 (25.6%) people exclusively held high school qualifications. The median income was $34,600, compared with $41,500 nationally. 186 people (6.2%) earned over $100,000 compared to 12.1% nationally. The employment status of those at least 15 was 1,284 (43.0%) full-time, 465 (15.6%) part-time, and 60 (2.0%) unemployed.

Individual statistical areas
Name	Area (km^{2})	Population	Density (per km^{2})	Dwellings	Median age	Median income
Springvale North	1.28	426	333	174	54.3 years	$39,700
Springvale West	0.79	1,608	2,038	687	48.1 years	$33,200
Springvale East	0.63	1,587	2,516	669	44.2 years	$35,300
New Zealand					38.1 years	$41,500

== Education ==
Mosston School is a state primary school for Year 1 to 6 students, with a roll of 173. It opened in 1878.

Faith City School is a state-integrated Christian primary school for Year 1 to 8 students, with a roll of 157. It started in 1979 as Wanganui Christian Academy for Year 1 to 13, and was later called Springvale Christian Academy and Faith Academy. The secondary section closed in 1989, but third and fourth forms were taught between 1992 and 1994. It became state-integrated in 1995.

Both these schools are co-educational. Rolls are as of July 2026.

The Springvale Playcentre opened in 1968 and celebrated its 50th anniversary in 2018.
