= Emily White (gardener) =

New Zealand gardener and writer

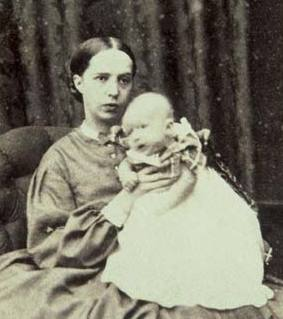
- White with one of her five children, c. 1865
- Born: Emily Louisa Merielina Rogers; May 1, 1839; Beyton, Suffolk, England
- Died: September 18, 1936 (aged 97); Wanganui, New Zealand
- Resting place: Turakina Cemetery, Wanganui
- Occupations: Gardener; writer
- Spouses: John Hannath Marshall (m. 1863; died 1879) Hamilton Blanco White (m. 1881; died 1888)
- Children: 5
- Writing career
- Pen name: A Suffolk Lady
- Notable works: My New Zealand Garden, by A Suffolk Lady

Emily Louisa Merielina White (née Rogers; 1 May 1839 – 18 September 1936) was a New Zealand gardener and writer. She contributed to community life in New Zealand and was one of New Zealand's first notable gardening authors.

== Early life and family ==
White was born in Beyton, Suffolk, in 1839. She was the daughter of Michael Rogers, a clergyman, and his wife Emily Blake, and was descended from notable botanist Thomas Gage. She grew up in various vicarages and manor houses, and enjoyed exploring the countryside with her brothers as a child. Her father died in 1848 and her mother died in 1859, after which she lived with her maternal aunt and uncle at Bury St Edmunds, where she began to take an interest in gardening.

On 6 August 1863 she married John Hannath Marshall, a tutor at King Edward VI Free Grammar School, and they went on to have four sons and a daughter. In 1864 her husband became a clergyman and the family moved between various residences in East Anglia, Cambridgeshire, Devon and Cornwall. In each new residence she continued gardening and developed an interest in exotic plants. In 1876 the family emigrated to New Zealand, seeking a cure for her husband's advanced tuberculosis, and settled on a farm near Motueka. After her husband died in 1879, she returned to England with the children, where she married her second husband, Hamilton Blanco White. He was a former neighbour from Motueka who had followed her to England to convince her to marry him.

== Return to New Zealand ==
In 1882, White and her second husband returned to New Zealand with her children, where she purchased a 13-acre property at St Johns Hill, Wanganui, and built a large fourteen-room house called Grove House. Her second marriage ended unhappily after only two or three years, and her estranged husband moved to Australia where he died in 1888.

White's garden at Grove House became known for its rare plants, both native and exotic, and attracted both local and international visitors between 1883 and 1905. It was a sizeable garden and in a formal style, featuring an orchard, a house cow and a croquet court. She introduced a number of species into New Zealand including the scarlet gerbera and the climbing buddleja, both from South Africa. She also made efforts to beautify the streets of Wanganui by planting red flowering gum and pōhutukawa trees.

She was a member and patron of the Wanganui Horticultural Society, and an active supporter of the SPCA, the Women's Christian Temperance Union and the Anglican church. She was also close friends with Ellen Ballance, the wife of New Zealand premier John Ballance, and participated in women's rights campaigns and welfare work. She purchased and donated the land for Wanganui's first orphanage.

In 1902, White published a book of reminiscences and stories about her garden called My New Zealand Garden, by A Suffolk Lady. The book was published in at least three editions in New Zealand by A. D. Willis of Wanganui. In 1903, after the sudden death of one of her sons, she subdivided the property at Grove House and built herself a smaller house in the garden. She then travelled to England with another son to arrange the English edition of her book, which was published in 1905 with black and white photographs. She returned to New Zealand that year, sold her Wanganui property and moved to Marton to live with her children, where she created a beautiful garden featuring trees imported from Melbourne.

After the First World War she moved with her daughter to a small property in Wanganui East. She became known as Granny White, continued to garden and was a familiar and active figure in the area. Her children included a headmaster of Wanganui Collegiate School, a chaplain and a geologist.

== Legacy ==
In 1990, a new edition of White's book was edited and illustrated by Kerry Carman, and published under the title Emily's Garden: The Colonial New Zealand Garden of a Suffolk Lady.

In June 2017, contractors digging a new water main at the old Grove House property unearthed remains of White's garden, including a brick drain. Archeologists were brought in and found a brick-lined well and other pre-1900 artefacts. At that time, the owners of the property said that the property still featured an Illawarra flame tree planted by White and mentioned in her book.
