= St Johns Hill =

Suburb of Whanganui, New Zealand

- Suburb
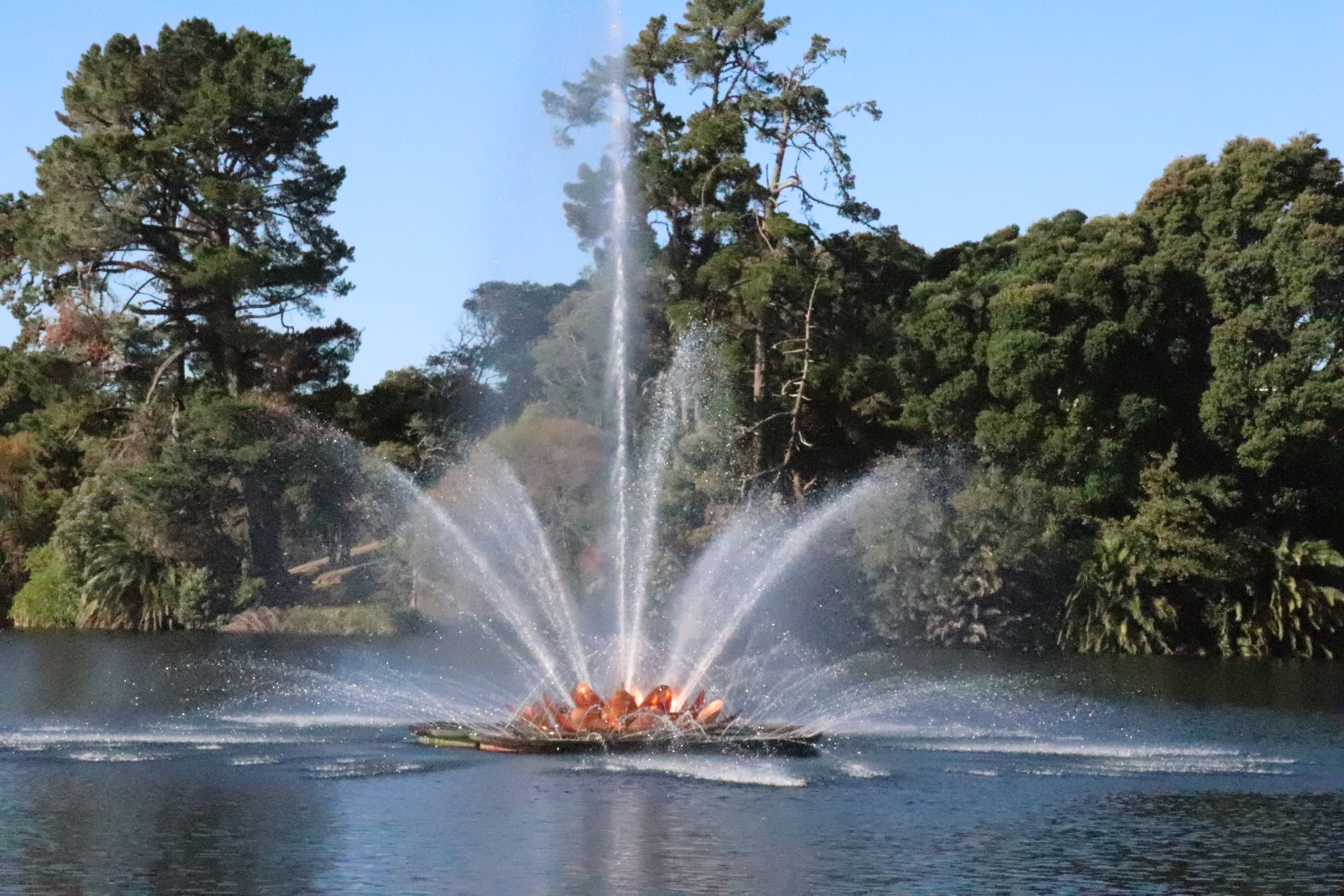
- The Higginbottom Fountain at Virginia Lake Reserve
- Interactive map of St Johns Hill
- Coordinates: 39.916764°S 175.037380°E
- Country: New Zealand
- City: Whanganui
- Local authority: Whanganui District Council

Area
  - Land: 225 ha (560 acres)

Population (June 2025)
  - Total: 3,440
  - Density: 1,530/km^{2} (3,960/sq mi)

Otamatea		Aramoho
	St Johns Hill
Springvale	College Estate	Whanganui Central

St Johns Hill is a suburb of Whanganui, in the Whanganui District and Manawatū-Whanganui region of New Zealand's North Island.

== Demographics ==
St Johns Hill covers 2.25 km^{2} (0.87 sq mi) and had an estimated population of 3,440 as of June 2025, with a population density of 1,529 people per km^{2}.

Historical population
Year	Pop.	±% p.a.
2006	3,096	—
2013	3,144	+0.22%
2018	3,375	+1.43%
2023	3,396	+0.12%

St Johns Hill had a population of 3,396 in the 2023 New Zealand census, an increase of 21 people (0.6%) since the 2018 census, and an increase of 252 people (8.0%) since the 2013 census. There were 1,524 males, 1,860 females, and 12 people of other genders in 1,431 dwellings. 2.6% of people identified as LGBTIQ+. The median age was 52.6 years (compared with 38.1 years nationally). There were 528 people (15.5%) aged under 15 years, 417 (12.3%) aged 15 to 29, 1,305 (38.4%) aged 30 to 64, and 1,149 (33.8%) aged 65 or older.

People could identify as more than one ethnicity. The results were 86.8% European (Pākehā); 14.1% Māori; 1.8% Pasifika; 5.5% Asian; 1.1% Middle Eastern, Latin American and African New Zealanders (MELAA); and 3.6% other, which includes people giving their ethnicity as "New Zealander". English was spoken by 97.9%, Māori by 3.4%, Samoan by 0.2%, and other languages by 8.9%. No language could be spoken by 1.5% (e.g. too young to talk). New Zealand Sign Language was known by 0.4%. The percentage of people born overseas was 19.4, compared with 28.8% nationally.

Religious affiliations were 41.4% Christian, 0.8% Hindu, 0.4% Islam, 1.3% Māori religious beliefs, 1.0% Buddhist, 0.3% New Age, 0.4% Jewish, and 0.9% other religions. People who answered that they had no religion were 46.6%, and 7.1% of people did not answer the census question.

Of those at least 15 years old, 741 (25.8%) people had a bachelor's or higher degree, 1,515 (52.8%) had a post-high school certificate or diploma, and 615 (21.4%) people exclusively held high school qualifications. The median income was $34,800, compared with $41,500 nationally. 351 people (12.2%) earned over $100,000 compared to 12.1% nationally. The employment status of those at least 15 was 1,155 (40.3%) full-time, 363 (12.7%) part-time, and 48 (1.7%) unemployed.

Individual statistical areas
Name	Area (km^{2})	Population	Density (per km^{2})	Dwellings	Median age	Median income
St Johns Hill East	1.12	1,158	1,031	510	61.1 years	$29,600
St Johns Hill West	1.12	2,235	2,235	918	49.3 years	$37,600
New Zealand					38.1 years	$41,500

== Education ==
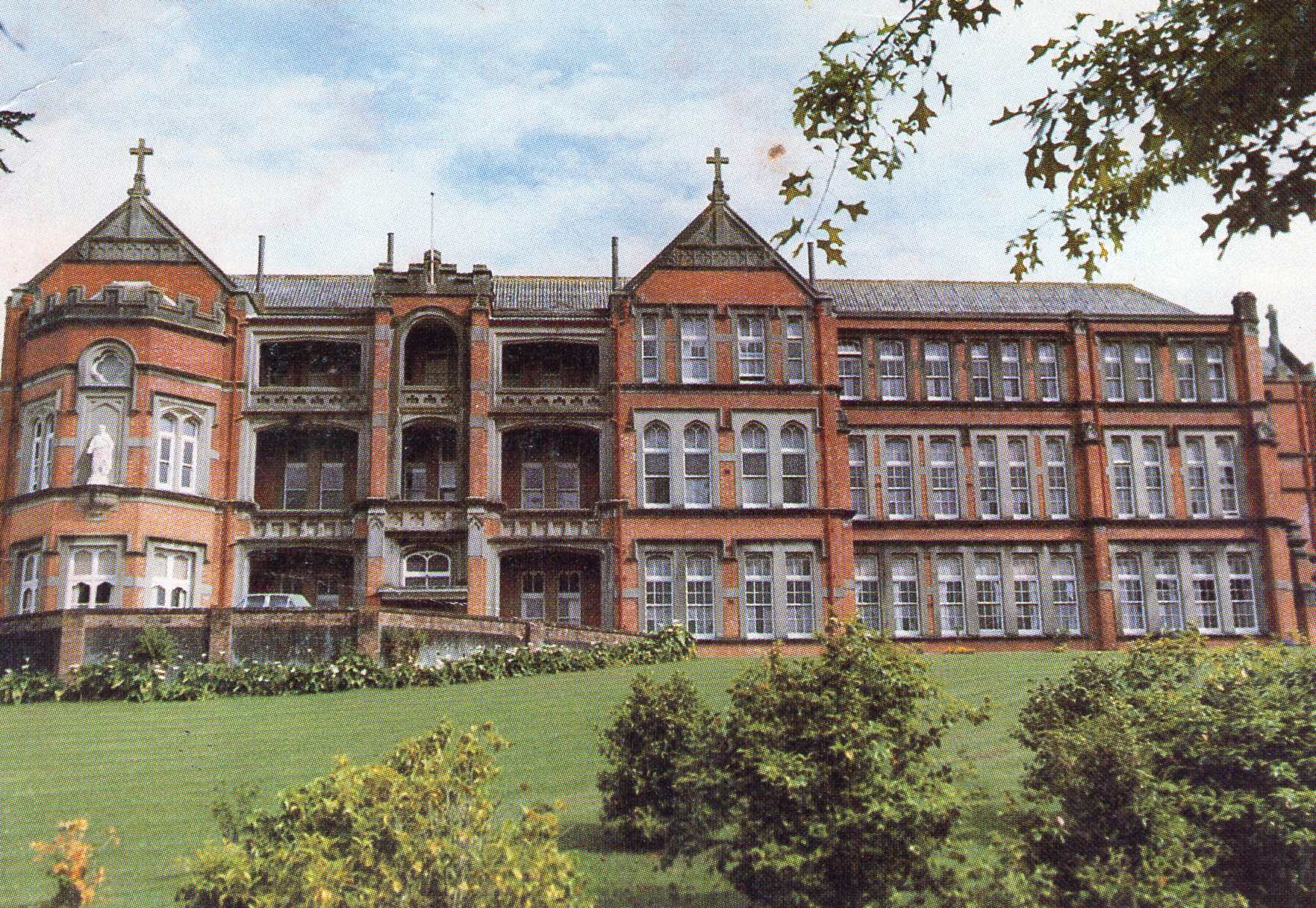
Sacred Heart College in the 1970s (now Cullinane College)

St Johns Hill School is a state primary school for Year 1 to 6 students, with a roll of 404. The school opened in 1929, but there were predecessors from 1901.

St Mary's School is a state-integrated primary school for Year 1 to 8 students, with a roll of 241. It opened in 1919 on Victoria Avenue in the central city, moved to Grey Street in 1927 and then to Wicksteed Street in 1964. It moved to Aramoho in 1988, on a site occupied by Holy Infancy (later St Joseph's) school from 1899 to 1979.

Cullinane College is a state-integrated secondary school, with a roll of 495. It opened in 2003 from a merge of Sacred Heart Girls College (established 1912 with a predecessor from 1880) and St Augustine's [Boys] College (established 1944).

Both these schools are co-educational. Rolls are as of July 2026.

== Parks ==
Rotokawau Virginia Lake, located on St John's Hill, is a historic lake with a fountain, Art Deco conservatory and winter garden.

== Notable people ==
- James K. Baxter, poet and playwright, attended St Johns Hill School in 1936
- Emily White started a garden on her large property on St Johns Hill in 1882; it gained international renown

== See also ==
- St John's railway station, 1881-1960
