= Gonville, New Zealand =

Suburb of Whanganui

Gonville
- Suburb
- Interactive map of Gonville
- Coordinates: 39°57′S 175°01′E
- Country: New Zealand
- City: Whanganui
- Local authority: Whanganui District Council

Area
  - Land: 362 ha (890 acres)

Population (June 2025)
  - Total: 6,670
  - Density: 1,840/km^{2} (4,770/sq mi)
- Hospitals: Whanganui Hospital

Springvale	College Estate	Whanganui Central
Tawhero	Gonville
Castlecliff	(Whanganui River), Whanganui Airport	Putiki

Gonville is a residential suburb of Whanganui, New Zealand. It is under the local governance of the Whanganui District Council.

== St Anthony's Chapel ==
St Anthony's Chapel is a Romanesque church on York Street. In the 1920s Gonville was a growing part of the city and Catholic parishioners in the suburb wished to build a church hall and began fundraising. Clifford Newton Hood was hired as the architect and the church was completed in 1925 at a cost of £3,734. On 10 April 1925 St Anthony's Primary School was opened in the hall. In 1930 the school moved to a building behind the church and the building was exclusively used for worship. In 1983 St Anthony's Primary School closed; 4 years later the Josephites left St Anthony's after their property was sold. The church was also put up for sale but the local parishioners purchased the site against the wishes of the Diocesan bishop. The parishioners were affiliated with the Society of St Pius X who continue to own and manage the site. The site currently houses a primary school, St. Dominic's College, and the Dominican Sisters convent. St Anthony's draws parishioners from across the wider region, who come for the traditional Latin Mass offered at St Anthony's.

== Demographics ==
Gonville covers 3.62 km^{2} (1.40 sq mi) and had an estimated population of 6,670 as of June 2025, with a population density of 1,843 people per km^{2}.

Historical population
Year	Pop.	±% p.a.
2006	6,153	—
2013	5,934	−0.52%
2018	6,273	+1.12%
2023	6,459	+0.59%

Gonville had a population of 6,459 in the 2023 New Zealand census, an increase of 186 people (3.0%) since the 2018 census, and an increase of 525 people (8.8%) since the 2013 census. There were 3,144 males, 3,288 females, and 27 people of other genders in 2,532 dwellings. 3.3% of people identified as LGBTIQ+. The median age was 38.4 years (compared with 38.1 years nationally). There were 1,353 people (20.9%) aged under 15 years, 1,242 (19.2%) aged 15 to 29, 2,730 (42.3%) aged 30 to 64, and 1,140 (17.6%) aged 65 or older.

People could identify as more than one ethnicity. The results were 73.4% European (Pākehā); 34.8% Māori; 6.0% Pasifika; 5.2% Asian; 0.3% Middle Eastern, Latin American and African New Zealanders (MELAA); and 3.0% other, which includes people giving their ethnicity as "New Zealander". English was spoken by 97.1%, Māori by 9.7%, Samoan by 0.9%, and other languages by 5.5%. No language could be spoken by 2.0% (e.g. too young to talk). New Zealand Sign Language was known by 0.9%. The percentage of people born overseas was 11.8, compared with 28.8% nationally.

Religious affiliations were 31.7% Christian, 0.8% Hindu, 0.3% Islam, 4.0% Māori religious beliefs, 0.5% Buddhist, 0.7% New Age, and 1.5% other religions. People who answered that they had no religion were 52.5%, and 8.3% of people did not answer the census question.

Of those at least 15 years old, 696 (13.6%) people had a bachelor's or higher degree, 2,880 (56.4%) had a post-high school certificate or diploma, and 1,530 (30.0%) people exclusively held high school qualifications. The median income was $30,300, compared with $41,500 nationally. 171 people (3.3%) earned over $100,000 compared to 12.1% nationally. The employment status of those at least 15 was 2,211 (43.3%) full-time, 690 (13.5%) part-time, and 237 (4.6%) unemployed.

Individual statistical areas
Name	Area (km^{2})	Population	Density (per km^{2})	Dwellings	Median age	Median income
Gonville West	0.74	1,761	2,380	675	36.4 years	$28,000
Gonville North	1.34	2,652	1,979	1,065	37.5 years	$32,400
Gonville South	1.54	2,049	1,331	789	41.7 years	$31,000
New Zealand					38.1 years	$41,500

== Education ==
Gonville School is a co-educational state primary school for Year 1 to 6 students, with a roll of 150 as of March 2026. It opened in 1906.

Arahunga School is a specialist school catering for students up to 21 years old, with a roll of 113.

St Anthony's School is a private co-educational Catholic primary school for Year 1 to 6 students. It shares a site with the private Catholic Boys' college, St Augustine's. The two schools have a roll of 90. St Anthony's opened in 1994.

St. Dominic's College is a private girls' Catholic secondary school for Years 7 to 13, on an adjacent site to St Anthony's and St Augustine's. with a roll of 50. It opened in 1999.
