= College Estate =

Suburb of Whanganui

- Suburb
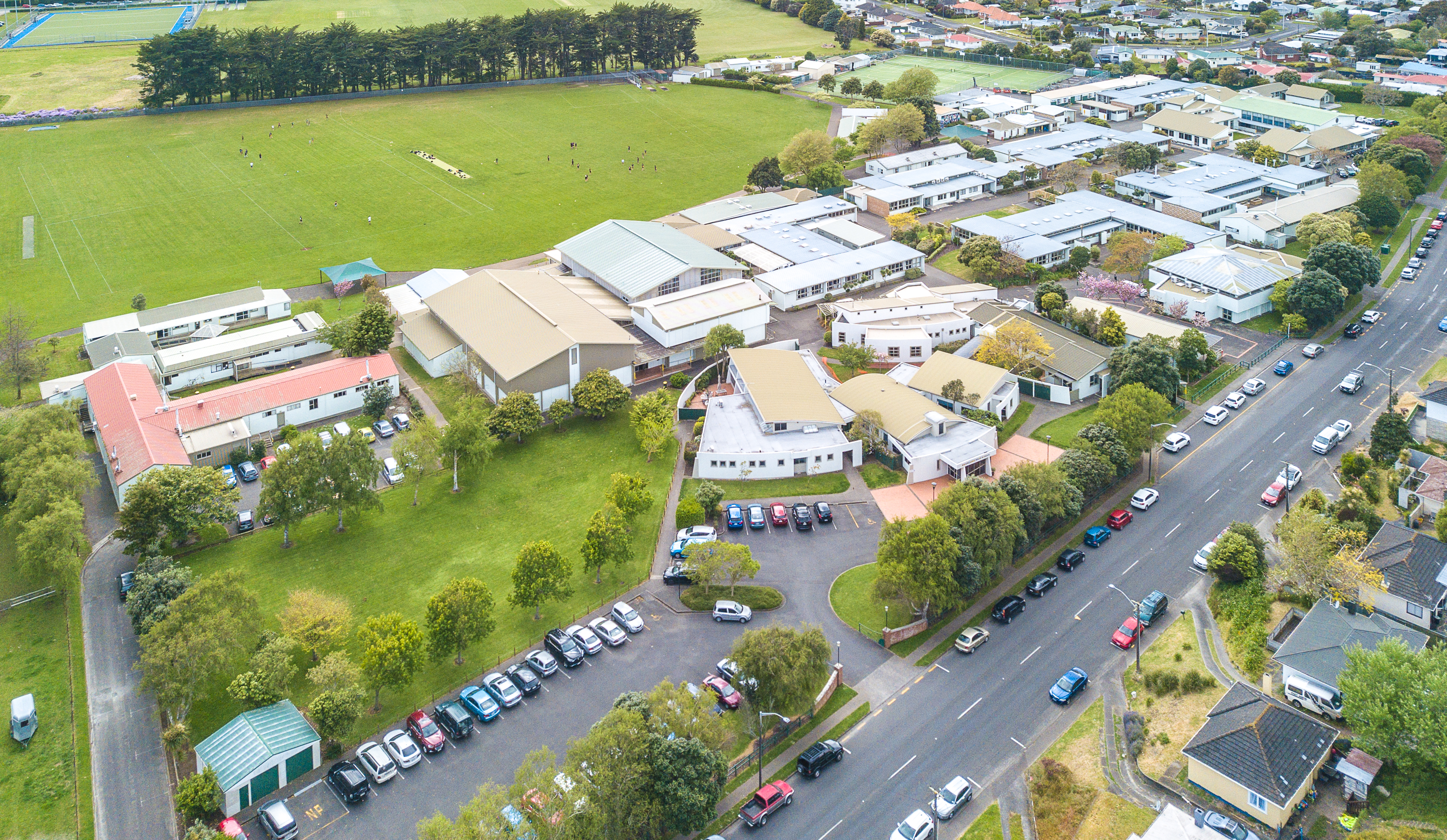
- Whanganui High School
- Interactive map of College Estate
- Coordinates: 39.934753°S 175.038357°E
- Country: New Zealand
- City: Whanganui
- Local authority: Whanganui District Council

Area
  - Land: 135 ha (330 acres)

Population (June 2025)
  - Total: 1,310
  - Density: 970/km^{2} (2,510/sq mi)

	St Johns Hill
Springvale	College Estate	Whanganui Central
	Gonville

College Estate is a suburb of Whanganui, in the Whanganui District and Manawatū-Whanganui region of New Zealand's North Island.

== Demographics ==
College Estate covers 1.35 km^{2} (0.52 sq mi) and had an estimated population of 1,310 as of June 2025, with a population density of 970 people per km^{2}.

Historical population
Year	Pop.	±% p.a.
2006	1,116	—
2013	1,143	+0.34%
2018	1,284	+2.35%
2023	1,278	−0.09%

College Estate had a population of 1,278 in the 2023 New Zealand census, a decrease of 6 people (−0.5%) since the 2018 census, and an increase of 135 people (11.8%) since the 2013 census. There were 618 males, 654 females, and 3 people of other genders in 489 dwellings. 2.6% of people identified as LGBTIQ+. The median age was 42.2 years (compared with 38.1 years nationally). There were 237 people (18.5%) aged under 15 years, 225 (17.6%) aged 15 to 29, 522 (40.8%) aged 30 to 64, and 288 (22.5%) aged 65 or older.

People could identify as more than one ethnicity. The results were 81.9% European (Pākehā); 22.1% Māori; 4.2% Pasifika; 7.0% Asian; 0.5% Middle Eastern, Latin American and African New Zealanders (MELAA); and 4.2% other, which includes people giving their ethnicity as "New Zealander". English was spoken by 97.4%, Māori by 5.4%, Samoan by 0.5%, and other languages by 8.2%. No language could be spoken by 1.4% (e.g. too young to talk). New Zealand Sign Language was known by 1.6%. The percentage of people born overseas was 16.4, compared with 28.8% nationally.

Religious affiliations were 35.0% Christian, 1.2% Hindu, 2.1% Māori religious beliefs, 0.7% Buddhist, 0.9% New Age, and 1.6% other religions. People who answered that they had no religion were 51.4%, and 7.3% of people did not answer the census question.

Of those at least 15 years old, 231 (22.2%) people had a bachelor's or higher degree, 561 (53.9%) had a post-high school certificate or diploma, and 243 (23.3%) people exclusively held high school qualifications. The median income was $31,700, compared with $41,500 nationally. 81 people (7.8%) earned over $100,000 compared to 12.1% nationally. The employment status of those at least 15 was 414 (39.8%) full-time, 147 (14.1%) part-time, and 30 (2.9%) unemployed.

== Education ==
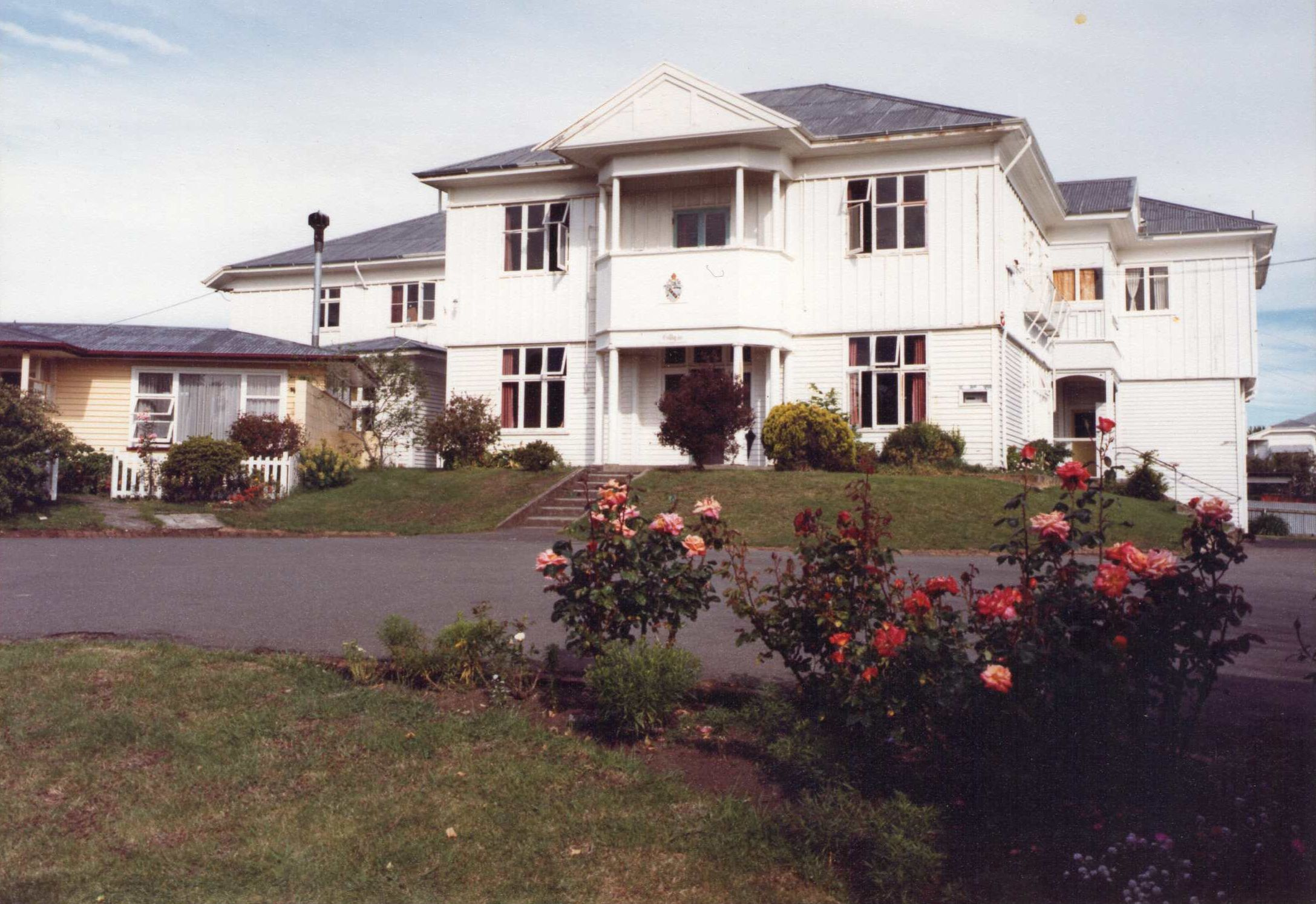
Gilligan House, Collegiate School in the 1980s

=== Public education ===
Carlton School is a state primary school for Year 1 to 6 students, with a roll of 263. It opened in 1957.

Whanganui Intermediate is a state intermediate school, with a roll of 458. It opened in 1933.

Whanganui High School is a state secondary school, with a roll of 1416. It opened in 1958.

Whanganui City College is another state secondary school, with a roll of 304. It opened as Wanganui Technical College in 1911. Because student numbers were too high for the facilities, girls were phased out between 1957 and 1962, and the school changed its name to Wanganui Boys College in 1964. It became co-educational again with the adoption of its current name in 1994.

=== Private education ===
St George's Preparatory School is a state-integrated Anglican primary school, with a roll of 155 as of July 2025. It opened in 1927 in Grey Street, and moved to a shared campus with Whanganui Collegiate in 2017.

Whanganui Collegiate School is a state-integrated secondary school, with a roll of 412. It opened in 1854.

All these schools are co-educational. Rolls are as of July 2025.
