= Rangiotu =

- Village
- Interactive map of Rangiotu
- Coordinates: 40.421302°S 175.435139°E
- Country: New Zealand
- Region: Manawatū-Whanganui region
- Territorial authority: Manawatū District
- Ward: Manawatū Rural General Ward; Ngā Tapuae o Matangi Māori Ward
- Electorates: Rangitīkei; Te Tai Hauāuru (Māori)

Government
  - Territorial Authority: Manawatū District Council
  - Regional council: Horizons Regional Council
  - Mayor of Manawatu: Michael Ford
  - Rangitīkei MP: Suze Redmayne
  - Te Tai Hauāuru MP: Debbie Ngarewa-Packer

Area
  - Total: 30.14 km^{2} (11.64 sq mi)

Population (2023 Census)
  - Total: 243
  - Density: 8.06/km^{2} (20.9/sq mi)

Rangiotu is a farming community in the Manawatū District and Manawatū-Whanganui region in New Zealand's central North Island.

It is located on the Oroua River, just north of where the river meets Manawatū River, and 12 kilometres (7.5 mi) south-east if Himatangi.

The settlement was known for many years as Oroua Bridge, but was renamed Rangiotu in honour of the local Rangitāne chief, Hoani Meihana Te Rangiotu.

Te Rangimarie Marae was built in 1858 to commemorate peace between Ngāti Raukawa and Rangitāne. The marae currently runs programmes for schools, teaching the Māori history of Manawatū.

Rangiotu is part of the Taikorea statistical area, which also includes Glen Oroua.

== History ==
=== Early history ===
A school was built at Oroua Bridge in 1896 on 2 acres of land gifted by Enereta Te Rangiotu. It later changed its name to Rangiotu School. It closed in 1996.

Rangiotu Memorial Hall was opened on 18 October 1905 as a basic square building, using donations from the local community.

In 1915, Manawaroa Te Awe Awe allowed the Government to use part of his farm as a military training camp for World War I, to replace the Trentham Military Camp that had to be evacuated. An engineer laid out the camp, to ensure it did not have the same draining, sanitation and water supply issues as Trentham. The camp was originally based on the Rangiotu School, and Rangiotu Memorial Hall was expanded to help accommodate the soldiers.

The camp was later moved by hand one mile west, opposite Pyke's Road. The 3000-acre site could accommodate 2000 men, with a ban on wheeled vehicles to avoid cutting up the land. A photograph of the camp, held in the collection of the National Library of New Zealand, shows rows of cone tents laid out across a flat field.

=== Post-war history ===
The memorial hall was extended again in 1945 to welcome soldiers returning from World War II.

Te Rangimarie Marae opened in 1858.

In 1976, plans were drawn up for a playing field and speedway in Rangiotu, near the Hikatoto burial ground and Te Rangimarie Marae. A sound barrier was proposed as a way of reducing noise.

In 1996, the Government closed down the Rangiotu School, with a roll of 24 pupils and four classrooms, as part of nationwide closures. The Government agreed to a request from Te Awe Awe family to return the donated school land back to Rangitāne ownership.

== Demographics ==
Rangiotu locality covers 30.41 km^{2} (11.74 sq mi). It is part of the larger Taikorea statistical area.

Historical population
Year	Pop.	±% p.a.
2006	234	—
2013	234	+0.00%
2018	234	+0.00%
2023	243	+0.76%

Rangiotu had a population of 243 in the 2023 New Zealand census, an increase of 9 people (3.8%) since the 2018 census, and an increase of 9 people (3.8%) since the 2013 census. There were 120 males and 123 females in 96 dwellings. 2.5% of people identified as LGBTIQ+. There were 63 people (25.9%) aged under 15 years, 30 (12.3%) aged 15 to 29, 114 (46.9%) aged 30 to 64, and 45 (18.5%) aged 65 or older.

People could identify as more than one ethnicity. The results were 91.4% European (Pākehā), 19.8% Māori, 3.7% Pasifika, 1.2% Asian, and 2.5% other, which includes people giving their ethnicity as "New Zealander". English was spoken by 98.8%, Māori by 1.2%, and other languages by 2.5%. No language could be spoken by 3.7% (e.g. too young to talk). The percentage of people born overseas was 8.6, compared with 28.8% nationally.

Religious affiliations were 27.2% Christian, 1.2% New Age, and 1.2% other religions. People who answered that they had no religion were 63.0%, and 9.9% of people did not answer the census question.

Of those at least 15 years old, 33 (18.3%) people had a bachelor's or higher degree, 108 (60.0%) had a post-high school certificate or diploma, and 39 (21.7%) people exclusively held high school qualifications. 12 people (6.7%) earned over $100,000 compared to 12.1% nationally. The employment status of those at least 15 was 93 (51.7%) full-time, 36 (20.0%) part-time, and 6 (3.3%) unemployed.

== Facilities ==
Rangiotu Memorial Hall has a capacity for 110 people and hosts Anzac Day services, a weekly craft club, an annual community Christmas Party, and school and private events. It has also acted as a Civil Defence Centre during several floods.

Rangiotu also has a war memorial, commemorating about 60 local men who died during World War I and World War II.

== Education ==
Bainesse School is a co-educational state primary school for Year 1 to 8 students, with a roll of 79 as of July 2026. It opened in 1913.
