= Makuri, New Zealand =

Locality in Manawatū-Whanganui, New Zealand

Makuri
- Interactive map of Makuri
- Coordinates: 40.532730°S 176.013497°E
- Country: New Zealand
- Region: Manawatū-Whanganui
- Territorial authority: Tararua District
- Ward: South Tararua General Ward; Tamaki nui-a Rua Maori Ward
- Electorates: Wairarapa; Ikaroa-Rāwhiti (Māori)

Government
  - Territorial Authority: Tararua District Council
  - Regional council: Horizons Regional Council
  - Tararua Mayor: Scott Gilmore
  - Wairarapa MP: TBD
  - Ikaroa-Rāwhiti MP: Cushla Tangaere-Manuel

Area
  - Total: 583.12 km^{2} (225.14 sq mi)

Population (June 2025)
  - Total: 650
  - Density: 1.1/km^{2} (2.9/sq mi)
- Time zone: UTC+12 (NZST)
  - Summer (DST): UTC+13 (NZDT)
- Postcode: 4989

Makuri is a farming community in Tararua District and Manawatū-Whanganui region of New Zealand's North Island.

The area features dusty gravel roads, a bush-clad gorge valley, and sheep farms on the rolling green surrounding hills. It is about an hour's drive from Palmerston North, between Pahiatua and Pongaroa.

A walking track has been established through the Makuri Gorge which takes about one hour to complete.

== History ==
=== 19th century ===
European settlers began farming the area in the late 19th century.

In 1889, Walter Tylee took control of 1200 acres of dense bush. The site was only accessible by a rough ten-mile horse track from Pahiatua, covered in two feet of mud during winter. By 1896 most of the property had been cleared for sheep farming. Tylee had been raised and educated in Napier and Nelson, and had travelled to Argentina to learn sheep farming.

In 1890, Frank Anderson purchased a 640-acre property covered in standing bush. By 1896, he had cleared 400 acres for farming sheep. Anderson was born in Wellington in 1870 and was educated at Wellington College and Wanganui College. He was active in establishing the local school and organising social functions.

In 1891, Bertram Harrison began managing the 3000 acre Tuscan Hills Estate. By 1896, 2000 acres had been felled, burnt and sown with grass to accommodate 3500 sheep and 100 cattle. The estate include an orchard and a villa, known as Bungalow House. Harrison had been born in Sydenham, England, in 1868, was educated in Berkhamsted, England, and had spent two years in Scotland and five years in New Zealand before taking over the estate. By 1897, he presided over the newly formed Makuri Cricket Club and was involved in local sports.

By 1897, the area was accessible by coach from Eketahuna railway station or Woodville railway station. The district had a daily mail service, and its nearest telegraph office was at Pahiatua.

=== 20th century ===
A photograph of a farmhouse in Makuri, taken between 1923 and 1928 by Robert Percy Moore, depicts a panoramic view of a farmhouse by pine trees, above a river. There is still some native bush, and a driveway and bridge connecting the house with a main road. In the hills in the background, there are still remains of the farmer's attempts to clear the standing forest.

A New Zealand Railways Department collage poster, compiled about the same time, shows fly-fishing in Makuri as one of 12 examples of what makes New Zealand a "sportsman's paradise".

=== 21st century ===
On 20 January 2014, a 6.2 magnitude earthquake struck the area, leaving a crack down the middle of Pahiatua-Pongaroa Road. It was the most powerful earthquake recorded in New Zealand that year.

In May 2018, a Landcorp's Rangedale Station, a 1380 hectare sheep and beef operation, was infected with Mycoplasma bovis.

== Demography ==
Kaitawa statistical area covers 583.12 km^{2} (225.14 sq mi) and had an estimated population of 650 as of June 2025, with a population density of 1.1 people per km^{2}.

Historical population for Kaitawa statistical area
Year	Pop.	±% p.a.
2006	612	—
2013	606	−0.14%
2018	618	+0.39%
2023	642	+0.76%

Kaitawa had a population of 642 in the 2023 New Zealand census, an increase of 24 people (3.9%) since the 2018 census, and an increase of 36 people (5.9%) since the 2013 census. There were 333 males and 303 females in 237 dwellings. 0.9% of people identified as LGBTIQ+. The median age was 40.3 years (compared with 38.1 years nationally). There were 150 people (23.4%) aged under 15 years, 99 (15.4%) aged 15 to 29, 312 (48.6%) aged 30 to 64, and 78 (12.1%) aged 65 or older.

People could identify as more than one ethnicity. The results were 89.7% European (Pākehā); 15.9% Māori; 1.4% Pasifika; 2.3% Asian; 0.5% Middle Eastern, Latin American and African New Zealanders (MELAA); and 3.7% other, which includes people giving their ethnicity as "New Zealander". English was spoken by 97.7%, Māori by 4.2%, Samoan by 0.5%, and other languages by 1.9%. No language could be spoken by 1.4% (e.g. too young to talk). New Zealand Sign Language was known by 0.9%. The percentage of people born overseas was 10.3, compared with 28.8% nationally.

Religious affiliations were 27.6% Christian, 0.9% Māori religious beliefs, 0.5% New Age, and 0.9% other religions. People who answered that they had no religion were 59.3%, and 10.3% of people did not answer the census question.

Of those at least 15 years old, 66 (13.4%) people had a bachelor's or higher degree, 309 (62.8%) had a post-high school certificate or diploma, and 120 (24.4%) people exclusively held high school qualifications. The median income was $39,800, compared with $41,500 nationally. 45 people (9.1%) earned over $100,000 compared to 12.1% nationally. The employment status of those at least 15 was 261 (53.0%) full-time, 72 (14.6%) part-time, and 12 (2.4%) unemployed.

== Economy ==
In 2018, 5.1% worked in manufacturing, 5.1% worked in construction, 0.9% worked in hospitality, 1.7% worked in transport, 6.0% worked in education, and 6.8% worked in healthcare.

== Transportation ==
As of 2018, among those who commute to work, 45.3% drove a car and 4.3% rode in a car. No one ran, walked, cycled, or commuted by public transport.

== Education ==
Makuri School is a co-educational state primary school for Year 1 to 8 students, with a roll of 14 as of July 2026. It opened in 1895.

In 2009, a Ministry of Education review proposed closing eight of the ten schools in the Tararua bush area, including Makuri School. Makuri was the smallest of the schools at the time, having only six students. The principal said the closure would have been a "tragedy" for the Makuri community.

The school was investigated by the Office of the Auditor-General in 2017 for inappropriately borrowing money.
