= Matiere =

Rural community in New Zealand

- Rural community
- Interactive map of Matiere
- Coordinates: 38.764990°S 175.101457°E
- Country: New Zealand
- Region: Manawatū-Whanganui
- District: Ruapehu District
- Ward: Ruapehu General Ward; Ruapehu Māori Ward
- Community: Taumarunui-Ōhura Community
- Electorates: Taranaki-King Country; Te Tai Hauāuru (Māori)

Government
  - Territorial Authority: Ruapehu District Council
  - Regional council: Horizons Regional Council
  - Mayor of Ruapehu: Weston Kirton
  - Taranaki-King Country MP: Barbara Kuriger
  - Te Tai Hauāuru MP: Debbie Ngarewa-Packer

Area
  - Total: 218.06 km^{2} (84.19 sq mi)

Population (2023 Census)
  - Total: 186
  - Density: 0.853/km^{2} (2.21/sq mi)

Matiere is a rural community in the Ruapehu District and Manawatū-Whanganui region of New Zealand's North Island.

European settlers arrived in the early 1900s, establishing the Matiere School in 1906.

The settlement is now a ghost town, consisting of a small number of homes, former shops and former churches. However, there is still a small but active community.

The former post office has been converted to a business making swings for babies and toddlers. The business supplies just 35 stockists, but Kourtney Kardashian is among its customers. The couple who make the swings live in the former Catholic church, and have turned the former Methodist church into a woodworking workshop.

In September 2018, American forestry company Soper Wheeler Co received regulatory approval to convert a 1148 hectare farm north of the main settlement into a redwood forest.

== Demographics ==
Matiere locality covers 218.06 km^{2} (84.19 sq mi). The locality is part of the larger Otangiwai-Ohura statistical area.

Historical population
Year	Pop.	±% p.a.
2006	201	—
2013	189	−0.88%
2018	180	−0.97%
2023	186	+0.66%

Matiere had a population of 186 in the 2023 New Zealand census, an increase of 6 people (3.3%) since the 2018 census, and a decrease of 3 people (−1.6%) since the 2013 census. There were 93 males and 90 females in 78 dwellings. 1.6% of people identified as LGBTIQ+. The median age was 43.7 years (compared with 38.1 years nationally). There were 42 people (22.6%) aged under 15 years, 21 (11.3%) aged 15 to 29, 84 (45.2%) aged 30 to 64, and 36 (19.4%) aged 65 or older.

People could identify as more than one ethnicity. The results were 71.0% European (Pākehā), 41.9% Māori, 1.6% Pasifika, 3.2% Asian, and 6.5% other, which includes people giving their ethnicity as "New Zealander". English was spoken by 100.0%, Māori by 11.3%, and other languages by 1.6%. The percentage of people born overseas was 4.8, compared with 28.8% nationally.

Religious affiliations were 27.4% Christian, 3.2% Māori religious beliefs, and 1.6% New Age. People who answered that they had no religion were 53.2%, and 16.1% of people did not answer the census question.

Of those at least 15 years old, 12 (8.3%) people had a bachelor's or higher degree, 93 (64.6%) had a post-high school certificate or diploma, and 42 (29.2%) people exclusively held high school qualifications. The median income was $28,900, compared with $41,500 nationally. 6 people (4.2%) earned over $100,000 compared to 12.1% nationally. The employment status of those at least 15 was 69 (47.9%) full-time, 24 (16.7%) part-time, and 6 (4.2%) unemployed.

== Education ==
Matiere School is a co-educational state primary school for Year 1 to 8 students, with a roll of 28 as of July 2026. It opened in 1906. In 2024, the school opened a new main building and playground.
