= Waituna West =

- Village
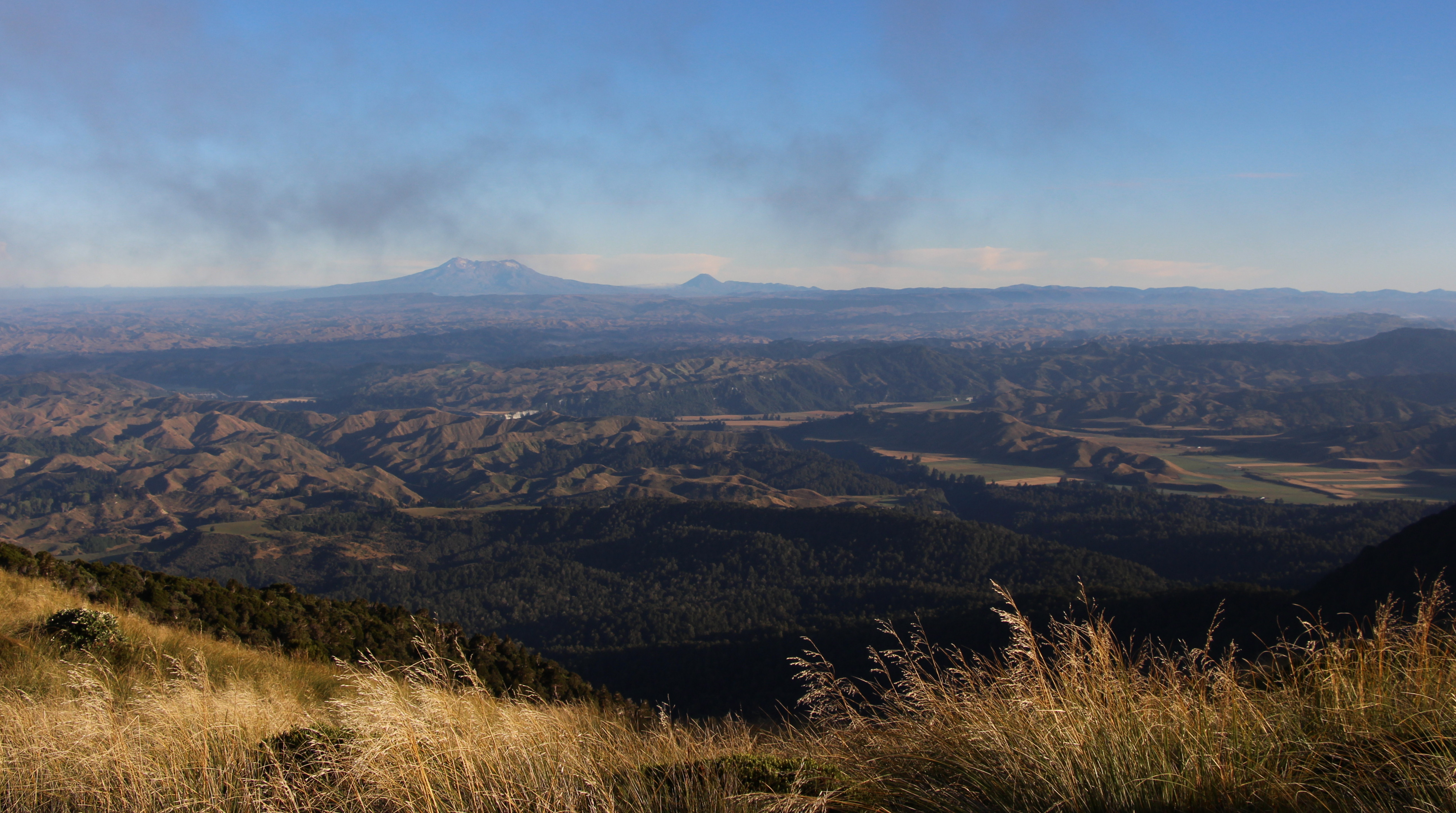
- View from Rangiwahia Hut to Ruapehu in 2016
- Interactive map of Waituna West
- Coordinates: 40.041539°S 175.637898°E
- Country: New Zealand
- Region: Manawatū-Whanganui region
- District: Manawatū District
- Ward: Manawatū Rural General Ward; Ngā Tapuae o Matangi Māori Ward
- Electorates: Rangitīkei; Te Tai Hauāuru (Māori)

Government
  - Territorial Authority: Manawatū District Council
  - Regional council: Horizons Regional Council
  - Mayor of Manawatu: Michael Ford
  - Rangitīkei MP: Suze Redmayne
  - Te Tai Hauāuru MP: Debbie Ngarewa-Packer

Area
  - Territorial: 125.69 km^{2} (48.53 sq mi)

Population (2023 Census)
  - Territorial: 237
  - Density: 1.89/km^{2} (4.88/sq mi)
- Time zone: UTC+12 (NZST)
  - Summer (DST): UTC+13 (NZDT)

Waituna West is a village and rural community in the Manawatū District and Manawatū-Whanganui region in New Zealand's central North Island.

It is located on State Highway 54.

== History ==
=== European settlement ===
English settlers arrived in the late 1880s expecting to see "eternal lush meadows" to farm. They instead encountered endless thick forest, which they cleared over several years with axes and handshaws. The timbers, stump and logs were then burnt. Some of this work was done by cheap labourers on farming cadetships.

A meeting of residents at a stump led to the opening of a school in 1894. The school house was the first public building in the area.

By about 1895, the farming community had its own rugby team. A bridge was also built over the Rangitikei River about this time.

=== Recent history ===
The Hare family, an original English settler family who arrived in Waituna West from Norfolk in the 1880s, was still farming in the area in 2023. The family remained on one farm, Tuatahi, from 1894 to 2017.

Another farm, which has been in the same family since the 1920s, has panoramic views of Mt Ruapehu, Mt Taranaki, and Kapiti Island. Tourists often enter the farm to play with newborn lambs, pitch a tent or play golf.

== Demographics ==
Waituna West locality covers 125.69 km^{2} (48.53 sq mi). It is part of the larger Kiwitea statistical area.

Historical population
Year	Pop.	±% p.a.
2006	225	—
2013	222	−0.19%
2018	222	+0.00%
2023	237	+1.32%

Waituna West locality had a population of 237 in the 2023 New Zealand census, an increase of 15 people (6.8%) since the 2018 census, and an increase of 15 people (6.8%) since the 2013 census. There were 114 males and 117 females in 90 dwellings. 3.8% of people identified as LGBTIQ+. There were 51 people (21.5%) aged under 15 years, 30 (12.7%) aged 15 to 29, 123 (51.9%) aged 30 to 64, and 36 (15.2%) aged 65 or older.

People could identify as more than one ethnicity. The results were 89.9% European (Pākehā), 15.2% Māori, 2.5% Asian, and 2.5% other, which includes people giving their ethnicity as "New Zealander". English was spoken by 97.5%, Māori by 5.1%, and other languages by 2.5%. No language could be spoken by 1.3% (e.g. too young to talk). The percentage of people born overseas was 8.9, compared with 28.8% nationally.

The sole religious affiliation given was 27.8% Christian. People who answered that they had no religion were 59.5%, and 8.9% of people did not answer the census question.

Of those at least 15 years old, 30 (16.1%) people had a bachelor's or higher degree, 108 (58.1%) had a post-high school certificate or diploma, and 45 (24.2%) people exclusively held high school qualifications. 21 people (11.3%) earned over $100,000 compared to 12.1% nationally. The employment status of those at least 15 was 117 (62.9%) full-time, 30 (16.1%) part-time, and 3 (1.6%) unemployed.

== Facilities ==
Waituna West Cemetery, a small cemetery for burials and ash interments, is located in the village. The first recorded burial was in January 1901.

The village also has a community hall, built in 1909. The community raised funds in 1996 to move the hall from the main highway to the school for traffic and pedestrian safety. The present hall has an unsealed carpark, and can accommodate up to 180 people.

== Education ==
Waituna West School is a co-educational state primary school for Year 1 to 8 students, with a roll of 48 as of July 2026.

The school was formed in 1894. Over the years, Tapuae, Pakihikura, Rewa and Dunolly schools were merged into Waituna West School.

The school celebrated its 125th jubilee in 2019 with a three-day event, including a barbeque, tree plantings, netball and soccer games, a church service, and a picnic lunch.

The village also has a Playcentre early childhood centre.
