= Ballance, New Zealand =

Locality in New Zealand

Ballance
- Locality
- Interactive map of Ballance
- Coordinates: 40.400°S 175.797°E
- Country: New Zealand
- Region: Manawatū-Whanganui
- Territorial authority: Tararua District
- Ward: South Tararua General Ward; Tamaki nui-a Rua Maori Ward
- Electorates: Wairarapa; Ikaroa-Rāwhiti (Māori)

Government
  - Territorial Authority: Tararua District Council
  - Regional council: Horizons Regional Council
  - Tararua Mayor: Scott Gilmore
  - Wairarapa MP: TBD
  - Ikaroa-Rāwhiti MP: Cushla Tangaere-Manuel

Area
  - Total: 78.24 km^{2} (30.21 sq mi)

Population (2023 census)
  - Total: 153
  - Density: 1.96/km^{2} (5.06/sq mi)

Ballance is a farming community in Tararua District and Manawatū-Whanganui region of New Zealand's North Island. The main settlement is located on the west back of the Mangahao River, south and west of Woodville and 11 km north-west of Pahiatua.

Tararua Wind Farm, the largest wind farm in the southern hemisphere, is located in the area.

The Ballance area includes part of the Manawatū Gorge west of Woodville, including the Ballance Bridge on State Highway 3. The Manawatu Gorge Track extends from Ballance in the east to the outskirts of Palmerston North in the west.

== History ==
=== European settlement ===
The settlement was founded in 1886 as one of several government-sponsored special settlements, established under a scheme of Land Minister John Ballance. It was named after Ballance, a Liberal Party politician who later went on to become Premier.

By 1890, the area was still covered in dense forest.

The Ballance Co-operative Dairy Company established a butter factory near the township which became central to the township's economy and identity. A hundred tons of prime butter was being produced by the factory each year. Factory manager Thomas Broome was born in Christchurch in 1864, and had learned butter and cheese making in Lincoln and Dunedin. A photograph, taken about 1895, shows two men standing outside the factory in front of suppliers with horses, wagons, milk cans and carts.

The Ballance Public School was established in 1890. By September 1896, it had a headmaster and teacher, a roll of 82, and an average attendance of 64. Headmaster Andrew Anderson had been born in Edinburgh, Scotland, educated in Geelong, Victoria, and had arrived in New Zealand in 1874.

By 1897, Ballance also had about a dozen houses, and a Weslayan Church and public hall built by volunteers. It connected to Pahiatua by a high-quality but narrow road, via the Mangatainoka Bridge, still incomplete Pahiatua railway station, a windy hilly stretch of road, Mangahao Valley, and Mangahao bridge.

It also had a store and post office run by Thomas Murphy, a native of County Kerry, Ireland who had arrived in New Zealand in 1866 and also farmed 114 acres with dairy cows.

=== Ballance Bridge ===
The original wooden Ballance Bridge was designed by James Fulton and opened by the Premier Richard Seddon and opened in 1904. It was closed in 1968 due to safety issues, and demolished on 23 February 1972.

A new iron-concrete Ballance Bridge was opened in 1971. Two bluffs had to be removed for the new bridge.

=== Recent history ===
In early 2004, a once-in-a-century flood took out fences, and covered dairy farms in silt.

An entry in Te Ara - the Encyclopedia of New Zealand, published in 2007, says Ballance has "failed to thrive" as John Ballance had originally intended.

In March 2009, Massey University student Catherine Peters died while jumping from the bridge when her rope came loose from her harness. The director of the company overseeing the jump was charged with manslaughter. He was found guilty in an emotionally-charged trial in June 2010.

== Demographics ==
Ballance locality covers 78.24 km^{2} (30.21 sq mi). It is part of the larger Nireaha-Eketāhuna statistical area.

Historical population
Year	Pop.	±% p.a.
2006	165	—
2013	168	+0.26%
2018	168	+0.00%
2023	153	−1.85%

Ballance had a population of 153 in the 2023 New Zealand census, a decrease of 15 people (−8.9%) since the 2018 census, and a decrease of 15 people (−8.9%) since the 2013 census. There were 90 males and 63 females in 72 dwellings. 3.9% of people identified as LGBTIQ+. The median age was 46.5 years (compared with 38.1 years nationally). There were 21 people (13.7%) aged under 15 years, 18 (11.8%) aged 15 to 29, 90 (58.8%) aged 30 to 64, and 24 (15.7%) aged 65 or older.

People could identify as more than one ethnicity. The results were 92.2% European (Pākehā), 13.7% Māori, 5.9% Asian, and 3.9% other, which includes people giving their ethnicity as "New Zealander". English was spoken by 96.1%, Māori by 2.0%, and other languages by 5.9%. No language could be spoken by 3.9% (e.g. too young to talk). The percentage of people born overseas was 7.8, compared with 28.8% nationally.

Religious affiliations were 39.2% Christian, 2.0% Islam, and 2.0% New Age. People who answered that they had no religion were 45.1%, and 13.7% of people did not answer the census question.

Of those at least 15 years old, 27 (20.5%) people had a bachelor's or higher degree, 69 (52.3%) had a post-high school certificate or diploma, and 39 (29.5%) people exclusively held high school qualifications. The median income was $35,700, compared with $41,500 nationally. 15 people (11.4%) earned over $100,000 compared to 12.1% nationally. The employment status of those at least 15 was 69 (52.3%) full-time, 24 (18.2%) part-time, and 3 (2.3%) unemployed.

== Education ==
Ballance School is a co-educational state primary school for Year 1 to 8 students, with a roll of 22 as of July 2026. It opened in late 1890.

The school is surrounded by farms and wind turbines.

In 2009, a Ministry of Education review proposed closing eight of the ten schools in the Tararua bush area, including Ballance School. The school had a roll of 25 at the time.

Principal Keryl Kelleher told the Dominion Post the proposal was a "bombshell":

""The school is the heart of this community, it's not just affecting the school kids. All the schools have to fight together."
