= Ross Intermediate School =

School in Palmerston North, New Zealand

- Te Kura Waenga o Ross

Location
- 25 Freyberg Street, 4414, Palmerston North, Manawatu, New Zealand; 40.3380°S 175.6255°E

Information
- Type: State co-educational intermediate (Years 7–8)
- Established: 1958
- Ministry of Education Institution no.: 2440
- Principal: Kara Mason
- Age: 11 to 13
- Enrolment: 440 (July 2026)
- Houses: Sheppard, Hillary, Cooper and Ngata
- Socio-economic decile: 6
- Website: www.rossint.school.nz

Ross Intermediate is a state co-educational intermediate school located in the Palmerston North, New Zealand suburb of Roslyn. It is the first school in New Zealand to have its own television station and laptop programme. The school television station has since been discontinued.

Opening in 1958, Ross Intermediate has a school roll of 440 students as of July 2026. Students are placed in a composite class on the first day of Year 7. Students usually stay with the same teacher for two years after attending the school. As of 2015, class sizes are no more than 24 students. However, the school tries to keep numbers at 23 students per class.

== History ==
Ross Intermediate School was officially opened by the Minister of Education and local MP Philip Skoglund, on 14 February 1958.

== School houses ==
In 2006, under the guidance of principal Wayne Jenkins, the school houses were established as a way of creating competition among the school. These are useful for organising competitive teams in sports and cultural events. On creation, the houses were Ngata, Hillary, Cooper and Batten. In 2014, a new house was added, named Cooper; this house contained the school's media classes. In 2015, Batten was removed, resulting in the current house system. The current house names, with the exception of Cooper, are the same house names used for Awatapu College, also in Palmerston North.

Houses
Hillary	Named after Sir Edmund Hillary.
Ngata	Named after Sir Āpirana Ngata.
Sheppard	Named after Kate Sheppard.
Cooper	Named after Dame Whina Cooper.
