= Rongotea =

New Zealand settlement

- Village
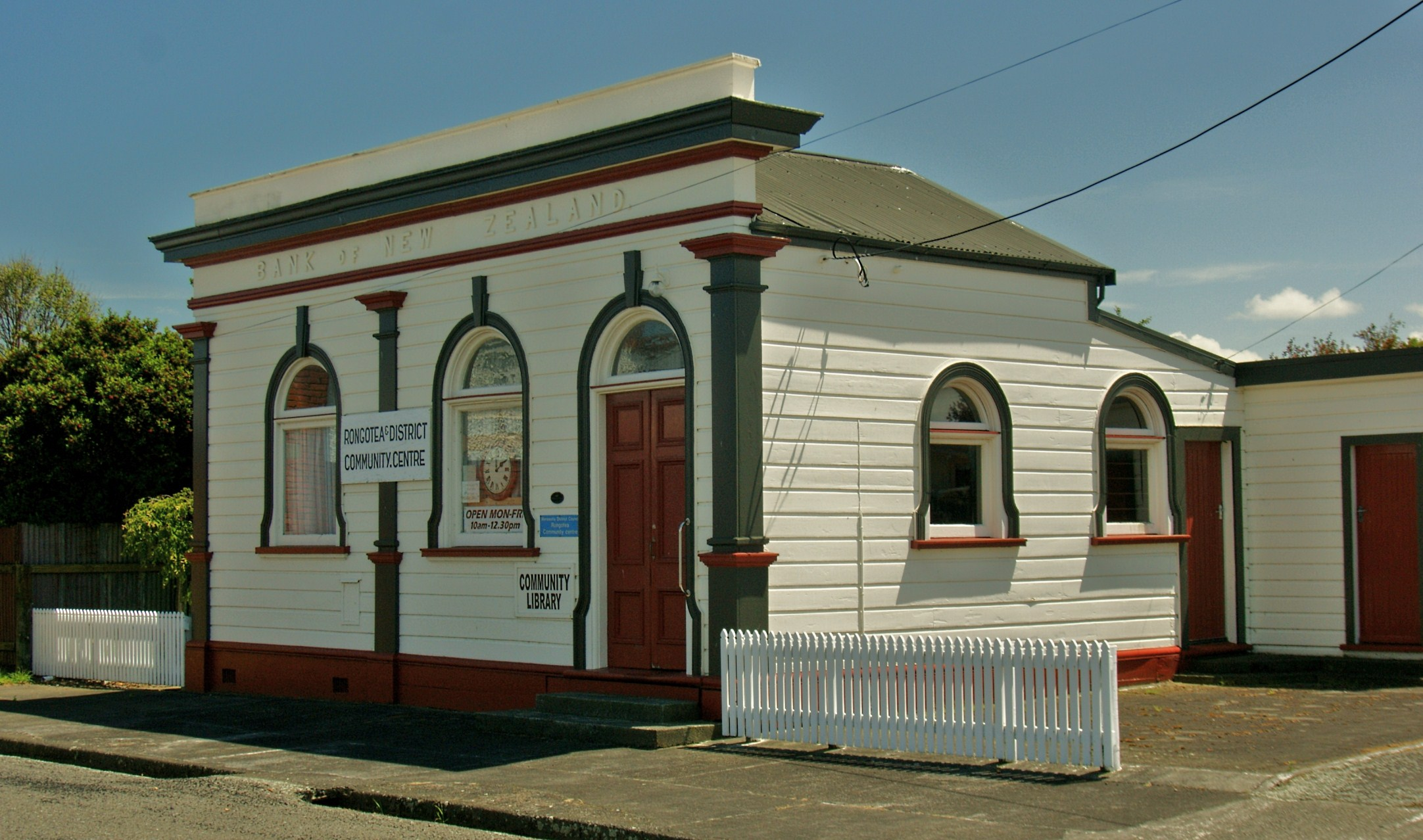
- Former Bank of New Zealand building, now a community centre and library
- Interactive map of Rongotea
- Coordinates: 40.293°S 175.425°E
- Country: New Zealand
- Region: Manawatū-Whanganui
- District: Manawatū District
- Ward: Manawatū Rural General Ward; Ngā Tapuae o Matangi Māori Ward
- Named for: "Peaceful place", or a local chief
- Electorates: Rangitīkei; Te Tai Hauāuru (Māori)

Government
  - Territorial Authority: Manawatū District Council
  - Regional council: Horizons Regional Council
  - Mayor of Manawatu: Michael Ford
  - Rangitīkei MP: Suze Redmayne
  - Te Tai Hauāuru MP: Debbie Ngarewa-Packer

Area
  - Total: 0.58 km^{2} (0.22 sq mi)

Population (June 2025)
  - Total: 690
  - Density: 1,200/km^{2} (3,100/sq mi)

Rongotea is a small rural village in the Manawatū District of the Manawatū-Whanganui region of New Zealand on the western Manawatū Plains, approximately 19 km (12 mi) northwest of the region's main city, Palmerston North.

== History ==
In the late 1860s, the Government put the Carnarvon Block up for sale, along with the neighbouring Sandon Block.

== Demographics ==
Rongotea is described by Stats NZ as a rural settlement. It covers 0.58 km^{2} (0.22 sq mi) and had an estimated population of 690 as of June 2025, with a population density of 1,190 people per km^{2}. It is part of the larger Awahuri statistical area.

Historical population for Rongotea
Year	Pop.	±% p.a.
2006	618	—
2013	627	+0.21%
2018	642	+0.47%
2023	690	+1.45%

Rongotea had a population of 690 in the 2023 New Zealand census, an increase of 48 people (7.5%) since the 2018 census, and an increase of 63 people (10.0%) since the 2013 census. There were 360 males and 330 females in 264 dwellings. 2.6% of people identified as LGBTIQ+. The median age was 37.7 years (compared with 38.1 years nationally). There were 147 people (21.3%) aged under 15 years, 114 (16.5%) aged 15 to 29, 303 (43.9%) aged 30 to 64, and 126 (18.3%) aged 65 or older.

People could identify as more than one ethnicity. The results were 90.0% European (Pākehā); 18.7% Māori; 2.6% Pasifika; 3.0% Asian; 1.3% Middle Eastern, Latin American and African New Zealanders (MELAA); and 3.5% other, which includes people giving their ethnicity as "New Zealander". English was spoken by 97.4%, Māori by 2.2%, Samoan by 0.9%, and other languages by 3.0%. No language could be spoken by 2.6% (e.g. too young to talk). New Zealand Sign Language was known by 0.4%. The percentage of people born overseas was 9.6, compared with 28.8% nationally.

Religious affiliations were 25.2% Christian, 0.4% Buddhist, 1.3% New Age, and 0.9% other religions. People who answered that they had no religion were 63.9%, and 7.8% of people did not answer the census question.

Of those at least 15 years old, 75 (13.8%) people had a bachelor's or higher degree, 306 (56.4%) had a post-high school certificate or diploma, and 162 (29.8%) people exclusively held high school qualifications. The median income was $41,800, compared with $41,500 nationally. 21 people (3.9%) earned over $100,000 compared to 12.1% nationally. The employment status of those at least 15 was 291 (53.6%) full-time, 78 (14.4%) part-time, and 9 (1.7%) unemployed.

=== Awahuri statistical area ===
Awahuri statistical area covers 124.44 km^{2} (48.05 sq mi) and had an estimated population of 2,190 as of June 2025, with a population density of 18 people per km^{2}.

Historical population for Awahuri
Year	Pop.	±% p.a.
2006	1,767	—
2013	1,764	−0.02%
2018	1,968	+2.21%
2023	2,115	+1.45%
The 2006 population is for a larger area of 126.36 km^{2}. Source:

Awahuri had a population of 2,115 in the 2023 New Zealand census, an increase of 147 people (7.5%) since the 2018 census, and an increase of 351 people (19.9%) since the 2013 census. There were 1,074 males, 1,032 females, and 9 people of other genders in 783 dwellings. 2.6% of people identified as LGBTIQ+. The median age was 40.9 years (compared with 38.1 years nationally). There were 447 people (21.1%) aged under 15 years, 315 (14.9%) aged 15 to 29, 957 (45.2%) aged 30 to 64, and 396 (18.7%) aged 65 or older.

People could identify as more than one ethnicity. The results were 91.3% European (Pākehā); 16.9% Māori; 1.6% Pasifika; 2.6% Asian; 0.6% Middle Eastern, Latin American and African New Zealanders (MELAA); and 2.8% other, which includes people giving their ethnicity as "New Zealander". English was spoken by 97.4%, Māori by 3.3%, Samoan by 0.4%, and other languages by 4.0%. No language could be spoken by 2.0% (e.g. too young to talk). New Zealand Sign Language was known by 0.7%. The percentage of people born overseas was 8.8, compared with 28.8% nationally.

Religious affiliations were 29.9% Christian, 0.4% Hindu, 0.7% Māori religious beliefs, 0.1% Buddhist, 0.7% New Age, and 0.9% other religions. People who answered that they had no religion were 58.3%, and 8.9% of people did not answer the census question.

Of those at least 15 years old, 291 (17.4%) people had a bachelor's or higher degree, 987 (59.2%) had a post-high school certificate or diploma, and 390 (23.4%) people exclusively held high school qualifications. The median income was $46,700, compared with $41,500 nationally. 174 people (10.4%) earned over $100,000 compared to 12.1% nationally. The employment status of those at least 15 was 909 (54.5%) full-time, 270 (16.2%) part-time, and 27 (1.6%) unemployed.

== Education ==
Rongotea School is a state primary school for Year 1 to 8 students, with a roll of 140. It opened in 1881 as Campbelltown School.

Kopane School, another state primary school, is located east of the main township. with a roll of 40. It opened in 1925.

Both schools are co-educational. Rolls are as of July 2026.
