= Tokirima =

Locality in Ruapehu District, Manawatū-Whanganui Region, New Zealand

Tokirimu
- Rural community
- Interactive map of Tokirimu
- Coordinates: 38.93920°S 175.01304°E
- Country: New Zealand
- Region: Manawatū-Whanganui
- District: Ruapehu District
- Ward: Ruapehu General Ward; Ruapehu Māori Ward
- Community: Taumarunui-Ōhura Community
- Electorates: Taranaki-King Country; Te Tai Hauāuru (Māori)

Government
  - Territorial Authority: Ruapehu District Council
  - Regional council: Horizons Regional Council
  - Mayor of Ruapehu: Weston Kirton
  - Taranaki-King Country MP: Barbara Kuriger
  - Te Tai Hauāuru MP: Debbie Ngarewa-Packer

Area
  - Total: 264.20 km^{2} (102.01 sq mi)

Population (2023 Census)
  - Total: 60
  - Density: 0.23/km^{2} (0.59/sq mi)

Tokirima is a valley and rural community, located west of Taumarunui and 19 kilometres (12 mi) south of Ōhura, in the Ruapehu District and Manawatū-Whanganui region of New Zealand's North Island. State Highway 43 and Stratford–Ōkahukura railway line pass through the valley, and Ōhura River passes nearby.

The name Tokirima translates as five (rima) adzes (Toki).

== History ==
European settlers visited the area as early as 1902, and the first permanent European settlement began about 1940. Children were taught in settler homes until Tokirima School opened in 1910.

Tokirima Post Office and Savings opened in 1909, but closed in 1988. It may have been the smallest post office and savings bank in the country. The 1937 post office building was registered as a Category Two Historic Building in 1997. It was damaged by a flood in 1998 and then restored. In March 2007, the post office reopened for one day for Tokirima's centenary celebration.

The Tokirima Memorial Hall was opened in 1924 and repainted in 2004. A roll of honour inside the hall commemorates the local men who served in the world wars: the nine men who died and 31 men who returned from World War I, and the two men who died 31 men who returned from World War II.

== Demographics ==
Tokirima locality covers 264.20 km^{2} (102.01 sq mi). The locality is part of the larger Otangiwai-Ohura statistical area.

Historical population
Year	Pop.	±% p.a.
2006	114	—
2013	87	−3.79%
2018	69	−4.53%
2023	60	−2.76%

Tokirima had a population of 60 in the 2023 New Zealand census, a decrease of 9 people (−13.0%) since the 2018 census, and a decrease of 27 people (−31.0%) since the 2013 census. There were 33 males and 27 females in 30 dwellings. The median age was 42.5 years (compared with 38.1 years nationally). There were 6 people (10.0%) aged under 15 years, 18 (30.0%) aged 15 to 29, 27 (45.0%) aged 30 to 64, and 9 (15.0%) aged 65 or older.

People could identify as more than one ethnicity. The results were 90.0% European (Pākehā), and 25.0% Māori. English was spoken by 100.0%, Māori by 5.0%, and other languages by 5.0%. No language could be spoken by 5.0% (e.g. too young to talk). No people were born overseas, compared with 28.8% nationally.

The sole religious affiliation given was 30.0% Christian. People who answered that they had no religion were 60.0%, and 5.0% of people did not answer the census question.

Of those at least 15 years old, 6 (11.1%) people had a bachelor's or higher degree, 39 (72.2%) had a post-high school certificate or diploma, and 9 (16.7%) people exclusively held high school qualifications. The median income was $32,700, compared with $41,500 nationally. The employment status of those at least 15 was 30 (55.6%) full-time, 12 (22.2%) part-time, and 3 (5.6%) unemployed.

== Education ==
Tokirima School is a co-educational state primary school, with a roll of 28 as of July 2026. It opened in 1907 or 1910. The school building was destroyed by floods in 1998 and rebuilt.

The school spent all of 2015 searching for a sole-charge principal. Following coverage in the Waikato Times and Seven Sharp, it received 71 applications from across New Zealand, Canada, South Africa and Australia. The successful applicant admitted she had never heard of Tokirima before seeing news about the job.

== Climate ==
Climate data for Tokirima (1981–2010)
Month	Jan	Feb	Mar	Apr	May	Jun	Jul	Aug	Sep	Oct	Nov	Dec	Year
Mean daily maximum °C (°F)	24.0 (75.2)	24.3 (75.7)	22.4 (72.3)	19.2 (66.6)	15.9 (60.6)	13.0 (55.4)	12.3 (54.1)	13.9 (57.0)	15.9 (60.6)	17.5 (63.5)	20.0 (68.0)	22.3 (72.1)	18.4 (65.1)
Daily mean °C (°F)	17.5 (63.5)	17.5 (63.5)	15.7 (60.3)	12.8 (55.0)	10.4 (50.7)	8.1 (46.6)	7.3 (45.1)	8.4 (47.1)	10.4 (50.7)	12.1 (53.8)	14.1 (57.4)	16.1 (61.0)	12.5 (54.6)
Mean daily minimum °C (°F)	10.9 (51.6)	10.8 (51.4)	9.0 (48.2)	6.4 (43.5)	4.8 (40.6)	3.1 (37.6)	2.4 (36.3)	2.8 (37.0)	4.9 (40.8)	6.8 (44.2)	8.2 (46.8)	10.0 (50.0)	6.7 (44.0)
Source: NIWA
