= Orautoha =

- Rural community
- Interactive map of Orautoha
- Country: New Zealand
- Region: Manawatū-Whanganui
- District: Ruapehu District
- Ward: Ruapehu General Ward; Ruapehu Māori Ward
- Community: Waimarino-Waiouru Community
- Electorates: Whanganui; Te Tai Hauāuru (Māori)

Government
  - Territorial Authority: Ruapehu District Council
  - Regional council: Horizons Regional Council
  - Mayor of Ruapehu: Weston Kirton
  - Whanganui MP: Carl Bates
  - Te Tai Hauāuru MP: Debbie Ngarewa-Packer

Area
  - Total: 67.60 km^{2} (26.10 sq mi)

Population (2023 Census)
  - Total: 126
  - Density: 1.86/km^{2} (4.83/sq mi)
- Postcode(s): 4691

Orautoha is a valley and rural community in the Ruapehu District and Manawatū-Whanganui region of New Zealand's North Island.

Bill McNie was the original settler of the valley. McNie built a house in the valley in 1924, using newspaper as wallpaper. It later became workers' accommodation and then shearers' housing after his death in 1961, before being renovated into a rural bach his grand-nephew. The bach, on an active beef and sheep farm, was voted one of the best in the country in 2017.

The area currently consists of several farms on rugged land, with residents having to face regular electrical outages.

== Demographics ==
Orautoha locality covers 67.60 km^{2} (26.10 sq mi). It is part of the larger Tangiwai statistical area.

Historical population
Year	Pop.	±% p.a.
2006	162	—
2013	129	−3.20%
2018	132	+0.46%
2023	126	−0.93%

Orautoha had a population of 126 in the 2023 New Zealand census, a decrease of 6 people (−4.5%) since the 2018 census, and a decrease of 3 people (−2.3%) since the 2013 census. There were 75 males and 54 females in 54 dwellings. The median age was 50.9 years (compared with 38.1 years nationally). There were 21 people (16.7%) aged under 15 years, 9 (7.1%) aged 15 to 29, 60 (47.6%) aged 30 to 64, and 36 (28.6%) aged 65 or older.

People could identify as more than one ethnicity. The results were 83.3% European (Pākehā), 26.2% Māori, 7.1% Pasifika, 2.4% Asian, and 4.8% other, which includes people giving their ethnicity as "New Zealander". English was spoken by 95.2%, Māori by 4.8%, and other languages by 2.4%. No language could be spoken by 4.8% (e.g. too young to talk). The percentage of people born overseas was 7.1, compared with 28.8% nationally.

Religious affiliations were 28.6% Christian, 2.4% Hindu, and 4.8% Māori religious beliefs. People who answered that they had no religion were 57.1%, and 7.1% of people did not answer the census question.

Of those at least 15 years old, 15 (14.3%) people had a bachelor's or higher degree, 60 (57.1%) had a post-high school certificate or diploma, and 30 (28.6%) people exclusively held high school qualifications. The median income was $44,400, compared with $41,500 nationally. 18 people (17.1%) earned over $100,000 compared to 12.1% nationally. The employment status of those at least 15 was 57 (54.3%) full-time, 24 (22.9%) part-time, and 3 (2.9%) unemployed.

== Education ==
Orautoha School is a co-educational state primary school for Year 1 to 8 students, with a roll of 48 as of July 2026. It opened in 1908.

In 2019, students from the school helped plant a new walkway along Makotuku River.
