= St Dominic's College, Whanganui =

Coordinates: 39.93946°S 175.02263°E

St. Dominic's College

Location
- 12B York Street, Gonville, Whanganui; New Zealand

Information
- Type: Private secondary school
- Motto: Latin: Confortare et esto Vir
- Established: 1994; 32 years ago
- Ministry of Education Institution no.: 454
- Principal: Rosemarie Fahey
- Years: 9–13
- Enrolment: 51 (July 2026)
- Website: sspx.nz/en/st-dominics-college-33385

St. Dominic's College is a private, secondary school run by the Society of St. Pius X located in Gonville, within the Parish of St. Anthony's & St. Edmund's Catholic Church in Whanganui, New Zealand. The school was founded in 1994 by the Society of Saint Pius X. It is divided into two campuses, namely St Augustine's Boys' College and St Dominic's Girls. The school further shares ground with St Anthony's School, which caters to years 1-6.

== Overview ==
Students at St Dominic's College are examined under the CIE (Cambridge International Examinations) system. The main subjects offered at the school include Mathematics, English, History, Combined Science, Physics, Biology, French, Latin, and Classics. Additionally, the school provides other subjects such as music, home economics, physical education, computer studies, and more to broaden the educational scope.

Catholic Religion classes are given significant emphasis, covering topics such as Catholic Doctrine and Morality, Catholic Church History, Catholic Apologetics, and Scripture.

The Dominican Sisters of Wanganui assist in teaching at the school.

== Boarding hostel ==
Singadou Hostel, owned by a trust board, accommodates up to 13 St Dominic's girls students in separate rooms. Boarders attend daily Mass at St Anthony's church adjacent to the hostel and are also involved in wider parish life.
