= Faith City School =

Location
- 127 Springvale Road, Springvale, Wanganui, New Zealand; 39.9206°S 175.0206°E

Information
- Type: State co-ed primary
- Established: 1979
- Ministry of Education Institution no.: 422
- Principal: Martin Bullock
- Enrolment: 157 (July 2026)
- Socio-economic decile: 4
- Website: {{URL|example.com|optional display text}}faithcity.school.nz]

Faith City School, formerly Faith Academy, is a state-integrated primary school in New Zealand. With a roll of around 150 students, Faith City School is the largest inter-denominational school in the Whanganui area. Teaching the New Zealand state curriculum from a Christian perspective, the school caters for pupils from New Entrants (Year 0) to Year 8. The school was established and is still owned by Faith City Church (formerly Faith Community Church), a local Assemblies of God in New Zealand church.

== History ==
In 1978, Faith City Church purchased land in Wanganui, New Zealand, for the purpose of establishing a Christian education based school. In 1979 the church opened Faith Academy with a roll of 25 students using the Accelerated Christian Education curriculum, although this was later abandoned. In 1980 the school was officially registered with the New Zealand Ministry of Education. In 1995 Faith Academy became an integrated State School maintaining its Christian character and teaching emphasis.

In 2013, the school underwent a name change and rebranding from Faith Academy to Faith City School. This was partially due to the dated term 'Academy' as well as bringing the name in line with the proprietors Faith City Church.
