= Whanganui East =

Suburb of Whanganui

- Suburb
- Interactive map of Whanganui East
- Coordinates: 39.917154°S 175.063240°E
- Country: New Zealand
- City: Whanganui
- Local authority: Whanganui District Council

Area
  - Land: 441 ha (1,090 acres)

Population (June 2025)
  - Total: 6,370
  - Density: 1,440/km^{2} (3,740/sq mi)

	Aramoho	Upokongaro
	Whanganui East
Whanganui Central	Bastia Hill

Whanganui East is a suburb of Whanganui, in the Whanganui District and Manawatū-Whanganui region of New Zealand's North Island.

== Demographics ==
Whanganui East covers 4.41 km^{2} (1.70 sq mi) and had an estimated population of 6,370 as of June 2025, with a population density of 1,444 people per km^{2}.

Historical population
Year	Pop.	±% p.a.
2006	6,063	—
2013	5,820	−0.58%
2018	6,159	+1.14%
2023	6,273	+0.37%

Whanganui East had a population of 6,273 in the 2023 New Zealand census, an increase of 114 people (1.9%) since the 2018 census, and an increase of 453 people (7.8%) since the 2013 census. There were 2,907 males, 3,336 females, and 33 people of other genders in 2,610 dwellings. 3.2% of people identified as LGBTIQ+. The median age was 42.0 years (compared with 38.1 years nationally). There were 1,215 people (19.4%) aged under 15 years, 1,050 (16.7%) aged 15 to 29, 2,571 (41.0%) aged 30 to 64, and 1,437 (22.9%) aged 65 or older.

People could identify as more than one ethnicity. The results were 78.0% European (Pākehā); 32.5% Māori; 3.8% Pasifika; 3.3% Asian; 0.3% Middle Eastern, Latin American and African New Zealanders (MELAA); and 2.4% other, which includes people giving their ethnicity as "New Zealander". English was spoken by 97.7%, Māori by 9.0%, Samoan by 0.6%, and other languages by 4.4%. No language could be spoken by 1.5% (e.g. too young to talk). New Zealand Sign Language was known by 0.9%. The percentage of people born overseas was 10.9, compared with 28.8% nationally.

Religious affiliations were 30.1% Christian, 0.5% Hindu, 0.1% Islam, 3.8% Māori religious beliefs, 0.3% Buddhist, 0.8% New Age, and 1.1% other religions. People who answered that they had no religion were 55.8%, and 7.8% of people did not answer the census question.

Of those at least 15 years old, 684 (13.5%) people had a bachelor's or higher degree, 2,952 (58.4%) had a post-high school certificate or diploma, and 1,428 (28.2%) people exclusively held high school qualifications. The median income was $30,300, compared with $41,500 nationally. 168 people (3.3%) earned over $100,000 compared to 12.1% nationally. The employment status of those at least 15 was 2,058 (40.7%) full-time, 651 (12.9%) part-time, and 222 (4.4%) unemployed.

Individual statistical areas
Name	Area (km^{2})	Population	Density (per km^{2})	Dwellings	Median age	Median income
Wembley Park	1.54	1,797	1,167	681	35.7 years	$30,300
Whanganui East-Williams Domain	1.58	2,271	1,646	978	46.4 years	$29,300
Whanganui East-Riverlands	1.50	2,208	1,472	951	42.3 years	$32,200
New Zealand					38.1 years	$41,500

== Education ==
Whanganui East School is a co-educational state primary school for Year 1 to 6 students, with a roll of 160 as of October 2025. It opened in 1904.

St Anne's School is a co-educational state integrated Catholic primary school for Year 1 to 8 students, with a roll of 218. It opened in 1942 at the corner of Kawakawa and Nixon streets, and moved to Raine Street in 1976.

Whanganui Girls' College is a single-sex state secondary school, with a roll of 344. It opened in 1891.
