= Castlecliff =

Suburb of Whanganui, New Zealand

- Suburb
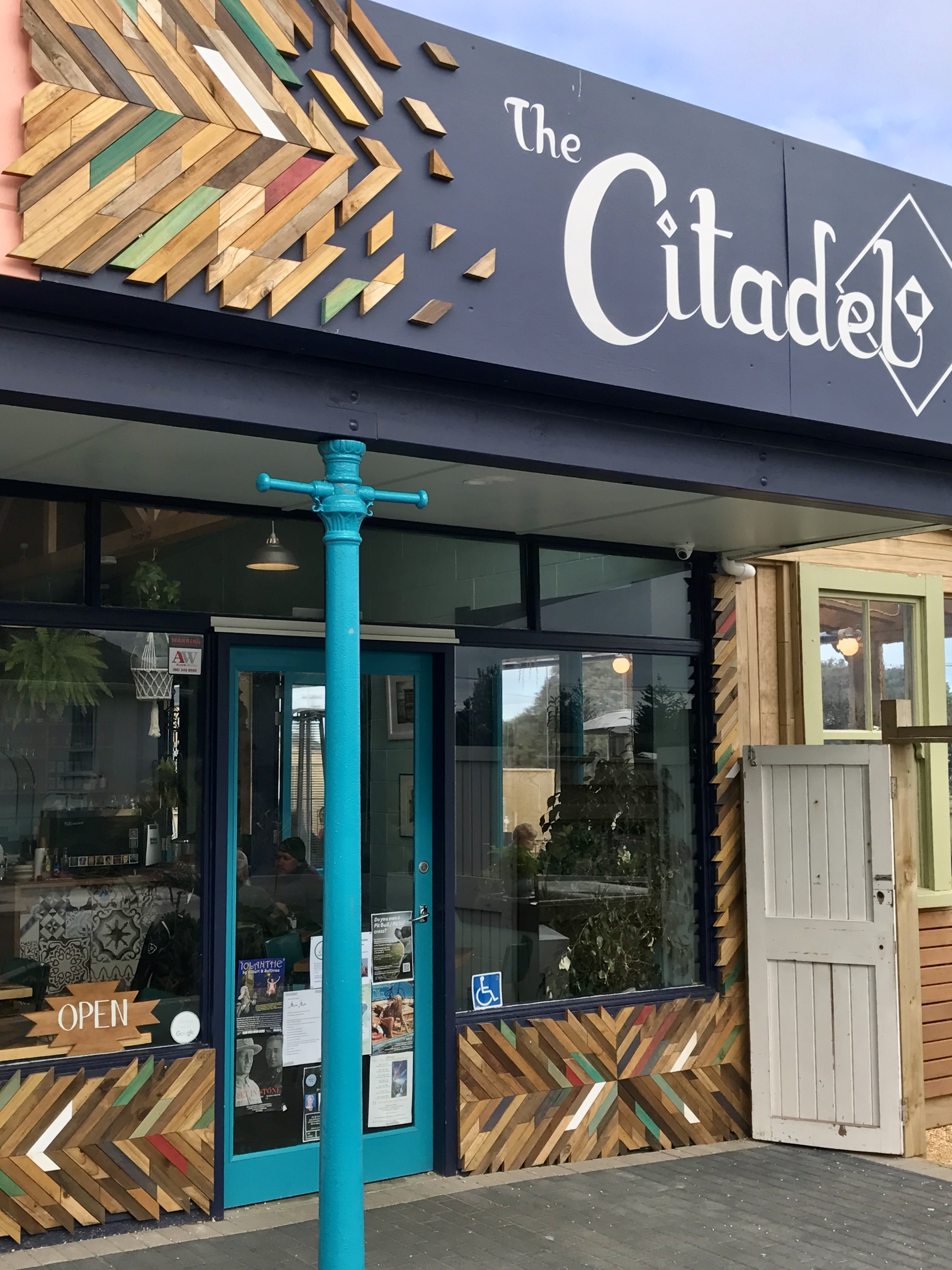
- A café in Castlecliff
- Interactive map of Castlecliff
- Coordinates: 39.943031°S 174.993740°E
- Country: New Zealand
- City: Whanganui
- Local authority: Whanganui District Council

Area
  - Land: 865 ha (2,140 acres)

Population (June 2025)
  - Total: 4,260
  - Density: 492/km^{2} (1,280/sq mi)

Kai Iwi	Westmere	Tawhero
	Castlecliff	Gonville
(South Taranaki Bight)	(Whanganui River mouth)

Castlecliff is a suburb of Whanganui, in the Whanganui District and Manawatū-Whanganui region of New Zealand's North Island. The name was given by the Harbour Board, on the suggestion of the future Prime Minister, John Ballance, when it established the township on what were described as "barren sandhills" in 1882. Many of the streets were named after Harbour Board members. The northern harbour breakwater extended 900 ft (270 m) by 1885. The freezing works was built in 1891.

== Demographics ==
Castlecliff covers 8.65 km^{2} (3.34 sq mi) and had an estimated population of 4,260 as of June 2025, with a population density of 492 people per km^{2}.

Historical population
Year	Pop.	±% p.a.
2006	3,420	—
2013	3,264	−0.66%
2018	3,714	+2.62%
2023	4,026	+1.63%

Castlecliff had a population of 4,026 in the 2023 New Zealand census, an increase of 312 people (8.4%) since the 2018 census, and an increase of 762 people (23.3%) since the 2013 census. There were 2,094 males, 1,920 females, and 12 people of other genders in 1,479 dwellings. 3.7% of people identified as LGBTIQ+. There were 858 people (21.3%) aged under 15 years, 792 (19.7%) aged 15 to 29, 1,719 (42.7%) aged 30 to 64, and 657 (16.3%) aged 65 or older.

People could identify as more than one ethnicity. The results were 70.6% European (Pākehā); 43.0% Māori; 6.3% Pasifika; 3.4% Asian; 0.4% Middle Eastern, Latin American and African New Zealanders (MELAA); and 2.5% other, which includes people giving their ethnicity as "New Zealander". English was spoken by 96.3%, Māori by 12.5%, Samoan by 0.8%, and other languages by 5.1%. No language could be spoken by 2.5% (e.g. too young to talk). New Zealand Sign Language was known by 1.1%. The percentage of people born overseas was 10.5, compared with 28.8% nationally.

Religious affiliations were 23.9% Christian, 0.6% Hindu, 0.1% Islam, 6.3% Māori religious beliefs, 0.7% Buddhist, 0.9% New Age, and 1.3% other religions. People who answered that they had no religion were 58.0%, and 8.9% of people did not answer the census question.

Of those at least 15 years old, 387 (12.2%) people had a bachelor's or higher degree, 1,845 (58.2%) had a post-high school certificate or diploma, and 942 (29.7%) people exclusively held high school qualifications. 111 people (3.5%) earned over $100,000 compared to 12.1% nationally. The employment status of those at least 15 was 1,350 (42.6%) full-time, 423 (13.4%) part-time, and 162 (5.1%) unemployed.

Individual statistical areas
Name	Area (km^{2})	Population	Density (per km^{2})	Dwellings	Median age	Median income
Castlecliff West	3.02	1,776	587	699	40.3 years	$30,800
Castlecliff East	2.81	2,109	751	729	34.4 years	$33,300
Balgownie	2.82	141	50	51	35.4 years	$27,900
New Zealand					38.1 years	$41,500

== Education ==
Castlecliff School is a state primary school for Year 1 to 6 students, with a roll of 165. It opened in 1892.

Aranui School is another state primary school for Year 1 to 6 students, with a roll of 67. It opened in 1965.

Te Kura o Kokohuia is a Year 1 to 8 state primary school, with a roll of 206. It was the first bilingual school in Whanganui. It was in existence in 1991.

Te Kura Kaupapa Māori o Tupoho is a Māori language immersion primary school for Year 1 to 8 students, with a roll of 149. It started in 1996 as a satellite school of Te Kura o Kokohuia.

All these schools are co-educational. Rolls are as of July 2025.

== See also ==
Castlecliff Branch railway opened 1885

Castlecliff tramway opened 1912
