= Glen Oroua =

Rural community in Manawatū-Whanganui Region, New Zealand

- Village
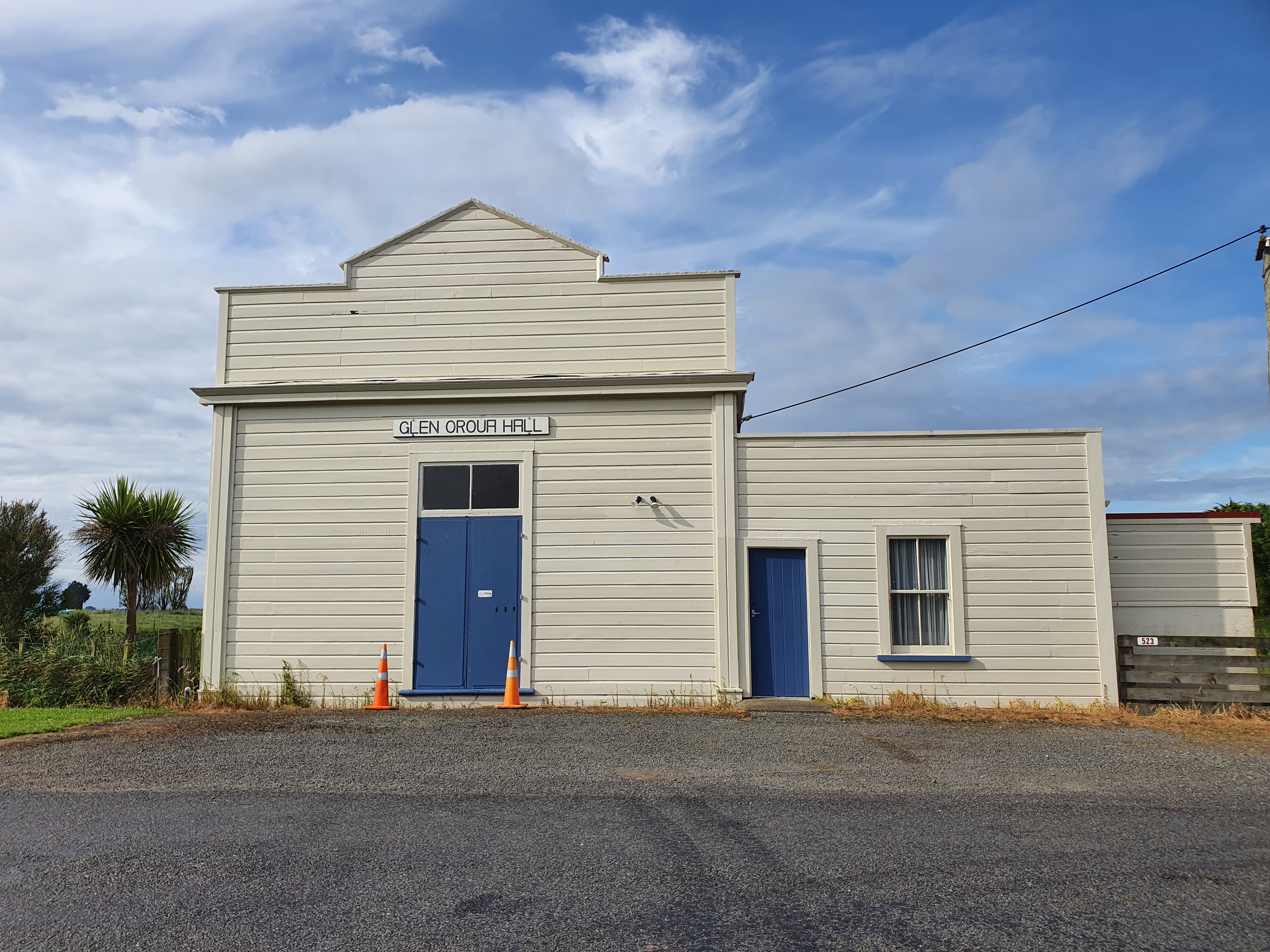
- The village hall in Glen Oroua
- Interactive map of Glen Oroua
- Coordinates: 40.332277°S 175.411484°E
- Country: New Zealand
- Region: Manawatū-Whanganui
- District: Manawatū District
- Ward: Manawatū Rural General Ward; Ngā Tapuae o Matangi Māori Ward
- Electorates: Rangitīkei; Te Tai Hauāuru (Māori)

Government
  - Territorial Authority: Manawatū District Council
  - Regional council: Horizons Regional Council
  - Mayor of Manawatu: Michael Ford
  - Rangitīkei MP: Suze Redmayne
  - Te Tai Hauāuru MP: Debbie Ngarewa-Packer

Area
  - Total: 26.83 km^{2} (10.36 sq mi)

Population (2023 Census)
  - Total: 216
  - Density: 8.05/km^{2} (20.9/sq mi)

Glen Oroua is a community in the Manawatū District and Manawatū-Whanganui region in New Zealand's central North Island.

== Demographics ==
Glen Oroua locality covers 26.83 km^{2} (10.36 sq mi). It is part of the larger Taikorea statistical area.

Historical population for Glen Oroua locality
Year	Pop.	±% p.a.
2006	210	—
2013	222	+0.80%
2018	237	+1.32%
2023	216	−1.84%

Glen Oroua had a population of 216 in the 2023 New Zealand census, a decrease of 21 people (−8.9%) since the 2018 census, and a decrease of 6 people (−2.7%) since the 2013 census. There were 105 males and 114 females in 69 dwellings. There were 48 people (22.2%) aged under 15 years, 27 (12.5%) aged 15 to 29, 99 (45.8%) aged 30 to 64, and 33 (15.3%) aged 65 or older.

People could identify as more than one ethnicity. The results were 91.7% European (Pākehā), 8.3% Māori, and 5.6% other, which includes people giving their ethnicity as "New Zealander". English was spoken by 97.2%, Māori by 1.4%, and other languages by 2.8%. No language could be spoken by 2.8% (e.g. too young to talk). New Zealand Sign Language was known by 1.4%. The percentage of people born overseas was 5.6, compared with 28.8% nationally.

Religious affiliations were 37.5% Christian, and 1.4% other religions. People who answered that they had no religion were 52.8%, and 8.3% of people did not answer the census question.

Of those at least 15 years old, 36 (21.4%) people had a bachelor's or higher degree, 93 (55.4%) had a post-high school certificate or diploma, and 42 (25.0%) people exclusively held high school qualifications. 18 people (10.7%) earned over $100,000 compared to 12.1% nationally. The employment status of those at least 15 was 90 (53.6%) full-time and 33 (19.6%) part-time.

=== Taikorea statistical area ===
Taikorea statistical area covers 152.98 km^{2} (59.07 sq mi) and had an estimated population of 1,450 as of June 2025, with a population density of 9.5 people per km^{2}.

Historical population for Taikorea statistical area
Year	Pop.	±% p.a.
2006	1,161	—
2013	1,194	+0.40%
2018	1,284	+1.46%
2023	1,368	+1.28%

Taikorea had a population of 1,368 in the 2023 New Zealand census, an increase of 84 people (6.5%) since the 2018 census, and an increase of 174 people (14.6%) since the 2013 census. There were 684 males, 681 females, and 3 people of other genders in 477 dwellings. 1.5% of people identified as LGBTIQ+. The median age was 39.1 years (compared with 38.1 years nationally). There were 309 people (22.6%) aged under 15 years, 222 (16.2%) aged 15 to 29, 633 (46.3%) aged 30 to 64, and 204 (14.9%) aged 65 or older.

People could identify as more than one ethnicity. The results were 91.2% European (Pākehā); 16.4% Māori; 1.8% Pasifika; 1.3% Asian; 0.2% Middle Eastern, Latin American and African New Zealanders (MELAA); and 5.3% other, which includes people giving their ethnicity as "New Zealander". English was spoken by 98.2%, Māori by 1.3%, and other languages by 3.3%. No language could be spoken by 1.5% (e.g. too young to talk). New Zealand Sign Language was known by 0.2%. The percentage of people born overseas was 8.8, compared with 28.8% nationally.

Religious affiliations were 31.8% Christian, 0.4% Hindu, 0.4% Māori religious beliefs, 0.2% Buddhist, 0.2% New Age, and 1.3% other religions. People who answered that they had no religion were 57.5%, and 8.6% of people did not answer the census question.

Of those at least 15 years old, 174 (16.4%) people had a bachelor's or higher degree, 636 (60.1%) had a post-high school certificate or diploma, and 249 (23.5%) people exclusively held high school qualifications. The median income was $44,000, compared with $41,500 nationally. 102 people (9.6%) earned over $100,000 compared to 12.1% nationally. The employment status of those at least 15 was 582 (55.0%) full-time, 198 (18.7%) part-time, and 21 (2.0%) unemployed.

== Education ==
Glen Oroua School is a co-educational state primary school for Year 1 to 8 students, with a roll of 68 as of July 2026. It opened in 1903.
