= Whanganui City College =

Location
- 84 Ingestre Street, Whanganui, Manawatū-Whanganui, New Zealand; 39.9316°S 175.0458°E

Information
- Funding type: State
- Motto: Superanda Omnia Ferendo (By work, all things can be overcome)
- Established: 1911
- Ministry of Education Institution no.: 187
- Principal: Peter Kaua
- Years offered: 9–13
- Gender: Coeducational Secondary School
- Enrolment: 290 (July 2026)
- Socio-economic decile: 2E
- Website: www.wcc.school.nz

Whanganui City College is located in Ingestre Street, Whanganui. It became Wanganui City College in 1994. It was formerly the Wanganui Technical College established in 1911 and it became Wanganui Boys' College in 1964.

== Enrolment ==
As of July 2026, Whanganui City College has a roll of 290 students, of which 220 (75.9%) identify as Māori.

As of 2026, the school has an Equity Index of 547, placing it amongst schools whose students have the most socioeconomic barriers to achievement (roughly equivalent to deciles 1 and 2 under the former socio-economic decile system).

== Notable alumni ==
- Peter Belliss (1965–68), World and Commonwealth bowls champion
- Ruka Broughton, tohunga, Anglican priest, and university lecturer
- Sir Paul Callaghan (1947–2012), professor, physicist, and 2011 New Zealander of the Year
- Air Commodore Al Deere, OBE, DSO, DFC & Bar, Battle of Britain pilot and author
- Arnold Downer (1895–1984), civil engineer, construction contractor and company director
- Andy Haden (1965–1968), All Black
- Michael Laws (1970–74, Hostel), Mayor of Whanganui 2004–10, National MP 1990–96, broadcaster, writer
- Mark Burton (1969–73), Labour MP & Cabinet Minister 1993–2008
- Waisake Naholo, All Black
- Paul Perez, Samoan Rugby International
- Akapusi Qera, Fijian Rugby International
- Graham Sims (1964–67, Hostel), All Black
- Rana Waitai, NZ First MP 1990–93
- Noel Scott, Labour MP Tongaririo 1984–90, founding principal Makoura College
- James Allen Ward, RNZAF pilot, recipient of VC
- Dick Tonks, New Zealand national rowing coach and Olympic medallist
- Chris Masoe, All Black

== Early years ==
=== Wanganui Technical College ===
The school was established in 1911, an amalgamation of the Wanganui Technical School of Design (est. 1892) and Victoria Avenue District High School.

=== Wanganui Boys' College ===
Wanganui Technical College became Wanganui Boys' College from 1964.
