= Whanganui District Council =

Territorial authority of New Zealand

Whanganui District Council Te Kaunihera a Rohe o Whanganui

Type
- Type: District council of Whanganui
- Term limits: None

History
- Founded: 1989
- Preceded by: Wanganui City; Wanganui County

Leadership
- Mayor: Andrew Tripe
- Chief executive: David Langford

Structure
- Seats: 13 (Note: One mayor, 12 councillors)
- Length of term: 3 years

Elections
- Voting system: FPP
- Last election: 11 October 2025
- Next election: 2028

Motto
- Sans Dieu Rien (Without God Nothing)

Meeting place
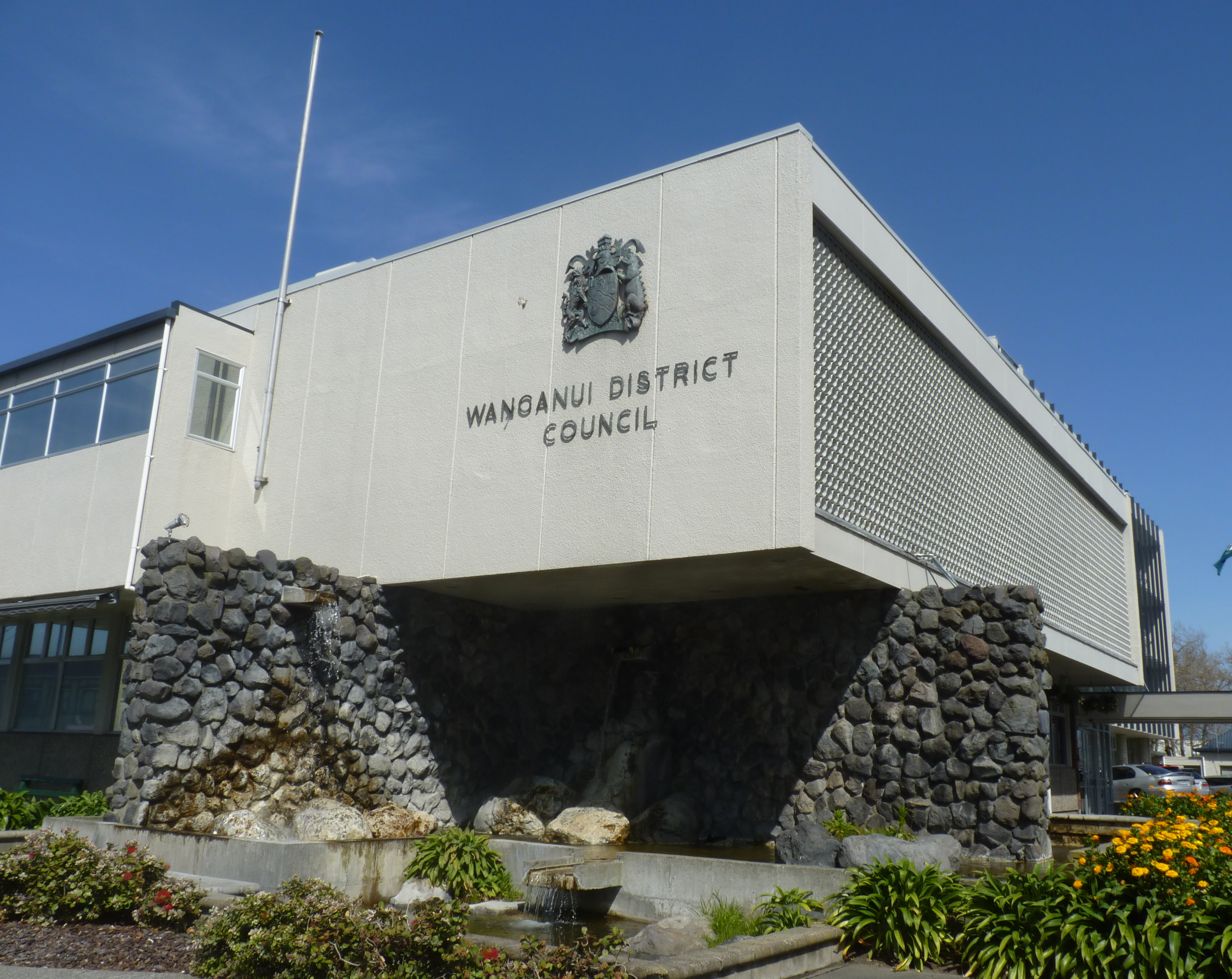
- 101 Guyton Street, Whanganui

Website
- www.whanganui.govt.nz/Home

The Whanganui District Council, formerly spelled Wanganui District Council, is the territorial authority for Whanganui District, New Zealand, comprising the city of Whanganui and its surrounding areas.

The council is made up of a mayor and 12 councillors, all elected at-large. They are elected using a first-past-the-post system in triennial elections, with the most recent elections having been held in 2022.

The current mayor is Andrew Tripe.

== History ==
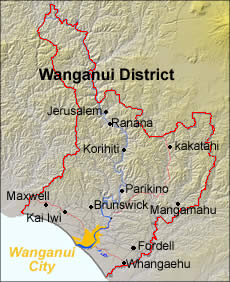
Map of Whanganui District

Local government in Whanganui began with the creation of the Wanganui Town Board, within Wellington Province, in 1862. Following the abolishment of the Wellington Province, Wanganui County was founded in 1876.

The town board was elevated to a borough council in 1872, and then to a city council in 1924 following amalgamation with the town boards of Wanganui East, Gonville and Castlecliff.

Wanganui District Council formed after the 1989 local government reforms with the amalgamation of the Wanganui City Council with the Wanganui County Council.

In 2015, the spelling of the district was changed from Wanganui District to Whanganui District following a request from the council.

In October 2023 the council voted to establish a Māori ward for the 2025 and 2028 local elections.

== Composition ==
=== Councillors ===
The elected mayor and councillors provide governance for the city by setting the policy direction of the council, monitoring its performance, representing the city's interests, and employing the Chief Executive.

The Chief Executive runs the everyday business of the council. The Chief Executive is currently David Langford.

Whanganui District Council, 2025–2028
Position	Name	Ticket (if any)
Mayor	Andrew Tripe	Let's keep Whanganui moving forward
Deputy Mayor	Michael Law	Independent
Councillor	Philippa Baker-Hogan	Ratepayer & Sport Focused
Councillor	Glenda Brown	Independent
Councillor	Josh Chandulal-Mackay	A New Generation of Leadership
Councillor	Ross Fallen	Independent
Councillor	Mike Hos	A voice for our city's future
Councillor	Kate Joblin	Independent
Councillor	Michael Law	Independent
Councillor	Charlotte Melser	Independent
Councillor	Peter Oskam	Community before Coin
Councillor	Rob Vinsen	Ratepayer Focused
Māori Ward	Julie Herewini	Independent
Māori Ward	Geoff Hipango	Independent

=== Community board ===
The council has created a local community board, under the provisions of Part 4 of the Local Government Act 2002, to represent the district's rural community. The Whanganui Rural Community Board consists of seven elected members.

The community board is intended to represent and advocate for the interests of the rural community.

Whanganui Rural Community Board, 2022–2025
Name	Subdivision	Position
David Wells	Whanganui	Board chair
Judd Bailey	Kaitoke	Deputy chair
Jenny Tamakehu	Whanganui	Member
Michael Dick	Kai Iwi	Member
Grant Skilton	Kai Iwi	Member
Brian Doughty	Kai Iwi	Member
Bill Ashworth	Kaitoke	Member

== Civic symbols ==
=== Logo ===
The Whanganui district council logo was revealed to the public on 28 January 2026 at a cost of $116,899. Research conducted in early 2025 found about 60% of local residents could not recall the council crest and many did not understand what services and responsibilities the council provides. The main reasoning for the rebrand is the goal consolidating the 20 separate brand identities and costing savings by using a simple single colour logo.

=== Coat of arms ===
Wanganui City Council was granted a Coat of Arms in 1955. The Whanganui District Council has adopted the use of these arms as memorial bearings. The blazon for the arms is:

Coat of arms of Whanganui
Crest On a Wreath of the Colours On a Mount Vert a representation of the Rutland Blockhouse proper. Escutcheon Gules on a Bend wavy Argent cotised wavy Or between two Escallops of the second three Lymphads each fesswise that in the centre Sable the others of the first all with sails furled and pennons flying on a Chief also of the second a Ram's head caboshed proper between two open Books proper bound Gules edged Gold. Supporters On the dexter side a Lion guardant Azure charged on the shoulder with four Mullets one two and one Gules fimbriated Argent and on the sinister side a Tuatara Lizard upon a Rock proper. Motto Sans Dieu Rien ("Without God Nothing") Symbolism The shells are taken from the arms of William Petre, 11th Baron Petre, the lymphads are taken from the arms of William Hogg Watt, while the bend is intended to represent the Whanganui River.

=== Flag ===
The flag of Whanganui

The current flag of the Whanganui District Council was adopted in 2015 for use during formal occasions and to be display in the council chamber and outside the council offices. The flag consists of the coat of arms with the Māori and English names of the council beneath it in white, all on a blue field.

== See also ==
- Territorial authorities bordering Whanganui District Council:
  - South Taranaki District Council
  - Stratford District Council
  - Ruapehu District Council
  - Rangitikei District Council
- Horizons Regional Council – the regional council covering Whanganui District
