= Ayers =

Ayers may refer to:

== People ==
- A.D. Ayers, American baseball umpire (National League)
- Aaron Ayers (1836–1900), New Zealand auctioneer and politician
- Bill Ayers (born 1944), American academic and activist
- Bill Ayers (baseball) (1919–1980), American Major League Baseball pitcher
- Bruce Ayers (born 1962), American small business owner and politician
- Cameron Ayers (born 1991), American basketball player
- Charlie Ayers (born 1966), former executive chef for Google
- David Ayers (1841–1916), Union Army soldier during the American Civil War
- Demarcus Ayers (born 1994), American football player
- Dick Ayers (1924–2014), American comic book artist
- Duffy Ayers (1915–2017), English portrait painter
- Edward L. Ayers (born 1953), American historian, president of the University of Richmond
- Eli Ayers (1778–1822), first colonial agent of the American Colonization Society
- Fred Ayers (1912–1986), Australian rules footballer
- Frederick Ayers, English engineer
- Greg Ayers, Australian atmospheric scientist
- Haskel Ayers (1936–2020), American auctioneer and politician
- Henry Ayers (1821–1897), former Premier of South Australia
- Howard "Doc" Ayers (1922–2020), American football coach
- James F. Ayers (1847–1895), American soldier
- Janeé Ayers (born 1981), American politician
- Jason Ayers (born 1982), American professional wrestling referee
- Jeremy Ayers (1948–2016), American artist, writer, musician, and photographer
- John Ayers (1953–1995), National Football League offensive lineman
- John G. K. Ayers (1837–1913), Union Army soldier during the American Civil War
- John L. Ayers (1902–1985), American politician
- John W. Ayers, American behavioral epidemiologist
- Kevin Ayers (1944–2013), British rock singer
- Maurice L. Ayers (1819–1884), American banker, farmer, hotelier, politician
- Michael Ayers (boxer) (born 1965), British boxer
- Michael R. Ayers (born 1935), British philosopher
- Mike Ayers (born 1948), American football coach
- Nabil Ayers, American entrepreneur and musician
- Nathaniel Ayers (born 1951), American musician
- Nick Ayers (born 1982), American political strategist
- Nigel Ayers (born 1957), English multimedia artist
- Pam Ayres (born 1947), British poet, comedian, songwriter and presenter
- Paul Ayers (born 1961), Archdeacon of Leeds
- Phoebe Ayers, American librarian
- Randy Ayers (born 1956), American basketball coach
- Robert Ayers (born 1985), American football defensive end
- Ron Ayers (1932–2024), British aeronautical engineer and designer of ThrustSSC
- Rowan Ayers (1922–2008), British television producer and poet
- Roy Ayers (1940–2025), American vibraphonist, record producer and composer
- Roy E. Ayers (1882–1955), American politician
- Rufus A. Ayers (1849–1926), Virginia lawyer, businessman, and politician
- Sam Ayers, American actor
- Scott Ayers, American musician
- Stephen T. Ayers, American architect
- Thomas G. Ayers (1919–2007), Chicago businessman, philanthropist
- Tim Ayers (born 1958), Ohio politician
- Tony Ayers (1933–2016), former senior Australian public servant

== Places ==
- Ayers Rock, former name of Uluru, a rock formation in central Australia
- Ayers Creek, Antigua
- Ayers Creek Falls, Oregon
- Ayers House (Adelaide)
- Ayers Island (Maine)
- Ayers Island Reservoir, New Hampshire
- Ayers Kaserne, US army barracks in Germany
- Ayers Shop, Mississippi
- Ayers Township, Champaign County, Illinois
- Ayers, West Virginia

== Companies ==
- N.W. Ayers, American advertising agency
- Ayers Music Publishing Company, a fictional company in Ayn Rand's novel Atlas Shrugged
- Ayers Saint Gross, American architectural firm

== See also ==
- Ayres (disambiguation)
- Ayers Rock (disambiguation)
