= Moawhango West River =

Coordinates: 39°21′S 175°53′E

Location
- Country: New Zealand

Physical characteristics
- Mouth
  - location: Moawhango River

The Moawhango West River is a river of the Manawatū-Whanganui region in New Zealand. A tributary of the Moawhango River, it flows into the latter to the northeast of Lake Moawhango.

== See also ==
- List of rivers of New Zealand
