= Ayers Rock (disambiguation) =

Ayers Rock, officially known as Uluru/Ayers Rock, is a geological feature in Australia.

Ayers Rock may also refer to.

- Ayers Rock, an island in Lake Moawhango, New Zealand
- Ayers Rock (band), an Australian rock band
- Ayers Rock Airport, an airport in Australia
- Archeological Site CA-INY-134, an archeological site in the United States also called Ayer's Rock Pictograph Site

== See also ==
- Ayers (disambiguation)
