= Kaimanawa =

The New Zealand Māori word Kaimanawa relates to two separate things:

- The Kaimanawa Range of mountains, in the North Island
- Kaimanawa horses, a feral horse found in the area
