= The Wilson Sisters =

The Wilson Sisters may refer to:

- Jane and Louise Wilson, British artists, often known as part of the Young British Artists (YBA) generation
- Ann and Nancy Wilson, the only constant members of the rock band Heart
- Brittany and Tiffany Wilson, the sisters impersonated by Shawn and Marlon Wayans in the movie White Chicks
- Carnie and Wendy Wilson, members of the pop group Wilson Phillips
  - The Wilsons (album), recorded with Brian Wilson
- Vicki, Kelly, and Amanda Wilson, three New Zealand equestrian sisters famous for taming Kaimanawa horses

== See also ==
- Bad Animals Studio
