= Tongariro Power Scheme =

New Zealand hydroelectricity scheme

Tongariro power stations (Tokaanu, Rangipō, Mangaio)
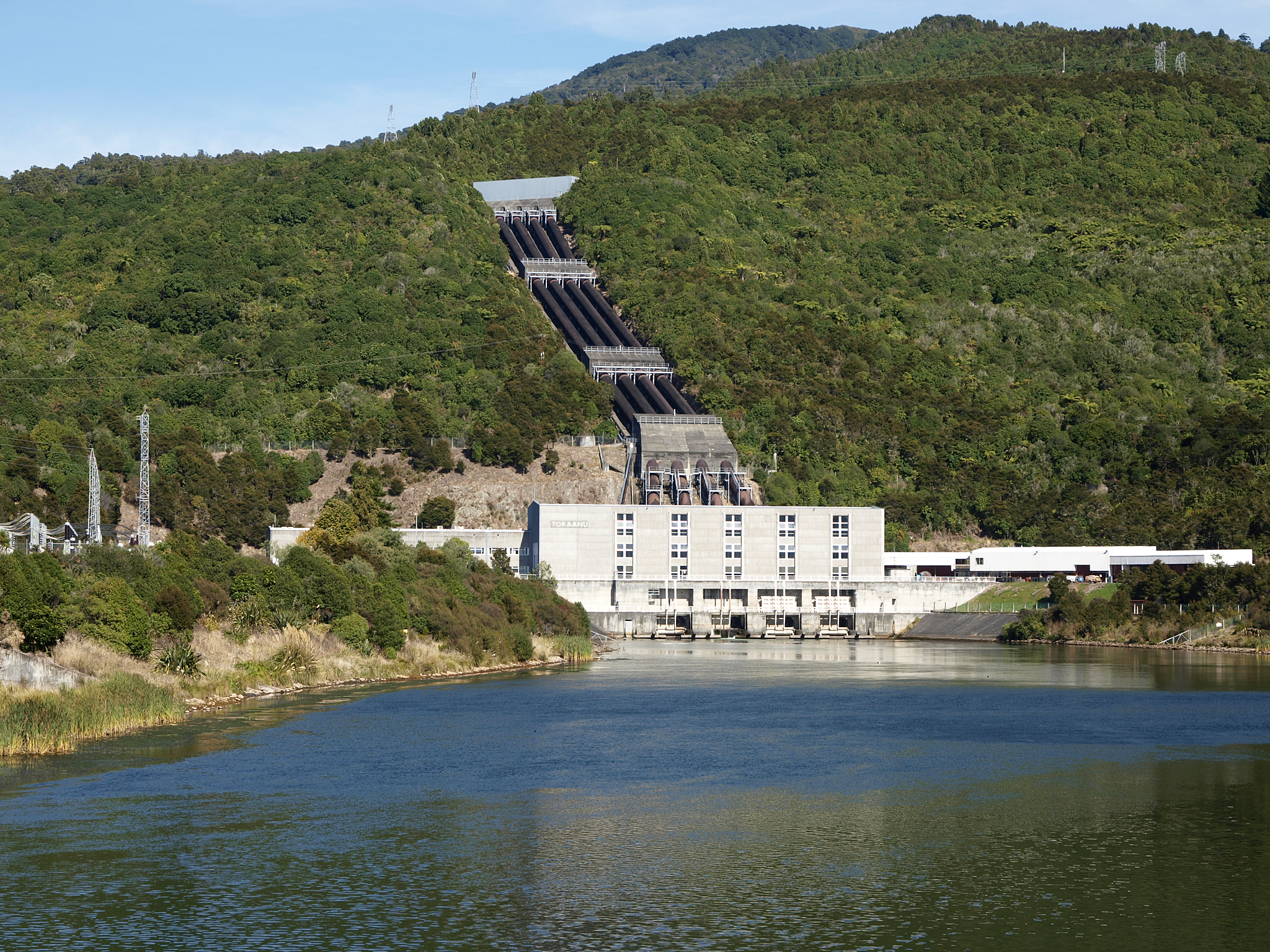
- Tokaanu power station
- Country: New Zealand
- Location: Central North Island
- Coordinates: 38°58′54″S 175°46′08″E
- Commission date: 1973 (Tokaanu); 1983 (Rangipō); 2008 (Mangaio)
- Owner: Genesis Energy

Power generation
- Units operational: Four (Tokaanu); Two (Rangipō); One (Mangaio)
- Nameplate capacity: 240 MW (Tokaanu); 120 MW (Rangipō); 2 MW (Mangaio)
- Annual net output: 1350 GWh (Total)

External links
- Commons: Related media on Commons

The Tongariro Power Scheme is a 360 MW hydroelectricity scheme in the central North Island of New Zealand. The scheme diverts water from tributaries of the Rangitīkei, Whangaehu, Whanganui, and Tongariro rivers. These rivers drain a 2,600-square-kilometre (1,000 sq mi) area including Ruapehu, Ngauruhoe, Tongariro and the western Kaimanawa Ranges. The water diverted from these rivers is sent through canals and tunnels to generate electricity at three hydro power stations, Rangipō (120 MW), Tokaanu (240 MW) and Mangaio (2 MW). The water is then discharged into Lake Taupō where it adds to the water storage in the lake and enables additional electricity generation in the succession of power stations down the Waikato River.

The scheme generates approximately 1350 GWh of electricity annually, and contributes 4 percent of New Zealand's electricity generation. It is currently operated by electricity generation company Genesis Energy.

From its inception to the current day tensions have existed between the need to generate electricity and cultural and environmental issues.

== History ==
Plans to realise the potential of electricity generation in the central North Island volcanic plateau date back to the early years of the 20th century. A Californian engineer, L.M. Hancock, visited New Zealand in 1903 and, with engineer P.S. Hay, surveyed localities where power could be generated. In 1904 Hay's report to the government New Zealand Water-Powers identified a number of potential sites around the central plateau. These included Lake Rotoaira, the Whakapapa River and the Whangaehu River. A dam could be built on the Poutu River feeding into Lake Rotoaira and the amount of power generated could be increased by adding water from Tongariro or Ngauruhoe. While he identified the generation potential of the Whangaehu River, Hay noted that it was polluted by volcanic acids and chemicals making it unsuitable. Between the 1920s and 1950s a number of investigations on the potential of the volcanic plateau were undertaken by engineers, mostly in the Public Works Department. In 1955 the British consulting engineering company Sir Alexander Gibb & Partners was contracted to conduct preliminary investigations; they produced a preliminary report in 1957. The government authorised the scheme in 1958 through an Order in Council which allowed water to be taken from five catchments without giving notice or gaining consents and approved the scheme in 1964. Gibb and Partners conducted further field studies and more detailed design which culminated in their report in 1962 which recommended the construction of a power scheme in five stages:

1. The Western Diversions – diversions of the Whanganui River and other streams on the western side of Mt Ruapehu into Lake Rotoaira
2. The Tokaanu project – construction of the Tokaanu power station taking water from Lake Rotoaira
3. The Moawhango project – diversion of streams on the south side of Mt Ruapehu and the Moawhango River into two dams at Moawhango, and construction of a tunnel from Moawhango to the Tongariro River
4. The Rangipo project – diversion of water from the tributaries west of the Tongariro River to a dam on the river, and a power station at Rangipō
5. The Tongariro project – construction of the Kaimanawa power station on the Tongariro River upstream of Begg's Pool

The final project differed from Gibb's design: only one dam was built at Moawhango, the Kaimanawa station was not built, and an additional power station was built at Mangaio. The four stage project commenced in 1964 and was completed in 1983: the Western Diversion from 1964 to 1971, the Tokaanu project (Rotoaira Diversion) from 1966 to 1973, the Eastern Diversion from 1969 to 1979, and the Rangipo project (Tongariro Diversion) from 1974 to 1983.

=== Government departments ===
The scheme was built by the Ministry of Works and the project engineers were Warren Gibson and Bert Dekker. The New Zealand Electricity Department (NZED) operated the generation and transmission of electricity. NZED became part of the Ministry of Energy before becoming part of the Electricity Corporation of New Zealand (ECNZ) in 1987. The government transferred all generation and transmission to ECNZ in 1990. In 1999 with the reform of the energy sector and break-up of ECNZ the Tongariro scheme was transferred to Genesis Energy.

== Scheme ==
=== Western Diversion: Whakapapa River to Lake Rotoaira ===
The Western Diversion was the first part of the Scheme to be constructed between 1964 and 1971. It starts at the Whakapapa River, taking water into a 16.5-kilometre (10.3 mi) long tunnel to Lake Te Whaiau; intake structures collect water from the Ōkupata, Taurewa, Tāwhitikuri, and Mangatepōpō streams along the way. The Te Whaiau dam is an earth-fill dam 13.7 metres (45 ft) high and 54.8 metres (180 ft) metres long.

Water from the Whanganui River is diverted via a short tunnel into the Te Whaiau Stream, which joins the water from the Whakapapa and other intakes, all flowing into the Te Whaiau dam. Both tunnels, begun in 1967, were constructed by the Italian construction company Codelfa-Cogefa which specialised in tunnelling. Water from Lake Te Whaiau flows into the Ōtamangākau Canal which feeds Lake Otamangakau, where water also flows from the Ōtamangākau Stream. Lake Ōtamangākau is formed by an earth-fill dam 20 metres (66 ft) high and 259.9 metres (853 ft) long.

From Lake Ōtamangākau, water from the Western Diversion is diverted into the 7-kilometre (4.3 mi) Wairehu Canal, which travels under State Highway 47 and into Lake Rotoaira, joining water from the Eastern Diversion. Lake Rotoaira is kept at a raised level by the Poutu Dam.

=== Rotoaira Diversion: Lake Rotoaira to Lake Taupō ===
Water stored in Lake Rotoaira from both the Eastern and Western Diversions goes from the northern end of Lake Rotoaira into the 6.1-kilometre (3.8 mi) Tokaanu Tunnel to the Tokaanu Power Station. The tunnel was constructed by Downer and Associates between 1968 and 1973 and was beset with difficulties caused by water inflow and thermal activity. The tunnel passes under State Highway 47 and through the saddle between Pihanga and Mount Tihia to penstocks dropping 180 metres (590 ft) to the Tokaanu Power Station. After passing through the station, the water is discharged into the 3.8-kilometre (2.4 mi) Tokaanu Tailrace Canal.

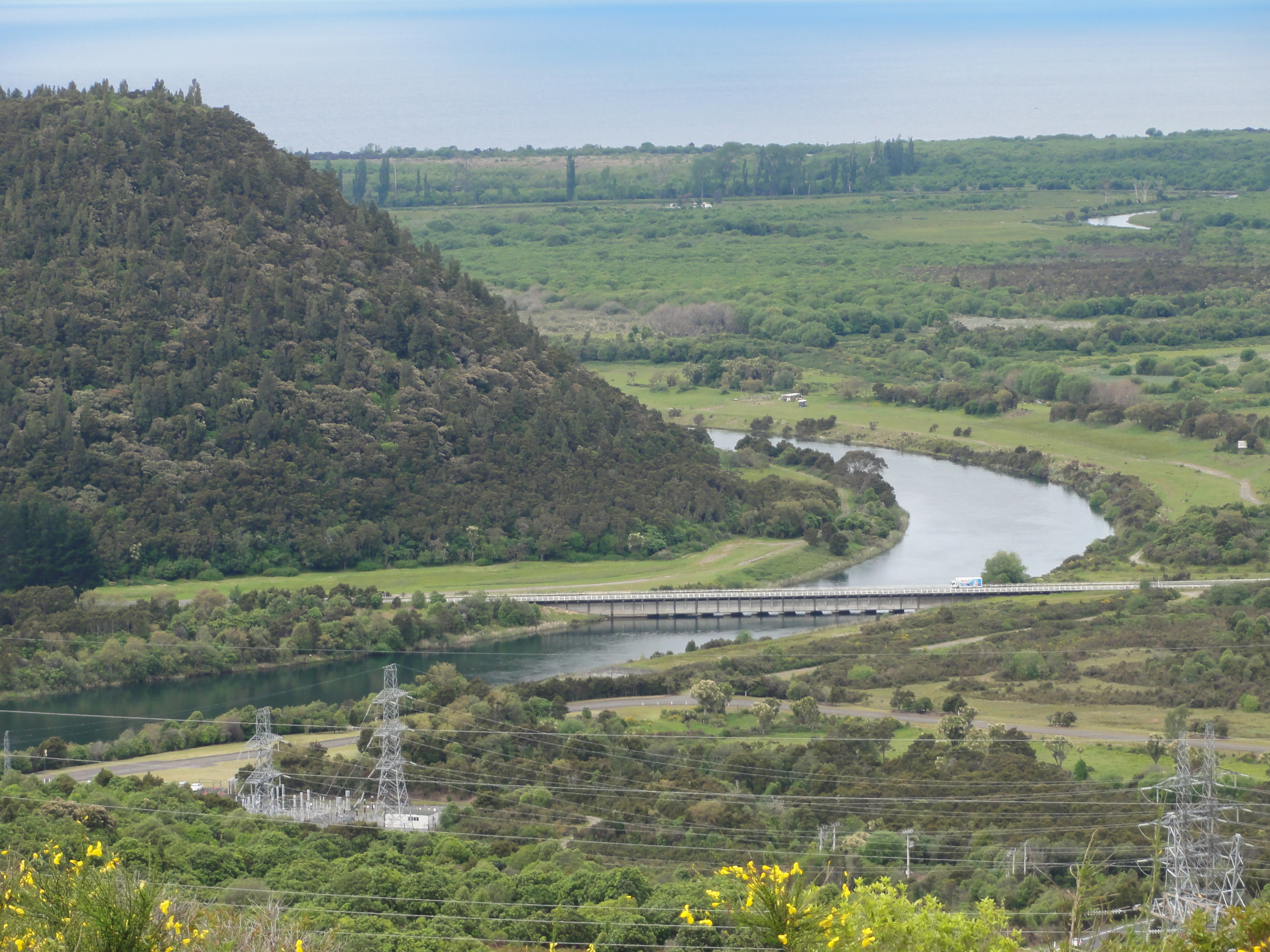
Tokaanu tailrace and SH41 bridge, 2011

The canal passes under the Tokaanu Tailrace Bridge, a combined road bridge and aqueduct. State Highway 41 travels over the top of the bridge. As part of the overall development, the Tokaanu Stream, an important trout spawning stream, was preserved by diverting it through an aqueduct under the road surface. The Tokaanu tailrace canal discharges into Lake Taupō at Waihi Bay.

=== Eastern Diversion: Whangaehu River to Rangipō Dam ===
The Eastern Diversion takes water from 22 streams which are tributaries of the Whangaehu River. Intake structures on the streams feed the water into the 8.4-kilometre (5.2 mi) long underground Wāhianoa Aqueduct. The aqueduct heads eastward, passing under the actual Whangaehu River, but not taking any water from it due to the fact it drains Mount Ruapehu's crater lake and is too acidic. At the end of the aqueduct, near the Desert Road (State Highway 1), water is then diverted through the 1.4-kilometre (0.87 mi) Mangaio Tunnel under the State Highway. The water goes either to the Mangaio Power Station or to a drop structure to enter Lake Moawhango via the Mangaio Stream. Construction of the aqueduct and tunnel was completed in 1975.

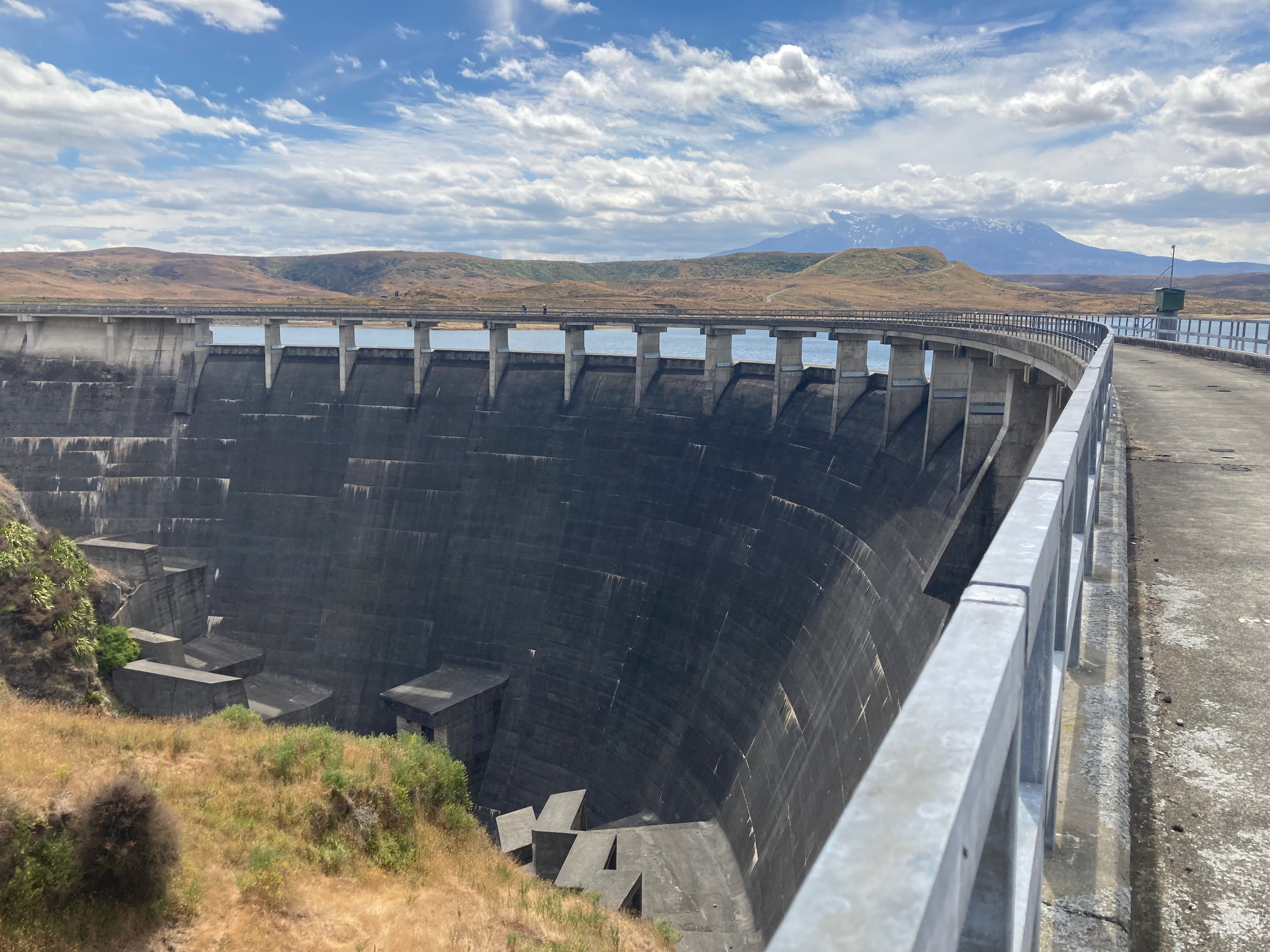
Moawhango dam and lake looking towards Mt Ruapehu, 2022

Lake Moawhango is an artificial lake made by the damming of the Moawhango River and Mangaio Stream. The dam, designed by Gibb and Partners, was the last major project in New Zealand to be designed in imperial units. It is New Zealand's highest gravity arch dam in both altitude and physical height.Filled in 1979 it is 325 metres (1,066 ft) long and 68 metres (223 ft) high. Water from Lake Moawhango is then diverted into the 19.2-kilometre (11.9 mi) Moawhango Tunnel to the Rangipō Dam.

The Moawhango tunnel was built by the Italian construction company Codelfa-Cogefar using experienced Italian tunnellers. It was begun in 1969 but due to difficult tunnelling conditions, which included faultlines, rock falls and incoming water, it took 10 years to complete. In 1980 the tunnel held the world record for being a hydro tunnel constructed from two headings. The tunnel was commissioned in December 1979 on the feast of Santa Barbara, the patron saint of tunnellers, and opened by the prime minister Robert Muldoon.

=== Tongariro Diversion: Rangipō Dam to Lake Rotoaira ===
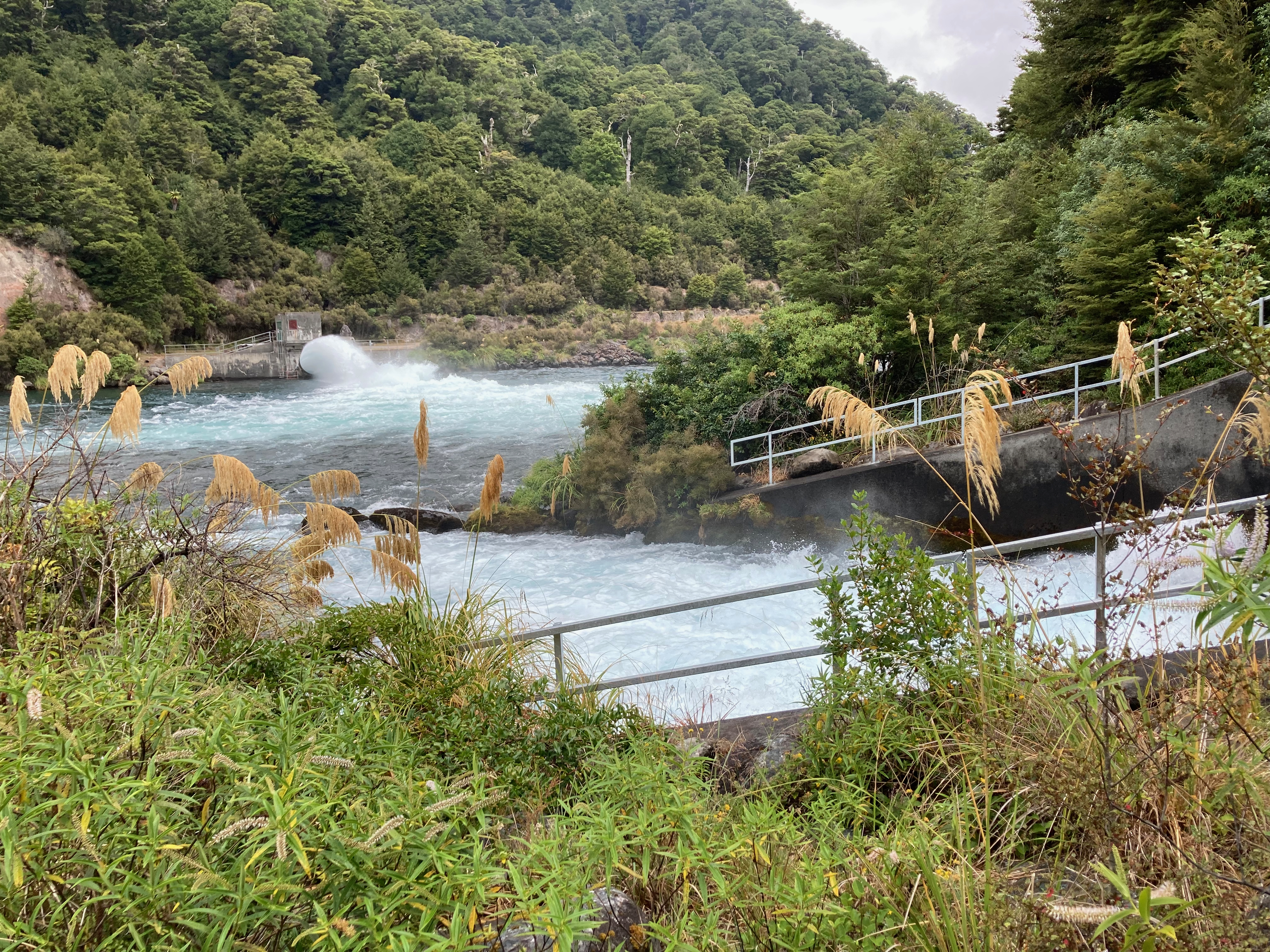
Rangipō dam, outfalls of Waihohonu tunnel (foreground) and Moawhango Tunnel (background), 2022

Water from the Moawhango Tunnel and the Waihohonu Stream flows into the Rangipō Dam which is built on the Tongariro River. To the west of Rangipō, originating on the slopes of Mt Ngauruhoe, the Waihohonu Stream flows into a concrete gravity dam (intake structure) 15 metres (49 ft) high and 32 metres (105 ft) long. It was constructed in 1984. Water from the dam is then diverted via the 960-metre (3,150 ft) Waihohonu Tunnel to the Rangipō Dam. This tunnel was built by the Ministry of Works and completed in 1981.

The Rangipō Dam is a concrete gravity dam 23 metres (75 ft) high and 150 metres (490 ft) long. It contains 5700 tonnes of reinforcing steel and 81,000 cubic metres of concrete. The lake behind the Rangipō Dam acts as a head pond to the Rangipō Power Station. Water from the lake is then taken into the 8-kilometre (5.0 mi) Rangipō Headrace Tunnel to Rangipō Power Station, 63 metres (207 ft) below ground level. The headrace tunnel, completed in 1980, and the access tunnel to the power station, completed in 1976, were both built by Codelfa-Cogefa.

After passing through Rangipō Power Station, the water flows through the 3-kilometre (1.9 mi) Rangipō Tailrace Tunnel to the Poutū Intake at Beggs Pool on the Tongariro River.

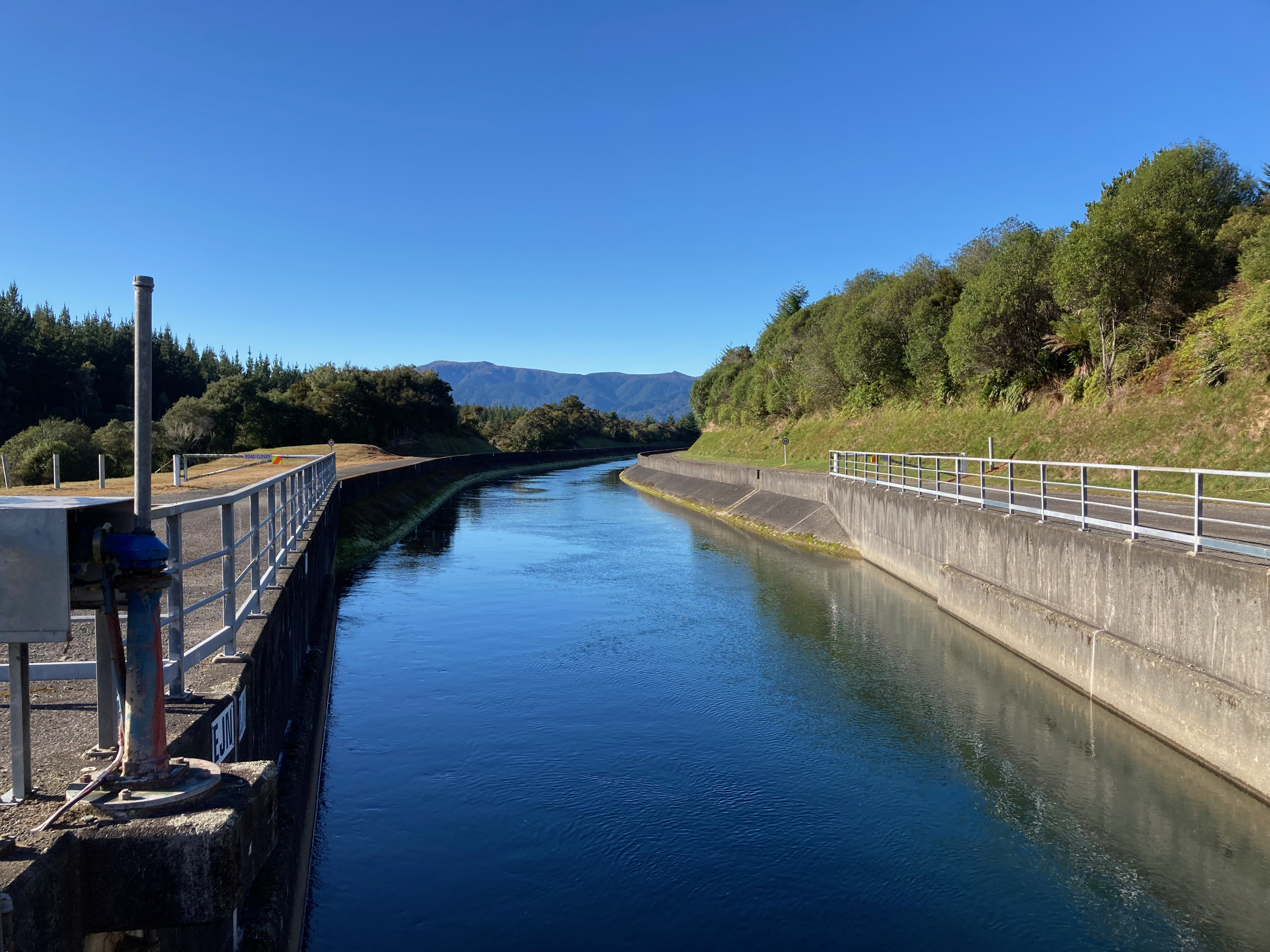
Poutu Canal flowing into the Poutu Dam. Looking toward the Kaimanawa Range, 2022

After taking on more water from the Tongariro River (which now includes water from the eastern slopes of Ngauruhoe and Tongariro), the water is diverted through the 2.8-kilometre (1.7 mi) long concrete-lined Poutū Tunnel into the 5.6-kilometre (3.5 mi) long concrete-lined Poutū Canal which was constructed by the Ministry of Works and Development The Canal, which is on average 4.3 metres (14 ft) deep, travels under State Highway 1 and under State Highway 46 to the Poutū Dam. The dam, which is 13 metres (43 ft) high and 150 metres (490 ft) wide, has two functions: it controls the water flowing into Lake Rotoaira via the Rotoaira Channel and controls outflow from the lake into the Poutu Stream. Before the scheme the Poutu Stream was the natural outlet for Lake Rotoaira but once the scheme was operational the Tokaanu Tunnel became the lake's principal outlet. The lake level was raised about 50 centimetres (20 in). In Lake Rotoaira water from the Eastern Diversion merges with water from the Western Diversion.

== Power stations ==
Three power stations exist on the scheme, Rangipō, Tokaanu and Mangaio. The power stations are managed from a control room at Tokaanu.

=== Rangipō ===
Rangipō Power Station is located on the Eastern Diversion. The station was commissioned in 1983, and was built 63 metres (207 ft) underground beneath the Kaimanawa Forest Park, to minimise visual impact. It was the second underground hydro station in New Zealand, after Manapōuri Power Station. Water flows into the powerhouse through a vertical penstock 180 metres (590 ft) long which splits into two horizontal penstocks 150 metres (490 ft) long. The powerhouse cavern is 55 metres (180 ft) long, 18 metres (59 ft) wide and 36 metres (118 ft) high, and is reached via a 650-metre-long (2,130 ft) access tunnel. The power station has two hydro turbine generator sets, each rated at 60 MW, giving the station a total capacity of 120 MW. The tailrace tunnel, which flows into the Tongariro River, is 3-kilometre (1.9 mi) long.

Rangipō Power Station connects to the single-circuit 220 kV Bunnythorpe to Wairakei line (BPE-WRK-A) via a short 220 kV twin-circuit deviation line (RPO-DEV-A).

=== Tokaanu ===
Tokaanu Power Station is located on the Rotoaira Diversion of the scheme on the northern slopes of Mount Tihia. It was commissioned in 1973. Water from Lake Rotoaira is taken through the Tokaanu Tunnel into four penstocks.

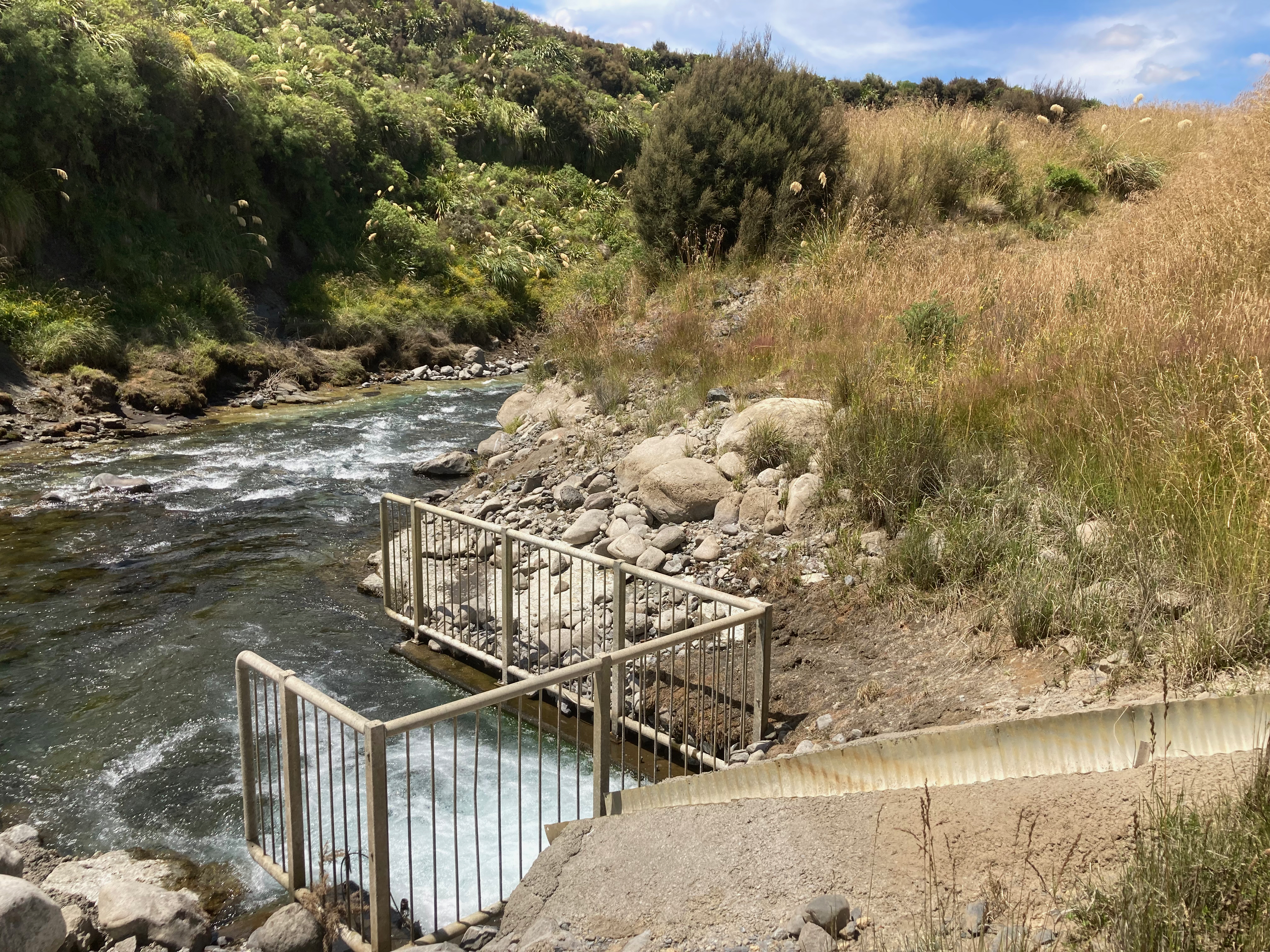
Mangaio Power Station outfall into the Mangaio Stream, 2022

The power station has four hydro turbine generator sets, each rated at 60 MW, giving the station a total capacity of 240 MW. Tokaanu houses the control room for the entire Tongariro Power Scheme.

Tokaanu Power Station connects to the two single-circuit 220 kV Bunnythorpe to Whakamaru lines (BPE-WKM-A and BPE-WKM-B) directly south of the station.

=== Mangaio ===
The power station was constructed in 2007–2008 and commissioned in 2008. It has a generating capacity of almost 2 MW.

== Environmental and cultural issues ==
Water from over 60 rivers and streams flowing from the Tongariro National Park catchment was taken into the scheme. Changes in river flows can cause silt build-up, changes in water velocity, temperature and water purity which in turn affects trout spawning and fishing, and the habitats of native species such as eels. This gave rise to conflicts between environmental and cultural issues and the need to generate electricity. Desmond Bovey's book on the Tongariro National Park put it this way:

Depending on your sensibilities, the scheme can be viewed as either a bold and ingenious feat of engineering, or alternatively as a high-handed grab of the headwaters of almost every river on the volcanic plateau. The truth, in my opinion, is that it is both - technically brilliant and morally brazen.

The Tongariro Power Scheme was conceived and commissioned at a time when Māori values were either not considered or dismissed. The Ministry of Works met with Ngāti Tūwharetoa in 1955 to discuss land rights and fishing but the other iwi with interests in the diversion of the Whanganui River and its headwaters were not consulted before or during construction. These included Ngāti Rangi (the iwi south of Mt Ruapehu stretching from the Whanganui River to the Whangaehu River and the Moawhango River), Tamahaki and Whanganui iwi.

For the iwi the rivers and streams are tūpuna awa and are accorded ancestral heritage. The well-being of people cannot be separated from the well-being of the natural world as the spiritual and physical worlds are inter-connected. Tūpuna awa include the river beds, catchment areas, the habitats, fish and other biodiversity. Ngāti Rangi maintain that the flow of water from the mountains to the sea must not be broken. It is also an offence to Māori to mix waters from different tribal areas, or catchments. The rivers and springs were important sources of food. Eels lived in the tributaries of the Whangaehu River and would have had to pass through the river to migrate to the sea. Ngāti Rangi also bathed in the Whangaehu for its healing properties. Fishing also took place on the Moawhango River where the dam is now and the river was a key waterway used for east-west travel and trade with east coast iwi Ngāti Whitikaupeka.

The Planning Tribunal/Environment Court and High Court hearings in the late 1980s and early 1990s began a process of including Māori perspectives and values and consultation on the use of rivers. Genesis Energy signed an agreement with Ngāti Tūwharetoa to mitigate the effects of the scheme creating the Ngāti Tūwharetoa Genesis Energy Committee which distributes funds for educational, cultural and environmental purposes. Genesis continues to meet with iwi and relevant fishery, recreational and environmental groups, and the Defence Force to mitigate the effects of the scheme on the environment.

=== Effects on the Tongariro River ===
As far back as 1955 concerns were raised about the effects of the scheme on trout fisheries in the Tongariro River, in particular maintaining water flow for trout spawning, the effect on the feeding grounds in Lake Taupō and Lake Rotoaira, the access to fishing pools on the river, the removal of sediment from the river and the effect of the Rangipō power station on trout. The Environmental Impact Report on the Rangipō project was submitted to the Commission for the Environment in 1973.

=== Effects on the Western Diversion ===
Protests against the scheme arose as early as 1955 from the Waimarino Acclimatisation Society who opposed the Whanganui River diversion into Lake Rotoaira; this was followed in the early 1960s by concerns about the effects on the Whanganui River and the Whanganui harbour. In 1964 the Taumarunui Borough Council raised concerns that reduction of the flow of water in the river would affect the operation of the Piriaka power station but an agreement was reached to maintain water flows. Also in 1964 the artist Peter McIntyre, who had a holiday house at Kakahi on the Whanganui River stated that water should not be taken when rivers belong to all New Zealanders and that by interrupting and reducing the flow of water there would be pollution and loss of trout fishing. He was supported by zoologist John Salmon who called for research into the long-term environmental effects of the scheme. Once the Western Diversion had been commissioned in 1971 opposition continued from the New Zealand Canoeing Association who called for higher flow in the Whanganui River and the National Water Conservation Organisation requesting that desirable minimum flows be fixed. In 1987 water flowing from the Whakapapa Intake back into the river was about 5% of the normal flow.

In 2012 Genesis partnered with local iwi Ngāti Hikairo on an eel restoration programme which enabled eels to maintain the migratory patterns necessary for their life cycle. Since 2011 Genesis has also partnered with the Department of Conservation on a blue duck/whio recovery programme which involves trapping predators on the Whakapapa, Wanganui and Mangatepopo rivers.

=== Lake Rotoaira and Ngāti Tūwharetoa ===
Lake Rotoaira has cultural and historical significance to local iwi Ngāti Tūwharetoa and trout fishing licences, which are managed by the Lake Rotoaira Trust, are an important source of revenue. Ownership of the lake was vested in the Trust in 1956 with the trustees representing the hapu of Ngāti Tūwharetoa. One of the Trust's roles was "to negotiate with the Crown on the use of the lake for electricity generation". As a result of construction work on access roads and near spawning streams on the Western Diversion the decline of fish stocks in the Lake was being reported in the late 1960s. During the construction phase the Ministry of Works wanted greater control over, and ownership of, the lake. The iwi would not concede ownership and in a 1972 agreement the Crown was allowed control over the water for electricity generation but discharged from any compensation claims caused by environmental damage or adverse effects on the fishing. In 1991 the Trust lodged a claim, Wai 178, with the Waitangi Tribunal asking that the agreement be renegotiated and that the Trust be paid for the use of the lake. Little study had been done on the effect of the scheme on the Lake's fisheries before the scheme but by 1997, when the resource consent came up for renewal, the iwi and the Trust were concerned that trout stocks were declining. It was found that the scheme had caused a decline of trout and kōaro and an increase of bullies. Renewal of the resource consent in 2001 required Genesis, under the Resource Management Act 1991, to consult with the Trust to implement a management plan to achieve an increase in the numbers of trout and kōaro. In 2013 the Waitangi Tribunal found that the Crown had not recompensed the iwi for the damage to the Lake and for its use to generate electricity. A 2015 Tribunal report acknowledged the harm that the Scheme had done not just to the Lake but to Ngāti Tūwharetoa's economic, social, cultural and spiritual well-being which included reduction in income from fishing licences. The Wai 178 claim was finally settled in the Ngāti Tūwharetoa Claims Settlement Act 2018.

=== The Eastern Diversion and Ngāti Rangi ===
Ngāti Rangi had been opposed to the use of water from rivers and streams in the Eastern Diversion since the 1970s. Diverting water into the project caused waterways to dry up and the loss of wildlife.

In 2001 Genesis was granted resource consents to continue diverting water from the Whanganui, Whangaehu and Moawhango rivers for 35 years but the iwi appealed to the Environment Court on the grounds that 35 years was too long. Ngāti Rangi requested that their values be considered alongside western science, recognition of their rights of ownership of tūpuna awa and for restoration of cultural and spiritual values lost in the diversion of the river flows. In 2004 the Court reduced the resource consent to 10 years taking on board cultural considerations under the Resource Management Act 1991. Genesis objected to the 10 year period taking the case to the High Court which in 2006 found that the shorter period was weighted in the iwi's favour and requested the Environment Court to reconsider the term. The iwi appealed the High Court decision. In 2009 the High Court found that the Environment Court could not reduce the consent to 10 years and required the two parties to find a solution. In 2010 Genesis and Ngāti Rangi formed a partnership to find ways to restore water flows in the rivers. Genesis's resource consent expires in 2039.

In 2017 the Crown and Ngāti Rangi reached an agreement in principle to settle historical Treaty of Waitangi claims followed by a settlement deed in 2018 which included arrangements for the governance of the Whangaehu River and protection of the river's catchment. The 2019 legislation created the framework called Te Waiū-o-Te-Ika which recognises the intrinsic connection between the awa and the iwi and hapū of the Whangaehu.

Some permanent flows have been reinstated in several waterways namely the Tokiāhuru, Wahianoa, Mākahikatoa and Tomowai streams. Monitoring the health of the Whangaehu catchment area has been part of the partnership between the iwi and Genesis. The following rivers have been monitored for clarity, temperature, acidity and oxygen levels: Tokiāhuru, Wāhianoa, Mākahikatoa, Tomowai and Whangaehu.

== Archaeological investigations ==
When the project was approved in 1965 it was agreed that the Historic Places Trust (now Heritage New Zealand) would work with Ngāti Tūwharetoa to identify and protect sites on Lake Rotoaira and the Tongariro. Site surveys and excavations were carried out from 1966 to 1971 during the project's construction phase by Trevor Hosking an archaeologist contracted by the Trust to work with the Ministry of Works. Hosking recorded 187 sites, many of them post-European contact. They included settlements, defensive sites and burial sites, some of which were excavated. A small settlement, dating from around the 1840s, was found at Opōtaka at the northern end of Lake Rotoaira and partial excavation of the site revealed several houses and a collection of traditional and European artefacts. In 2022 the local hapū received funding to restore the site. The site on State Highway 47 can be visited. After discussions with Ngāti Tūwharetoa Hosking excavated the Te Waiariki burial site which was in the path of the Tokaanu tailrace tunnel; the site was of great significance to the iwi. He found 55 burials including the remains of two missionaries Te Manihera and Kereopa who had been killed at Tokaanu in 1847. All the remains were reburied and the missionaries interred at St Pauls Church in Tokaanu. A site known as McDonnell's Redoubt was located near the Poutu Canal; built by Te Kooti it was later occupied by Colonel McDonnell. It was reconstructed but due to instability and high maintenance it was returned to a mound in 1977.

== See also ==
- List of power stations in New Zealand
- Tongariro National Park
- Waikato River
