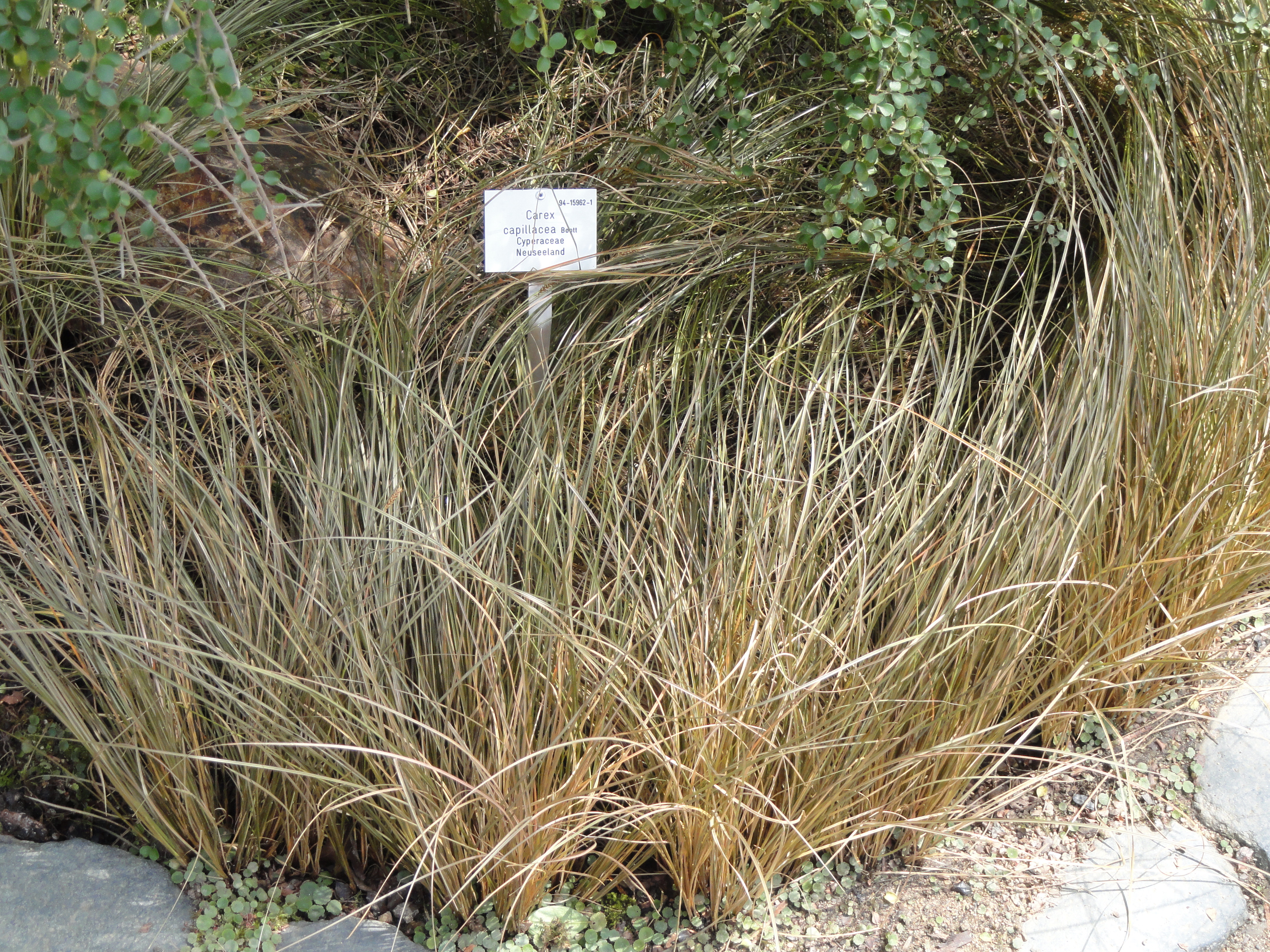
- Carex capillacea
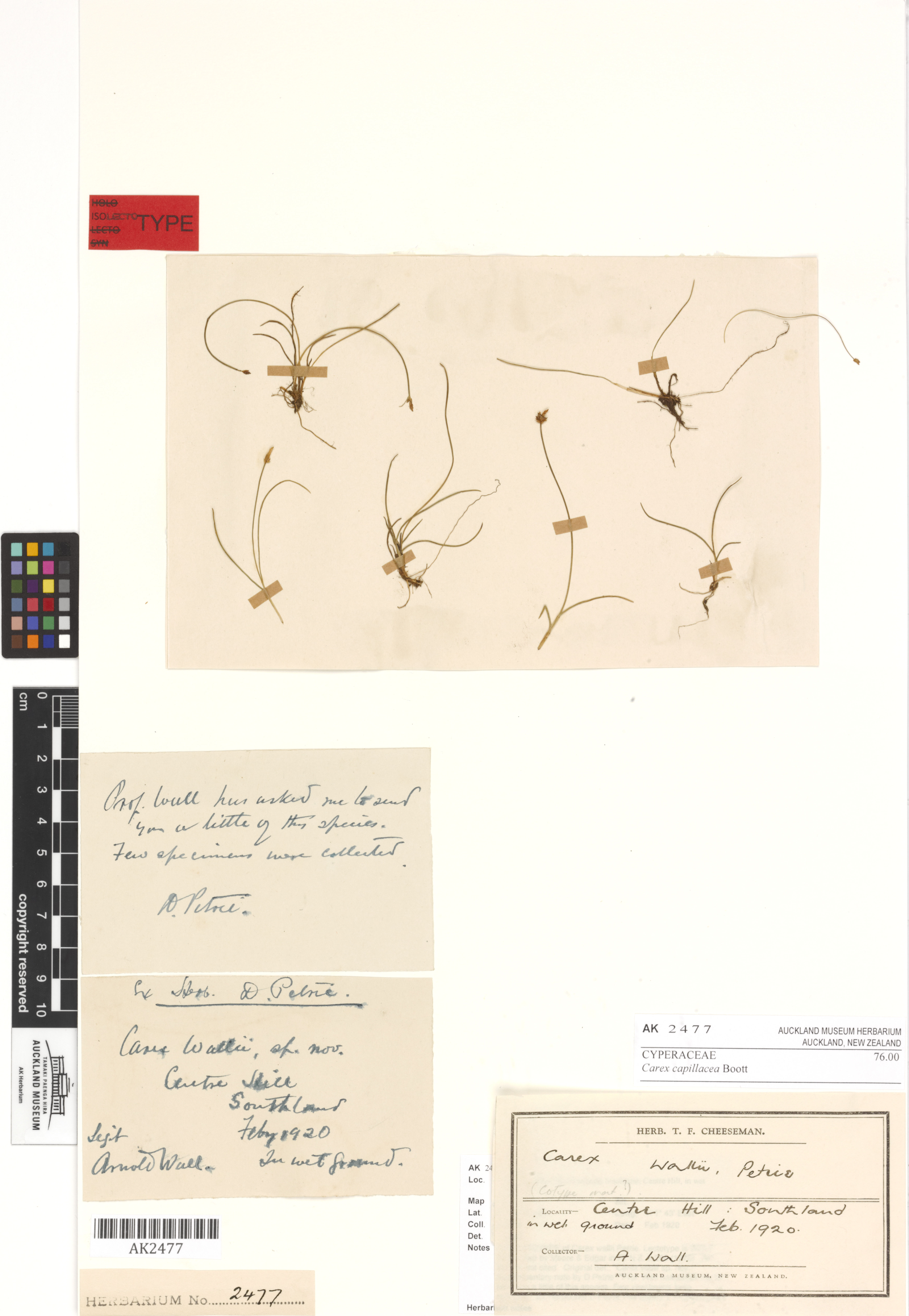
- Isolectotype: AM AK2477-1

Conservation status
- Nationally Vulnerable (NZ TCS)

Scientific classification
- Kingdom: Plantae
- Clade: Tracheophytes
- Clade: Angiosperms
- Clade: Monocots
- Clade: Commelinids
- Order: Poales
- Family: Cyperaceae
- Genus: Carex
- Species: C. capillacea

Binomial name
- Carex capillacea Boott
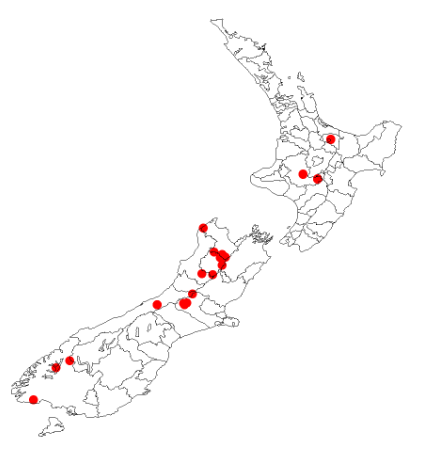
- Occurrence data from AVH

= Carex capillacea =

Species of grass-like plant

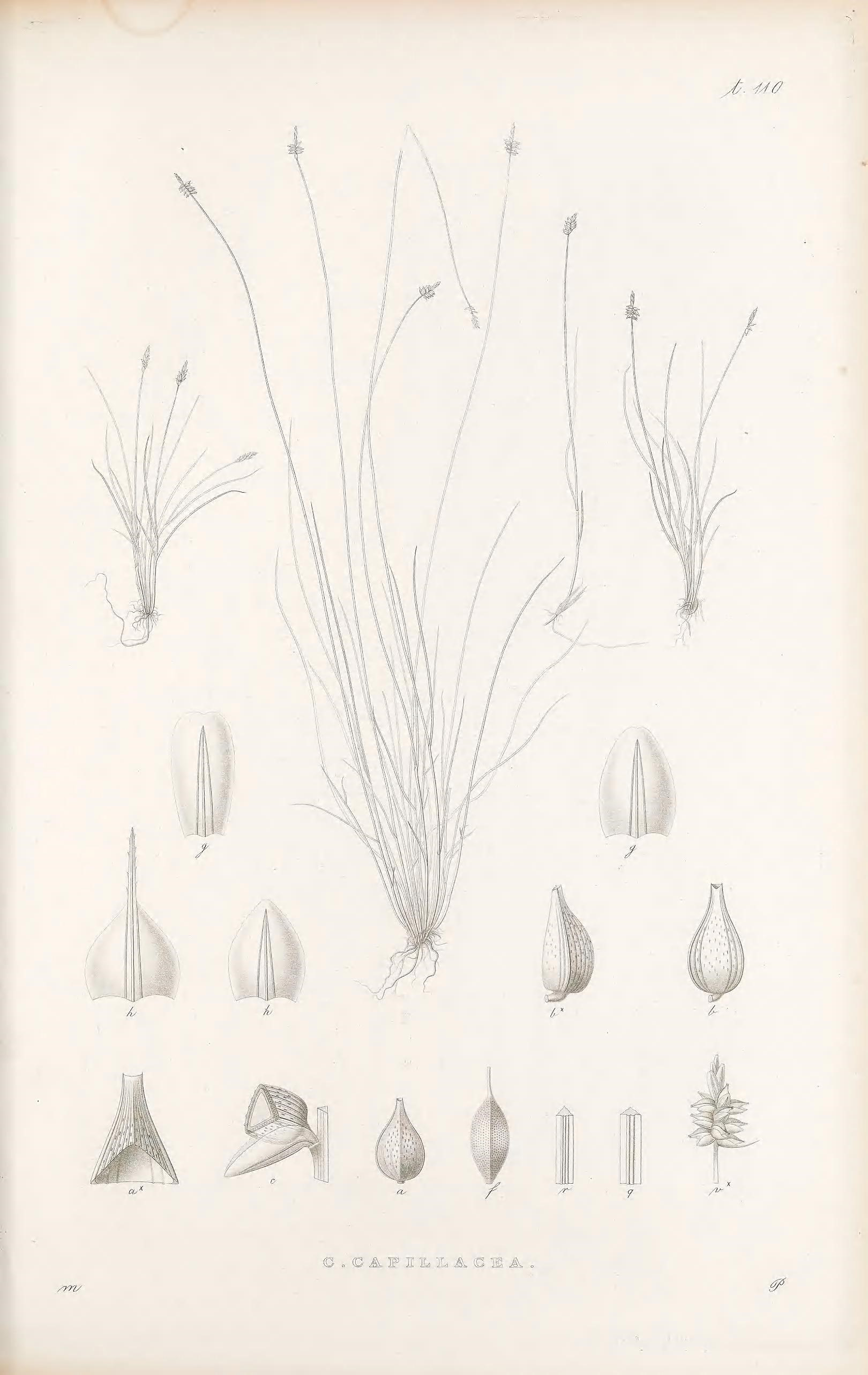
t.110 (Francis Boott, 1858)

Carex capillacea, common name yellowleaf sedge in Tasmania, is a species of sedge (in the Cyperaceae family) found in Assam, the far east of Russia, New Guinea, south east Australia, New Zealand, Malesia, China, Japan and India.

== Description ==
Carex capillacea is densely tufted. The culms (up to 30 cm (12 in) long by 0.5 mm (0.020 in)) are erect and slender. The leaves are usually shorter than culms, and the sheath is green to pale brown. The inflorescence is erect and has one spike. The male portion of the spike is above the female portion. The style is divided into three parts.

It flowers from October to December, fruits from October to July, and the nuts are dispersed by granivory and wind.

== Distribution and habitat ==
In New Zealand it is found on the North Island on the Waimarino Plain, and the Moawhango and in the South Island from Nelson and Marlborough south to the lakes of Te Anau, Manapouri, Hauroko and east to Lumsden. Its preferred habitat is bogs, seepages, and the margins of ponds and pools.

== Conservation status ==
Assessments under the New Zealand Threat Classification System (NZTCS), declared it to be "At Risk – Naturally Uncommon" (NU) in 2013, and in 2017 to be "Threatened – Nationally Vulnerable" (NV). In Tasmania, it is declared "Threatened".

== Taxonomy and naming ==
Carex capillacea was first described in 1858 by Francis Boott from specimens collected in the temperate eastern Himalayas at 10,000 to 12,000 feet (3,000 to 3,700 m) by Joseph Dalton Hooker in Sikkim and by William Griffith in Bhutan.

The specific epithet, capillacea, derives from the Latin capillus "hair" or "thread", and thus describes the plant as being thread-like.
