= Ayers Creek Falls =

- Interactive map of Ayers Creek Falls
- Location: South of Silver Falls State Park
- Coordinates: 44.81182°N 122.58835°W
- Type: Plunge
- Elevation: 1,494 ft (455 m)
- Total height: 79 ft (24 m)
- Average flow rate: 5 cu ft/s (0.14 m^{3}/s)

Ayers Falls, is a waterfall located on the outside edge of Santiam State Forest near Mehama, in Marion County, in the U.S. state of Oregon. It is located in an area on the west foothills where Mount Hood National Forest meets with the Middle Santiam Wilderness.

Ayers Falls is created along the course of Ayers Creek, which is the smallest tributary of Stout Creek. Ayers Falls is one of several waterfalls in the region.

== See also ==
- List of waterfalls in Oregon
