= Moawhango =

- Rural community
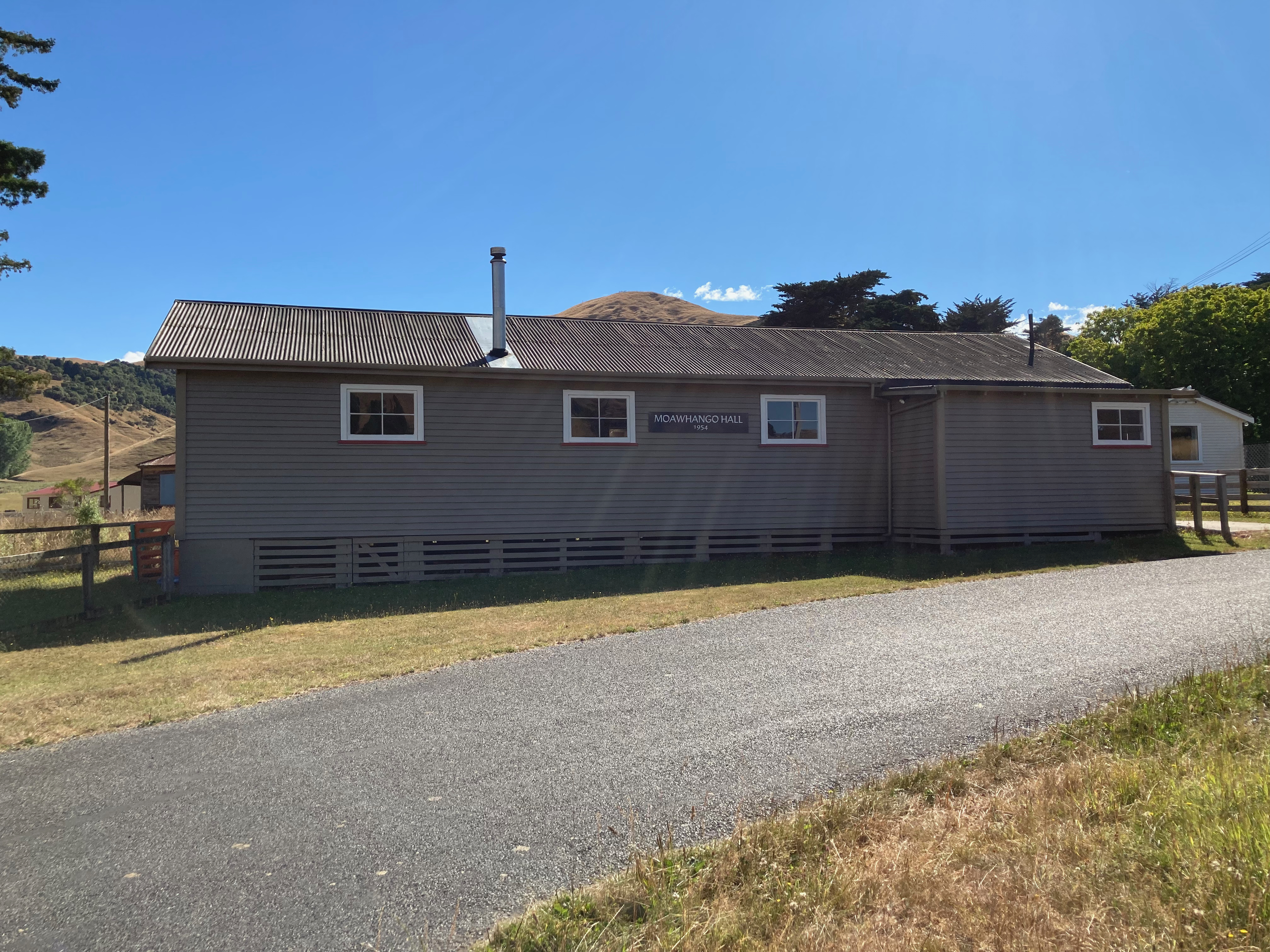
- Moawhango Hall, January 2022
- Interactive map of Moawhango
- Coordinates: 39°34′52.1″S 175°51′42.8″E
- Country: New Zealand
- Region: Manawatū-Whanganui
- Territorial authority: Rangitikei District
- Wards: Northern General Ward; Tiikeitia ki Uta (Inland) Māori Ward
- Community: Taihape Community
- Electorates: Rangitīkei; Te Tai Hauāuru (Māori)

Government
  - Territorial Authority: Rangitikei District Council
  - Regional council: Horizons Regional Council
  - Mayor of Rangitikei: Andy Watson
  - Rangitīkei MP: Suze Redmayne
  - Te Tai Hauāuru MP: Debbie Ngarewa-Packer

Area
  - Total: 460.19 km^{2} (177.68 sq mi)

Population (2023 Census)
  - Total: 132
  - Density: 0.287/km^{2} (0.743/sq mi)

Moawhango is a rural community in the northern part of Rangitikei District of the Manawatū-Whanganui region of New Zealand's North Island. It is situated 19 kilometres (12 miles) north of Taihape and 91 km northeast of Marton. Nearby Moawhango are located Moawhango River and Lake Moawhango.

== History and culture ==
Moawhango is bastion of cultural engagement within the iwi boundary of Ngāti Whitikaupekaa. Originally known to local Māori as Te Riu o Puanga, during European settlement the valley became known as Moawhango. There are two marae within the valley, Te Riu o Puanga marae which holds the whare rūnanga (ancestral meeting house) Oruamatua; and Moawhango marae where the whare puni (ancestral sleeping house) of Whitikaupeka stands. Ngāti Whitikaupeka occupy the northern boundary for the Mōkai Pātea confederation of iwi, which includes Ngāi Te Ohuake extending eastward to the summit of the Ruahine range, Ngāti Tamakōpiri to the west, and Ngāti Hauiti to the south. Through intricate whakapapa (genealogy) connections, Ngāti Whitikaupeka are also affiliated to Ngāti Tūwharetoa and Ngāti Kahungunu, and maintain their independent autonomy on the lands that surround Moawhango, while affirming their complex whakapapa relationships with others.

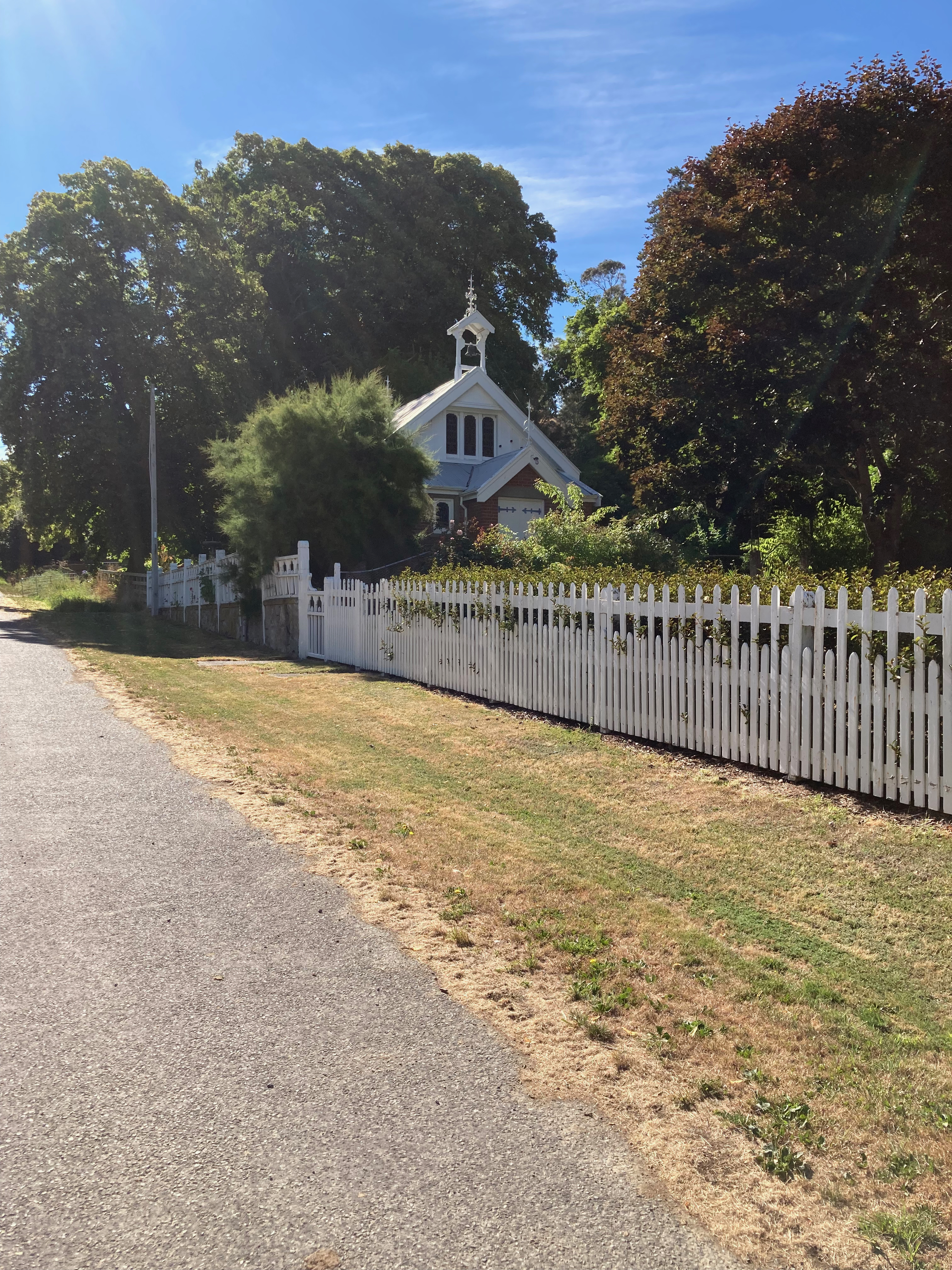
Batley Memorial Chapel, January 2022

=== Historic buildings ===
There are three historic buildings in the Moawhango area with Category I and II listings by Heritage New Zealand: the Birch Homestead has a Category I listing and the Batley Memorial Chapel and Whitikaupeka Church are Category II.

The Batley Memorial Chapel was built in 1902 by Robert and Emily Batley as a memorial to their daughter Nellie who drowned in 1899. It was designed by Alfred Atkins in Gothic Revival style and built from locally made bricks. There is also a shearing shed built in 1900 and other historic buildings on the Batley farm.

Whitikaupeka Church was built between 1903 and 1905 by the hapū Ngāti Whiti to commemorate tribal elders. It is built of wood and the design is attributed by Alfred Atkins.

The Birch Homestead built by Azim and William Birch dates from 1868; it is a rare example of a house constructed from cob.

== Geography ==
Moawhango River is a 62 km long river with its sources in the Kaimanawa Range and ending at Lake Moawhango. It passes through the town and then outflows into the Rangitikei River southeast of Taihape. Lake Moawhango contains a large population of wild rainbow trout.

== Government and politics ==
=== Local government ===
Moawhango forms part of the Northern ward of the Rangitikei District Council, which elects two of the eleven district councillors. The current Mayor of Rangitikei is Andy Watson.

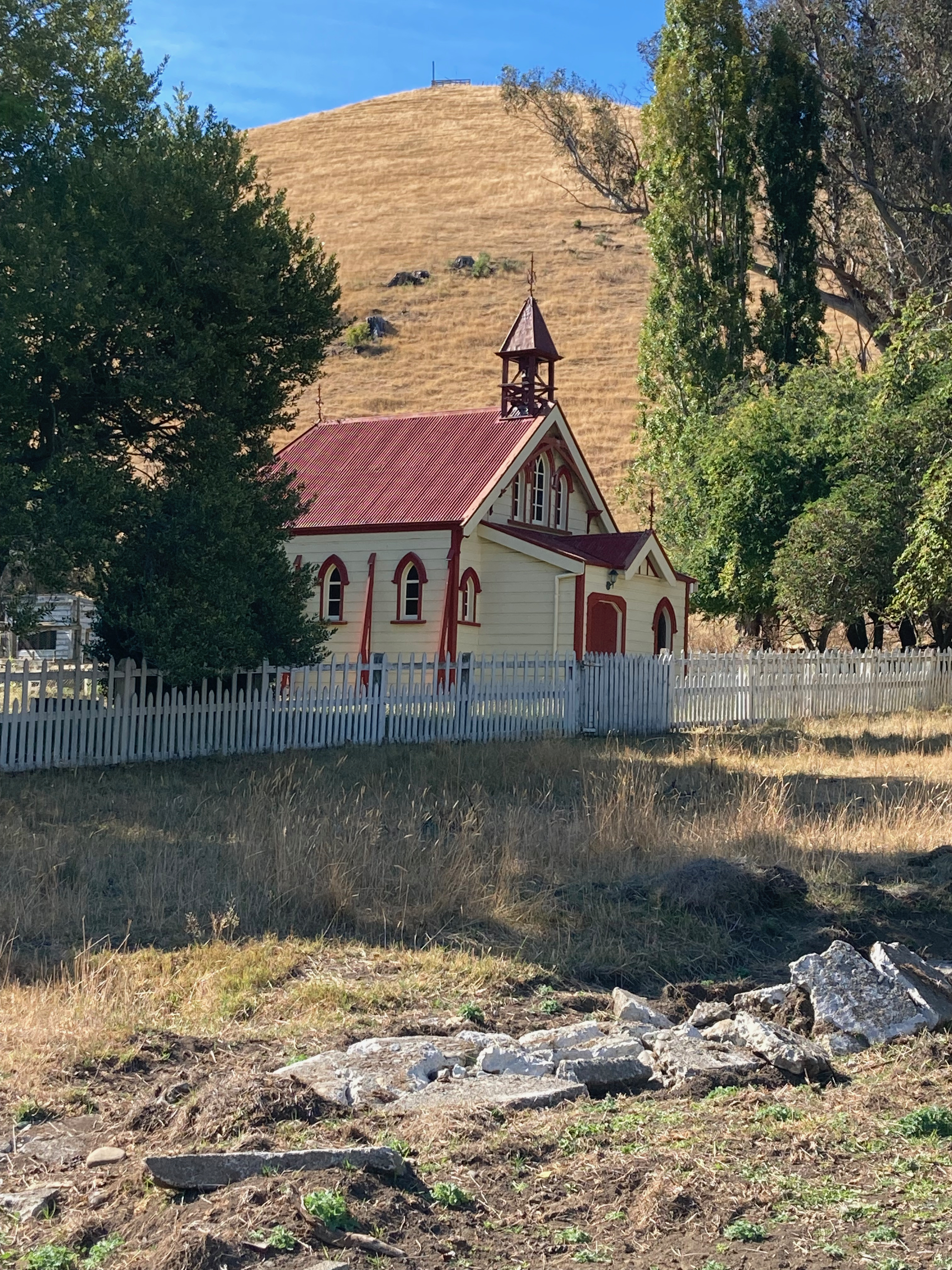
Whitikaupeka Church, Moawhango

=== National government ===
Moawhango, like much of the rest of the Rangitikei District, is located in the general electorate of Rangitīkei and in the Māori electorate of Te Tai Hauāuru. Rangitīkei is a safe National Party seat since the 1938 election with the exception of 1978–1984 when it was held by Bruce Beetham of the Social Credit Party. Since 2011, it is held by Suze Redmayne.

Te Tai Hauāuru is a more volatile seat, having been held by three different parties since 1996, i.e. New Zealand First, Te Pāti Māori and the Labour Party.

== Demographics ==
Moawhango locality covers 460.19 km^{2} (177.68 sq mi). It is part of the larger Mokai Patea statistical area.

Historical population
| Year | Pop. | ±% p.a. |
|---|---|---|
| 2006 | 171 | — |
| 2013 | 141 | −2.72% |
| 2018 | 114 | −4.16% |
| 2023 | 132 | +2.98% |

Moawhango had a population of 132 in the 2023 New Zealand census, an increase of 18 people (15.8%) since the 2018 census, and a decrease of 9 people (−6.4%) since the 2013 census. There were 78 males and 54 females in 48 dwellings. 2.3% of people identified as LGBTIQ+. The median age was 32.5 years (compared with 38.1 years nationally). There were 27 people (20.5%) aged under 15 years, 36 (27.3%) aged 15 to 29, 60 (45.5%) aged 30 to 64, and 12 (9.1%) aged 65 or older.

People could identify as more than one ethnicity. The results were 84.1% European (Pākehā), and 36.4% Māori. English was spoken by 97.7%, Māori by 6.8%, and other languages by 2.3%. No language could be spoken by 2.3% (e.g. too young to talk). The percentage of people born overseas was 4.5, compared with 28.8% nationally.

Religious affiliations were 34.1% Christian, 4.5% Māori religious beliefs, 2.3% New Age, and 2.3% other religions. People who answered that they had no religion were 56.8%, and 6.8% of people did not answer the census question.

Of those at least 15 years old, 15 (14.3%) people had a bachelor's or higher degree, 63 (60.0%) had a post-high school certificate or diploma, and 27 (25.7%) people exclusively held high school qualifications. The median income was $53,000, compared with $41,500 nationally. 6 people (5.7%) earned over $100,000 compared to 12.1% nationally. The employment status of those at least 15 was 66 (62.9%) full-time and 18 (17.1%) part-time.

== Transport ==
To get to the nearest town, Taihape, it is a 19 km drive south via Te Moehau Road and Spooners Hill Road. State Highway 1 goes through Taihape, connecting Cape Reinga and Wellington; through this state highway InterCity buses can be used with ten daily coach services. These include: Auckland–Wellington, Wellington–Auckland and Tauranga–Wellington (throughout different times of the day).

== Education ==
Moawhango School is a co-educational bilingual (English and Māori) state primary school for Year 1 to 8 students, with a roll of 28 as of July 2026. It opened in 1897 as Moawhango Maori School.
