= Ayers Rock (New Zealand) =

Island in New Zealand

- Interactive map of Ayers Rock

Geography
- Coordinates: 39.395472°S 175.748917°E

Administration
- New Zealand
- Region: Manawatū-Whanganui

Demographics
- Population: uninhabited

Ayers Rock is an island in the west side of Lake Moawhango, an artificial lake in New Zealand.

== See also ==
- List of islands of New Zealand
