= Moawhango River =

Coordinates: 39°43′S 175°56′E

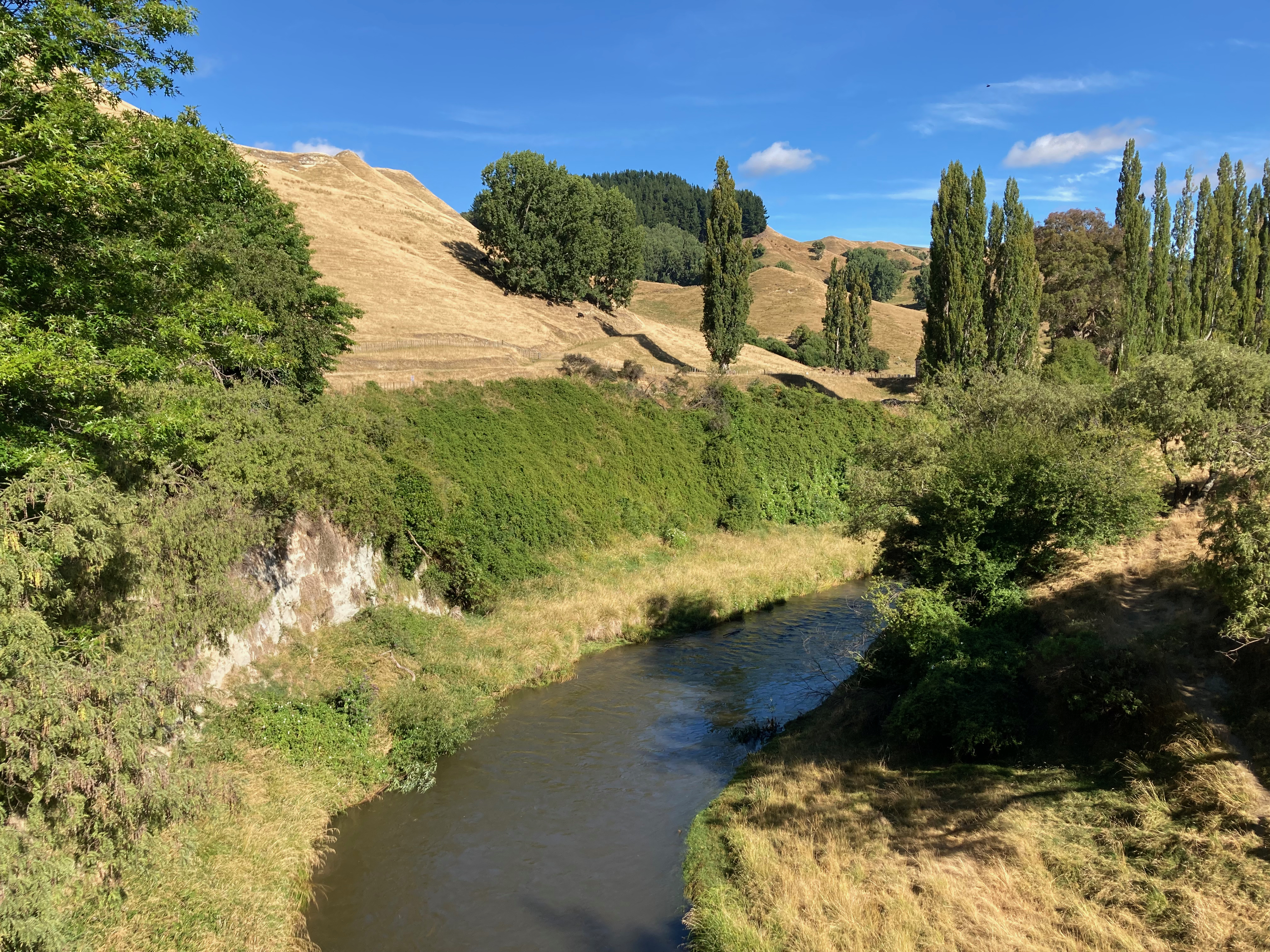
- Moawhango River at Moawhango

Location
- Country: New Zealand

Physical characteristics
- Source
  - location: Kaimanawa Range
- Mouth
  - location: Rangitikei River
- Length: 62 km (39 mi)

The Moawhango River is a tributary of the Rangitīkei River and is located the central North Island of New Zealand.

== Course ==
The river flows generally southwest from its sources in the Kaimanawa Range 35 kilometres (22 mi) east of Mount Ruapehu to reach Lake Moawhango. Lake Moawhango was formed by a dam in the New Zealand Defence Force's Waiouru Military Camp training area at the southern end of the Rangipo Desert, 10 kilometres (6 mi) north of Waiouru. The dam was constructed to divert some water from the river for the Tongariro Power Scheme, while some is released to continue down the Moawhango River. From here, the river flows southeast, passing the small settlement of Moawhango before its outflow into the Rangitikei River 8 kilometres (5 mi) southeast of Taihape. This lower section of the river flows through steep sided gorges making it difficult to access.

== Dam ==
Construction of the Moawhango River dam (known as Lake Moawhango) began in 1972 and was completed several years later. It forms part of the Tongariro Power Scheme with the water being diverted to the Rangipo power station. In 2008 complaints were made about impact of the diversion of water from the river, particularly silt build-up.

== Gallery ==
Moawhango River downstream of Lake Moawhango, January 2022

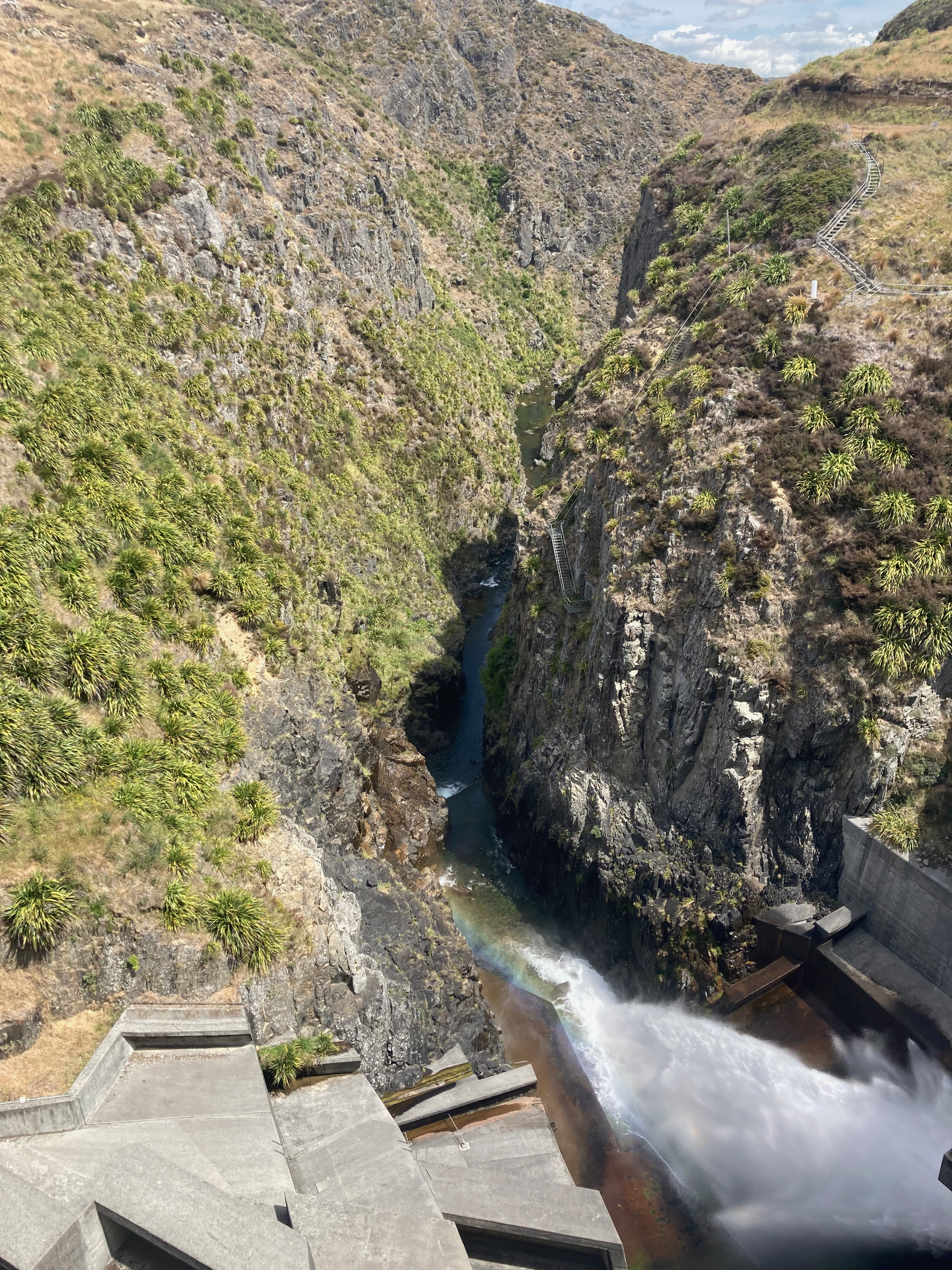
Outfall from Lake Moawhango

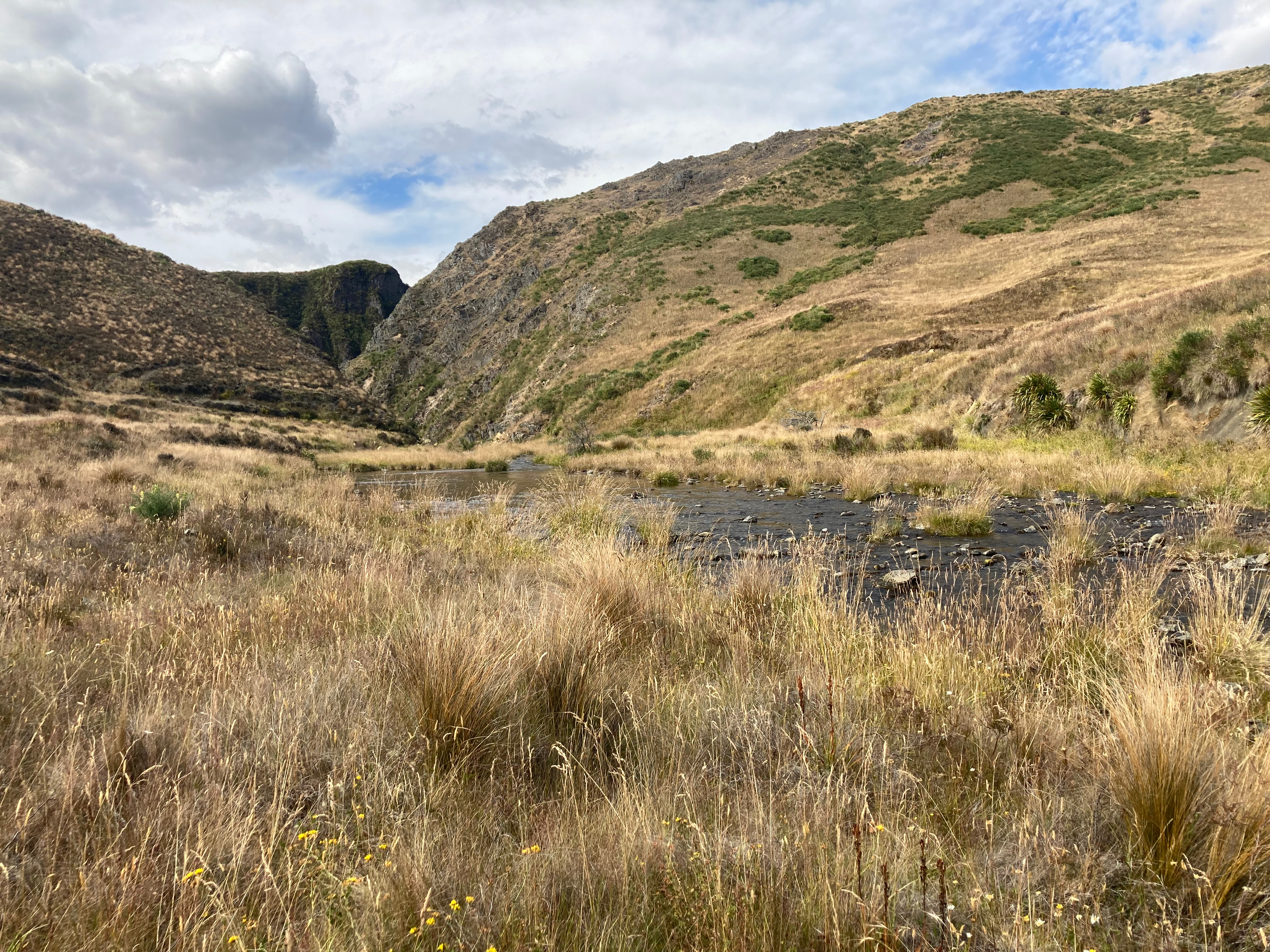
Moawhango River downstream of Lake Moawhango

== Fishing ==
The river is noted for its predominantly brown and rainbow trout.

== See also ==
- List of rivers of New Zealand
