= Ayers Island (Maine) =

Island in Penobscot County, Maine

- Location within Maine

Geography
- Coordinates: 44.8753473°N 68.6697547°W
- Area: 62 acres (25 ha)

Administration
- United States

Ayers Island is an island in the Penobscot River in Penobscot County, Maine, near the town of Orono. It was named for one of the original settlers of Orono, Joshua Ayers [Eayres], who constructed a sawmill on the island beginning around 1774.

Ayers Island is the site of the Striar Textile Mill, which closed in 1996. The land is polluted due to past manufacturing activity. The town of Orono took possession of the island in 1999. Later it was purchased by Ayers Island LLC, which announced plans to fit it with an experimental surveillance system consisting of "a comprehensive network of video cameras, motion detectors and sensors" monitored by computer.

Two episodes of the Celebrity Paranormal Project television series were recorded there.

== See also ==
- Marsh Island (Maine)
- Orono Dam
- University of Maine
