= Vicki, Kelly, and Amanda Wilson =

The Wilson Sisters
- Born: Vicki Wilson, Kelly Wilson, Amanda Wilson; New Zealand
- Occupations: Authors, coach, television producer,
- Mother: Heather Wilson

Vicki, Kelly and Amanda Wilson, generally known as The Wilson Sisters, are three New Zealanders from Northland.

== Background ==
The Wilson Sisters are known in equestrian circles for helping to tame wild Kaimanawa horses, to avoid them having to be culled when the herd exceeds sustainable management numbers. They have competed in the highest level of jumping for many years. They produced the popular Keeping up with the Kaimanawas show about their activities, which was seen by over 500,000 viewers.

== Works and other information ==
- Kelly has a pet horse called Bounce.
- Kelly Wilson has been raising money for spinal cord injuries.
