= John L. Ayers =

American politician

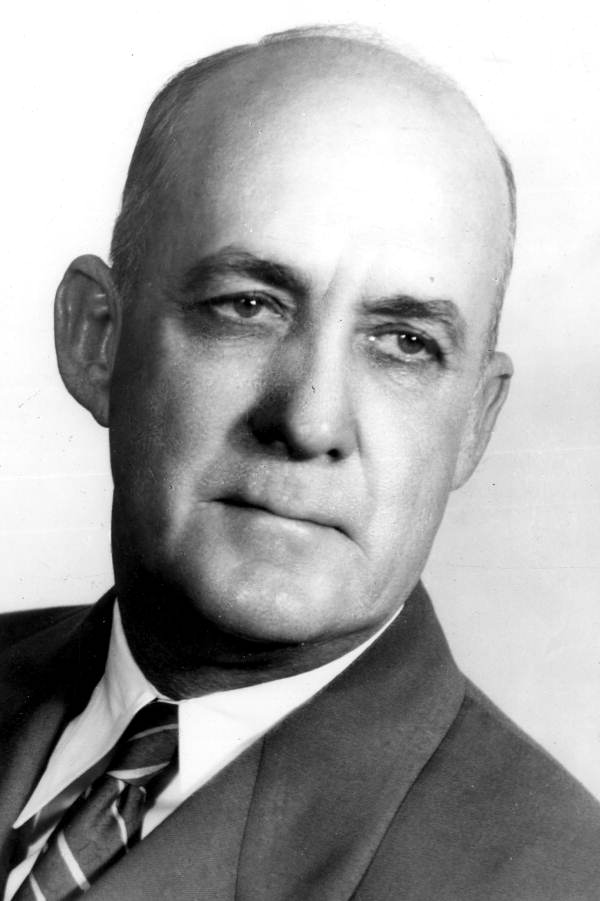
- Ayers in 1959

Member of the Florida House of Representatives from Hernando County
- In office 1957–1966

Personal details
- Born: April 8, 1902 Brooksville, Florida, U.S.
- Died: July 27, 1985 (aged 83)
- Party: Democratic

John L. Ayers (April 8, 1902 – July 27, 1985) was an American politician. He served as a Democratic member of the Florida House of Representatives.

== Life and career ==
Ayers was born in Brooksville, Florida.

Ayers starting in politics in 1932 serving on the Hernando County commission for 20 years. He served in the Florida House of Representatives from 1957 to 1966. During his time he served for 10 years as chairman of livestock committee as well as serving on the citrus committee.

Ayers died on July 27, 1985, in southern Hernando County from a heart attack, at the age of 83. He had been married to Martha Ayers in 1974 who had died two years previously in 1983.
