= Fred Ayers =

Australian rules footballer

- Ayers in 1937

Personal information
- Full name: Frederick Ayers
- Born: 8 May 1912; Clifton Hill, Victoria
- Died: 18 August 1986 (aged 74); Kew East, Victoria
- Height: 183 cm (6 ft 0 in)
- Weight: 83 kg (183 lb)

Playing career^{1}
Years	Club	Games (Goals)
1937–38	Carlton	8 (5)
- ^{1} Playing statistics correct to the end of 1938.

Frederick Ayers (8 May 1912 – 18 August 1986) was an Australian rules footballer who played with Carlton in the Victorian Football League (VFL).
