= Kaimanawa horse =

Breed of horse

Kaimanawa Horses
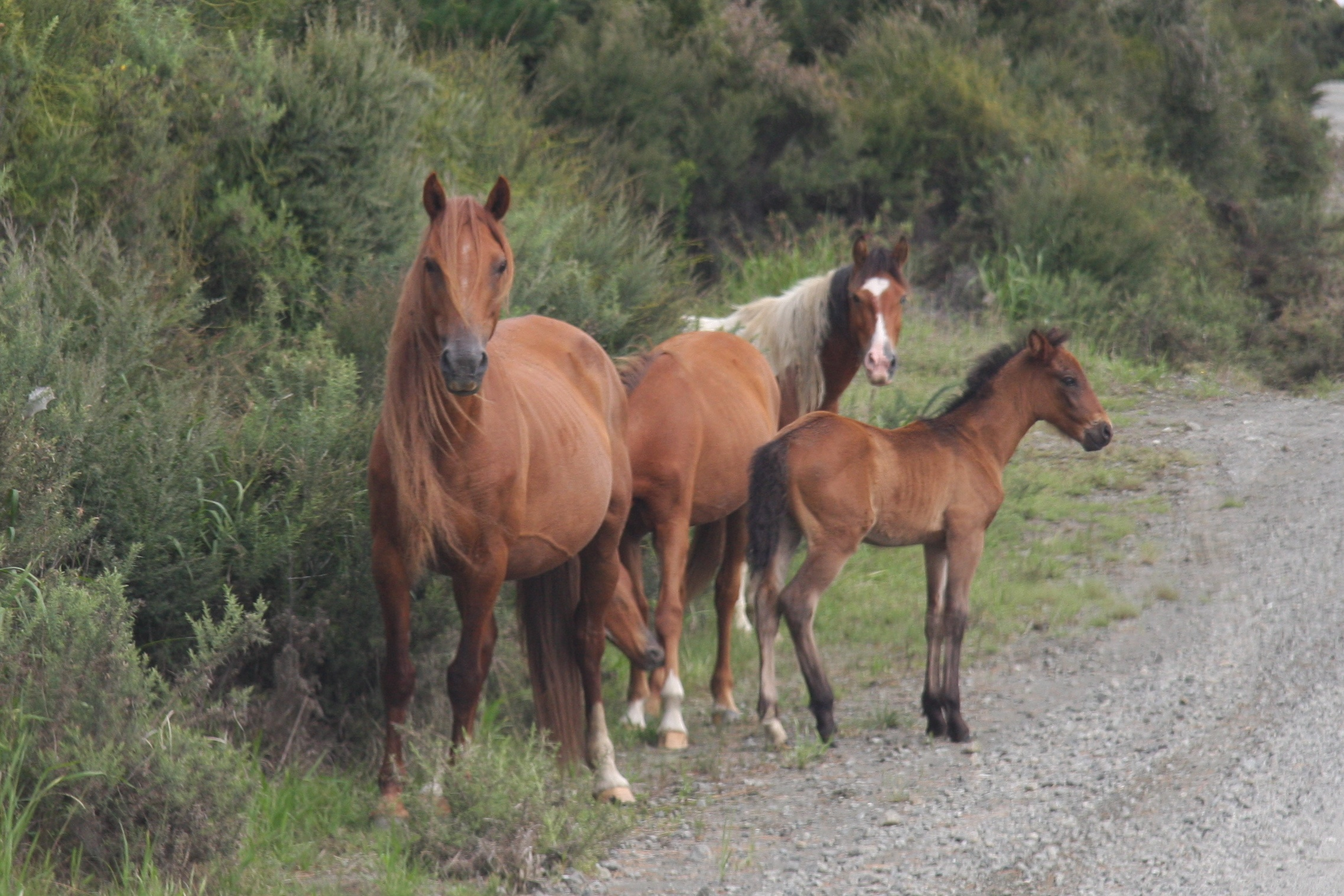
- Wild horses at Spirits Bay
- Country of origin: New Zealand

Traits
- Distinguishing features: Feral horses, wide range of body types and colours

Breed standards
- Kaimanawa Wild Horse Welfare Trust

Kaimanawa horses are a population of feral horses in New Zealand that are descended from domestic horses released in the 19th and 20th centuries. They are known for their hardiness and quiet temperament. The New Zealand government strictly controls the population to protect the habitat in which they live, which includes several endangered species of plants. The varying heritage gives the breed a wide range of heights, body patterns and colours. They are usually well-muscled, sure-footed and tough.

Horses were first reported in the Kaimanawa Range in 1876, although the first horses had been brought to New Zealand in 1814. The herds grew as horses escaped or were released from sheep stations and cavalry bases. Some of the horses were recaptured by the locals to be riding horses, as well as for their meat, hair, and hides. The number of horses declined as large-scale farms and forestry operations were built on the ranges, and there was only around 174 horses by 1979. The New Zealand government started protecting the Kaimanawa horses in 1981, and there were 1,576 horses by 1994. Roundups have been carried out annually since 1993 to manage the size of the herd, removing around 2,800 horses altogether. All suitable horses are available for rehoming after the roundups. The Kaimanawa horse population is listed as a herd of special genetic value by the United Nations' Food and Agriculture Organization, and several studies have been conducted on the herd dynamics and habits of the breed.

There is also a small unmanaged population of feral horses on the Aupōuri Peninsula at the northern tip of the North Island.

The majority of Kaimanawa horses are small but tough and sure-footed, and they are widely popular as Pony Club mounts and showjumpers. They are also popular as stock horses for high country stations.

== History ==
The first horses were introduced to New Zealand by Anglican missionary Reverend Samuel Marsden in December 1814, and wild horses were first reported in the Kaimanawa Range in 1876. The Kaimanawa breed descended from domestic horses that were released into the ranges in the late 19th century and early 20th century. Between 1858 and 1875, Major George Gwavas Carlyon imported Exmoor ponies to Hawkes Bay (not likely purebred Exmoors). They were later crossed with local horses to produce the Carlyon Pony. The Carlyon Ponies were later crossed with two Welsh Pony stallions, Kinarth Caesar and Comet, who were imported by Sir Donald McLean, and a breed known as the Comet Horse resulted. In the 1870s, McLean released a Comet stallion and several mares onto the Kaingaroa Plains and the bloodline mixed into the wild Kaimanawa Horse population. Other breeds were added to the Kaimanawa herds when riding horses escaped or were released from local sheep stations, and the cavalry units at Waiouru released horses when they were threatened with a strangles epidemic. It is also thought that in the 1960s, Nicholas Koreneff released an Arabian stallion into the Argo Valley region and the Arabian breed mixed into the Kaimanawa herds.

Throughout the 19th and 20th centuries, horses were captured from the Kaimanawa herds and used as riding and stock horses, as well as being used for their meat, hair, and hides. Originally there were many herds that roamed the land owned by the British Crown and the native Māori, but many disappeared when large scale farms and forestry operations were built on the ranges, and also farm machinery decreased the need for stock horses. The Kaimanawa horses today have the most genetic similarity with Thoroughbred horses and Thoroughbred cross breeds.

Land development and an increasing human population reduced the number of the Kaimanawa horses and the space they had to roam, and in 1979 only around 174 horses remained. In 1981, the Kaimanawa horse population, the size of the ranges, and the herd movements began to be officially measured. A protected area was formed in the Waiouru Army Camp for the Kaimanawa herds to live. Legislative protection of the Kaimanawa horses was similar to that of the kiwi and other native species. There was a rapid increase in the herd size following the protection of the breed, and 1,576 horses were living in the area by 1994.

There is also a small population of feral horses living on the Aupōuri Peninsula at the northern tip of the North Island. These horses live on the land owned by local Māori and are mostly unmanaged by the New Zealand government.

The Wilson Sisters from Whangārei, New Zealand made the Kaimanawa horses a household name in New Zealand so that after the 2016 muster there were enough homes for all the suitable horses to be rehomed. Kelly Wilson has published seven bestselling books about the Kaimanawa Horses. For the Love of Horses is about their childhood and becoming New Zealand's best showjumping riders and the first time they tamed wild Kaimanawas, Stallion Challenges is about the year they tamed wild two Kaimanawa stallions each to compete in the Stallion Challenge competition, Mustang Ride is about the sisters taming wild mustangs in America to compete in the Mustang Makeover, Saving the Snowy Brumbies is about the sisters taming wild brumby horses from Australia, Ranger the Kaimanawa Stallion is told by a Kaimanawa stallion called Ranger who was tamed by the sisters, and the Showtym Adventures series is a junior fiction series about the sisters' favorite ponies from their childhood.

Several other books have been published about the wild Kaimanawa horses. In 2008, Dianne Haworth published a novel called Kaimanawa Princess that was inspired by 13-year-old Rochelle Purcell and her pony Kaimanawa Princess who campaigned to save the wild Kaimanawa horses in 1996. In the book, a girl rehomes a wild Kaimanawa horse and her foal and tames them while fighting to stop the government culling the wild Kaimanawa horses. In 2018, Marion Day published a novel called Blue Cloud about the life of a wild horse and a girl who dreams of having her own horse and how they come together.

== Breed characteristics ==
Many characteristics of the Comet Horses are shown in the Kaimanawa horses today, although the varied gene input has produced a wide range of sizes, colours, and body types among the wild horses. The Kaimanawa breed varies widely in general appearance, with heights ranging between 12.2 and 15 hands (50 and 60 inches, 127 and 152 cm) high. Any coat colour or pattern is acceptable. Their feral way of life has given them the ability to adapt quickly and live on very little, and they are usually sure-footed and tough. They have a medium-sized head in good proportion to their body, with wide variation in shape due to the different conformation of their ancestors. Kaimanawa horses have a short deep neck with a thick throat area, straight shoulders, a deep girth, and a short to medium back. The hindquarters vary from sloping to well-rounded. The legs are long and well-muscled, with strong hooves, and hind hooves that are generally smaller than the front hooves. All horses in the Southern Hemisphere, including Kaimanawa horses, are considered to age a year on the first of August, regardless of their actual foaling date.

== Population control and study ==
Owing to the increase in population after protective legislation was put into place, the Department of Conservation developed a management plan for the Kaimanawa herd in 1989 and 1990. A draft plan was made available to the public for comment in 1991, and the public made it clear that it objected to herd reduction through shooting from helicopters, and instead favoured the horses remaining alive after being removed from the herd. However, core animal welfare groups felt that shooting was the most humane option. Trial musters were conducted in 1993, 1994 and 1995, and were successful, although costly and with a limited demand for the captured horses.

In 1994, a working party was established to look at the management of the Kaimanawa herd. They aimed to decide which organization was in charge of long term management, to ensure that the treatment of horses is humane, to preserve and control the best attributes of the herds, and to eliminate the impacts of the herds on other conservation priorities. Goals included ensuring the welfare of the horses, protecting natural ecosystems and features that the Kaimanawa herd may impact and keeping the herd at a sustainable level. Ecological objectives included ensuring that Kaimanawa horse does not adversely affect endangered, rare and biogeographically significant plants; ensuring that the herd does not further degrade the ecosystems in which it lives; and preventing the herd from spreading into the Kaimanawa Forest Park and the Tongariro National Park. Herd objectives included ensuring that the public was safe from roaming horses, while still allowing and improving public access to the herd and ensuring humane treatment of the horses; reducing conflict between the herd and other ecological values and land uses; and ensuring that the herd is contained to a population that is tolerated by the ecosystems in which they live while still maintaining a minimum effective population that is in general free ranging.

The Department of Conservation has since 1993 carried out annual culls and muster of Kaimanawas to keep the herd population around a target level of 500 horses. The target was reduced to 300 horses starting in 2009. These horses are either taken directly to slaughter or are placed at holding farms for later slaughter or adoption by private homes. A main reason for the strict population control is to protect the habitat in which they live. This habitat includes 16 plant species listed as endangered, which the Kaimanawa may endanger further through trampling and overgrazing. These plants include herbs, grasses, sedges, flowers and mistletoes; among these are Deschampsia caespitosa (a very rare tussock grass), Peraxilla tetrapetala (a vulnerable mistletoe) and Libertia peregrinans (a possibly locally extinct sand iris). The 2009 culling of the population removed 230 horses from the herd, the largest culling since the beginning of the program, with homes found for 85% of the horses removed. Conservation of these horses is an important matter to the public, and between 1990 and 2003 the New Zealand Minister for Conservation received more public comments on the Kaimanawa horse than on any other subject. In this period, more than 1,400 requests for information and letters were received, with public interest peaking in 1996 and 1997. This was due to a program of population reduction by shooting scheduled to begin implementation in 1996; due to public opposition the shooting was cancelled and a large scale muster and adoption program began in 1997. In 1997, around 1,069 horses were removed from the range and adopted, reducing the main herd to around 500, and reducing their range to around 25,000 ha from around 70,000. Since 1993, a total of around 2,800 horses have been removed from the range. Only one injury resulting in the death of a horse is known to have occurred.

The United Nations' Food and Agriculture Organization lists the Kaimanawa horses as a herd of special genetic value that can be compared with other groups of feral horses such as New Forest ponies, Assateague ponies, wild Mustangs, and with free-living zebras. Kaimanawas are of special value because of their low rate of interaction with humans. This lack of interaction may result in a herd with more wild and fewer domestic characteristics, which is of special interest to researchers. Between 1994 and 1997, students from Massey University studied a population of around 400 Kaimanawa horses to learn their habits and herd dynamics. A 2000 study found that although sometimes there are more than two stallions in Kaimanawa horse herds, only the two stallions highest in the herd hierarchy mate with the herd females. This differs from other feral horse herds, some of which have only one stallion that mates with mares, while others have several stallions that sire foals.

== See also ==
- Chincoteague pony – American horse breed
- Sable Island horse – Canadian breed of horse
