= Stout Creek =

River in Michigan, United States

Coordinates: 43°03′37″N 85°31′46″W

Stout Creek is a stream located in central Cannon Township of Kent County in the U.S. state of Michigan.

This water source is named for the frontier family of Andrew Stout, 1850s founder of the Kent County lumber town of Plainfield at the Rogue and Grand Rivers intersection. Stout Creek sources deep in an oak, maple and white pine woodland and winds its way Southwesterly through ancient dunes and spring beds. The waterway is joined by Schutte's Creek before eventually emptying into Trout Creek, (sometimes known as "Kaiser's Creek"), which in turn joins Bear Creek on its southwesterly flow to the Grand River.

This medium-sized brook is said to have once served as a water source for a small Native American settlement reported to have nestled upon a nearby sandy slope. In the late 19th century and early 20th century Stout Creek bordered potato fields which were later turned back to marshland. In addition it served to water the cattle and horses of a nearby hamlet inhabited by Seventh-day Adventists.

The black-mud springbeds and loamish hillsides of the Stout Creek Valley are host to a number of woodland plants enjoyed by nature lovers. Among this flora are found the following; marsh marigold, skunk cabbage, scour grass, partridge berry, wintergreen, elderberry, wild ginseng, wild ginger, bloodroot, blue violet, white violet, yellow violet, hypatica, Turk's cap, columbine, christmas fern, fiddle head fern, snowberry, sassafras, thorn apple and a host of others.

The Stout Creek valley holds the charm of several legends known to locals. There is the story of the nearby Pow Wow Hill, where natives once gathered around a hilltop fire pit. The marshland is said to hide a quicksand pit to which an early 20th-century farmer once lost a horse. Nearby dunes once concealed a liquor still in the age of prohibition and, in the early 1970s, locals enjoyed combing a sandpit said to hold a treasure of arrowheads. Stout Creek Valley can be accessed by Seven Mile Road NE, and has become part of a wooded bedroom community serving Northeast Grand Rapids.
