= Lake Moawhango =

Small artificial lake in New Zealand

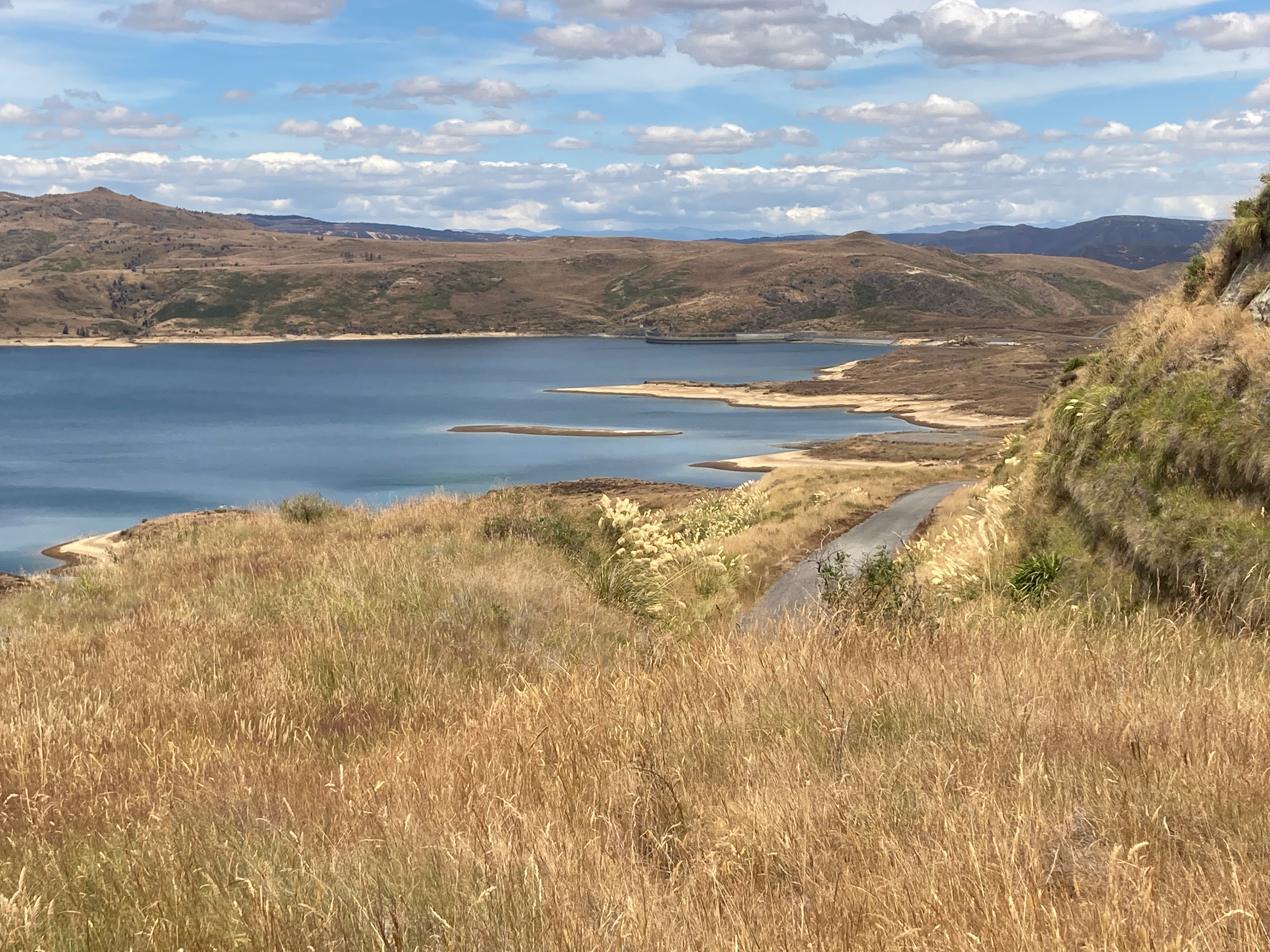
- Lake Moawhango looking south towards Moawhango Dam, January 2022

- Location within North Island
- Location: Waiouru, North Island
- Coordinates: 39.393°S 175.753°E
- Primary outflows: Moawhango Tunnel to Tongariro River
- Basin countries: New Zealand

Lake Moawhango is a small artificial lake located with the New Zealand Army's Waiouru Military Camp. It is fed by the Mangaio Stream, boosted by tributaries diverted from the slopes of Mount Ruapehu, and by the Moawhango River. Water is taken from the lake for the Tongariro Power Scheme, feeding the Tongariro River via the Moawhango Tunnel, although some water is released to continue down the Moawhango River nearby the settlement of Moawhango. The lake is dammed at the southern end.

Lake Moawhango contains a large population of wild rainbow trout, and while these are easily caught, they very rarely exceed 2 pounds (0.9 kg) in weight. The lake contains three islands, the largest of which is known as Ayers Rock.

The exact antipodes of this lake coincide exactly with the dam of Torre de Abraham, in Castilla - La Mancha, Spain (at coordinates 39°22′06″N 4°15′12″W).

The New Zealand government is exploring using the lake for a pumped-storage hydroelectricity as an alternative to Lake Onslow.

== Gallery ==
Lake Moawhango

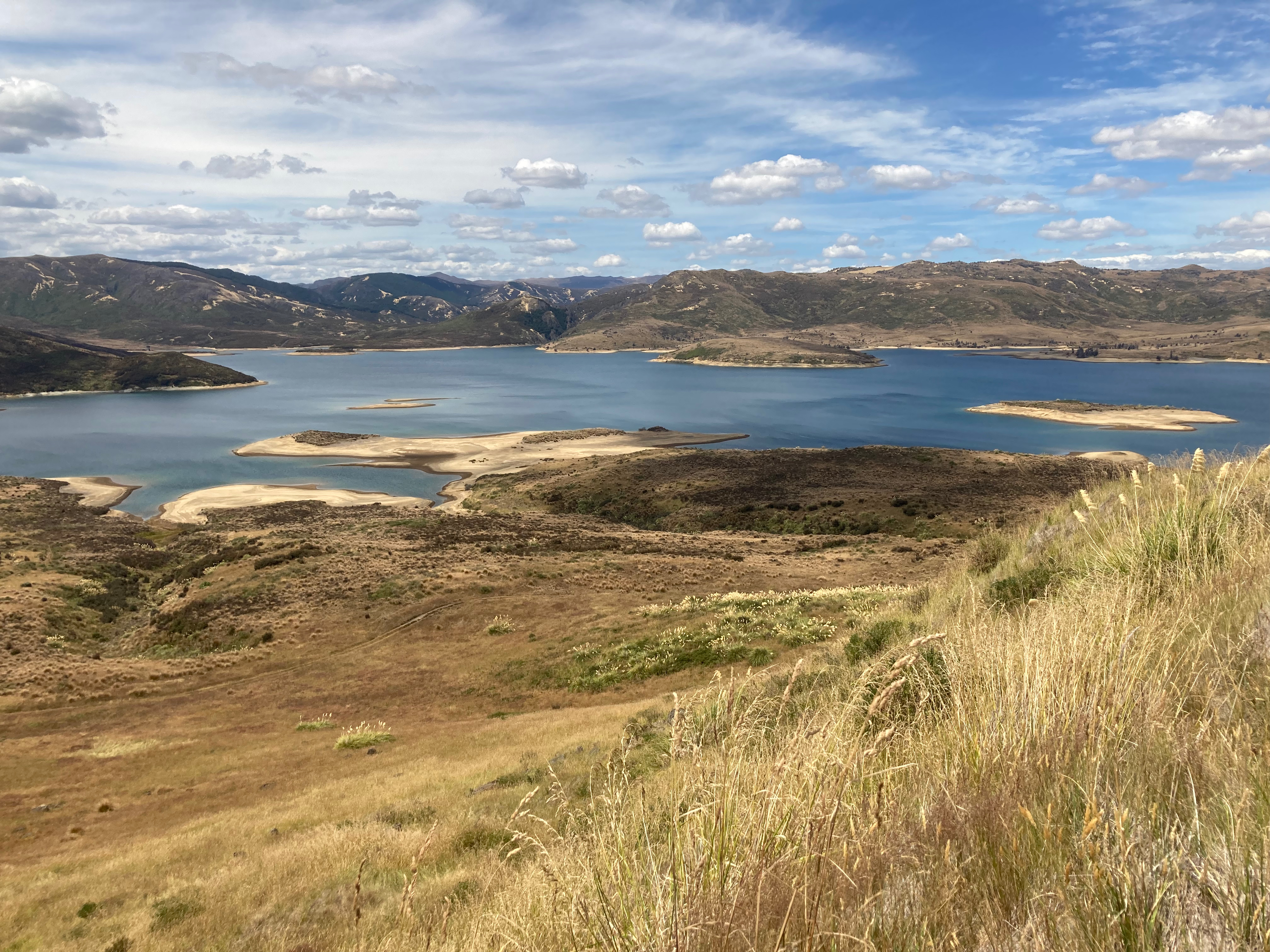
Lake Moawhango from west side looking east, January 2022

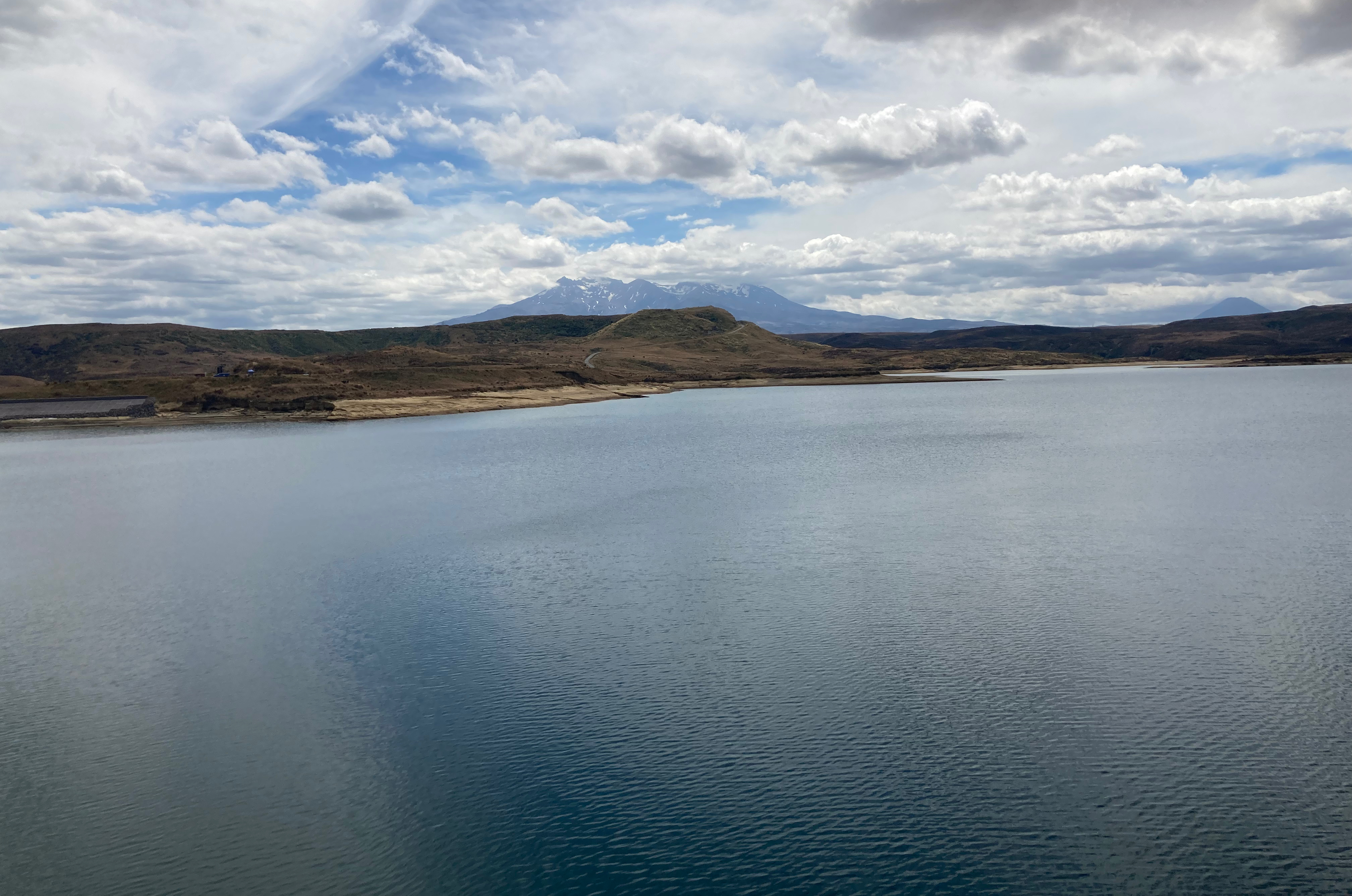
Lake Moawhango looking north west to Mt Ruapehu, January 2022

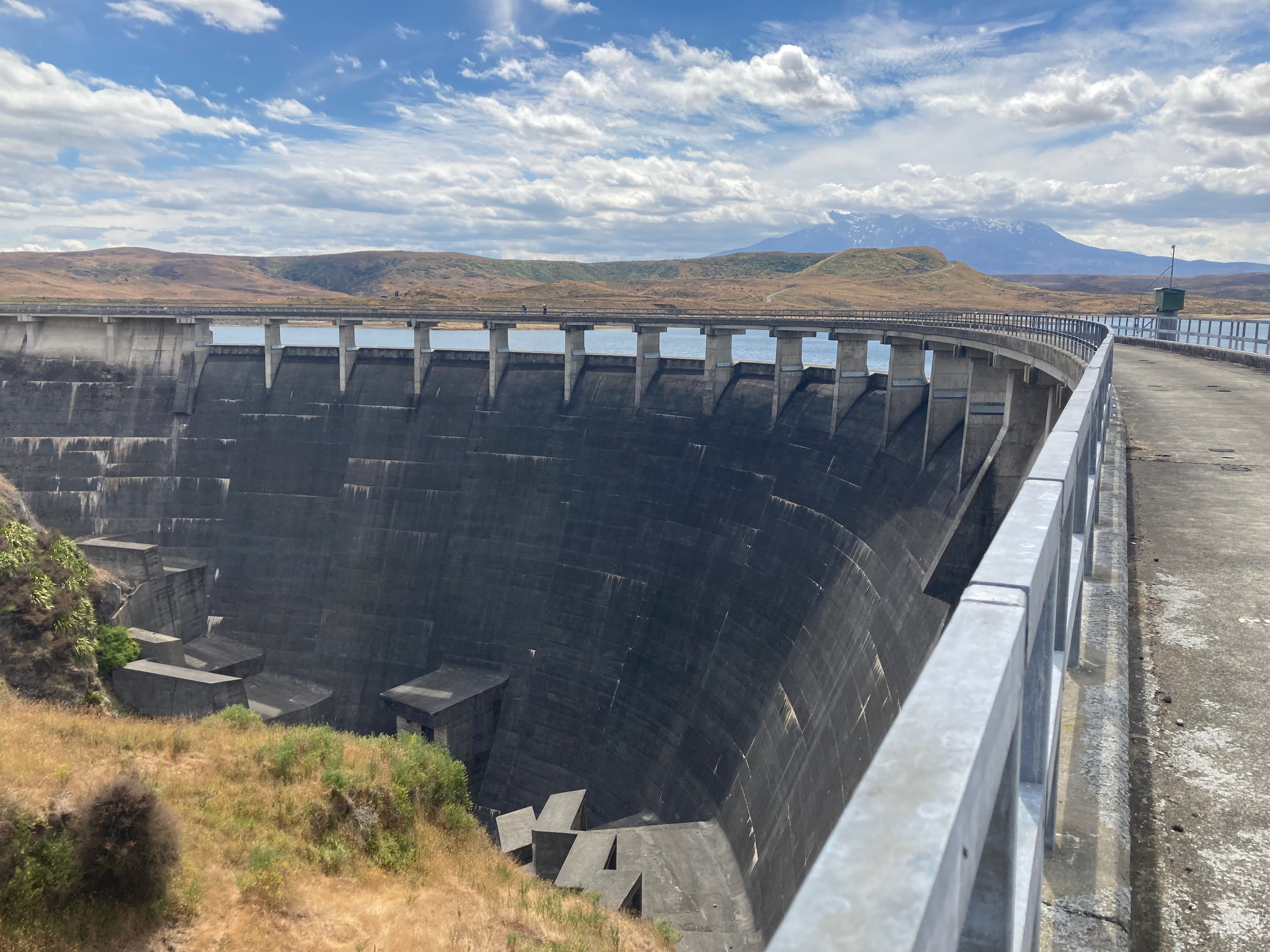
Lake Moawhango and Mt Ruapehu from the Moawhango Dam, January 2022
