= Kaimanawa Range =

Mountain range in New Zealand

Coordinates: 39.223°S 175.921°E

Kaimanawa Mountains
- Kaimanawa Range
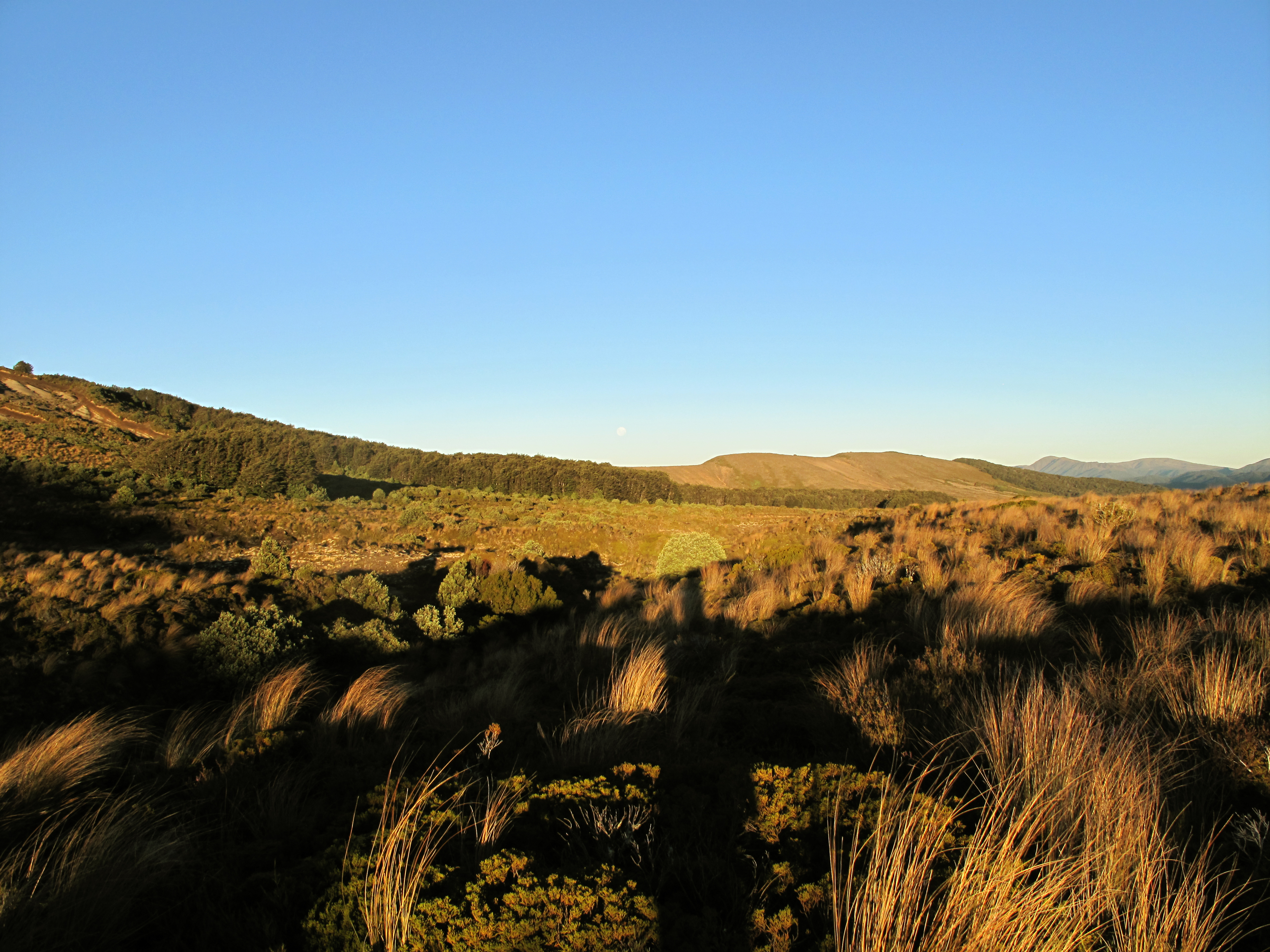
- Sunset in the Kaimanawa Range

Highest point
- Elevation: 1,727 m (5,666 ft)

Geography
- Location within New Zealand

The Kaimanawa Range, officially called the Kaimanawa Mountains since 16 July 2020, is a range of mountains in the central North Island of New Zealand. They extend for 50 kilometres in a northeast–southwest direction through largely uninhabited country to the south of Lake Taupō, east of the "Desert Road". Their slopes form part of the North Island Volcanic Plateau.

The New Zealand Ministry for Culture and Heritage gives a translation of "breath for food" for Kaimanawa.

The lands around the mountains are scrubby. To the west, where the Rangipo Desert is located, the soils are poor quality. To the east, the soils are more fertile, but the land is very rough. A population of feral horses, the Kaimanawa horses, roam free on the ranges.

Unlike the majority of mountain ranges in New Zealand, the Kaimanawa Range is divided into private land. Considerable areas of the Rangipo Desert are used by the New Zealand Army for training.

== Demographics ==
Kaimanawa covers 1,342.26 km^{2} (518.25 sq mi) and had an estimated population of 310 as of June 2025, with a population density of 0.23 people per km^{2}.

Historical population
Year	Pop.	±% p.a.
2006	57	—
2013	6	−27.50%
2018	180	+97.44%
2023	312	+11.63%

Kaimanawa had a population of 312 in the 2023 New Zealand census, an increase of 132 people (73.3%) since the 2018 census, and an increase of 306 people (5100.0%) since the 2013 census. There were 303 males and 9 females in 9 dwellings. 5.8% of people identified as LGBTIQ+. The median age was 48.3 years (compared with 38.1 years nationally). There were 33 people (10.6%) aged 15 to 29, 240 (76.9%) aged 30 to 64, and 42 (13.5%) aged 65 or older.

People could identify as more than one ethnicity. The results were 53.8% European (Pākehā), 57.7% Māori, 5.8% Pasifika, 4.8% Asian, and 2.9% other, which includes people giving their ethnicity as "New Zealander". English was spoken by 98.1%, Māori by 19.2%, Samoan by 1.0%, and other languages by 3.8%. New Zealand Sign Language was known by 1.9%. The percentage of people born overseas was 8.7, compared with 28.8% nationally.

Religious affiliations were 34.6% Christian, 1.0% Hindu, 7.7% Māori religious beliefs, 1.0% Buddhist, 1.0% New Age, and 3.8% other religions. People who answered that they had no religion were 49.0%, and 3.8% of people did not answer the census question.

Of those at least 15 years old, 18 (5.8%) people had a bachelor's or higher degree, 183 (58.7%) had a post-high school certificate or diploma, and 111 (35.6%) people exclusively held high school qualifications. 3 people (1.0%) earned over $100,000 compared to 12.1% nationally. The employment status of those at least 15 was 15 (4.8%) full-time, 39 (12.5%) part-time, and 15 (4.8%) unemployed.

== Kaimanawa Wall ==
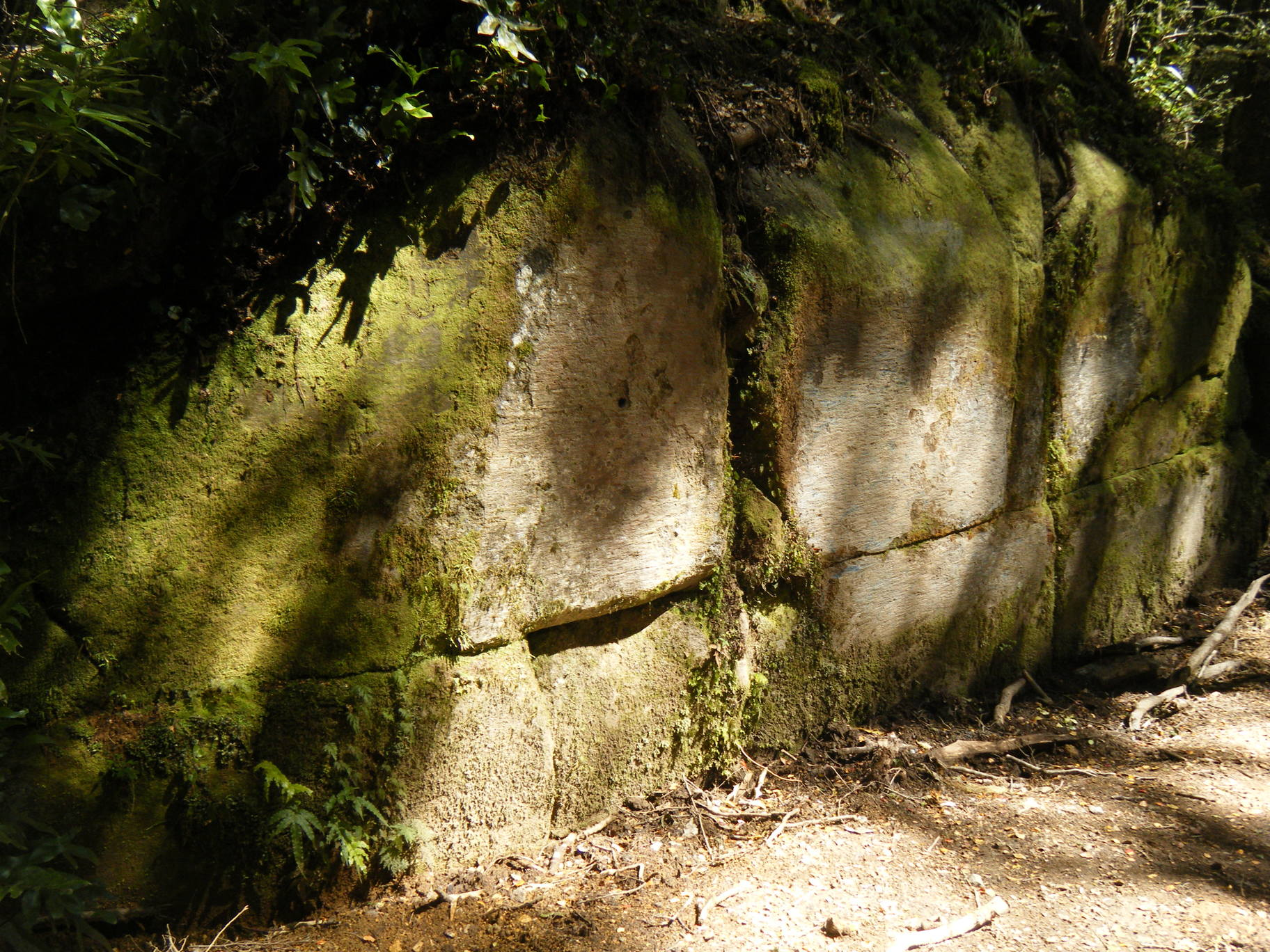
Kaimanawa wall

The Kaimanawa Wall is a geological feature in the Kaimanawa State Forest. The Tūwharetoa tangata whenua (people) claim an "oral tradition" of the place as a kōhatu (rock). A popular theory states that the wall is a pre-Māori civilization artifact.

The wall formation was inspected by an archaeologist and a geologist; neither saw evidence of a human origin. In a preliminary investigation, archaeologist Neville Ritchie of the New Zealand Department of Conservation observed "matching micro-irregularities along the joints." This indicated that the blocks in the wall were too perfectly matched. He also observed the joints were neither straight nor truly horizontal nor perpendicular, indicating the joint alignments were too poorly constructed. Ritchie concluded the blocks are a natural formation based on the presence of matching micro-irregularities in blocks and imperfect joint alignment.

Peter Wood, a geologist of the Institute of Geological and Nuclear Sciences at Wairakei, inspected the blocks for an afternoon and concluded they are natural fractures in "jointed Rangitaiki ignimbrite, a 330,000 year old volcanic rock that is common in the Taupō Volcanic Zone." Both vertical and horizontal joints are common. Fractures in the Rangitaiki ignimbrite formed when it cooled and contracted after flowing into place during an eruption.
