= Upokongaro =

Settlement upriver from Whanganui, New Zealand

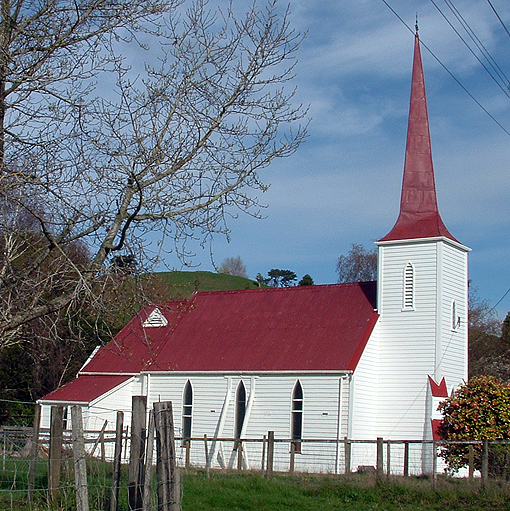
- St Mary's Anglican Church. In 1885, Alfred Burton noted: "Upokongaro boasts a church with a three-sided spire something like a bayonet."
- Interactive map of Upokongaro
- Coordinates: 39°52′S 175°08′E
- Country: New Zealand
- Region: Manawatū-Whanganui
- District: Whanganui District
- Community: Whanganui Rural Community
- Electorates: Whanganui; Te Tai Hauāuru (Māori)

Government
  - Territorial Authority: Whanganui District Council
  - Regional council: Horizons Regional Council
  - Mayor of Whanganui: Andrew Tripe
  - Whanganui MP: Carl Bates
  - Te Tai Hauāuru MP: Debbie Ngarewa-Packer

Area
  - Total: 25.04 km^{2} (9.67 sq mi)

Population (2023 Census)
  - Total: 120
  - Density: 4.8/km^{2} (12/sq mi)
- Time zone: UTC+12 (NZST)
  - Summer (DST): UTC+13 (NZDT)
- Area code: 06

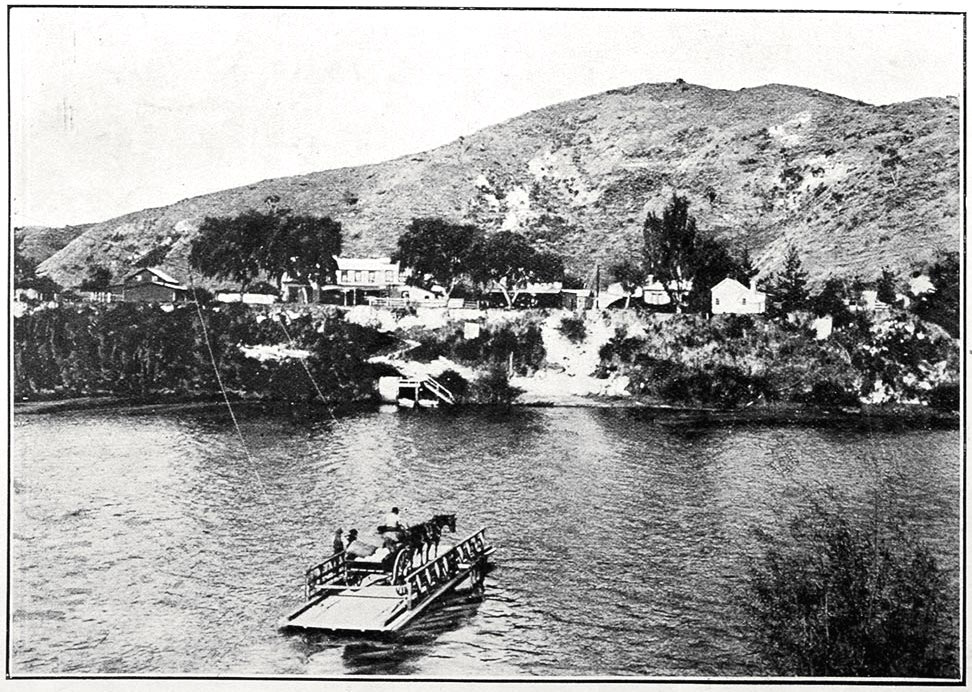
A punt crossing the Whanganui River at Upokongaro in 1908, pulled across on a wire. The punt operated until 1935.

Upokongaro or Ūpokongaro is a settlement adjacent to the Whanganui River, located 12 kilometres (7.5 mi) upriver from Whanganui, New Zealand, in the Makirikiri Valley. Settled by Europeans in the 1860s, it was an important ferry crossing and riverboat stop. A spectacular discovery of moa bones was made in the area in the 1930s.

== Māori history ==
The village's name in Māori, ūpoko (head) ngaro (hidden), refers to a story of how chief's daughter Ira-nga-rangi arranged to have her head removed upon her death and hidden by relatives, who feared it might be desecrated by enemies. Supposedly the preserved head was hidden in a cave on the banks of the Ūpokongaro Stream north of the settlement, from which the village takes its name.

At the time of European contact, both Ūpokongaro and adjacent settlements Waipakura and Kukuta were home to the Ngāti Patutokotoko hapū of the iwi Te Āti Haunui-a-Pāpārangi. Ngāti Iringirangi and Nga Paerangi are also noted as being present. The fortified hilltop pā at Ūpokongaro was called Opiu; during the tense times of the 1840s, Opiu was pulled down and abandoned.

Waipakura, south of Ūpokongaro, was one of a number of native reserves set aside in the 1848 Deed of Sale; some of it was leased to settlers in the 1860s. Ūpokongaro was described as a "small pā" in 1865, and Māori settlement persisted until at least the 1880s. The pā site at Opiu was used as a refuge for settlers' wives and children in 1862, when there were fears of Hau Hau war parties, and was later turned into a redoubt.

== European settlement ==
In 1866, settler John Kennedy built a hotel and a store (later the post office); during the 1870s and '80s, the local name for Ūpokongaro was "Kennedy's". A school was built in 1870, known from 1873–1879 as the North Makirikiri or "River Bank" school.

The schoolroom functioned for Anglican services in the mid 1870s, but in 1877 St Mary's Anglican Church was built. Designed by local architect Edward Morgan and built by John Randal, St Mary's is distinctive in having a spire with a triangular cross-section, on a four-sided steeple. Its stained glass window was installed in 1879, in memory of Archibald Montgomery, a young Upokongaro man lost in the sinking of the clipper Avalanche in the English Channel just before the church was completed. St Mary's is the oldest church in the Whanganui District on its original site.

== Moa discovery ==
In the 1930s, thousands of moa bones were recovered from mud springs in the Upokongaro Valley at Makirikiri by a Whanganui Museum expedition. Life-sized concrete moa sculptures commemorating this can be seen on the main road outside the Upokongaro Cafe.

== Demographics ==
Upokongaro locality covers 25.94 km^{2} (10.02 sq mi). It is part of the larger Upper Whanganui statistical area.

Historical population
Year	Pop.	±% p.a.
2013	102	—
2018	105	+0.58%
2023	120	+2.71%

Upokongaro had a population of 120 in the 2023 New Zealand census, an increase of 15 people (14.3%) since the 2018 census, and an increase of 18 people (17.6%) since the 2013 census. There were 66 males and 54 females in 45 dwellings. 2.5% of people identified as LGBTIQ+. The median age was 53.1 years (compared with 38.1 years nationally). There were 15 people (12.5%) aged under 15 years, 21 (17.5%) aged 15 to 29, 54 (45.0%) aged 30 to 64, and 27 (22.5%) aged 65 or older.

People could identify as more than one ethnicity. The results were 87.5% European (Pākehā), 32.5% Māori, and 2.5% Pasifika. English was spoken by 97.5%, Māori by 7.5%, and other languages by 2.5%. No language could be spoken by 2.5% (e.g. too young to talk). New Zealand Sign Language was known by 2.5%. The percentage of people born overseas was 5.0, compared with 28.8% nationally.

Religious affiliations were 30.0% Christian, and 5.0% Māori religious beliefs. People who answered that they had no religion were 52.5%, and 12.5% of people did not answer the census question.

Of those at least 15 years old, 9 (8.6%) people had a bachelor's or higher degree, 57 (54.3%) had a post-high school certificate or diploma, and 39 (37.1%) people exclusively held high school qualifications. The median income was $28,400, compared with $41,500 nationally. The employment status of those at least 15 was 54 (51.4%) full-time, 15 (14.3%) part-time, and 3 (2.9%) unemployed.

== Education ==
Upokongaro School is a co-educational state primary school for Year 1 to 8 students, with a roll of 91 as of July 2026. It opened in 1870.

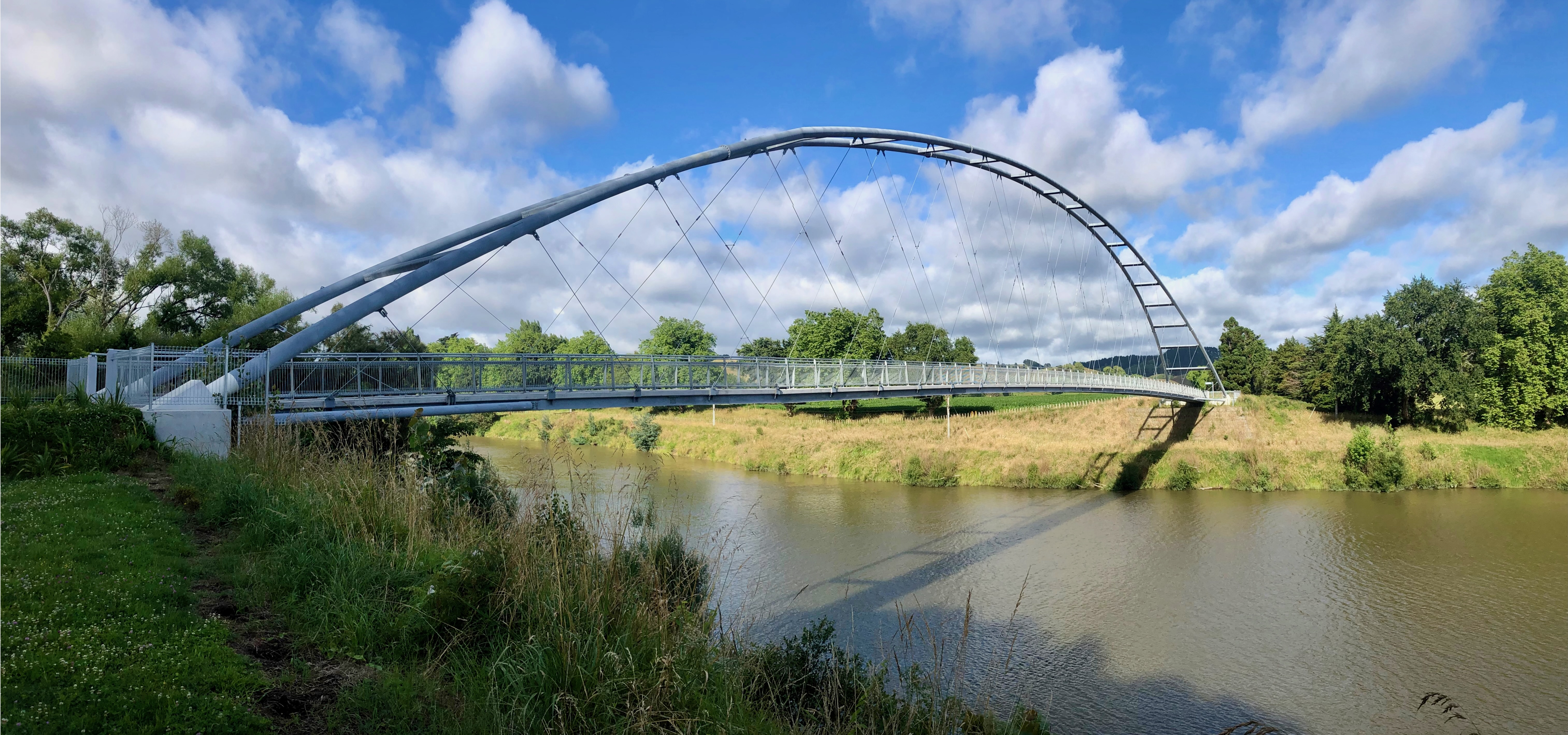
Ūpokongaro cycle bridge

== Cycle trail ==
Ūpokongaro is on the Mountains to Sea cycle trail (Ngā Ara Tūhono), at the junction of the 67 km (42 mi) Whanganui River Road and 19 km (12 mi) Ūpokongaro to the Tasman Sea sections. The sections are linked by Ūpokongaro Cycle Bridge, which opened on 2 December 2020. The 130 m (430 ft) long bridge and cycle path link to it cost $3.4m.

== Nankeen night heron ==
The Nankeen night heron is rare in New Zealand, but a population has established along the Whanganui River. This is the only place in New Zealand where they are known to be resident. The first confirmed breeding of Nankeen night herons in the Whanganui area was observed at Pipiriki in February 1994. Night herons have been observed in trees behind a cafe in Upokongaro, and nested there in 2023, attracting the interest of bird watchers and photographers, and leading to the publication of a book about the bird.
