= PS Waimarie =

Paddle steamer in New Zealand

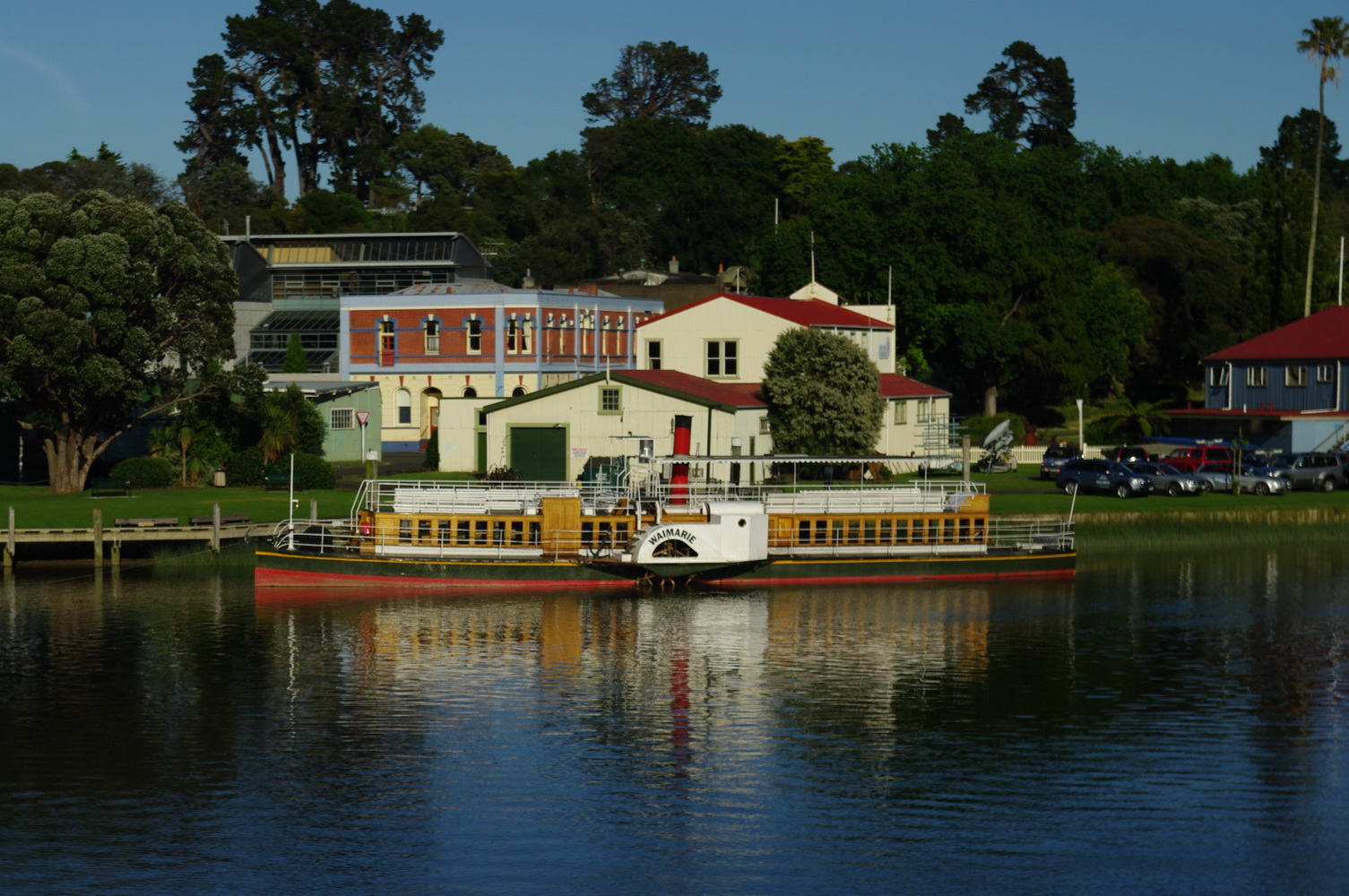
- PS Waimarie at Whanganui Riverboat Centre

History

New Zealand
- Name: PS Aotea (1899–1902); PS Waimarie (Since 1902)
- Owner: Whanganui Riverboat Restoration and Navigation Trust
- Operator: Waimarie Operating Trust
- Route: Whanganui River, New Zealand
- Builder: Yarrow & Co. (in Poplar, London)
- Launched: 1899
- In service: 20 July 1900
- Out of service: 1949—2000
- Refit: 1993—1999
- Status: Operational

General characteristics
- Class & type: Paddle steamer; Tourist vessel
- Tonnage: 80 GT
- Length: 30.5 m (100.2 ft)
- Beam: 4.9 m (16 ft), 6.7 m (22 ft) over paddle housings
- Draft: 0.36 metres (14 in)
- Installed power: Coal-fired water tube boiler with two single-cylinder steam engines
- Propulsion: Side paddle wheels
- Speed: 10.5 kn (19.4 km/h; 12.1 mph)
- Capacity: 110 passengers
- Crew: 6

The Paddle Steamer Waimarie is a historic riverboat based on the Whanganui River in New Zealand. She is the only coal–fired paddle steamer still operating in New Zealand. Waimarie was built in 1899 by Yarrow & Co. in London and transported to New Zealand in kitset form to be assembled at Whanganui. She operated on the Whanganui River for 49 years before being laid up. In 1952 she sank at her moorings and lay in the mud for the next 40 years.

However, in 1993 Waimarie was raised from the riverbed, and a six year restoration effort led to her return to service in 2000. PS Waimarie is now a popular tourist attraction in Whanganui, with 2 hour cruises on the river available most days during the summer season.

== History ==
This paddle steamer was ordered by the Wanganui Settlers' River Steamship Co, and built as a kitset by Yarrow shipbuilders in London in 1899. She was shipped to Wanganui in 64 crates plus the boiler, and was assembled by David Murray & Co in March 1900. On 29 June, she took a party of about 100 people 61 kilometres (38 mi) upstream to a meeting at Koriniti on a trial run, and commenced regular services to Pipiriki three weeks later. For the first two years, she was named PS Aotea.

The company operating the new vessel was in competition with existing passenger, mail and cargo services on the river operated by Alexander Hatrick, who at that time was Mayor of Wanganui. Hatrick had a well-established business on the river, and had been carrying large numbers of passengers to Pipiriki, on a tourist route promoted as "The Rhine of Maoriland" into the interior of New Zealand. The Wanganui Settlers' River Steamship Co could not sustain the competition and Hatrick's company purchased the Aotea in 1902. She was then renamed PS Waimarie, a Māori-language word meaning "peaceful waters".

The Waimarie operated a regular service on the 88 kilometres (55 mi) route between Wanganui and Pipiriki for 49 years, carrying cargo, mail and passengers. The opening of the Whanganui River Road in 1935 reduced the demand for river transport, and the Waimarie, needing her boiler replaced, ceased running in 1949. In 1952, she sank at her moorings in Wanganui.

== Restoration ==
On 14 February 1990, a public meeting was held with 90 people attending, to promote the salvage and restoration of PS Waimarie. The Whanganui Riverboat Restoration and Navigation Trust was incorporated in July 1991 to plan and undertake the project. An important initial step was securing the use of the near-derelict Wanganui Rowing Club building as a workshop where the vessel could be restored. The Rowing Club building was renovated to serve initially as a workshop, and then as a museum facility. It was renamed as the Whanganui Riverboat Centre, and re-opened on 24 February 1995.

After being buried in the river mud for nearly 40 years, the Waimarie was salvaged by volunteers in 1993. The restoration of the vessel was adopted as a sesquicentennial project in Whanganui. After a six-year restoration project, the PS Waimarie was re-commissioned, and commenced tourist cruises on 1 January 2000. She is the only coal–fired paddle steamer still operating in New Zealand.

== Tourist vessel service ==
In the first year following re-commissioning she carried over 25,000 passengers.

PS Waimarie is owned by the Whanganui Riverboat Restoration and Navigation Trust. In 2003, a separate organisation, the Waimarie Operating Trust was formed to manage vessel operations.

PS Waimarie has been described as Whanganui's main tourist attraction. She typically carries more than 8,000 passengers each year, with a maximum of 90 per trip. During the summer season she operates on the lower stretches of the river, and is also available for charter. The typical daily cruise is a 13 kilometres (8.1 mi) trip upriver to Upokongaro and return.

The operation of the vessel is undertaken by 8 staff and 12 volunteers. In 2020, it was reported that the operation of the vessel had been supported for several years with annual funding of $65,000 from a Community Contract.

PS Waimarie is hauled out of the river every 5 years for survey, on a site near to the Dublin Street bridge. The haulage operation is undertaken using vintage traction steam engines. In June 2021, the trust reported that in the previous season, the vessel had carried 10,000 passengers.

In August 2021, the Waimarie Operating Trust announced that they were contributing to an environmental restoration project in association with the Pungarehu Marae to plant trees and harakeke (flax) near the marae and the banks of the Whanganui River as a means of offsetting the carbon emissions of PS Waimarie.

== Gallery ==
PS Waimarie

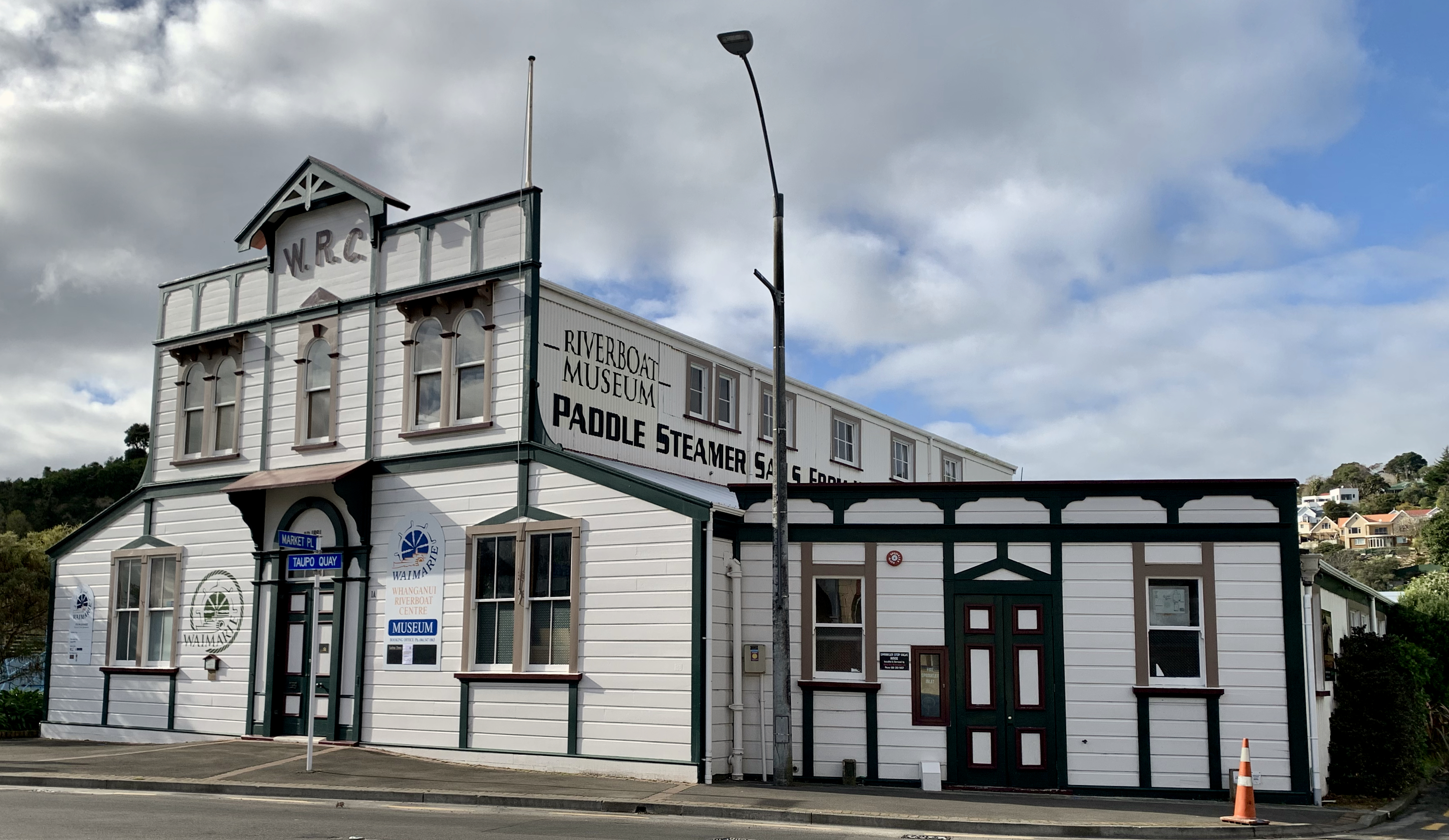
Whanganui Riverboat Centre (formerly Wanganui Rowing Club building)

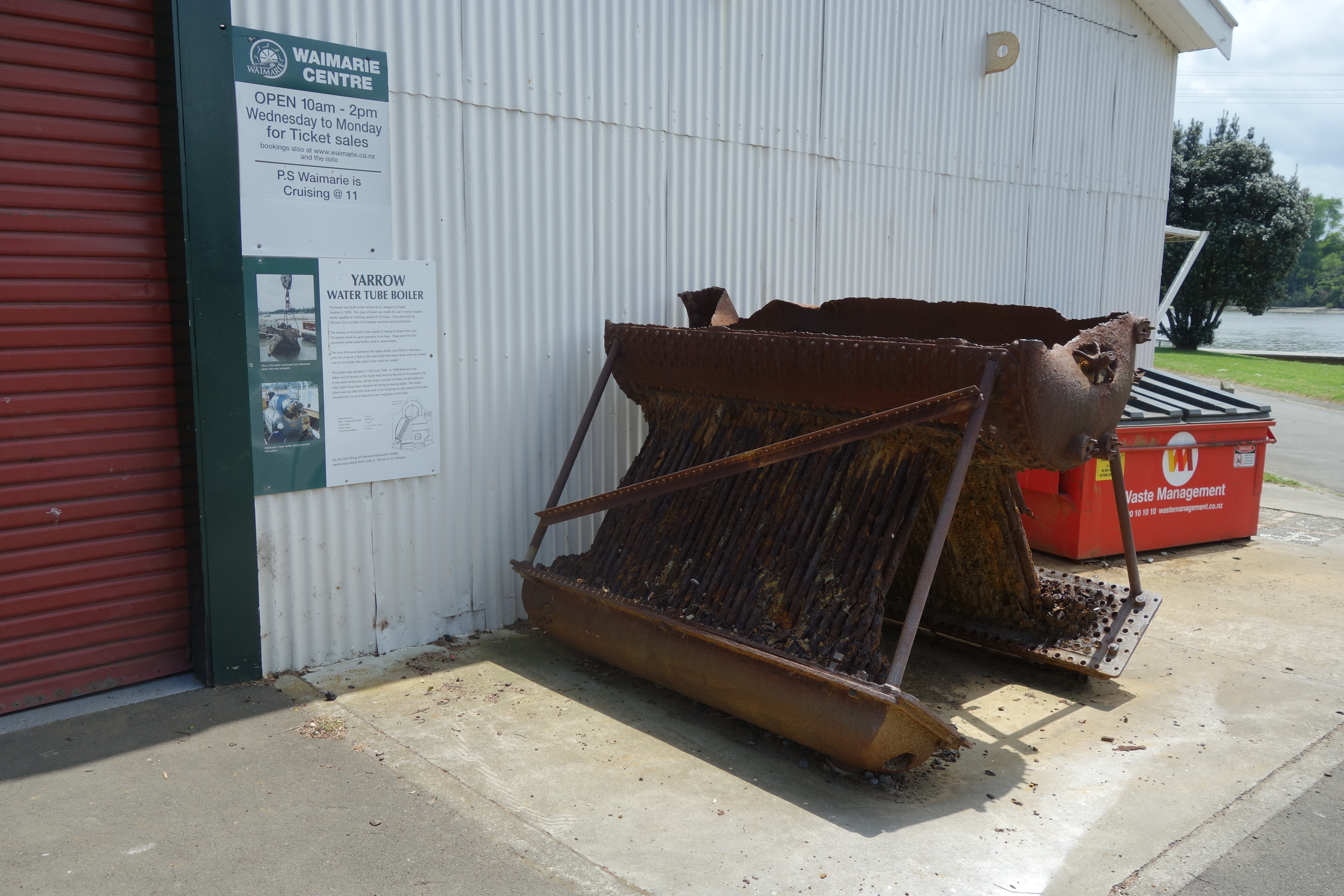
Remains of original water-tube boiler

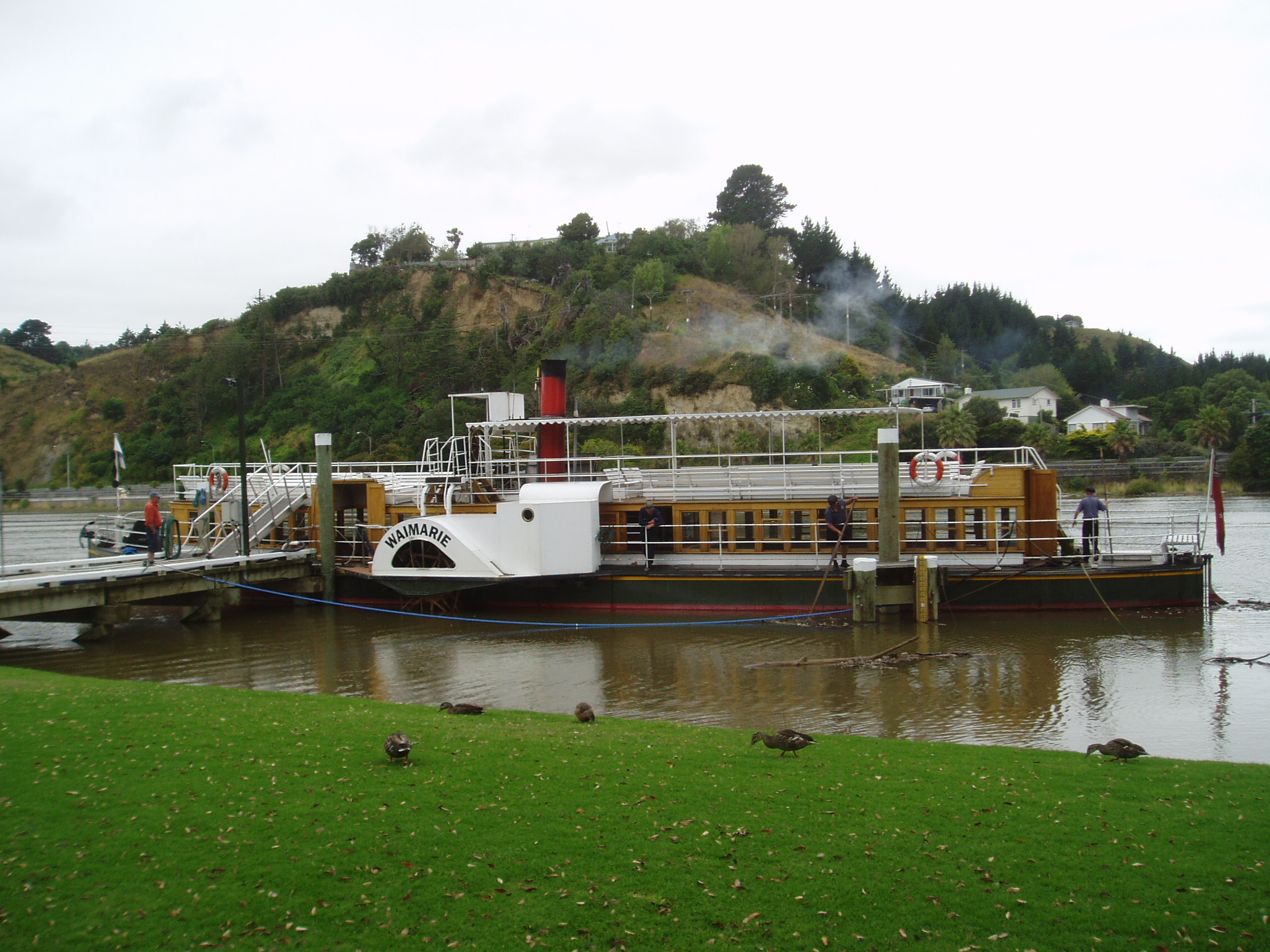
PS Waimarie on the Whanganui River

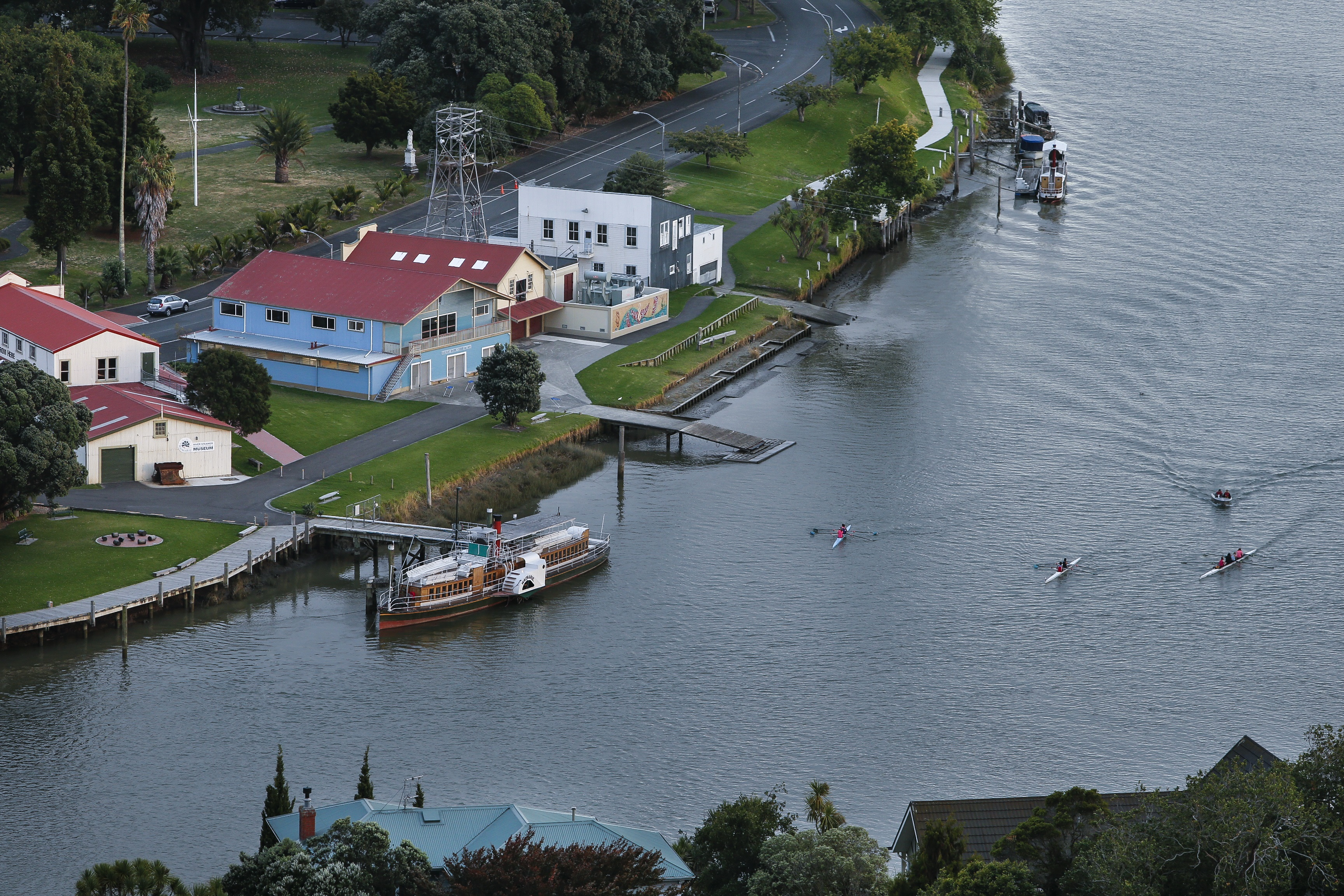
Looking down on the Whanganui River and the Paddle Steamer Waimarie, rowers and the Union Boat Club, from Durie Hill War Memorial Tower

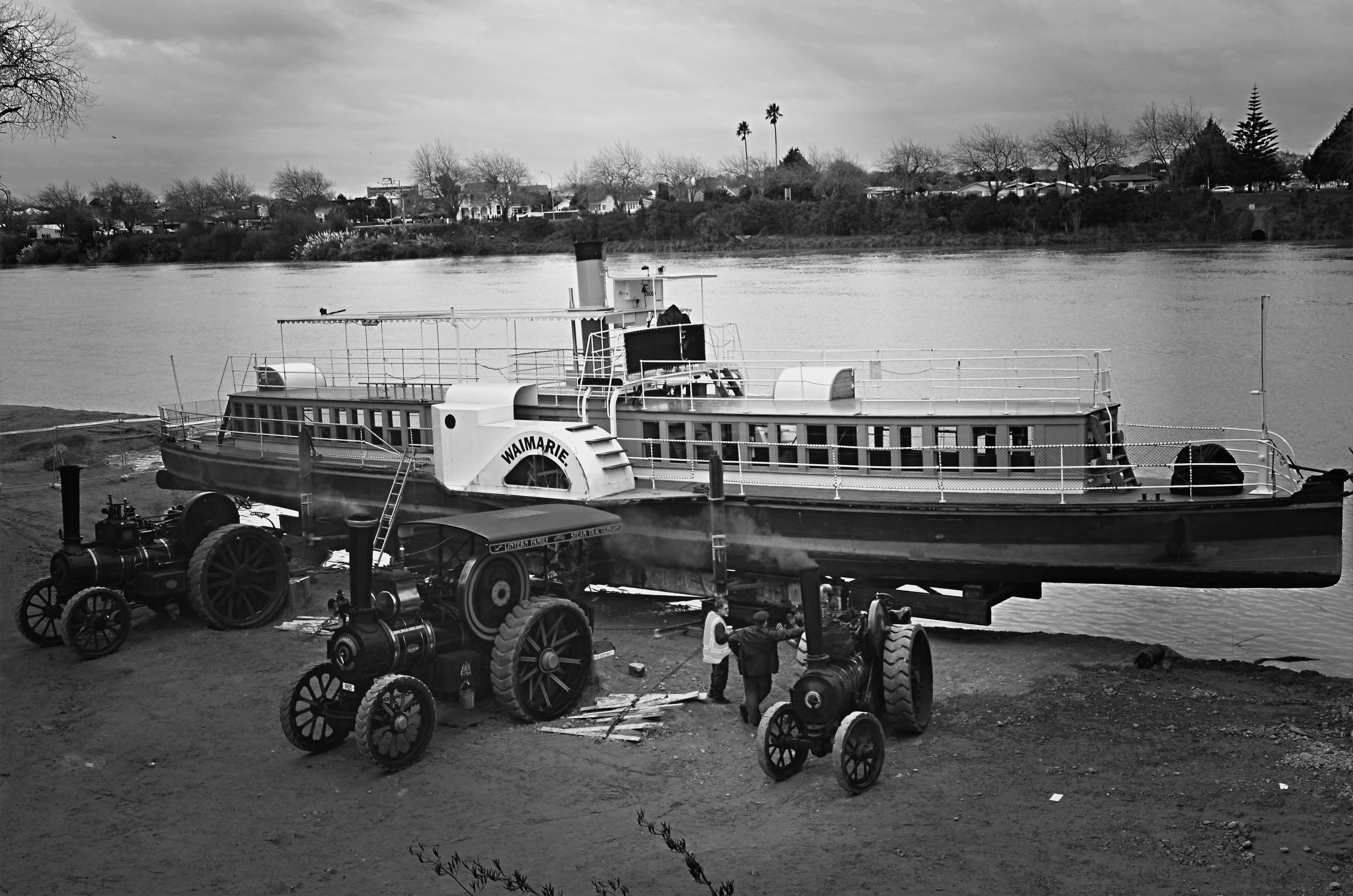
PS Waimarie being hauled out

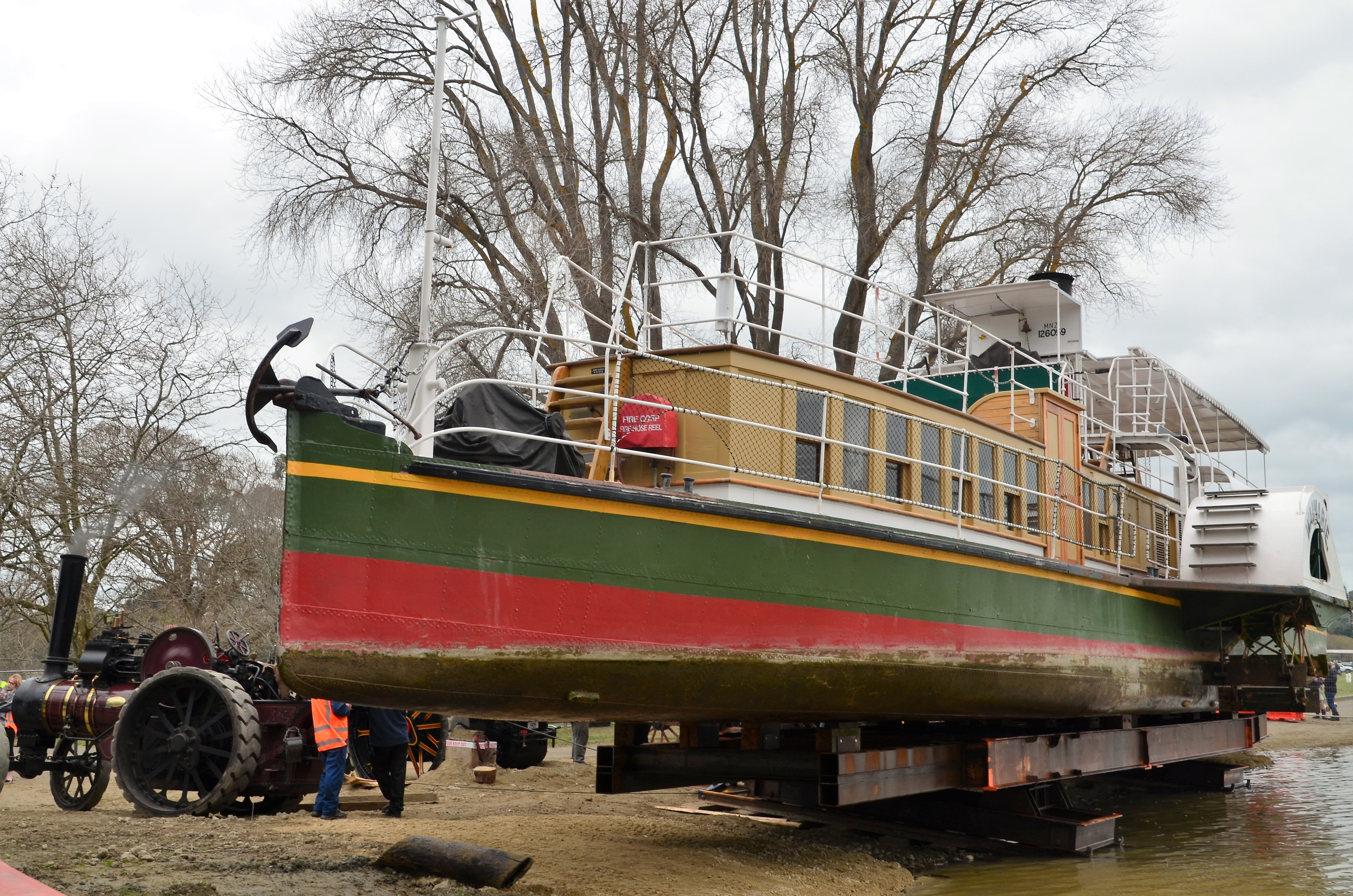
PS Waimarie out for survey
