= Taumona River =

- Location within New Zealand
- Native name: Taumona (Māori)

Location
- Country: New Zealand
- Region: Manawatū-Whanganui
- District: Ruapehu

Physical characteristics
- Source
  - coordinates: 38°53′28″S 175°4′1″E
  - elevation: 370 m (1,210 ft)
- Mouth
  - location: Ōhura River
  - coordinates: 38°54′43″S 175°2′46″E
  - elevation: 130 m (430 ft)
- Length: 4.2 km (2.6 mi)

Basin features
- Progression: Taumona River → Ōhura River → Whanganui River
- River system: Whanganui River

The Taumona River is a small river of the Manawatū-Whanganui region of New Zealand's North Island. It flows southwest from its origins 12 kilometres (7 mi) west of Taumarunui to reach the Ohura River.

== See also ==
- List of rivers of New Zealand
