= Ōhura River =

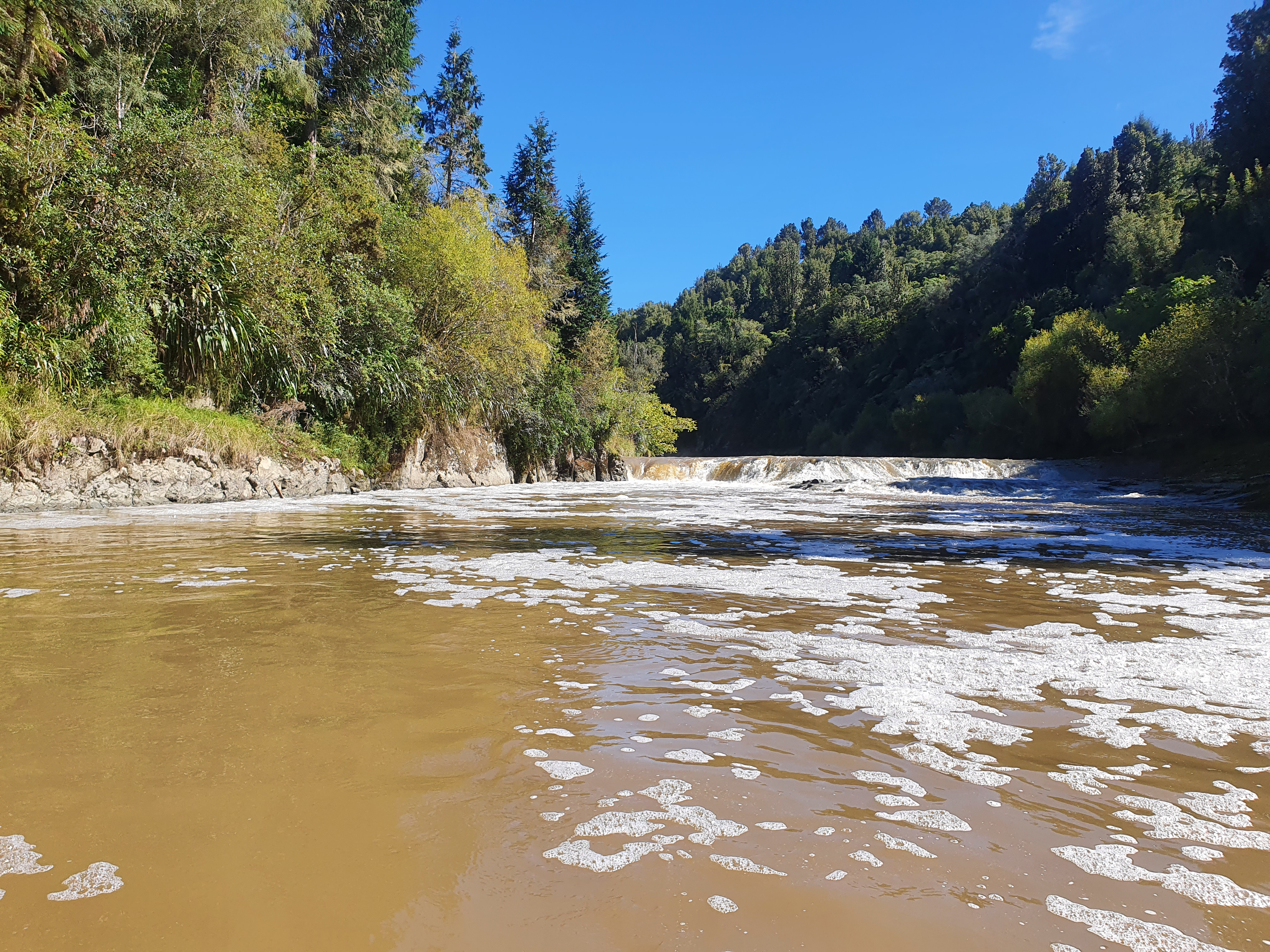
- The Ōhura River at its confluence with the Whanganui River

- Location within New Zealand
- Etymology: Māori meaning "uncovered spot"
- Native name: Ōhura (Māori)

Location
- Country: New Zealand
- Region: Manawatū-Whanganui
- District: Ruapehu
- Settlements: Matiere, Tokirima

Physical characteristics
- Source: Tangitu
  - coordinates: 38°38′38″S 175°14′28″E
  - elevation: 680 m (2,230 ft)
- Mouth: Whanganui River
  - coordinates: 39°2′20″S 175°3′52″E
  - elevation: 95 m (312 ft)
- Length: 134 km (83 mi)

Basin features
- Progression: Ōhura River → Whanganui River
- River system: Whanganui River
- Tributaries
  - left: Ohinewhatihua Stream, Mangatupoto Stream, Koromiko Stream, Otahu Stream, Mākara Stream, Ngarukehu Stream, Waipapa Stream, Matiere Stream, Pukerimu Stream, Waitangata Stream, Toetoe Stream, Rata Stream, Te Wahaoteminihia Stream, Te Awakariororiki Stream, Mangahukahuka Stream, Waipapa Stream, Kakahi Stream, Kirikiri Stream, Taumona River, Opetea Stream, Pikopiko Stream, Kiekie Stream, Opatu Stream
  - right: Otamati Stream, Kokako o te Ohinepouri Stream, Kokako o te Marama Stream, Mangamaire Stream, Waikaka Stream, Waihinau Stream, Mangaroa Stream, Mangakauanga Stream, Tokirima Stream, Whauwhau Stream, Manganuitepa Stream, Omutu Stream

The Ōhura River is a river of the western North Island of New Zealand. It flows southward from its source close to the town of Ōhura, and flows into the Whanganui River.

In July 2020, the name of the river was officially gazetted as Ōhura River by the New Zealand Geographic Board.
