= Rumatiki Ruth Wright =

New Zealand community leader and welfare officer

Rumatiki Ruth Wright MBE (née Gray, 27 April 1908 – 15 December 1982) was a notable New Zealand community leader and Māori welfare officer. Of Māori descent, she identified with the Ngāti Kura iwi. She was born in Pipiriki, New Zealand, in 1908.

In the 1958 New Year Honours Wright was appointed a Member of the Order of the British Empire for services to the Māori people, especially as senior lady Māori welfare officer at Taumarunui.
