= Reginald Newton Biggs =

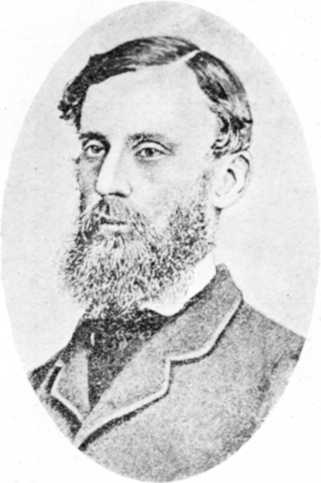
Reginald Newton Biggs

Reginald Newton Biggs (16 June 1831–10 November 1868) was a New Zealand station manager, soldier and magistrate. He was born in England on 16 June 1831, and was reported in New Zealand as a settler in the area around Whanganui in 1855. From 1862 he was an officer in the Hawke's Bay volunteers and was involved in a number of actions in the New Zealand Wars. Biggs led the pursuit of Te Kooti, but Te Kooti led an attack on a settlement at Matawhero that killed a number of European settlers, their families, and local Māori. Biggs, his wife, their son and their nurse were amongst those killed on 10 November 1868.

== See also ==
- Te Kooti's War
