= Andrew Anderson (riverboat skipper) =

Andrew Anderson (17 October 1895 – 16 August 1958) was a New Zealand riverboat skipper on the Whanganui River. Of Māori descent, he identified with Ngāti Kura, a hapū of the Ngāti Ruanui iwi. He was born in Pipiriki, New Zealand on 17 October 1895.
