= Te Pōrere Redoubts =

Military fortification in New Zealand

- Te Pōrere, near Tūrangi, New Zealand

Site information
- Type: Redoubt
- Controlled by: Heritage New Zealand
- Open to the public: Yes

Location
- Map including fortification features of upper (west) and lower (east) Te Pōrere redoubts (brown markers).
- Coordinates: 39°2′47″S 175°35′10″E.

Site history
- Built: 1869
- Materials: Earthworks
- Battles/wars: New Zealand Wars: Battle of Te Pōrere

Heritage New Zealand – Category 1
- Designated: 3 March 2006
- Reference no.: 7652

The Te Pōrere Redoubts are historic fortifications of the New Zealand Wars, located at Te Pōrere, to the southwest of the current site of Tūrangi, in New Zealand. Built by the Māori warrior Te Kooti and his Ringatū followers in September 1869, the following month they were the site of the Battle of Te Pōrere, between Te Kooti's forces and those of the New Zealand colonial government's Armed Constabulary and Māori aligned with the government—known as kūpapa. It was abandoned after the battle. The site of the redoubts, which were restored after it was designated as a National Historic Place in February 1961, is administered by Heritage New Zealand.

== History ==
Te Kooti's War, one of the conflicts of the New Zealand Wars, spanned the period from July 1868 to May 1872. It involved Te Kooti, the Māori leader of a religion called Ringatū, and several of his followers who had escaped to mainland New Zealand from imprisonment on the Chatham Islands in July 1868. Pursued by local militia, he raided Matawhero and instigated a massacre of local Māori and settlers. Engagements with the government's Armed Constabulary and kūpapa—allied Māori—followed and Te Kooti's forces suffered a major defeat at Ngātapa in January 1869. They subsequently fled to the Urewera ranges. Te Kooti perpetuated further raids on the civilian population and with government forces still after him, Te Kooti and his followers gradually moved to the Central Plateau. He had supporters among the local tribe, Ngāti Tūwharetoa.

Te Kooti ambushed a party of Armed Constabulary near Lake Taupō in June and the government began to move troops to the area. Te Kooti skirmished with kūpapa in September in an attempt to disrupt the build up but his efforts were relatively ineffective. The redoubts at Te Pōrere were constructed later in the month, most likely by Te Kooti and his followers. Alternatively, it is possible that they were constructed by Ngāti Tūwharetoa. In the Battle of Te Pōrere, government forces attacked Te Pōrere on 4 October, inflicting a major defeat on Te Kooti. While Te Kooti, who was wounded in the hand in the fighting, was able to escape, 37 of his followers were killed. Their bodies were buried in the main fortification at Te Pōrere. The Battle of Te Pōrere was the last major engagement of the New Zealand Wars and also marked the last occasion on which an attack was made on a prepared defensive position in New Zealand.

== Description ==
Te Pōrere is a locality situated about 10 kilometres (6.2 mi) to the west of Lake Rotoaira and southwest of the current site of the town of Tūrangi. The defensive works there were three distinct fortifications: the main pā (hillfort), also known as the 'upper redoubt', the 'lower redoubt', which was actually a series of trenches, and a rifle pit.

=== Upper redoubt ===
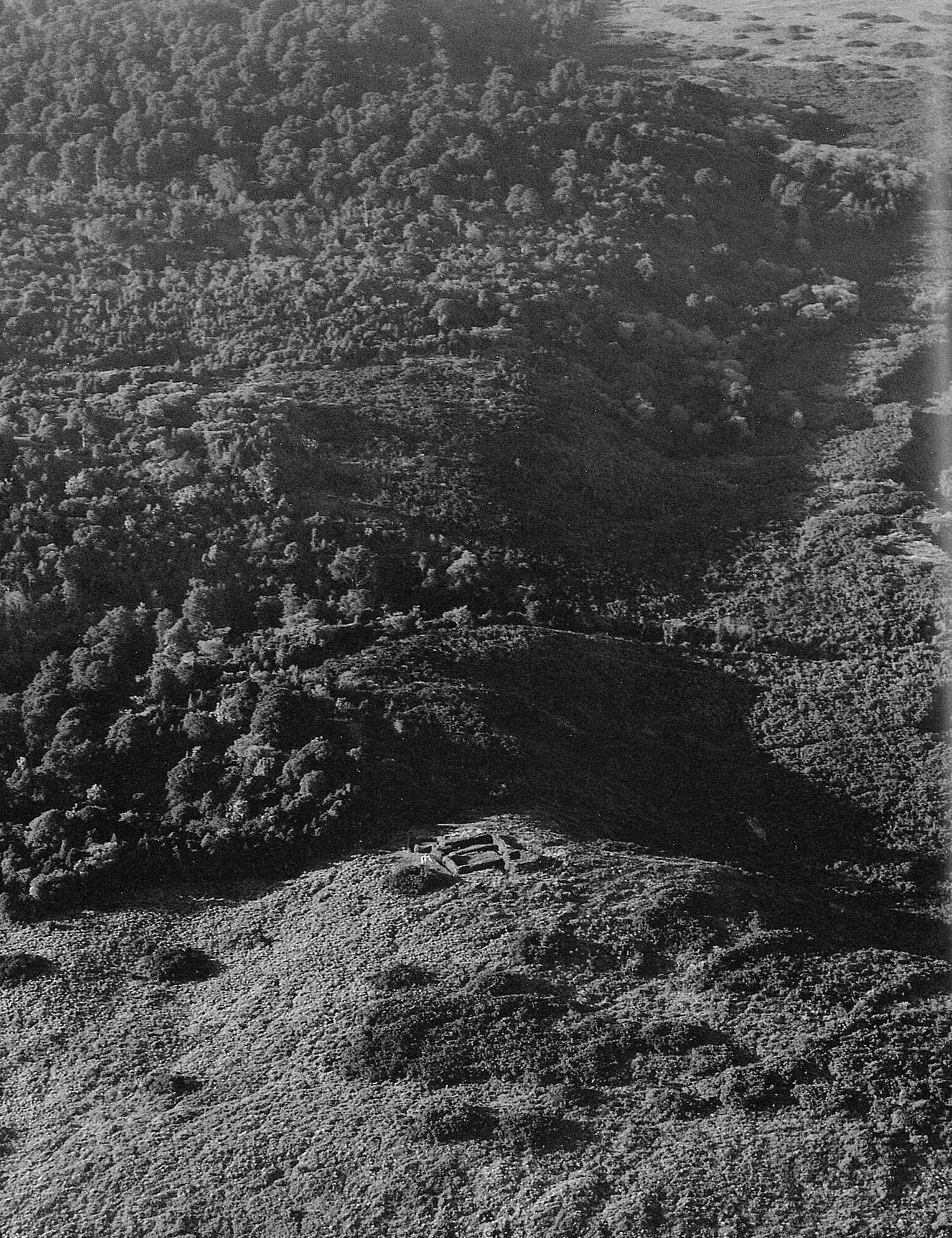
A view, looking north, of the upper redoubt at Te Pōrere

The main pā was built in the style of a redoubt, as commonly used by the British Army during the New Zealand Wars. A redoubt is a type of fortification which, since it did not require timber elements, could be constructed relatively quickly by troops in the field. Usually taking a square or rectangular plan form, they were prepared by excavating a ditch to define the perimeter of the redoubt. The dug out earth was piled up on the inner side of the ditch to form a parapet.

The upper redoubt was built on an elevated site with its western side close to the bush line. The east side faced a swampy plain leading towards Lake Rotoaira. It is about 20 metres (66 ft) square with bastions extending from the northwest and southeast corners. At the time of the battle, the earthen walls ranged from just under 2 metres (6.6 ft) to about 3 metres (9.8 ft). A ditch surrounded a substantial portion of the walls, most noticeably about the portions lowest in height. The bastions in theory offered defenders the ability to fire down onto the ditch but in practice were poorly angled and did not provide sufficient coverage to achieve this. Loop holes were provided at regular intervals along the wall. The main entrance/exit point, which coincided with a break in the ditch, was midway along the western wall which, due to its proximity to the bush, offered a line of escape for its occupants. A major flaw in the redoubt was the construction of the loop holes; these lacked sufficient clearance for weapons to be aimed into the ditch. This meant that the defenders needed to fire their weapons over the top of the parapet, thus exposing themselves, when shooting at attackers sheltering in the ditches.

A low wall, running along a west–east axis, separated a large portion of the interior of the upper redoubt into two distinct halves. This wall is unlikely to have fulfilled a defensive function and may have been used to separate the defenders; Te Kooti and his followers from the East Cape in one half, while the local Tūwharetoa who had joined Te Kooti since his arrival in the area in the other half.

=== Lower redoubt ===
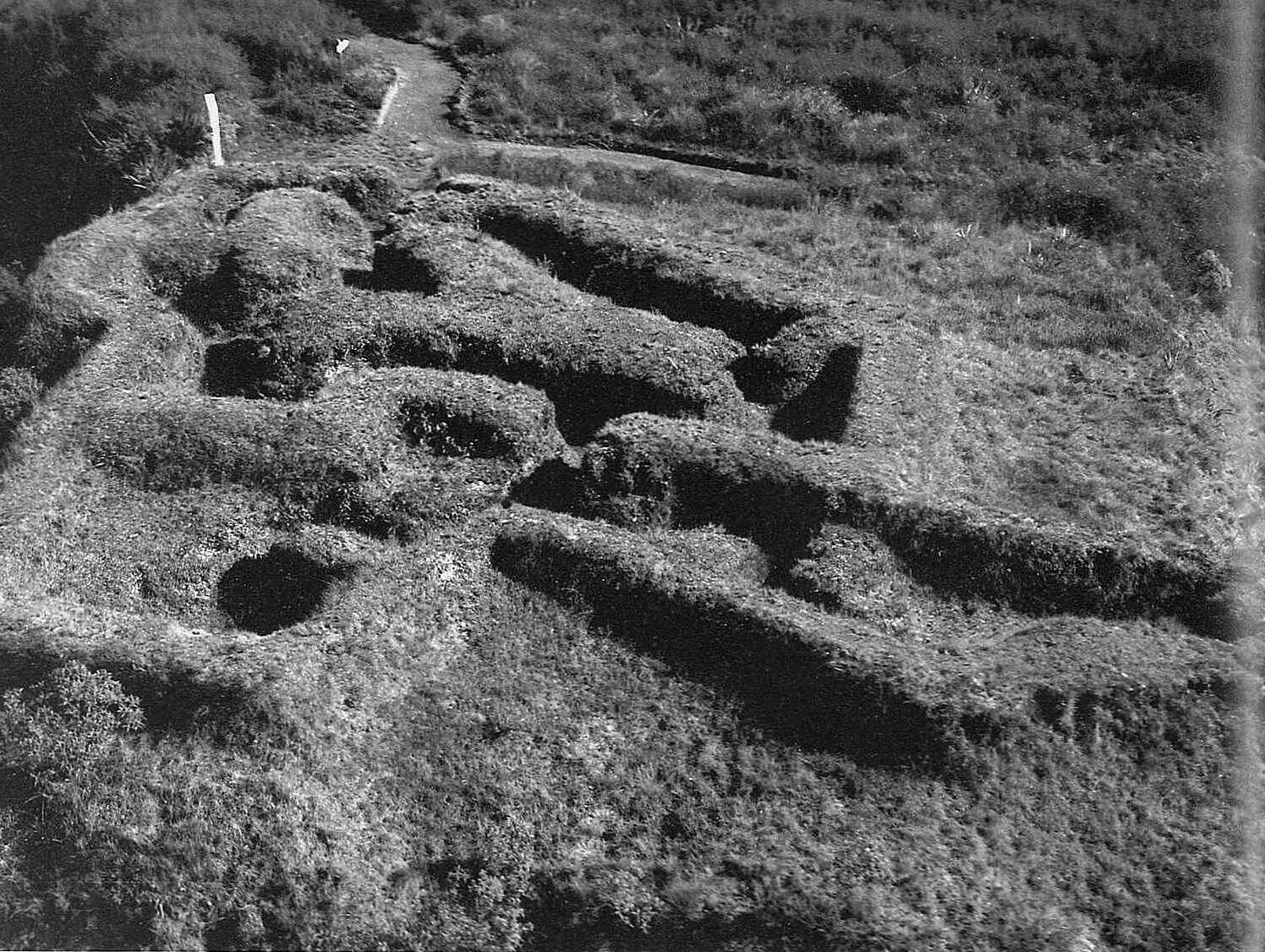
A view of the lower redoubt

The lower redoubt, located to the east of the upper redoubt, is positioned on a knoll on the west or left bank of a stream which flowed from the western side of Tongariro mountain to the Whanganui River. This was a complex of several trenches, more in keeping with a traditional Māori fortification. While providing cover nearly all round, the position lacked depth and had a limited field of view.

=== Rifle pit ===
The rifle pit, southeast of the lower redoubt, was located on the east or right bank of the Wanganui River; some distance to the southeast from the main redoubt, it may have served as an observation post. The main portion was about five feet deep, with a wall thrown up on its eastern front for protection.

== Site ==
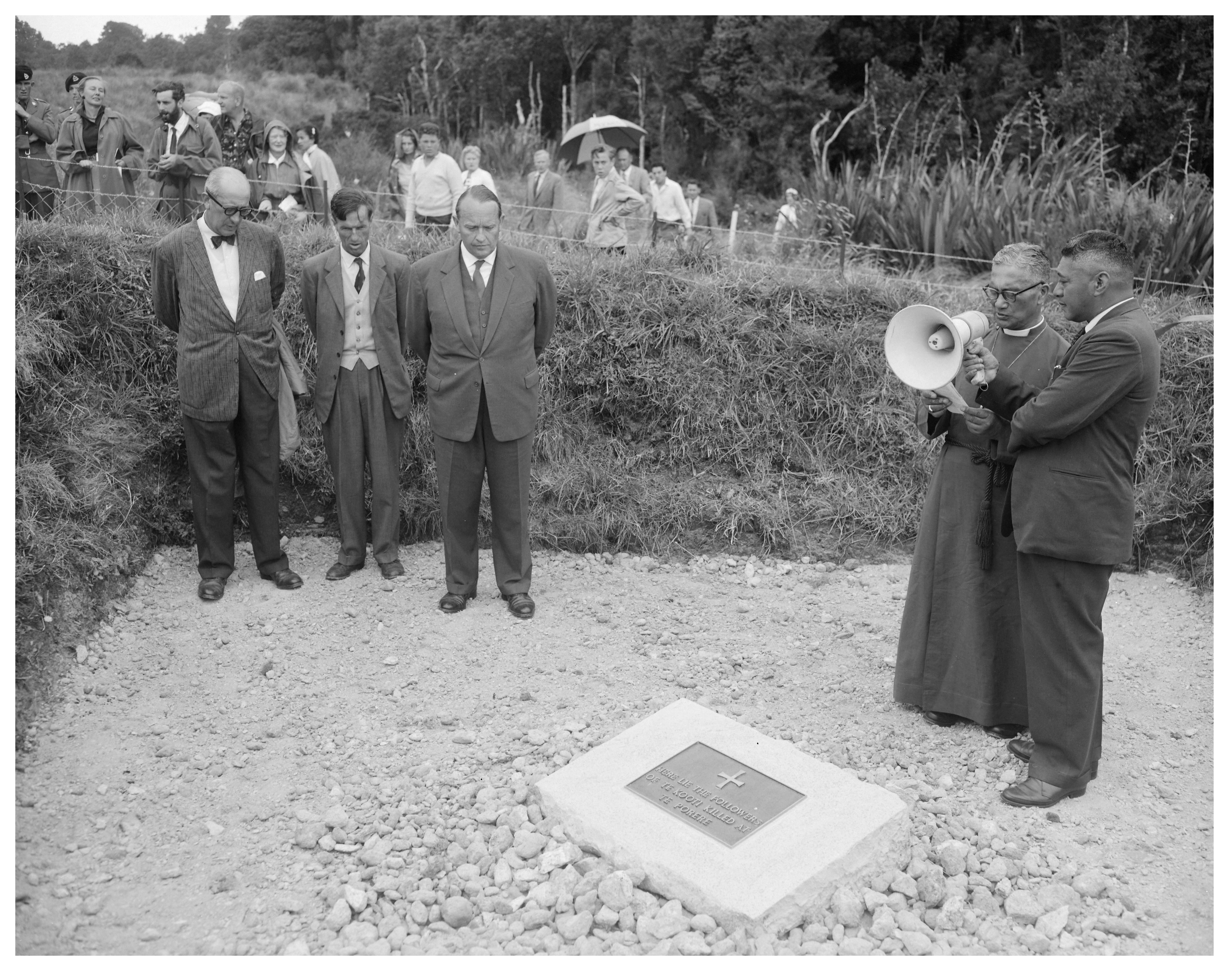
When Te Pōrere was declared a National Historic Place on 18 February 1961, a plaque, dedicated to those followers of Te Kooti who were killed in the battle and buried at the site, was unveiled

Te Pōrere was abandoned after the battle but remained in generally good condition although with some growth of vegetation along the walls over time. The historian James Cowan, writing in 1923 described the fortifications as being in a "fair state of preservation". The land on which the battle took place remained in Māori ownership until 1958, when it, and around 120 acres of the surrounding forest, was transferred to the Historic Places Trust, the predecessor of Heritage New Zealand. Shortly afterwards, Ormond Wilson, the chairman of the Historic Places Trust, commenced efforts to restore Te Pōrere. As part of the restoration work, vegetation was cut back, the breastworks of the redoubts reconstructed, and a pathway constructed between the site and a car park located off State Highway 47.

The site was declared a National Historic Place in a ceremony held at Te Pōrere on 18 February 1961 by the Governor-General of New Zealand, Viscount Cobham. The ceremony also included the unveiling and dedication of a plaque to the 37 followers of Te Kooti killed in the Battle of Te Pōrere and buried within the upper redoubt. The fortifications at Te Pōrere were designated as a Category 1 Historic Place by Heritage New Zealand on 3 March 2006, with the list number 7652.

Historian Ian McGibbon considers Te Pōrere to be the best preserved pā site in New Zealand, although not the best example since it is not representative of the traditional fortification of the type developed by Māori. It is of major historical importance in New Zealand as a remnant of the last major engagement of the New Zealand Wars involving a prepared defensive position and for its connection to Te Kooti. It is also of significance to Ngāti Tūwharetoa and the Ringatū Church.
