= Pungapunga River =

- Location within New Zealand
- Native name: Pungapunga (Māori)

Location
- Country: New Zealand
- Region: Manawatū-Whanganui
- District: Ruapehu

Physical characteristics
- Source: Hauhungaroa
  - location: Hauhungaroa Range
  - coordinates: 38°50′02″S 175°33′40″E
  - elevation: 1,040 m (3,410 ft)
- Mouth: Whanganui River
  - location: Manunui
  - coordinates: 38°53′28″S 175°20′00″E
  - elevation: 172 m (564 ft)
- Length: 22 km (14 mi)

Basin features
- Progression: Pungapunga River → Whanganui River
- River system: Whanganui River

The Pungapunga River is a river of the Manawatū-Whanganui region of New Zealand's North Island. It flows predominantly southwest from the southeastern foothills of the Hahungaroa Range, reaching the Whanganui River 5 kilometres (3 mi) east of Taumarunui.

== See also ==
- List of rivers of New Zealand
