= Whanganui River =

Major river in the North Island of New Zealand

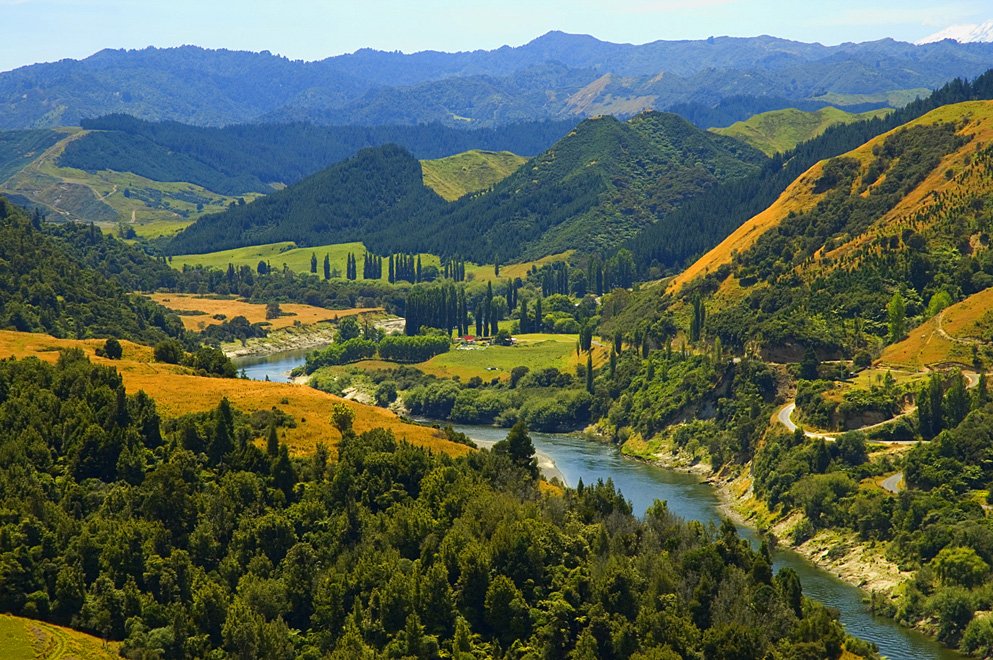
- The Whanganui River. Mount Ruapehu can partly be seen at the top right of the scene.

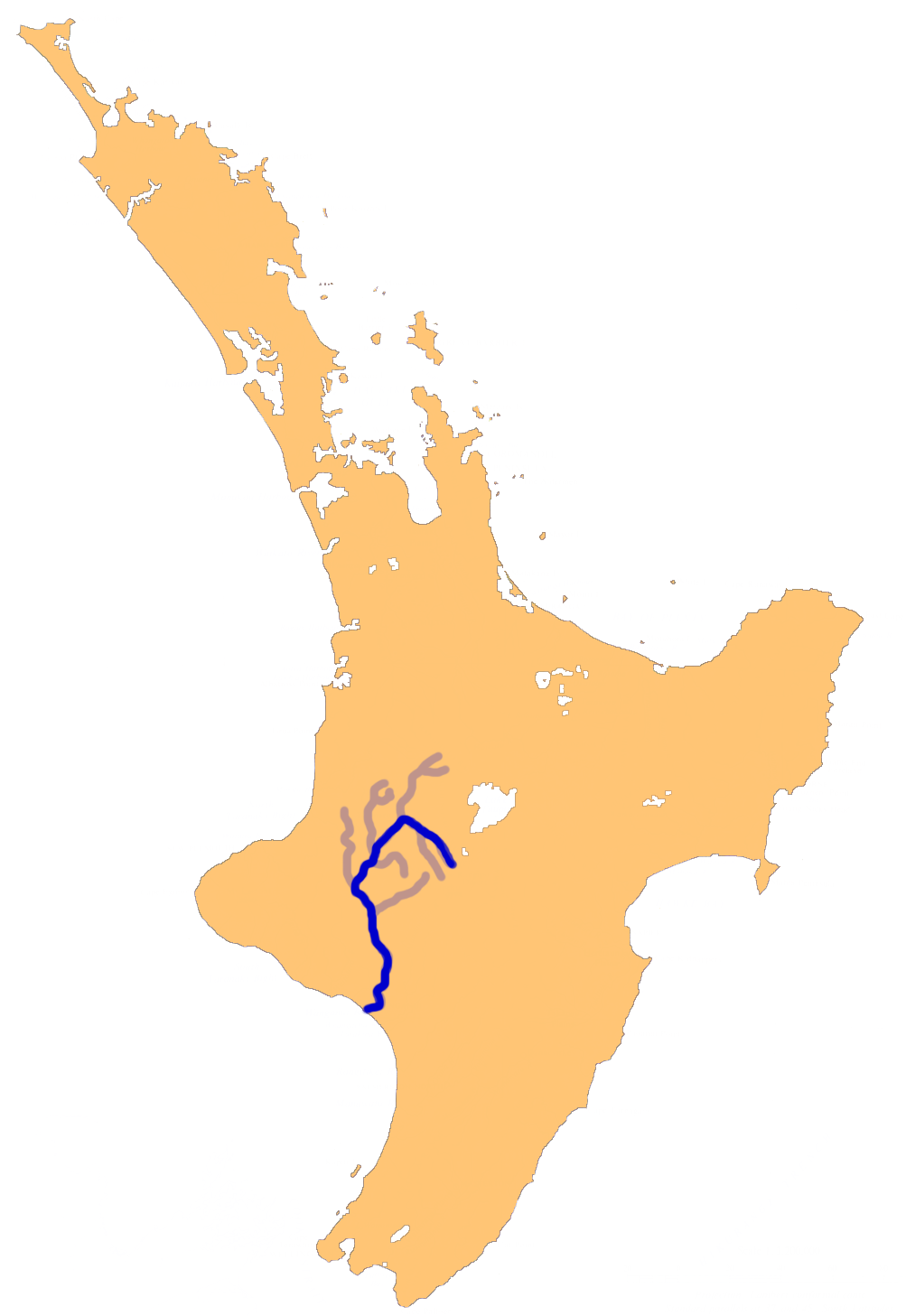
- The Whanganui River system
- Native name: Whanganui (Māori)

Location
- Country: New Zealand
- Region: Manawatū-Whanganui
- Towns and cities: Taumarunui, Whanganui

Physical characteristics
- Source: Mount Tongariro
- Mouth: Tasman Sea
  - coordinates: 39°56.89′S 174°59.22′E
  - elevation: Sea level
- Length: 290 km (180 mi)
- Basin size: 7,380 km^{2} (2,850 sq mi)
- Discharge
  - average: 219 m^{3}/s (7,700 cu ft/s)

Basin features
- Tributaries
  - left: Whakapapa River, Retaruke River, Manganui o te Ao River
  - right: Pungapunga River, Ongarue River, Ōhura River, Tāngarākau River, Whangamōmona River

The Whanganui River is a major river in the North Island of New Zealand. It is the country's third-longest river, and has special status owing to its importance to the region's Māori people. In March 2017 it became the world's second natural resource (after Te Urewera) to be given its own legal identity, with the rights, duties and liabilities of a legal person. The Whanganui Treaty settlement brought the longest-running litigation in New Zealand history to an end.

== Geography ==
With a length of 290 kilometres (180 mi), the Whanganui is the country's third-longest river. Much of the land to either side of the upper reaches is part of the Whanganui National Park, though the river itself is not part of the park.

The river rises on the northern slopes of Mount Tongariro, one of the three active volcanoes of the central plateau, close to Lake Rotoaira. It flows to the north-west before turning south-west at Taumarunui. From here it runs through the rough, bush-clad hill country of the King Country before turning south-east and flowing past the small settlements of Pipiriki and Jerusalem, before reaching the coast at the city of Whanganui. It is one of the country's longest navigable rivers.

The river valley changed in the 1843 Wanganui earthquake.

In 1975, a minor eruption from Mount Ruapehu spilled some of the contents from the Ruapehu Crater Lake (the same root cause of the Tangiwai disaster). This toxic water entered the Whanganui River and had the effect of killing much of the fish life downstream. In the aftermath of the poisoning, eels as large as 8.2 kilograms (18 lb) and trout as large as 2.3 kilograms (5.1 lb) were washed up dead along the banks of the river. The tributary Whakapapa River had fish losses due to a lahar from Ruapehu in April 1975. This possibly had effects downstream.

=== Tributaries ===
Tributary name	Length (km)	Km from mouth	Confluence coordinates	Altitude
Mount Tongariro	River source	290 km	39°07.91′S 175°37.95′E
Whakapapa River	65 km (40 mi)		38°55′48″S 175°24′28″E	255 m (837 ft)
Pungapunga River	22 km (14 mi)		38°53′30″S 175°20′0″E	172 m (564 ft)
Ongarue River	73 km (45 mi)		38°53′31″S 175°15′11″E	144 m (472 ft)
Ōhura River	134 km (83 mi)		39°02′20″S 175°3′52″E	114 m (374 ft)
Retaruke River	64 km (40 mi)		39°06′9″S 175°4′12″E	108 m (354 ft)
Tāngarākau River	26 km (16 mi)		39°14′17″S 174°52′52″E	85 m (279 ft)
Whangamōmona River	22 km (14 mi)		39°16′17″S 174°53′23″E	82 m (269 ft)
Manganui o te Ao River	32 km (20 mi)		39°24′18″S 175°2′42″E	62 m (203 ft)
Tasman Sea	River mouth	0 km	39°56.89′S 174°59.22′E	0 m

== History ==
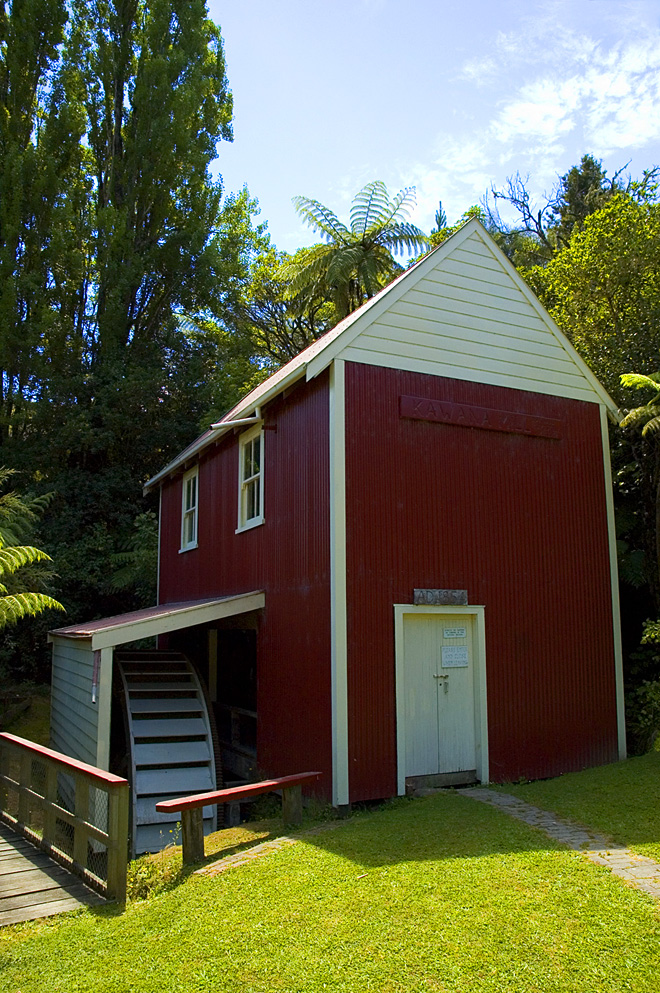
Kawana flour mill, 1854 (restored), Matahiwi

Māori legend explains the formation of the river in the Mount Taranaki legend. When Mount Taranaki left the central plateau for the coast, the land was split open, and the river filled the rift.

Another Māori legend explains that after Māui caught the giant fish that was to become the North Island of New Zealand, known as Te Ika-a-Māui, he prayed to Ranginui who then sent two tear drops to land on Māui's fish. These two tear drops then became the rivers Whanganui and Waikato.

According to Māori tradition, the river was first explored by Tamatea, one of the leaders of the original migration to the new land, who travelled up the river and on to Lake Taupō. Many places along the river are named in his honour.

The Whanganui River was an important communication route to the central North Island, both for Māori and for settlers, despite many stretches of white water and over 200 rapids. Prior to the arrival of Europeans, the area around the Whanganui was densely inhabited and with the arrival of the colonial settlers, the area near the river's mouth became a major trading post.

Although it was already a significant route to the interior, the major development of the river as a trade route was by Alexander Hatrick, who started the first regular steam-boat service in 1892. The service eventually ran to Taumarunui where rail and coach services connected with points north. One of Hatrick's original boats, paddle-steamer PS Waimarie, has been restored and runs scheduled sailings in Whanganui. Another of the Hatrick boats, MV Wairua, has also been restored and can be seen on the river.

During the early 20th century, the Wanganui River, as it was then called, was one of the country's top tourist attractions, its rugged beauty and the Māori kāinga (villages) that dotted the banks attracting thousands of tourists a year.

With the completion of the North Island Main Trunk railway, the need for the steamboat route to the north greatly diminished, and the main economic activity of the river area became forestry. During the 1930s, attempts were made to open the river valley up as farmland, but they were not successful. One legacy of that time is the Bridge to Nowhere, built to provide access to settlements long since abandoned.

In 1912–13 the French filmmaker Gaston Méliès shot a (now lost) documentary film The River Wanganui about the river, calling it the Rhine of New Zealand.

The settlement of Jerusalem is of particular note. Jerusalem was home to two famous New Zealanders, Mother Mary Joseph Aubert, whose Catholic mission is still located at Jerusalem, and New Zealand poet James K. Baxter, who established a commune at the settlement in 1970.

Other settlements are Tieke Kāinga, Pipiriki, Rānana, Matahiwi, and Koriniti.

=== Taonga and Māori land claims ===
The river is of special and spiritual importance for Māori, who also refer to it as Te awa tupua. It was the home for a large proportion of Māori villages in pre-European times. As such, it is regarded as taonga, a special treasure. Local iwi first petitioned Parliament in the 1870s, and efforts have since been made to safeguard the river and give it the respect it deserves.

For the same reason, the river has been one of the most fiercely contested regions of the country in claims before the Waitangi Tribunal for the return of tribal lands. The Whanganui River claim is heralded as the longest-running legal case in New Zealand history with petitions and court action in the 1930s, Waitangi Tribunal hearings in the 1990s, the ongoing Tieke Marae land occupation since 1993, and the highly publicised Moutoa Gardens occupation in 1995.

On 30 August 2012 agreement was reached that entitled the Whanganui River to a legal identity, a first in the world, and on 15 March 2017 the relevant settlement was passed into law (Te Awa Tupua (Whanganui River Claims Settlement) Act 2017) by the New Zealand Parliament. Chris Finlayson, the Minister for Treaty of Waitangi Negotiations, said the river would have an identity "with all the corresponding rights, duties and liabilities of a legal person". He said some people would consider it strange, but it is "no stranger than family trusts, or companies, or incorporated societies." The bill finalised 140-year-old negotiations between Māori and the government. The river will be represented by two officials, one from Māori and the other from the government.

=== Naming ===
Whanganui is a phrase meaning "big bay" or "big harbour". Some very early maps show that European settlers called the river the Knowsley River, however it was known as the Wanganui River until its name was officially changed to Whanganui in 1991, respecting the wishes of local iwi. Part of the reason for this change was also to avoid confusion with the Wanganui River in the South Island. The city at the river's mouth was called Wanganui until December 2009, when the government decided that while either spelling was acceptable, Crown agencies would use the Whanganui spelling.

See Controversy over Wanganui/Whanganui spelling

== Fauna and flora ==
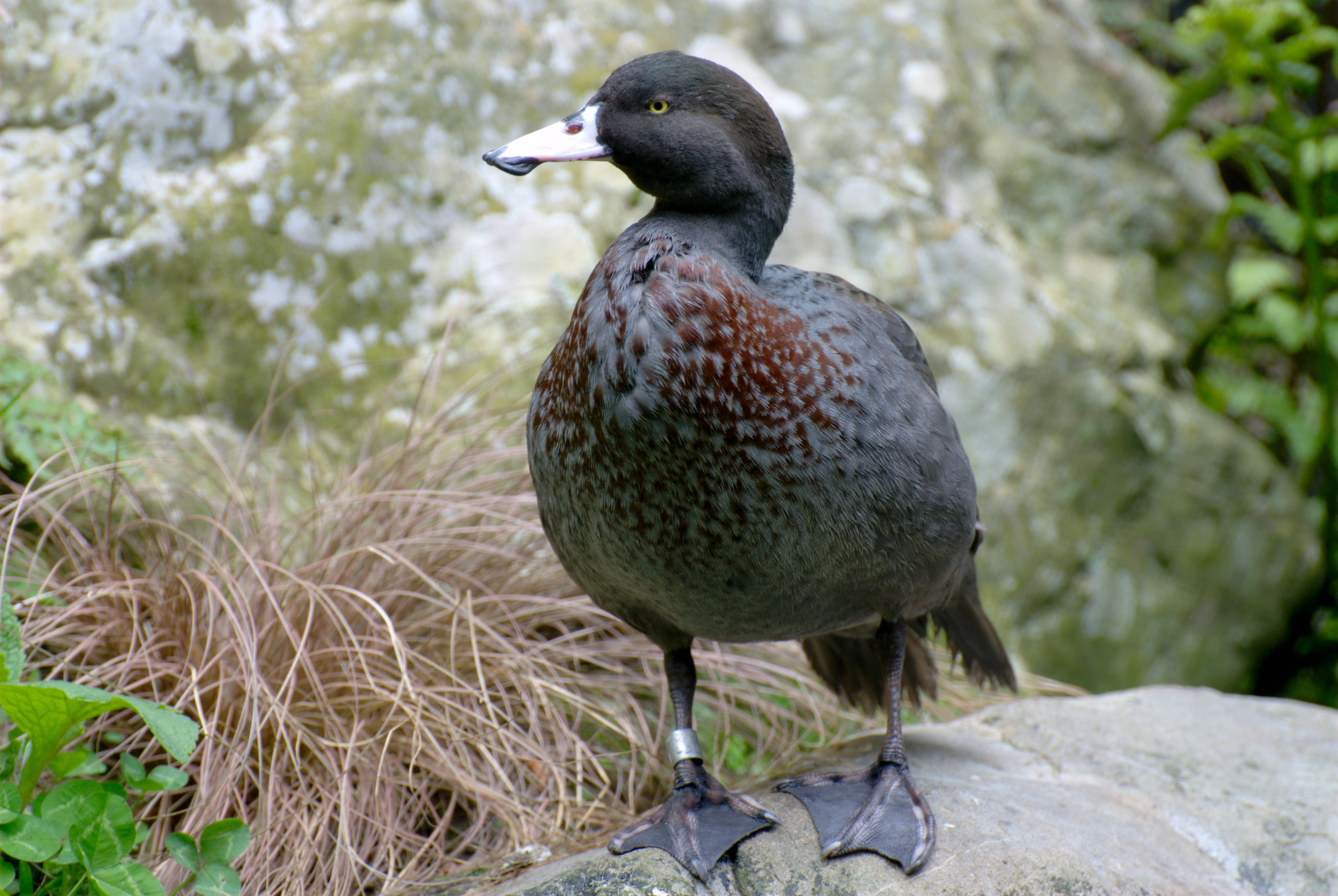
Blue duck (whio) at Staglands, Akatarawa, New Zealand

Native fish species in the river include Cran's bully, upland bully, climbing galaxias (kōaro), longfin and short-finned eels, pouched lamprey, shortjaw kōkopu, torrentfish, New Zealand smelt and black flounder. Introduced brown and rainbow trout are found, although not in high numbers, and there have been reports of catfish.

Other native aquatic species include kōura and declining numbers of New Zealand freshwater mussels. The river and its tributaries are home to a variety of invertebrates such as mayflies, stoneflies and caddis flies.

Blue duck (whio) populations can be found at the junction of the Whanganui River and the Mangatepopo and Okupata streams. The Nankeen night heron established roosts along the Whanganui River in the 1990s and is breeding in New Zealand only in this location.

Much of the flora in the river basin can be characterised as a broadleaf and podocarp forest; understory species include crown fern (Blechnum discolor), and a variety of other ferns and shrubs.

== River boats ==
In 1892 Alexander Hatrick was contracted by Thomas Cook & Son to carry tourists to Pipiriki on the paddle-steamer PS Waimarie, the journey was "The Rhine of Maoriland" tourist route into the interior of New Zealand. The river boat subsequently carried mail, passengers and cargo.

PS Waimarie operates on the lower stretches of the river, including dinner cruises to Avoca Hotel at Upokongaro and trips to Hipango Park for overnight camping.

On 18 June 2010 the Adventurer 2 river boat embarked, attempting to make the 230-kilometre (140 mi) voyage to Taumarunui. The first voyage to Taumarunui in 82 years. The Adventurer 2 now offers this trip to tourist as an historic alternative to jet boating and canoeing the river. Though in low water flows it cannot make it all the way to Taumarunui.

=== River boat landings ===
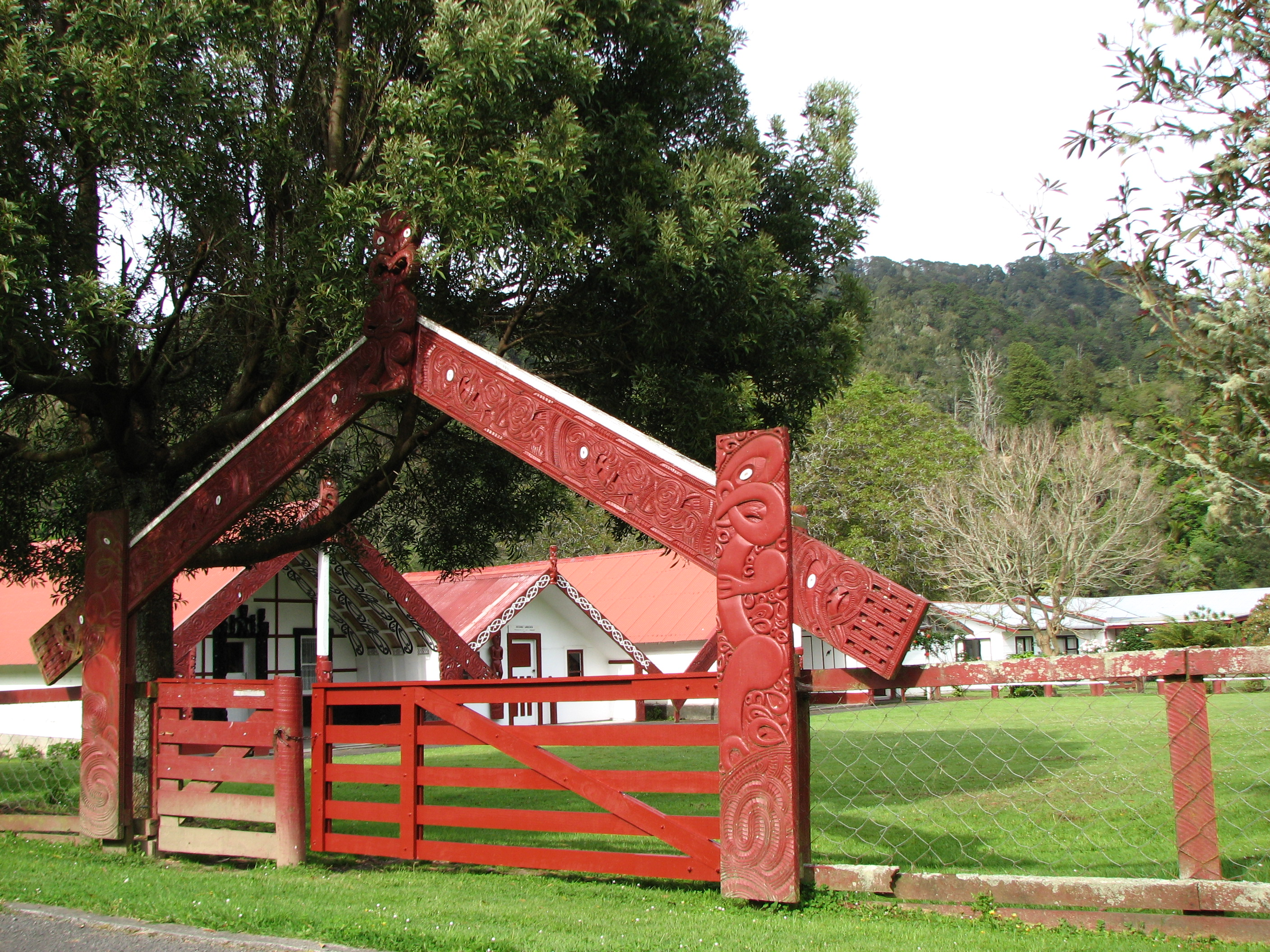
One of the many Māori marae along the Whanganui River

The Whanganui River was the supply artery for the early communities along its banks. River boats used to ply the river, and also into the Ōhura River and Ongarue Rivers unless these routes were log jammed after floods.

Between 1891 and 1958 the Alexander Hatrick Riverboat service operated on the Whanganui River. The paddle-steamer Wairere ordered from London and shipped in sections then assembled in Whanganui in late 1891.

It is said that Taumarunui was the highest reach of the Whanganui River that was navigable by river boat. The river flow was managed by the "Wanganui River Trust Board" which built containing walls to direct and deepen the rivers channels for river traffic. Even so, river boats sometimes found it necessary to winch themselves up the more difficult rapids. The River Trust existed from 1891 to 1940.

Landing name	Community serviced	Distance from mouth	Travel time up/down	Coordinates
Taumarunui Landing	Taumarunui	144 mi (232 km)
Kirikau Landing	Kirikau
Te Maire Landing	Te Maire
Otumangu Landing	Otumangu	132 mi (212 km)
Lacy's Landing
Wades Landing	Retaruke Valley	108 mi (174 km)		39°6.65′S 175°3.98′E
Mangapurua Landing	Mangapurua Valley	75 mi (121 km)
Tangahoe Landing	Tāngahoe	73 mi (117 km)
Mangatiti Landing	Mangatiti	72 mi (116 km)
Parinui Landing	Parinui	71 mi (114 km)
Ramanui Landing	Ramanui	70 mi (110 km)
Pipiriki landing	Pipiriki
Lower Pipiriki landing	Pipiriki	57 mi (92 km)
Te Tuhi Landing	Ahuahu Stream valley
Hipango Park Landing	?
Up-river Landing
Wanganui Wharves	Whanganui

== Recreational use ==
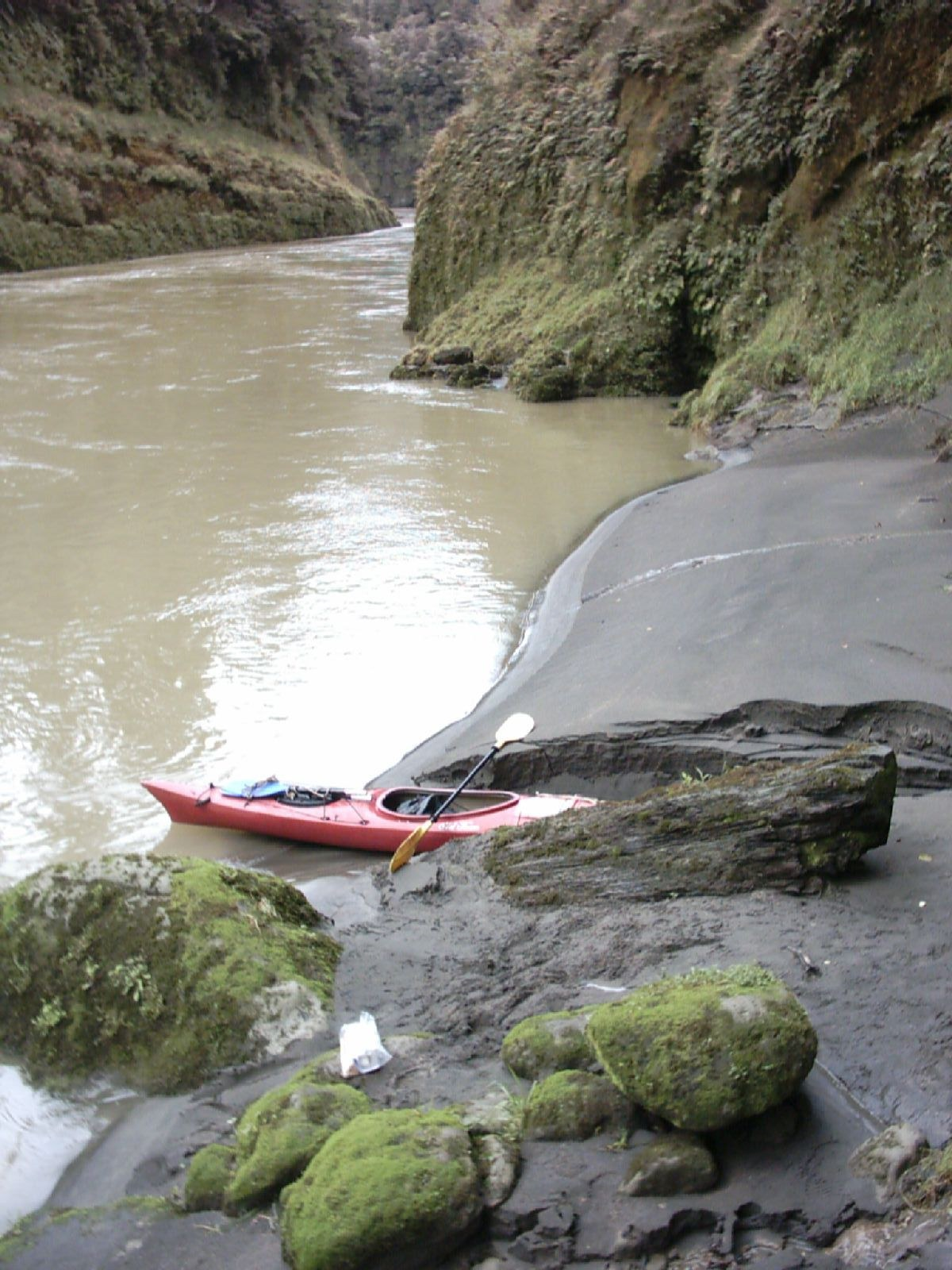
Kayaking is a very popular sport on the river.

The flow of the river has been altered with the diversion of water from the headwaters by the Tongariro Power Scheme and into Lake Taupō. This may have been a contributing factor to the demise of the raft race and means river boats can no longer make the entire trip to Taumarunui during the drier months (see below).

- Whanganui National Park
- The Whanganui Journey is managed by the Department of Conservation under its Great Walks programme.
- Hiking (north/south and east/west trails cross on the Whanganui River)
  - Te Araroa – The hiking trail the length of New Zealand and the Whanganui.
  - East Cape to Cape Egmont Traverse
  - Matemateāonga Range Tramping Trail (and others)
- Canoeing – many historic aspects and sites to visit.
- Annual Raft Race, Piriaka to Taumarunui – Last run in the 1970s
- Annual Jet Boat Race, Taumarunui to Wangaunui – Last run in the 1980s

== Bridges ==
Despite being New Zealand's longest navigable river, the Whanganui has few bridges. Only two are located on the 230-kilometre (140 mi) stretch between Whanganui and Taumarunui. The complete list of bridges in order from source to sea are:

- State Highway 47 Bridge near Tongariro National Park
- Te Pōrere Redoubts Walk crosses the river just downstream from
- The Western Diversion of the Tongariro Power Scheme crosses the river.
- A private forestry road near Lake Te Whaiau
- Hohotaka Road near Kakahi
- Taumarunui (x4) (including Victory Bridge)
- New Te Maire Bridge (1954)
- Jerusalem, derelict swing bridge.
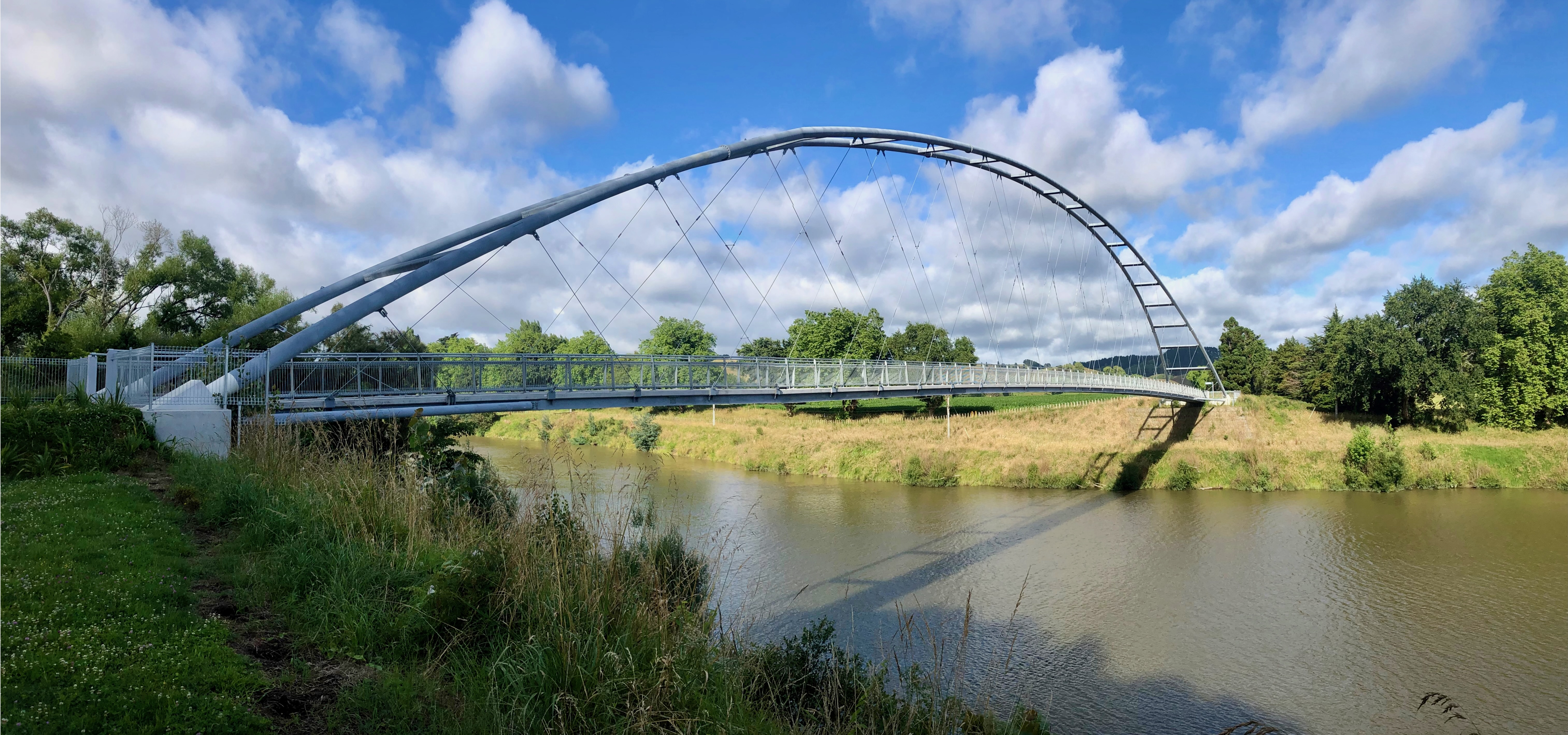
- Ūpokongaro cycle bridge
  The Mountains to Sea cycle trail (Ngā Ara Tūhono) crosses the river on Ūpokongaro Cycle Bridge, which opened on 2 December 2020. The 130 m (430 ft) long bridge and cycle path link to it cost $3.4m.

Whanganui –

- Dublin Street Bridge
- Whanganui City Bridge
- Cobham Bridge – 275 m (902 ft) long, 9 spans, designed 1959 by Ministry of Works, constructed 1962, abutments rest on raked prestressed concrete piles.

A bridge over the Whanganui to connect Raetihi to Taranaki was to be constructed in the Mangaparua area (where the Bridge to Nowhere) is located, but this plan was never implemented.

=== Rail bridges ===
The oldest bridges over the river are rail bridges; the Aramoho Rail Bridge of 1876 in Whanganui and the Matapuna Bridge of 1903-1904 near Taumarunui.

== Notable people ==
- Te Mamaku, Māori chief
- Alexander Hatrick, tourism leader
- John Tiffin Stewart, engineer
- Mary Joseph Aubert, Catholic mission
- James K. Baxter, poet
- Henry Augustus Field, surveyor
- Elsie Smith, 33 years ministering as a nurse and missionary
- Billy Webb, rower
- Andy Anderson, riverboat skipper, born in Pipiriki
