= Pipiriki =

Locality on Whanganui River

Coordinates: 39°29′S 175°03′E

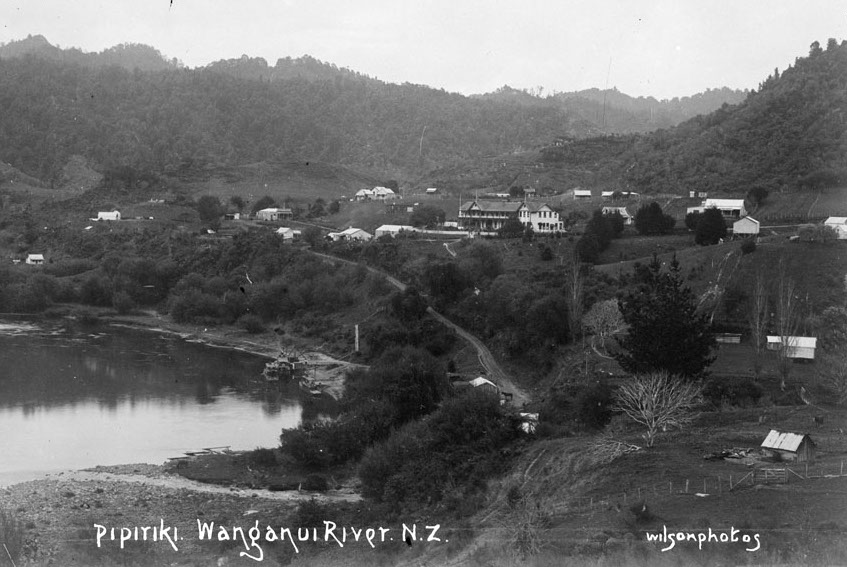
Taken in the early 20th century, this shows Pipiriki House, accommodation for the popular tourist excursion by riverboat from Whanganui.

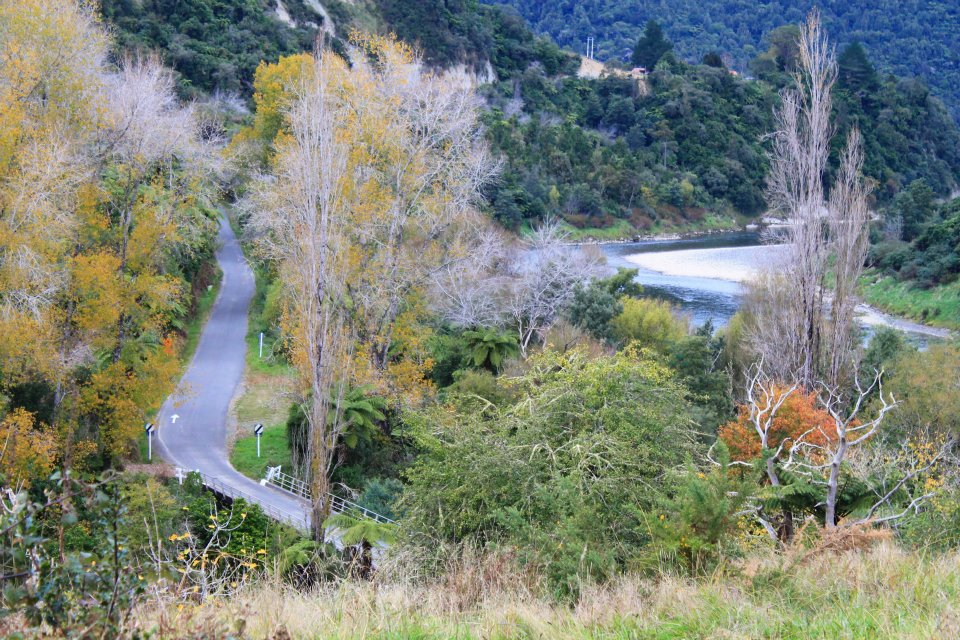
Pipiriki today

Pipiriki is a settlement in New Zealand, on the east bank of the Whanganui River, due west of the town of Raetihi and 79 kilometres (49 mi) upriver from Whanganui; it was originally on the opposite bank. It is the location of the Paraweka Marae of the hapū Ngāti Kurawhatia of the iwi [e Āti Haunui-a-Pāpārangi.

In the 1840s Pipiriki was a large stockaded settlement, the second largest on the Whanganui River, consisting of eight pā with a total population of 250–300. Wheat was a major crop from 1848 onward, and the water-powered Kaukore flour mill was built in 1854. In 1865 three redoubts across the river were besieged for several weeks by Pai Mārire warriors.

Pipiriki was an important part of the riverboat trade in the 1890s–1920s, marking a major stop for paddle steamers making the 11-hour journey from Whanganui.

There are four marae in the Pipiriki area affiliated with local iwi and hapū:

- Kirikiriroa Marae and Kirikiriroa meeting house are affiliated with the Ngāti Hāua hapū of Ngāti Ruru.
- Paraweka Marae and Pire Kiore meeting house are affiliated with Ngāti Kurawhatia.
- Te Poti Marae and Te Koanga Rehua meeting house and affiliated with Ngāti Tūhoro.
- Tawhata Marae and Te Hinau meeting house are affiliated with Ngāti Rangitengaue, Ngāti Tū, and the Ngāti Hāua hapū of Ngāti Rangitengaue and Ngāti Tū.

All are considered part of the Whanganui Māori.

== Notable people ==
- Andy Anderson, riverboat skipper
- Hōri Pukehika, tribal leader and carver, was born at Pipiriki in 1851
- Rumatiki Ruth Wright, Māori welfare officer and community leader
