= List of Christian organisations in New Zealand =

This is a list of Christian organisations in New Zealand.

== Denominations and churches ==
=== Catholic Denominations and Churches ===
- Roman Catholic Church in New Zealand
- Sisters of St Joseph of Nazareth

=== Orthodox Denominations and Churches ===
- Antiochian Orthodox Archdiocese of Australia, New Zealand, and All Oceania
- Coptic Orthodox Church in Australia and New Zealand
- Greek Orthodox Archdiocese of Australia and New Zealand

=== Protestant Denominations and Churches ===
==== Anglican Churches and Organisations ====
- Anglican Church in Aotearoa, New Zealand and Polynesia
- Church of Confessing Anglicans Aotearoa, New Zealand
- Anglican Catholic Church, Missionary Diocese of Australia & New Zealand

==== Baptist Churches and Organisations ====
- Baptist Union of New Zealand
- Reformed Baptists

==== Brethren Churches ====
- Christian Community Churches of New Zealand
- Plymouth Brethren Christian Church (formerly Exclusive Brethren)

==== Congregational Churches ====
- Congregational Union of New Zealand

==== Church of Christ Churches and Organisations ====
- Christian Churches NZ

==== Evangelical, Pentecostal and Non-Denominational Churches and Organisations (more than 2 Churches/Campuses) ====
- ACTS Churches NZ (formerly the Apostolic Church Movement of New Zealand)
- Alliance Churches of New Zealand (The Christian & Missionary Alliance of NZ)
- Arise Church New Zealand
- Assemblies of God in New Zealand
- C3 Churches NZ
- Church Unlimited
- City Impact Church New Zealand
- Elim Church of New Zealand
- Equippers Church
- Harmony Church, Christchurch
- Life Church
- Majestic Church
- New Life Churches, New Zealand
- Pentecostal Church of New Zealand
- Samoan Assemblies of God in New Zealand Incorporated
- Shalom Church Wellington, First Malayalam Pentecostal Church New Zealand
- Vineyard Churches Aotearoa New Zealand

==== Lutheran Churches and Organisations ====
- Lutheran church of New Zealand

Māori Churches

- Ratana
- Ringatu

==== Methodist Churches and Organisations ====
- Wesleyan Methodist Church in New Zealand
- Methodist Church of New Zealand
- Salvation Army in New Zealand
- Church of the Nazarene in New Zealand

Mixed Denominational Churches

- United Congregations of New Zealand

==== Presbyterian Churches and Organisations ====
- Grace Presbyterian Church of New Zealand
- Orthodox Presbyterian Church of New Zealand
- Presbyterian Church of Aotearoa New Zealand

==== Reformed and Calvinist Churches and Organisations ====
- Reformed Churches of New Zealand

==== Seventh Day Adventists ====
- Seventh Day Adventists

=== Anabaptist Denominations ===
- Anabaptist Association of Australia and New Zealand

== Ecumenical organisations ==
- Bible Society New Zealand
- Christian World Service
- Churches Education Commission
- Church Women United
- Combined Churches of Aotearoa New Zealand
- Fellowship of the Least Coin
- Interchurch Hospital Chaplaincy Council
- Student Christian Movement
- Te Runanga Whakawhanaunga I nga Haahi
- Uniting Congregations of Aotearoa New Zealand
- National Dialogue for Christian Unity
- Wellington Christian Feminists (1977–1990)

== Parachurch organisations ==
Parachurch organizations are Christian faith-based organizations that work outside and across denominations to engage in social welfare and evangelism. Parachurch organizations seek to come alongside the church and specialize in things that individual churches may not be able to specialize in by themselves.

=== Youth ===
- Eastercamp, South Island
- Scripture Union New Zealand

=== University Ministry ===
- Engage Church
- Student Life New Zealand
- Tertiary Students Christian Fellowship

=== Media ===
- Rhema Media
- Christian Broadcasting Association
- Word of Life Ministries
- Parachute Music
- Churches of NZ Project to capture and document all the Churches of New Zealand

=== Charity and Social Work ===
- Caritas Aotearoa New Zealand, a member of Caritas Oceania
- Celebrate Messiah New Zealand, a Messianic Jewish organisation
- Derek Prince Ministries NZ, bible study group inspired by Derek Prince
- Focus on the Family New Zealand
- God Talk, organisation promoting youth ministry
- Hagar New Zealand
- International Needs New Zealand, non-denominational Christian mission and international aid organisation founded in New Zealand
- Liberty Trust, an organisation opposed to interest and debt
- MMM New Zealand, volunteer organisation constructing Christian buildings
- Shining Lights, a strategic resourcing ministry
- Society of St Pius X in New Zealand
- TEAR Fund NZ
- World Vision New Zealand
- Voice of the Martyrs New Zealand

== Social service organisations ==
- Baptist Community Ministries
- Catholic Social Services
- Canterbury Youth Services
- Christchurch City Mission
- Methodist Social Services
- New Zealand Council of Christian Social Services
- Presbyterian Support
- Wesley Community Action
- 24-7 YouthWork Trust

== Educational organisations ==
=== Theological and Bible Colleges ===
==== Denominational ====
- Arise Church Ministry School
- Alphacrucis (Assemblies of God)
- Bishopdale Theological College (Anglican)
- Booth College of Mission (Salvation Army)
- Catholic Institute of Theology
- Carey Baptist College
- Equippers College (ACTS Churches NZ)
- Good Shepherd College (Catholic)
- Holy Cross Seminary (Catholic)
- Holy Name Seminary (Catholic) (closed)
- Knox Centre for Ministry and Leadership (Presbyterian)
- Marist Seminary (Catholic)
- Ministry Training College of New Zealand (Elim)
- Pathways College of Bible & Mission
- St John's College, Auckland (Anglican)
- St Mary's Seminary (Catholic) (1850-1869)
- South Pacific Bible College (Church of Christ)
- Theology House Christchurch (Anglican)
- Trinity Methodist Theological College
- Vision College New Zealand (ACTS Churches NZ)

==== Ecumenical ====
- Ecumenical Institute of Distance Theological Studies

==== Non-denominational ====
- Calvary Chapel Bible Institute
- Capernwray New Zealand
- Faith Bible College
- Grace Theological College
- Gospel Training Trust
- Laidlaw College
- Lifeway College
- New Covenant International Bible College
- The Shepherd's Bible College
- Theology Programme, University of Otago
- World Gospel Bible College

== Primary and secondary schools ==
=== Catholic Church ===
==== Primary schools ====
- 190 Catholic primary schools

==== Secondary schools ====
- Aquinas College
- Baradene College of the Sacred Heart
- Bishop Viard College
- Campion College
- Carmel College
- Catholic Cathedral College
- Chanel College
- Cullinane College
- De La Salle College
- Francis Douglas Memorial College
- Garin College
- Hato Paora College
- Hato Petera College
- John Paul College
- John Paul II High School
- Kavanagh College
- Liston College
- Marcellin College
- Marian College
- Marist College
- McAuley High School
- Pompallier Catholic College
- Roncalli College
- Rosmini College
- Sacred Heart College, Auckland
- Sacred Heart College, Napier
- Sacred Heart Girls' College, Hamilton
- Sacred Heart College, Lower Hutt
- Sacred Heart Girls' College, New Plymouth
- St Bede's College
- St Bernard's College
- St Catherine's College
- St Dominic's College
- St John's College, Hamilton
- St John's College, Hastings
- St Joseph's Māori Girls' College
- St Kevin's College
- St Mary's College, Auckland
- St Mary's College, Wellington
- St. Patrick's College, Silverstream
- St. Patrick's College, Wellington
- St Paul's College
- St Peter's College, Auckland
- St Peter's College, Palmerston North
- St Peter's College, Gore
- St Thomas of Canterbury College
- Sancta Maria College
- Verdon College
- Villa Maria College

=== Anglican ===
==== Primary schools ====
- Cathedral Grammar School
- Chilton St. James, Lower Hutt
- King's School (Auckland)
- Medbury School, Christchurch
- St. John's School, Invercargill
- St. Mark's School, Christchurch
- St. Mark's School, Wellington
- St. Matthew's School, Hastings
- St Michael's Church School
- Selwyn House, Christchurch
- Southwell School

==== Secondary schools ====
- Christ's College, Christchurch
- Craighead Diocesan School, Timaru
- Dilworth School, Auckland
- Diocesan School for Girls, Auckland
- Hukarere Girls' College
- King's College, Auckland
- Nga Tawa Diocesan School
- Rathkeale College
- St. Hilda's Collegiate, Dunedin
- St. Margaret's College, Christchurch
- St. Matthew's Collegiate, Masterton
- St Paul's Collegiate School
- St. Peter's College, Cambridge
- Samuel Marsden Collegiate School
- Taranaki Diocesan School for Girls, Stratford
- Te Aute College, Hawke's Bay
- Waikato Diocesan School
- Wellesley College, Eastbourne
- Woodford House, Havelock North

=== Methodist ===
- Wesley College, Auckland

=== Non-denominational ===
- Bethlehem College, Tauranga
- Elim Christian College
- Faith Academy (New Zealand)
- Hastings Christian School, Hastings, New Zealand
- Hamilton Christian School, Hamilton
- Hebron Christian College, Auckland
- Immanuel Christian School, New Zealand
- Middleton Grange School
- St. Dominic's College, Wanganui

=== Presbyterian ===
- Columba College, Dunedin
- Iona College, Havelock North
- John McGlashan College, Dunedin
- Queen Margaret College, Wellington
- St Andrew's College, Christchurch
- St Cuthbert's College, Auckland
- Saint Kentigern College, Pakuranga, Auckland
- Saint Oran's College, Lower Hutt
- Scots College, Wellington
- Solway College, Girls Boarding School, Masterton

== See also ==
- Christianity in New Zealand
