= Religion in New Zealand =

Religion in New Zealand (2023)
1. No religion (51.6%)
2. Christianity (32.3%)
3. Hinduism (2.90%)
4. Islam (1.50%)
5. Māori Indigenous (1.30%)
6. Buddhism (1.10%)
7. Sikhism (1.10%)
8. Judaism (0.10%)
9. Other Religions (1.20%)
10. Religion not stated (6.90%)

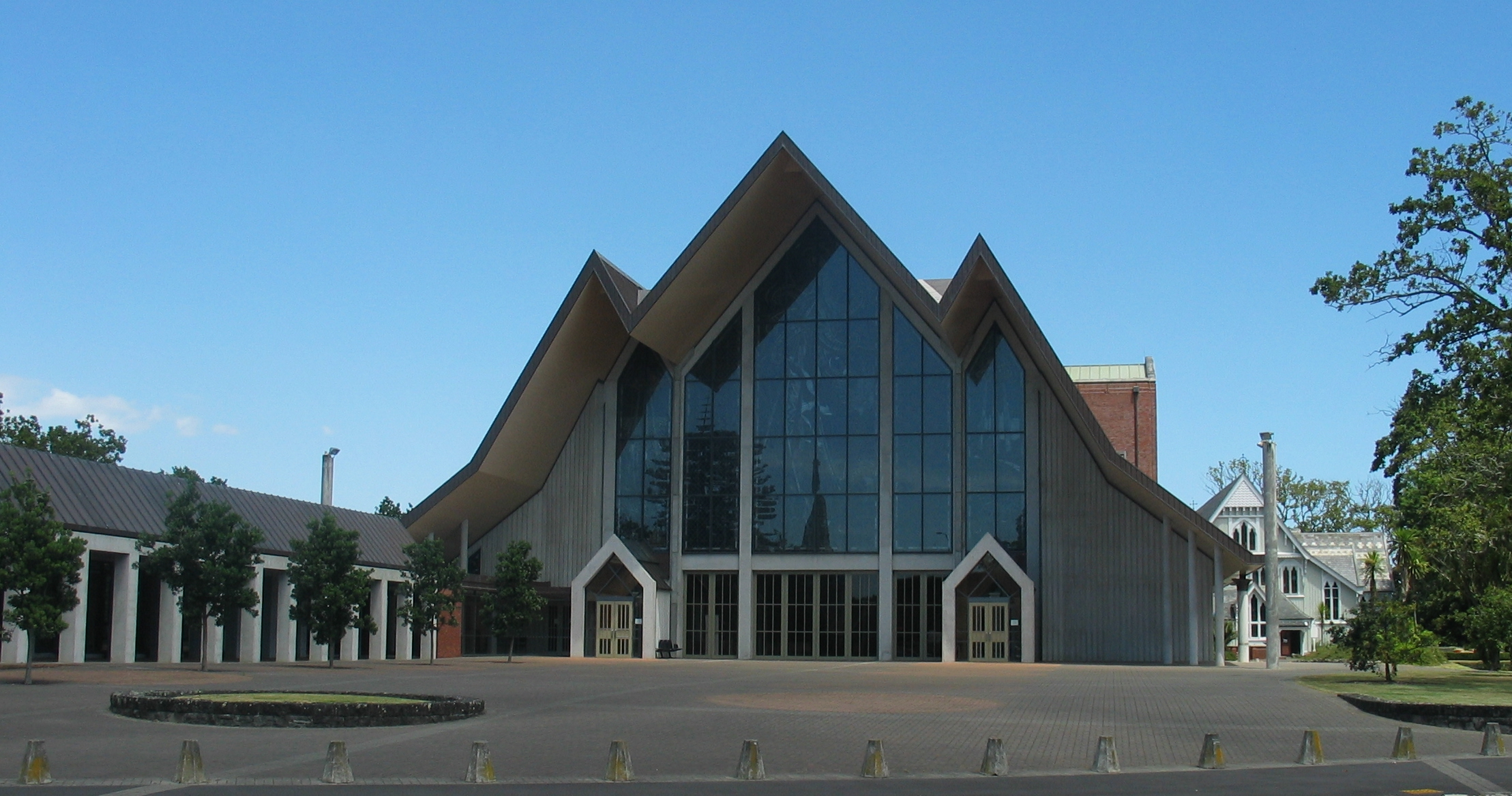
Holy Trinity Anglican Cathedral in Auckland

Religion in New Zealand is diverse. The country has no state religion and freedom of religion has been protected since the signing of the Treaty of Waitangi.

New Zealand was predominantly Christian from the mid 1800s, but since 2000 has become post-Christian. In the 2023 census 51.6 per cent of New Zealanders stated they had no religion and another 6.9 percent did not state a religion. In the 2023 census 32.3% of the population identified as Christian, making up just over 77.5% of religious people in New Zealand. Other major religions include Hinduism (2.9%), Islam (1.5%), Māori religion (1.3%), Buddhism (1.1%), and Sikhism (1.1%).

== Overview ==
The religion of Māori people before European colonisation has been described as polytheistic and animistic. Efforts of Christian missionaries and their churches resulted in most Māori converting to Christianity, though with the development of some significant, distinctly Māori churches or denominations such as the Te Nakahi and Pai Mārire 'movements,' and the Ringatū and Rātana churches. In the 1840s, it is probable that a larger proportion of Māori regularly attended church services than people did in the United Kingdom.

With the vast majority of 19th-century European immigrants coming from the British Isles, three Christian denominations predominated post-colonial New Zealand: Anglicanism, Catholicism and Presbyterianism. The tendency for Scottish immigrants to settle in Otago and Southland saw Presbyterianism predominate in these regions while Anglicanism predominated elsewhere; the effect of this is still seen in religious affiliation statistics today (see the map below).

Immigration since 1991 has led to slight yet steady growth in the number of adherents of south and south-east Asian religions such as Hinduism, Buddhism and Sikhism, particularly in Auckland. The number and proportion of people affiliating with non-Christian religions has increased to around nine per cent of the population. Hinduism is the second-most popular religion with 2.9 per cent of the population. Sikhism is the fastest-growing faith. While the number and proportion who identify as Christians has fallen in recent years, Sikhism (+31%), Islam (+22%) and Hinduism (+17%) were the fastest growing religions over the 2018-2023 period, fuelled by immigration to New Zealand from Asia.

In addition, there are adherents of many new religious movements like Spiritualism, Theosophy, Druidry, New Age and the Goddess movement branches.

== Demographics ==
=== Religious affiliation ===
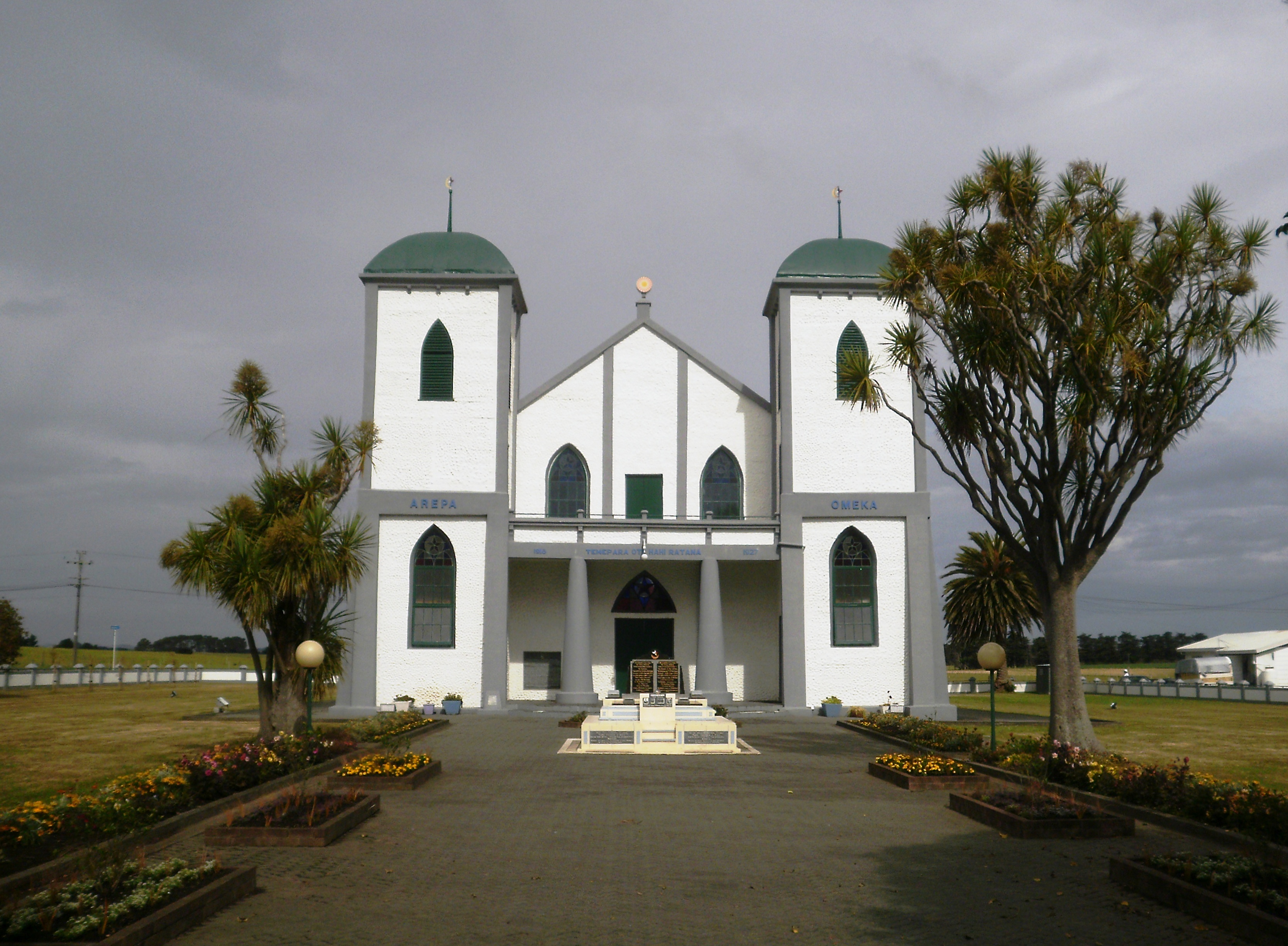
A Rātana temple in Rātana Pā. The Rātana movement is a Māori church.

New Zealand censuses have collected data on religious affiliation since 1851. Statistics New Zealand (the state agency that collects statistics on religion and other demographics) state that:

Religious affiliation is a variable of strong interest to religious organisations, social scientists, and can be used as an explanatory variable in studies on topics such as marriage formation and dissolution, fertility and income.

One complication in interpreting religious affiliation data in New Zealand is the large proportion who do not answer the question—roughly 313,000 respondents in 2018. Most reporting of percentages is based on the total number of responses, rather than the total population.

In the early 20th century, New Zealand census data indicates that the vast majority of New Zealanders affiliated with Christianity. The total percentages in the 1921 non-Māori census were: 45% Anglicans, 19.9% Presbyterians, 13.6% Catholics, 9.5% Methodists and 11.2% Others. Statistics for Māori in particular became available only from 1936, with 35.8% Anglicans, 19.9% Rātana, 13.9% Catholics, 7.2% Ringatū, 7.1% Methodists, 6.5% Latter-day Saints, 1.3% Methodists and 8.3% others recorded at this census.

==== Religious affiliation statistics ====
The table below is based on religious affiliation data recorded at the last four censuses for usually resident people. Figures and percentages may not add to 100 per cent as it is possible for people to state more than one religion. The trend indicators are based on the change in percentage of the population, not the number of adherents.

The 2018 census had an unusually low (83%) response rate. Statistics New Zealand subsequently calculated the 2018 census statistics based on the combination of 2018 census responses (82.9%), 2013 census responses (8.2%) and imputation (8.8%). The reported results are deemed to be high quality, but are not completely reliable.

Religion	2023 census		2018 census (Note: Data from the 2018 Census is not entirely reliable. An independent inquiry carried out in August 2019 regarding the 2018 census criticised the Chief Statistician Liz MacPherson's decision to conduct the census solely online as the census attracted only an 83% response rate, even lower than the 90% earlier reported. This drop, which amounted to the lowest census response rate for fifty years, has been blamed on a 'digital-first' policy, which excluded rural and older demographics. In response to the report, MacPherson resigned as chief statistician on 13 August 2019.)		2013 census (Note: The 2011 census was cancelled due to the 2011 Christchurch earthquake; the 2013 census replaced it.)		2006 census		2001 census		Trend (%)
Religion	Number	%	Number	%	Number	%	Number	%	Number	%	2001–18
Christian	1,620,555	32.45%	1,738,638	37.31	1,858,977	47.65	2,027,418	54.16	2,043,843	58.92	▼
Christian (not further defined)	364,644	7.3%	307,926	6.61	216,177	5.54	186,234	4.97	192,165	5.54	▲
Roman Catholic (Note: In the 2018 census, responses indicating 'Catholicism (nfd)' increased significantly, and this in part accounts for the large notional decline in the number of Roman Catholics.)	289,788	5.8%	295,743	6.2	492,105	12.61	508,437	13.58	485,637	14.00	▼
Anglican	245,301	4.91%	314,913	6.76	459,771	11.79	554,925	14.82	584,793	16.86	▼
Presbyterian, Congregational and Reformed	202,329	4.05%	242,907	5.21	330,516	8.47	400,839	10.71	431,139	12.43	▼
Catholicism (not further defined)	155,916	3.12%	173,016	3.71	N/A	N/A	N/A	N/A	N/A	N/A	▼
Pentecostal	66,213	1.33%	81,624	1.75	74,256	1.90	79,155	2.11	67,182	1.94	▼
Methodist	62,766	1.26%	72,747	1.56	102,879	2.64	121,806	3.25	120,546	3.48	▼
Latter-day Saints	54,348	1.09%	54,123	1.16	40,728	1.04	43,539	1.16	39,915	1.15	Steady
Baptist	31,734	0.64%	39,030	0.84	54,345	1.39	56,913	1.52	51,423	1.48	▼
Evangelical, Born Again and Fundamentalist	33,942	0.68%	38,127	0.82	15,381	0.39	13,836	0.37	11,016	0.32	▲
Jehovah's Witnesses	18,471	0.37%	20,061	0.43	17,931	0.46	17,910	0.48	17,829	0.51	▼
Adventist	18,204	0.36%	18,510	0.40	17,085	0.44	16,191	0.43	14,868	0.43	Steady
Brethren	12,363	0.25%	14,160	0.30	18,624	0.48	19,617	0.52	20,397	0.59	▼
Orthodox	13,785	0.28%	13,866	0.30	13,806	0.35	13,194	0.35	9,576	0.28	Steady
Asian Christian	10,329	0.21%	10,203	0.22	132	<0.01	195	0.01	195	0.01	▲
Protestant (not further defined)	7,830	0.16%	8,544	0.18	4,998	0.13	3,954	0.11	2,787	0.08	▲
Salvation Army	6,048	0.12%	7,929	0.17	9,162	0.23	11,493	0.31	12,618	0.36	▼
Uniting/Union Church and Ecumenical	2,511	0.05%	3,693	0.08	999	0.03	1,419	0.04	1,389	0.04	Steady
Lutheran	2,859	0.06%	3,585	0.08	3,903	0.10	4,476	0.12	4,314	0.12	Steady
Church of Christ and Associated Churches of Christ	4,203	0.08%	3,258	0.07	2,145	0.05	2,991	0.08	3,270	0.09	Steady
Other Christian	11,946	0.24%	14,673	0.31	3,714	0.10	3,798	0.10	3,558	0.10	▲
Hinduism/Hindu	144,771	2.9%	123,534	2.65	89,319	2.11	64,392	1.72	39,798	1.15	▲
Māori religions, beliefs and philosophies (Note: The 2018 census replaced "Māori Religion" and "Māori Christian" with "Māori Religions, Beliefs and Philosophies".)	66,051	1.32%	62,634	1.34	52,947	1.36	65,550	1.75	63,597	1.83	▼
Rātana	43,944	0.88%	43,821	0.94	40,353	1.03	50,565	1.35	48,975	1.41	▼
Ringatū	11,985	0.24%	12,336	0.26	13,272	0.34	16,419	0.44	15,291	0.44	▼
Māori religions (not further defined)	6,531	0.13%	3,699	0.08	N/A	N/A	N/A	N/A	N/A	N/A	▲
Pai Mārire	1,383	0.03%	1,194	0.03	N/A	N/A	N/A	N/A	N/A	N/A	Steady
Other Māori religions, beliefs and philosophies	2,208	0.04%	1,584	0.03	N/A	N/A	N/A	N/A	N/A	N/A	Steady
Māori Christian (not further defined)	N/A	N/A	N/A	N/A	222	0.01	219	0.01	237	0.01	Steady
Other Māori Christian	N/A	N/A	N/A	N/A	333	0.01	360	0.01	426	0.01	Steady
Māori Religion	N/A	N/A	N/A	N/A	2,595	0.07	2,412	0.06	1,995	0.06	▼
Islam/Muslim	75,144	1.5%	61,455	1.32	46,149	1.18	36,072	0.96	23,631	0.68	▲
Buddhism/Buddhist	57,135	1.14%	52,779	1.13	58,404	1.50	52,362	1.40	41,634	1.20	▼
Sikhism/Sikh	53,406	1.07%	40,908	0.88	19,191	0.49	9,507	0.25	5,199	0.15	▲
Spiritualism and New Age religions	22,623	0.45%	19,695	0.42	18,285	0.47	19,800	0.53	16,062	0.46	Steady
Spiritualist	8,628	0.17%	8,262	0.18	7,776	0.20	7,743	0.21	5,856	0.17	Steady
Nature and Earth based religions	7,986	0.16%	6,582	0.14	5,943	0.15	7,125	0.19	5,838	0.17	Steady
Satanism	1,593	0.03%	1,149	0.02	840	0.02	1,164	0.03	894	0.03	Steady
New Age (not further defined)	255	0.01%	363	0.01	441	0.01	669	0.02	420	0.01	Steady
Church of Scientology	315	0.01%	321	0.01	318	0.01	357	0.01	282	0.01	Steady
Other New Age religions	2,763	0.06%	3,018	0.06	3,015	0.08	2,871	0.08	2,784	0.08	Steady
Judaism/Jewish	5,538	0.11%	5,274	0.11	6,867	0.18	6,858	0.18	6,636	0.19	▼
Other religions	11,715	0.23%	11,079	0.24	15,054	0.39	14,943	0.40	13,581	0.39	▼
Baháʼí	3,072	0.06%	2,925	0.06	2,634	0.07	2,772	0.07	2,988	0.09	Steady
Theism	3,066	0.06%	2,607	0.06	1,782	0.05	2,202	0.06	1,491	0.04	Steady
Chinese religions	1,695	0.03%	1,491	0.03	906	0.02	912	0.02	1,269	0.04	Steady
Other religion (not further defined)	1,083	0.02%	1,434	0.03	5,202	0.13	4,830	0.13	4,641	0.13	▼
Zoroastrian	1,020	0.02%	1,068	0.02	972	0.02	1,071	0.03	486	0.01	Steady
Jainism	813	0.02%	612	0.01	207	0.01	111	<0.01	57	<0.01	Steady
Japanese religions	597	0.01%	588	0.01	423	0.01	384	0.01	303	0.01	Steady
Other religions	369	0.01%	354	0.01	333	0.01	258	0.01	351	0.01	Steady
Total people with at least one religious affiliation	2,091,939	41.89%	2,083,107	44.70	2,146,167	53.64	2,271,921	60.69	2,232,564	64.36	▼
No religion	2,576,049	51.58%	2,264,601	48.59	1,635,345	41.92	1,297,104	34.65	1,028,049	29.64	▲
Object to answering	342,705	6.86%	312,795	6.71	173,034	4.44	242,607	6.48	239,241	6.90	▲
Total people stated	4,993,923	100.0	4,660,503	100.0	3,901,167	100.00	3,743,655	100.00	3,468,813	100.00	
Not elsewhere included (Note: Includes Jedi, Pastafarianism, Atheism, Agnosticism, religion unidentifiable, response outside scope, and not stated.)	36,084		39,252		347,301		292,974		287,376		
Total population	5,090,715		4,699,755		4,242,048		4,027,947		3,737,277		

=== Significant trends ===
Religious affiliations of New Zealanders 1996 to 2023

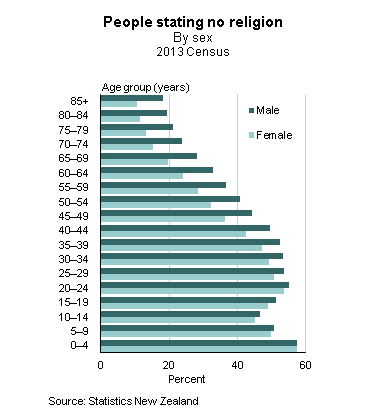
Irreligion in New Zealand is highest among males and younger generations; with the exception of the 10–14 age bracket, the majority of New Zealanders under 35 are irreligious.

Christianity—historically the largest religious group since significant European colonisation began in the early 1800s—is declining, while stating no religion and affiliation to other (minority) religions is increasing. Statistics New Zealand report that about 80% of the largest non-Christian religious groups are composed of immigrants, almost half of whom have arrived in New Zealand since 2000. The exceptions to this are traditional Māori religion, Judaism (24% immigrant) and Bahá'í (20% immigrant). Mirroring contemporary trends in immigration to New Zealand, immigrant religions increased fastest between the 2006 and 2013 censuses; Sikh by 102% to 19,191, Hindu by 39% to 89,319, Islam by 28% to 46,149, and Buddhist by 11% to 58,404. Hinduism emerged as the second-largest religious group in New Zealand after Christianity in the 2006 census. Of the major ethnic groups in New Zealand, people belonging to European and Māori ethnicities were the most likely to be irreligious, with 46.9 per cent and 46.3 per cent stating so in the 2013 census. Those belonging to Pacific and Middle Eastern/Latin American/African were least likely to be irreligious at 17.5 per cent and 17.0 per cent respectively.

In May 2018, McCrindle published The Faith and Belief in New Zealand Report. The report was commissioned by the Wilberforce Foundation. The results showed that more than half of New Zealanders (55%) do not identify with any main religion, indicating that New Zealand is a largely secular nation. The related infographic showed that, of the 33% who identified with Christianity, 16% were church-goers (attending at least monthly) and 9% were "Active Practisers" (described as "extremely involved").

=== Regional trends ===
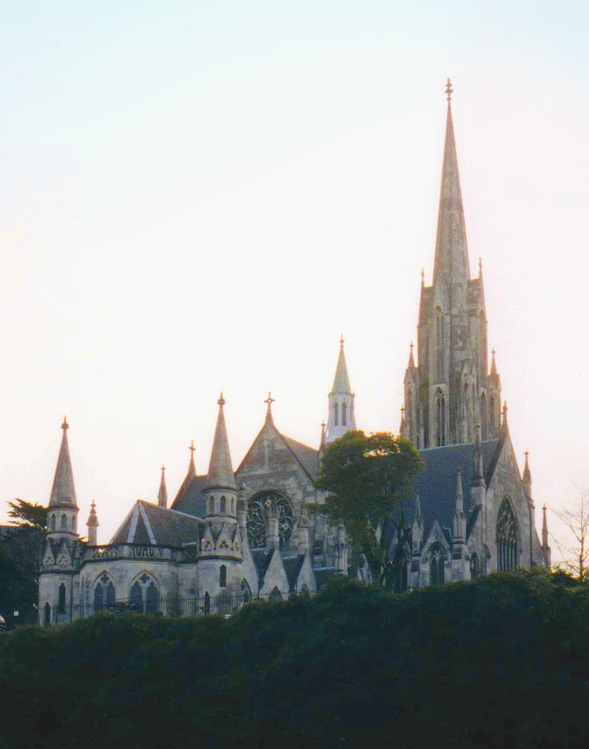
First Church of Otago, a Presbyterian church in Dunedin. The Otago region was historically dominated by Presbyterianism because it was settled by Scots.

Dominant Christian denominations in each territorial authority, 2023 census.

Immigration and settlement trends have led to religious differences between the various regions of New Zealand. The 19th-century settlement of Scottish immigrants in Otago (originally under the auspices of the Free Church of Scotland in 1848) and Southland continues to influence the dominance of Presbyterianism in the south of the South Island. The English mainly settled in the North Island and Upper South Island, hence the dominance of Anglicanism in these areas (especially Canterbury, where the Church of England sponsored the 1850 settlement through the Canterbury Association).

Subsequent migration trends have led to clusters of distinct religious practice. Catholics of Polish origin (many connected with the re-settlements from Siberia in 1944) have a presence (for example) in the Wellington region. Filipinos have become a noticeable element in the Roman Catholic communities of Southland.

Dominant Christian denominations in each territorial authority, 2013 census. The Chatham Islands have roughly equal numbers of Anglicans and Catholics.

In the 2013 census, two of New Zealand's sixteen regions had a Christian majority: Southland (51.9 per cent) and Hawke's Bay (50.5 per cent), and two regions had a non-religious majority: Tasman (51.4 per cent) and Nelson (51.0 per cent).

Christian denominations by region, 2013 census
Region	Anglican		Catholic		Presbyterian	
Region	Num.	%	Num.	%	Num.	%
Northland	19,836	14.7	3,743	10.2	7,293	5.4
Auckland	117,843	9.1	172,110	13.3	95,889	7.4
Waikato	45,687	12.3	41,148	11.1	27,885	7.5
Bay of Plenty	31,674	13.0	26,817	11.0	19,938	8.2
Gisborne	7,998	20.5	3,195	8.2	2,523	6.5
Hawke's Bay	22,800	16.5	15,729	11.4	12,879	9.3
Taranaki	13,584	13.5	15,654	15.5	7,815	7.7
Manawatū-Whanganui	29,190	14.2	25,719	12.5	16,269	7.9
Wellington	51,819	11.9	64,497	14.8	30,222	6.9
Tasman	6,147	13.9	3,261	7.4	2,622	5.9
Nelson	5,763	13.3	3,885	9.0	2,484	5.7
Marlborough	7,182	17.8	4,536	11.2	3,561	8.8
West Coast	4,101	14.0	4,929	16.8	1,941	6.6
Canterbury	74,277	14.8	63,858	12.7	48,378	9.6
Otago	15,741	8.4	21,492	11.5	31,998	17.1
Southland	6,015	6.9	11,421	13.1	18,804	21.6
New Zealand total	459,771	11.8	492,105	12.6	330,516	8.5

=== Jedi census phenomenon ===
Encouraged by an informal email campaign prior to the 2001 census, over 53,000 people listed themselves as Jedi (over 1.5% of responses). If the Jedi response had been accepted as valid it would have then been the second-largest religion in New Zealand, behind Christianity. However, Statistics New Zealand treated Jedi responses as "Answer understood, but will not be counted". In the next census, in 2006, the number of reported Jedis decreased to 20,000.

== Religions ==
=== Christianity ===
The first Christian services conducted in New Zealand waters were probably Catholic liturgies celebrated by Father Paul-Antoine Léonard de Villefeix, the Dominican chaplain of the ship Saint Jean Baptiste commanded by the French navigator and explorer Jean-François-Marie de Surville. Villefeix was the first Christian clergyman to set foot in New Zealand, and probably said Mass on board the ship near Whatuwhiwhi in Doubtless Bay on Christmas Day in 1769. He is also reported to have led prayers for the sick the previous day and to have conducted Christian burials.

The Reverend Samuel Marsden of the Anglican Church Missionary Society (the CMS) then chaplain in New South Wales conducted the first Christian service on New Zealand land on Christmas Day in 1814, at Oihi Bay, a small cove in Rangihoua Bay in the Bay of Islands, at the invitation of chiefs Te Pahi and Ruatara. Marsden, at that time serving as chaplain in New South Wales, performed the first recorded preaching of the gospel in New Zealand.

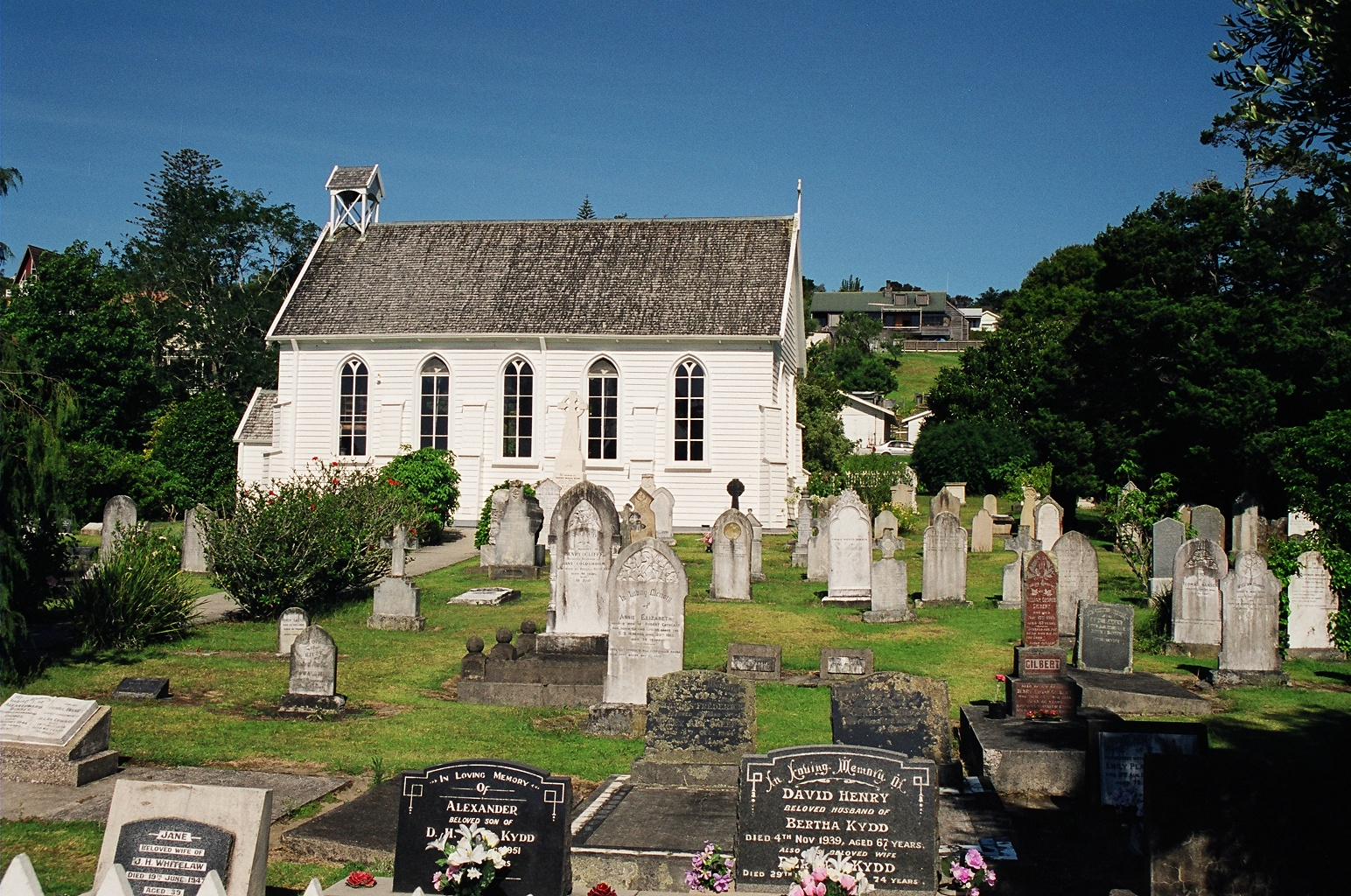
Christ Church in Russell, built in 1835, is one of the oldest church buildings in New Zealand.

The CMS sent missionaries to settle in New Zealand, founding its first mission at Rangihoua Bay in 1814–1815, and over the next decade established farms and schools in the area. In June 1823 Wesleydale, the first Wesleyan Methodist mission in New Zealand, started at Kaeo, near Whangaroa Harbour.

Church Missionary Society printer/missionary William Colenso's 1837 Māori New Testament became the first indigenous-language translation of the Bible published in the southern hemisphere. Demand for the Māori New Testament, and for the Prayer Book that followed, grew exponentially, as did Christian Māori leadership and public Christian services, with 33,000 Māori attending regularly. Literacy and understanding the Bible increased mana and social and economic benefits, decreased the practices of slavery and intertribal violence, and increased peace and respect for all people in Māori society, including women.

Jean Baptiste Pompallier was the first Catholic bishop to come to New Zealand, arriving in 1838. With a number of Marist Brothers, Pompallier organised the Catholic Church throughout the country.

Although in England the Anglican Church was an established state church, by the middle of the 19th century even the Anglicans themselves sometimes doubted this arrangement, while the other major denominations of the new colony (Presbyterians, Methodist and Catholics, for example) obviously preferred that the local situation allowed for all their groups. George Augustus Selwyn became the first Anglican Bishop of New Zealand in 1841. In 1892 the New Zealand Church Missionary Society (NZCMS) formed in a Nelson church hall and the first New Zealand missionaries were sent overseas soon after.

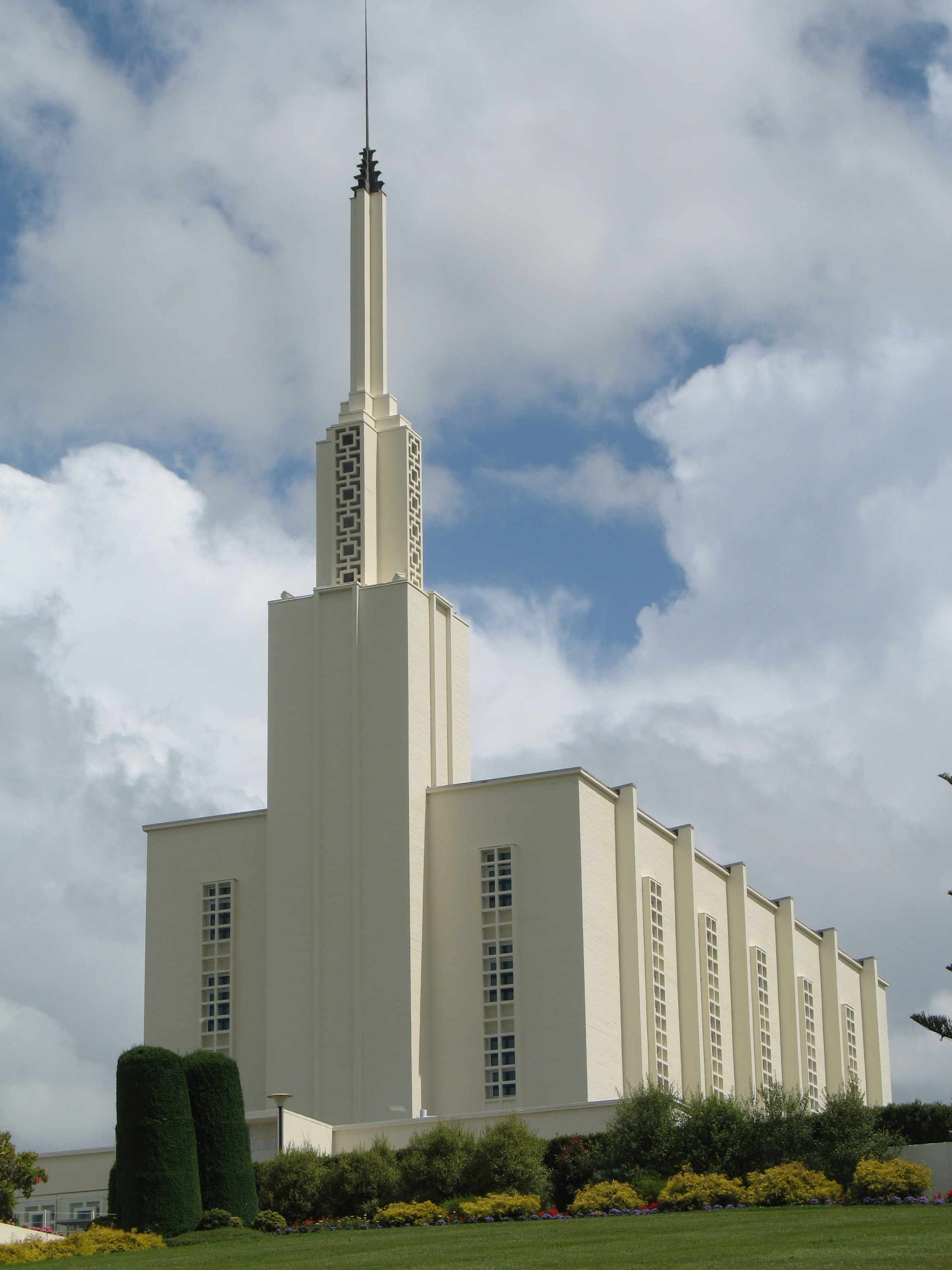
The Hamilton New Zealand Temple of the Church of Jesus Christ of Latter-day Saints

Waves of new immigrants brought their particular (usually Christian) faiths with them. Initial denominational distribution very much reflected the fact that local immigrant communities started small and often came from comparatively small regions in the origin-countries in Great Britain. As a result, by the time of the 1921 census, no uniform distribution existed amongst non-Māori Christians, with Presbyterians as the dominant group in Otago and Southland; Anglicans in the Far North, the East Cape and various other areas including Banks Peninsula; while Methodists flourished mainly in Taranaki and the Manawatū; and Catholicism was the dominant religion on the West Coast with its many mining concerns, and in Central Otago. The Catholic Church, while not particularly dominant in terms of proportional numbers, became more prominent throughout the country in the early- and middle-20th century through establishing many schools in that period.

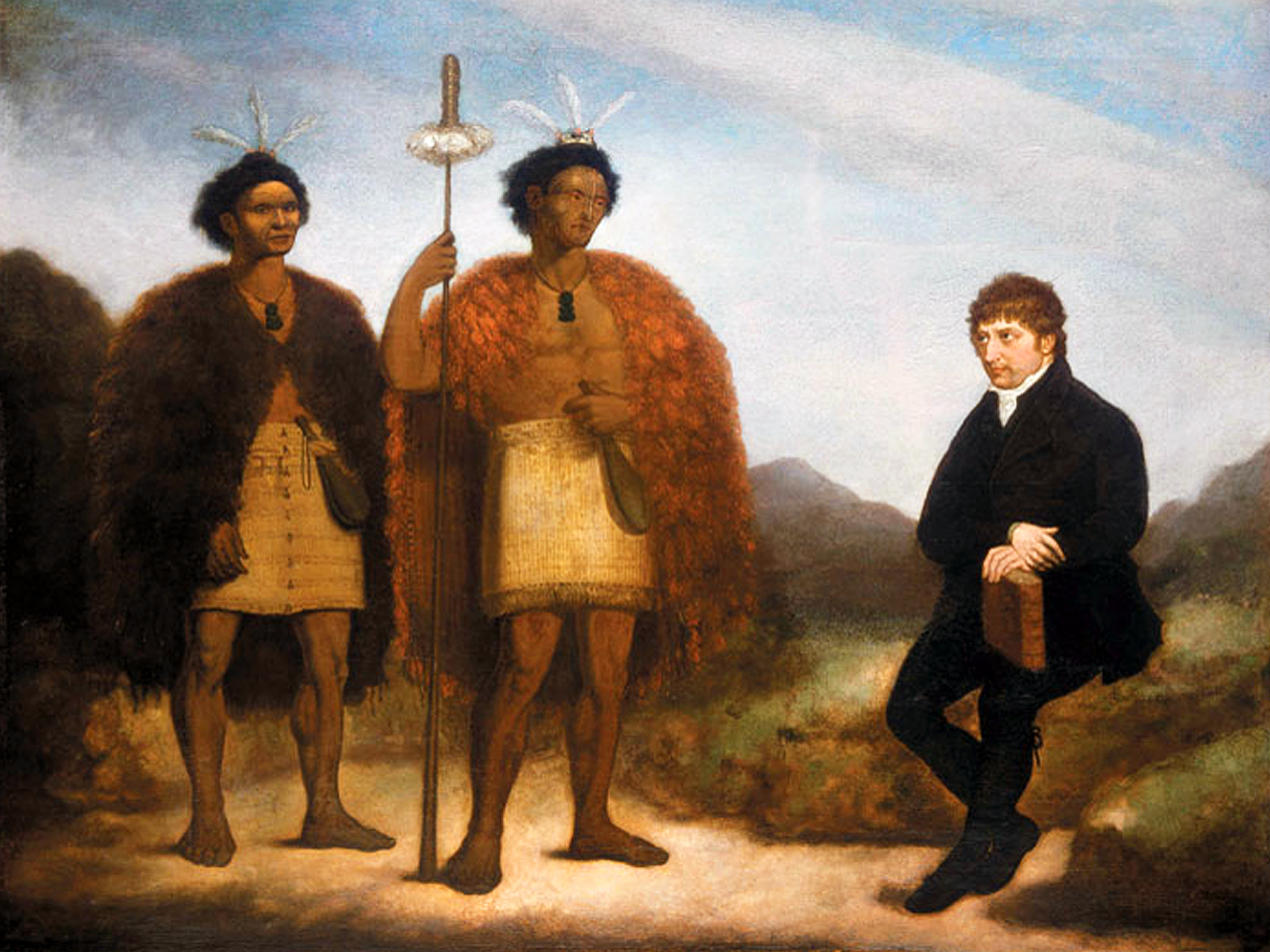
This 1820 painting shows Ngāpuhi chiefs Waikato (left) and Hongi Hika, and Anglican missionary Thomas Kendall.

Beginning in the mid-1960s church membership and attendance started declining in percentage terms, mostly due to people declaring themselves as having no religion as well as due to growth of non-Christian religions. The five largest Christian denominations in 2001 remained the largest in 2006. However, despite fairly strong historical affiliation of New Zealanders to Christianity since colonisation, church attendance in New Zealand has not been as high as in other Western nations.

The Anglican, Presbyterian, Congregational and Reformed denominations, and undefined Christian denominations decreased; yet the Catholic and Methodist denominations increased, as did some other Christian denominations between 2001 and 2006: Orthodox Christian religions increased by 37.8 per cent; affiliation with Evangelical, Born Again and Fundamentalist religions increased by 25.6 per cent, and affiliation with Pentecostal religions increased by 17.8 per cent.

Research by the Bible Society of New Zealand in 2008 indicated that 15% of New Zealanders attend church at least once a week, and 20% attend at least once a month. In 2013 42% of the population said they had no religion.

According to the 2018 census, 10.1% identified as Catholic or Roman Catholic, 6.8% are Anglican, 6.6% are Undefined Christian, 5.2% are Presbyterian, 1.3% are Māori Christian, and 8.6% reported affiliation to other Christian groups.

According to a 2019 survey, nearly four in ten New Zealanders lacked trust in evangelical Christians.

=== Hinduism ===
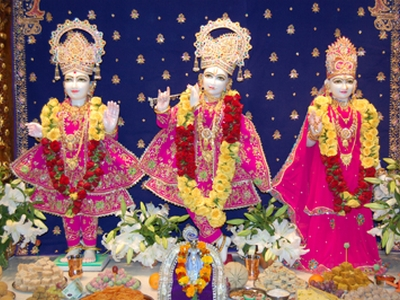
Idols of Radha Krishna inside the Shri Swaminarayan Mandir, Auckland

Hinduism is the second largest religion in New Zealand after Christianity, with over 153,534 adherents according to the 2023 census, constituting 2.9% of the New Zealand population. The number of Hindus in New Zealand grew modestly after the 1990s when the immigration laws were changed.

=== Islam ===
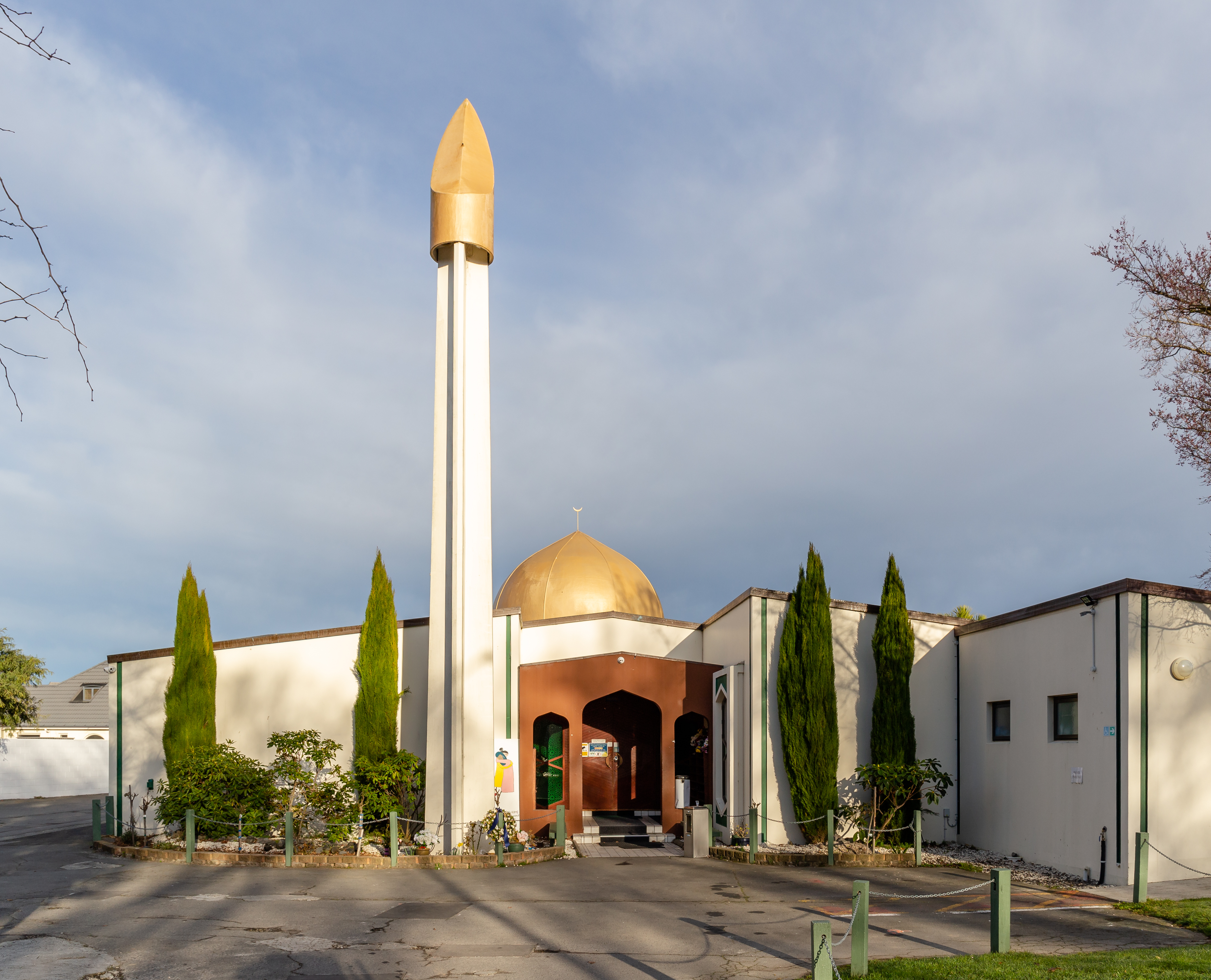
The Al Noor Mosque in Riccarton, Christchurch (pictured in 2019). Built in 1984–1985, it was the world's southernmost mosque until 1999.

Islam in New Zealand began with the arrival of Muslim Chinese gold prospectors in the 1870s. The first Islamic organisation in New Zealand, the New Zealand Muslim Association, was established in Auckland in 1950. 1960 saw the arrival of the first imam, Maulana Said Musa Patel, from Gujarat, India. Large-scale Muslim immigration began in the 1970s with the arrival of Fiji Indians, followed in the 1990s by refugees from various war-torn countries. In April 1979 the three regional Muslim organisations of Canterbury, Wellington and Auckland, joined to create the only national Islamic body—the Federation of Islamic Associations of New Zealand. Early in the 1990s many migrants were admitted under New Zealand's refugee quota, from war zones in Somalia, Bosnia, Afghanistan, Kosovo and Iraq. Since the 11 September attacks there was a spike in conversions to Islam among Māori inmates in prisons.

In the 2018 census, 61,455 people, identified themselves as Muslim constituting 1.32% of the total population making it the third largest religion in the country.

=== Buddhism ===
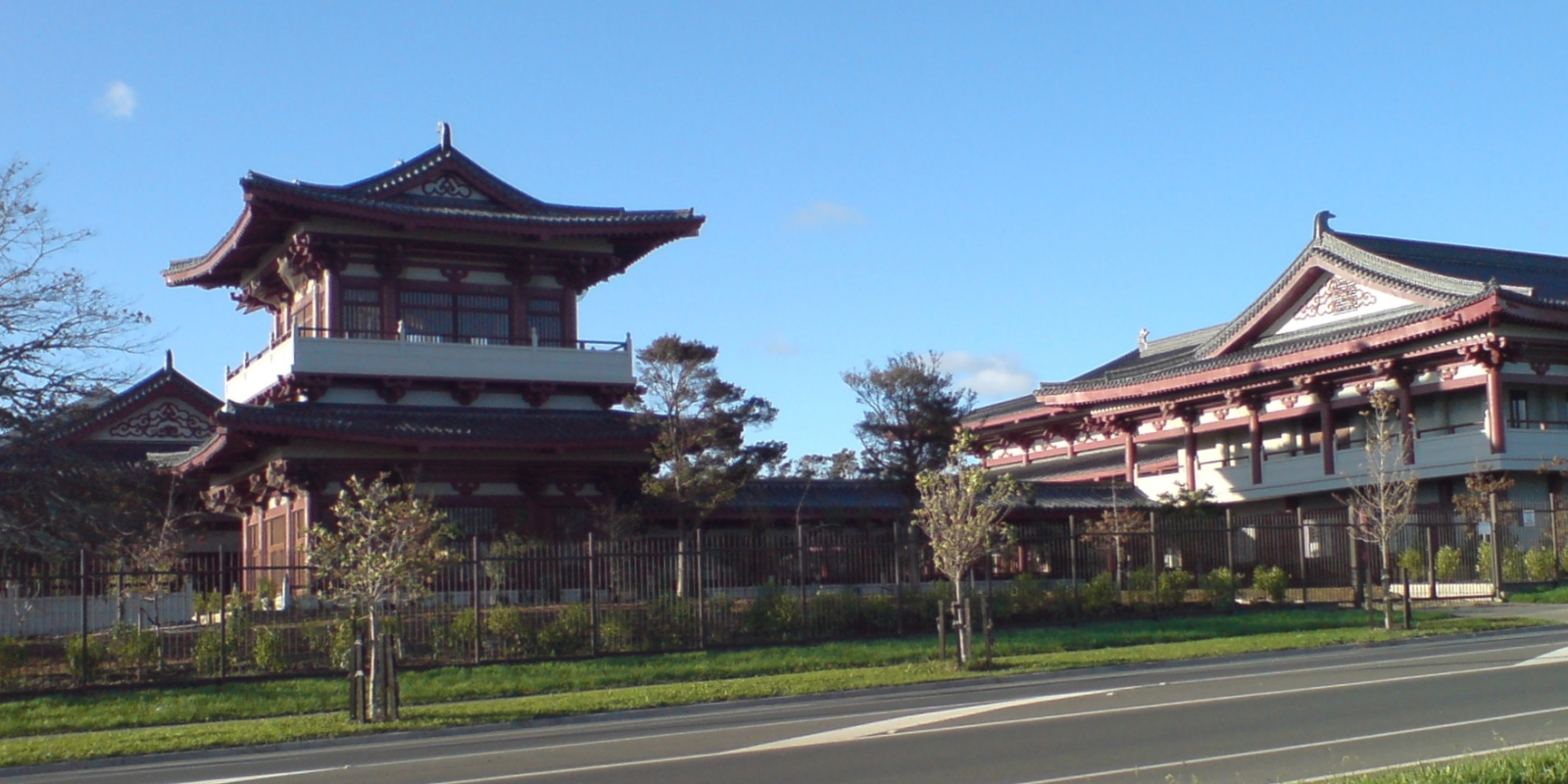
Fo Guang Shan Temple, Auckland

Buddhism is the fourth largest religion in New Zealand, at 1.13% of the population. In 2007 the Fo Guang Shan Temple was opened in Auckland for the promotion of Humanistic Buddhism. It is the largest Buddhist temple in New Zealand.

Most of the Buddhists in New Zealand are migrants from Asia with the number of other New Zealand Buddhists ranging from 15,000 to 20,000.

=== Judaism ===
The history of Jewish people in New Zealand begins in the 1830s with the earliest known settler Joel Samuel Polack. Prominent New Zealand Jews in history include 19th-century Premier Julius Vogel and at least five Auckland mayors, including Dove-Myer Robinson, and a chief justice (Sir Michael Myers). Former Prime Minister John Key is of part Ashkenazi Jewish descent, although he did not practice Judaism.

The first recorded communal Jewish service in New Zealand was held on 7 January 1843 in Wellington, although individual Jews were amongst earlier explorers and settlers.

The Jewish population in New Zealand increased from 6,636 in the 2001 census to 6,867 in the 2013 census. However it decreased to 5,274 in the 2018 census, possibly because of security concerns by Jews over the "digital-first" online census format introduced that year.

The majority of New Zealand Jews reside in Auckland and Wellington, although there is also a significant Jewish community in Dunedin which is believed to have the world's southernmost permanent synagogue. In 2018 census, 0.11% of the population identified as Jewish/Judaism.

=== Baháʼí Faith ===
The first Baháʼí in New Zealand was Englishwoman Dorothea Spinney who arrived in Auckland from New York in 1912. About 1913 there were two converts—Robert Felkin who had met 'Abdu'l-Bahá in London in 1911 and moved to New Zealand in 1912 and is considered a Baháʼí by 1914 and Margaret Stevenson who first heard of the religion in 1911 and by her own testimony was a Bahá'í in 1913. The first Baháʼí Spiritual Assembly In New Zealand was elected in 1926 and their first independent National Spiritual Assembly in 1957. By 1963 there were four Assemblies. In the 2006 census 0.07% of respondents, or 2,772 people, identified themselves as Baháʼí. In the 2018 census 0.05% of respondents, or 2,925 people, reported an affiliation to the Baháʼí Faith. There are some 45 local assemblies and smaller registered groups.

=== Māori religion ===
Traditional Māori religion—that is, the pre-European belief system of Māori people—was little modified in its essentials from that of their Eastern Polynesian homeland, conceiving of everything, including natural elements and all living things, as connected by common descent through whakapapa or genealogy. Accordingly, all things were thought of as possessing a life force, or mauri. Very few Māori still adhere to traditional Māori beliefs—3,699 respondents to the 2018 census identified themselves as adhering to "Māori religions, beliefs and philosophies".

=== Sikhism ===
Sikhs have been in New Zealand for more than a century, with the first arriving in Hamilton in the 1880s. There are now about 40,908 Sikhs in New Zealand, constituting 0.88% of the country's population. Sikhism is the fastest growing religion in New Zealand with the Sikh population in New Zealand having quadrupled since 2006 Sikhs have a strong presence in Auckland, and especially in South Auckland and Manukau, with the National Party's former Member of Parliament for Manukau Kanwal Singh Bakshi being a Sikh. There were thirteen gurdwaras (the Sikh place of worship) in New Zealand in 2010. The largest, Kalgidhar Sahib, is situated in Auckland at Takanini.

== Religion in culture and the arts ==
Although New Zealand is a largely secular country, religion finds a place in many cultural traditions. Major Christian events, such as Christmas and Easter, are official public holidays and are celebrated by religious and non-religious alike, as in many countries around the world. The country's national anthem, God Defend New Zealand, mentions God in both its name and its lyrics. There has been occasional controversy over the degree of separation of church and state, for example the practice of prayer and religious instruction at school assemblies.

The architectural landscape of New Zealand attests to the historical importance of Christianity in New Zealand with church buildings prominent in cities, towns and the countryside. Notable Cathedrals include the Anglican Holy Trinity Cathedral, Auckland, ChristChurch Cathedral, Christchurch and Saint Paul's Cathedral, Wellington and the Catholic St Patrick's Cathedral, Auckland, Cathedral of the Blessed Virgin Mary, Hamilton, Cathedral of the Holy Spirit, Palmerston North, Sacred Heart Cathedral, Wellington, Cathedral of the Blessed Sacrament, Christchurch, St. Joseph's Cathedral, Dunedin. The iconic Futuna Chapel was built as a Wellington retreat centre for the Catholic Marist order in 1961. The design by Māori architect John Scott, fuses Modernist and indigenous design principles.

Christian and Māori choral traditions have been blended in New Zealand to produce a distinct contribution to Christian music, including the popular hymns Whakaria Mai and Tama Ngakau Marie. From 1992 to 2014 New Zealand hosted one of the largest Christian music festivals in the Southern Hemisphere, the Parachute Music Festival.

== Religion in politics ==
While Religion has occasionally played a role, sometimes controversially, in the politics of New Zealand, most New Zealanders consider politicians' religious beliefs to be a private matter according to Colless and Donovan's observations in 1985.

=== Separation of church and state ===
New Zealand has no state religion or established church. However, the following anomalies exist:

- New Zealand's head of state or monarch must declare that they are a Protestant Christian and will uphold the Protestant succession according to the declaration required by the Accession Declaration Act 1910.
- Section 3 of the Act of Settlement 1700 requires that the king or queen of New Zealand must be a Protestant.
- The title of the King of New Zealand includes the statement "by the Grace of God" and the title Defender of the Faith.

At the discussions leading to the Treaty of Waitangi Governor Hobson made a statement (albeit one which had no particular legal or constitutional significance) in defence of freedom of religion—sometimes called the 'fourth' article. In 2007, the government issued a National Statement on Religious Diversity containing in its first clause, "New Zealand has no official or established religion." The statement caused controversy in some quarters, opponents citing that New Zealand's head of state, then Queen Elizabeth II, is required to be the supreme governor of the Church of England. However, Elizabeth II did not act in that capacity as the Queen of New Zealand. A poll of 501 New Zealanders in June 2007 found that 58% of respondents did not think Christianity should be New Zealand's official religion.

There has been increasing recognition of Māori spirituality in political discourse and even in certain government legislation. In July 2001 MP Rodney Hide alerted parliament to a state funded hikitapu (tapu-lifting) ceremony at the opening of the foreign embassy in Bangkok. It was revealed that the Ministry of Foreign Affairs and Trade had a standard policy of employing Māori ritual experts for the opening of official offices around the world. The Resource Management Act 1991 recognises the role of Māori spiritual beliefs in planning and environmental management. In 2002 local Māori expressed concerns that the development of the Auckland-Waikato expressway would disturb the taniwha, or guardian spirit, of the Waikato River, leading to delays and alterations to the project.

Before March 2019, blasphemous libel was a crime in New Zealand, but cases could only be prosecuted with the approval of the attorney-general, and the defence of opinion was allowed; the only prosecution, in 1922, was unsuccessful. In 1967, Presbyterian minister Professor Lloyd Geering faced charges of heresy brought by the Presbyterian Church, but the trial became stalemated and was abandoned.

The New Zealand Parliament opens its proceedings with a prayer. In November 2017 Christian language, including reference to Christ, was removed from the prayer.

=== Christian political parties ===
Christian political parties have usually not gained significant support, a notable exception being the Christian Coalition (New Zealand) polling 4.4% in the 1996 general election. Christian parties have often been characterised by controversy and public disgrace. Many of these are now defunct, such as the Christian Democrat Party, the Christian Heritage Party which discontinued in 2006 after former leader Graham Capill was convicted as a child sex offender, Destiny New Zealand, The Family Party and the New Zealand Pacific Party whose leader, former Labour Party MP Taito Phillip Field was convicted on bribery and corruption charges. United Future was more successful, and although not a Christian party, had significant Christian backing.

The two main political parties, Labour and National, are not religious, although religious groups have at times played a significant role (e.g. the Rātana Movement). Politicians are often involved in public dialogue with religious groups. The Exclusive Brethren gained public notoriety during the 2005 election for distributing anti-Labour pamphlets, which former National Party leader Don Brash later admitted to knowledge of.

=== Agnostic individuals in politics ===
Former Prime Ministers Helen Clark, John Key and Jacinda Ardern, are agnostic.

=== Christian individuals in politics ===
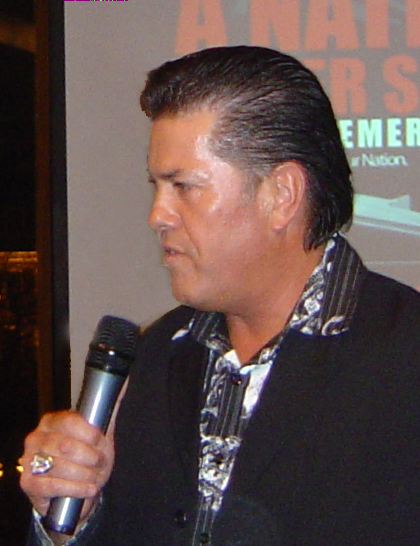
Brian Tamaki of the Destiny Movement has spoken out against secularism.

A number of New Zealand prime ministers have been professing Christians, including Michael Joseph Savage, Walter Nash, Keith Holyoake, Jack Marshall, Bill Rowling, Robert Muldoon, David Lange, Geoffrey Palmer, Jim Bolger and Jenny Shipley. Former Prime Minister Bill English (PM December 2016 to October 2017) is Catholic and has argued that religious groups should contribute to political discourse.

Sir Paul Reeves, Anglican Archbishop and Primate of New Zealand from 1980 to 1985, was appointed Governor-General from 1985 to 1990.

Murray Smith was a member of the New Zealand Parliament from 1972 to 1975 who later affiliated with the Bahá’í Faith and contributed in national and international roles within the Bahá'í Community.

== See also ==
- Irreligion in New Zealand
- List of Christian organisations in New Zealand
- List of New Zealand religious leaders
- National Statement on Religious Diversity – Framework for the recognition of New Zealand's diverse faith communities
