= Mervyn Duffy =

New Zealand Catholic priest and professor (born 1959)

Mervyn Duffy (born 1959) is a New Zealand theologian, educator, writer and member of the Society of Mary. He has contributed to theological education and has served in various academic and pastoral roles throughout his career in New Zealand.

== Education ==
Born in Christchurch in 1959, Duffy began his academic journey with a Bachelor of Science (Honors) from Victoria University in Wellington. He then pursued theological studies, obtaining a Bachelor of Sacred Theology (STB) at Mt St Mary’s Seminary in Hawkes Bay. Furthering his education in Rome, he earned both a Licentiate in Sacred Theology (STL) and a Doctorate in Sacred Theology (STD) from the Pontifical Gregorian University, where his research focused on theological themes, including language, ritual, and sacraments.

== Career ==
Duffy was ordained in 1985 and initially taught mathematics, computing, and religious education at secondary schools in New Zealand. Dr. Duffy later transitioned to higher education, teaching systematic theology until 2025. He served as a lecturer at Te Kupenga—Catholic Theological College and Acting Principal at Good Shepherd College. His research focuses on theology, art, and ecclesiology, and he has published extensively on these topics. He was elected provincial superior of the New Zealand province of the society of Mary in 2025.

== Awards ==
2012 - ACPA Awards for the best article on catechesis. The article title is ‘That Clumsy Word in the creed’.

2016 - John Dunmore Medal for his contributions to enhancing knowledge and understanding of the role of French people and culture in the scientific, economic, historical, and cultural development of the Pacific region.

== Selected works ==
Duffy's publications include:

- Duffy M and Greiler A, Verguet's Sketchbook: A Marist Missionary Artist in 1840s Oceania, Hindmarsh, SA: ATFPress, 2014.
- Duffy M, How Language, Ritual and Sacraments Work: According to John Austin, Jürgen Habermas and Louis-Marie Chauvet, Rome, 2005.
