= David McGill (writer) =

New Zealand writer and publisher

David Keith McGill (born 1 December 1942 in Auckland) is a New Zealand writer and publisher. He writes "thrillers, serious fiction, New Zealand history, dictionaries".

== Early life ==
McGill spent his early childhood in Matata, Bay of Plenty where his father was employed by the New Zealand Post Office. Later, when McGill was 11, the family shifted to Auckland (Evans Rd, Glen Eden, Auckland) when his father became a postmaster. The family later lived at Eastbourne, Wellington where his father was transferred. McGill has said that he was inspired to start writing by his father and his first effort was a diary "in Form Two year" (he was 12) while on holiday at Waiheke Island. It was co-authored by his father. McGill has said that as a teenager he was "moody and intense" and didn't have a clue what he could ever do.

== Education ==
McGill received his secondary education from the Christian Brothers at St Peter's College, Grafton (1953-1957). He then studied for the Catholic priesthood (commencing at the age of 14) under the Jesuits at Holy Name Seminary in 1958 and 1959 which were also the final years in which that institution operated as a minor seminary. McGill was greatly influenced by his time at the seminary and especially by the teaching of the seminary professor, Father Bernard O'Brien SJ (whose nickname was "Dim" because he was so intelligent). They each experienced instances as young men of near-drowning as formative experiences in their lives. However, in relation to his education, he has said that the Brothers at St Peter's College "were sadists. We just got belted. At the seminary the Jesuits humiliated the students with their words." McGill has said that going to the seminary was "a chance to get away from my parents and Auckland and go to Christchurch. It was an adventure. I was the last minor seminarian. Apparently, the dropout rate was 90 per cent." He has said that he was not particularly religious. "I was a solemn young chap, a bit of a loner, not much taken with group activities. I didn't fit in in the seminary. I was buying Playdate magazines, mainly to look at Brigitte Bardot's bum. I spent a lot of time playing snooker. They had a fantastic snooker room with a fullsize table and lots of brass, oak and mahogany. I spent so long there I was told I wasn't taking my vocation as a priest seriously. After two years I wanted to go to university. But I was only 16, so I had to wait another year." McGill later attended Wellington Teachers' College and Victoria University of Wellington. He spent six years (1967-1973) in Europe.

== Career ==
He became a teacher and taught briefly at primary schools in Wellington (Mt Cook School), Eastbourne and Paekākāriki. He also worked in a wool store, and for the Gear Meat Company and became a seagull, a non-registered waterside worker. This enabled him to work on the wharf. McGill started writing at teachers' college. He edited "Stud-Op", short for "Student Opinion". He worked as a journalist for the NZ Listener, TV Times (London) and The Bulletin (Sydney). He was a columnist for the Evening Post (Wellington). He has since 1990 been a full-time non-fiction writer covering a very broad range of New Zealand subjects from, for example, ethnic history to architecture. McGill has also written several novels. He has written more than 50 books.

== Other initiatives ==
McGill was Chairman of Amnesty International NZ and was founder and first elected chairman of the Wellington Civic Trust. His journalism awards include the Reed Literary Award for Environmental Journalism 1978 and the Cowan Memorial Prize in 1981.

== See also ==
- Holy Name Seminary
- Sam Hunt
