= Harvest House International Church =

Harvest House International Church, often abbreviated to 'HHI Church', is a charismatic church founded in 1995, and currently based out of Bulawayo, Zimbabwe. According to the Global Civil Society Database, the church's aim is to "Take the nations for Christ Jesus, preaching the Gospel with signs and wonders following, bringing life and healing to the lost, wounded, lonely, rejected and downtrodden". According to the church, they have nearly 7000 members and 716 churches.

== History ==
The HHI Church was founded in 1995 in the city of Bulawayo, Zimbabwe. It was founded by Dr. Colin Nyathi and Dr. Sarah Nyathi, who became the first bishops of the church. Originally, the Nyathis based services out of their living room, attracting less than 10 people in their first service. Ever since the creation of the church, their membership has increased dramatically, with the church now practicing in 14 nations. This was fueled by the financial instability in Zimbabwe, which fueled the internationalization of the church.

== Church Leadership ==
Colin and Sarah Nyathi still lead the church as the Senior Pastors. The church streams the services to the TV channel Open Heavens, and has a music ministry called Harvest Music. Sarah leads Maximized Lifestyle International, an arm of the church that helps women gain self-sufficiency and focusing on spirituality.

== HHI School of Ministry ==
The School of Ministry offers courses as follows:

1. Certificate in Biblical Studies
2. Diploma in Biblical Studies
3. Higher Diploma in Pastoral Studies
4. Higher Diploma in Prophetic Studies
5. Higher Diploma in Apostolic Studies
6. Higher Diploma in Ministerial Excellence

Since the inception of the school in the early 2000s, more than 7000 people have graduated from the school. At some stage, more than 1000 students had enrolled in this school in one year in the city of Bulawayo. Sister schools have been established in most of the churches around the world. The Zimbabwean School is affiliated to The Ministry of Higher and Tertiary Education and Good Shepherd Ministries, US.
