= Mangatepopo Canyon disaster =

2008 flash flood in New Zealand

- Date: 15 April 2008
- Location: Mangatepopo stream in the Tongariro National Park
- Type: Flash flood
- Deaths: 7; one teacher and six students

The Mangatepopo Canyon disaster was a flash flood that occurred on 15 April 2008 in the central North Island of New Zealand.

Students and staff from Elim Christian College were at the Sir Edmund Hillary Outdoor Pursuits Centre during a gorge trip. The flash flood resulted in the death of six students and one teacher. It occurred at the Mangatepopo stream in the Tongariro National Park.

== Background ==
On 15 April 2008, approximately 40 students were on a school camp at the Sir Edmund Hillary Outdoor Pursuits Centre. The group was from Elim Christian College in Auckland.

== Disaster ==
Ten students, one teacher, and one instructor were on the river when the water level began to rise rapidly due to a thunderstorm. The group took shelter on a ledge. After some time, the instructor, believing that the water level would continue to rise, made the decision to leave the ledge as she feared that the students would be at risk of hypothermia if they stayed there. The plan was for the instructor, Jodie Sullivan, to go first with Ashley Smith and then throw a line to the students as they came down at five-minute intervals. Sullivan and Smith both made it safely to the bank of the left of the river. No one left on the ledge had a watch, which made the timings much more difficult. Kish Proctor went first, and either did not catch the rope or lost his hold on it and went over the dam, but he was later rescued. Peter Shiih caught the rope and made it to safety. Portia McPhail, Natasha Bray and Tara Gregory were unable to catch the rope, went over the dam and drowned. Floyd Fernandes and Anthony Mulder were attached to each other and neither were able to reach the rope; it is assumed that they were too far away from Sullivan and both drowned. Sarah Brooks was unable to catch the rope, went over the dam and survived. Antony McClean, the teacher, attached himself to student Tom Hsu. Antony was initially able to catch the rope, but later lost hold of it and both drowned.

The current proved too strong for most of the group. A total of six students and one teacher died in the event. An in-depth investigation found significant failings at the centre that led to the disaster. Consequently, the centre was fined NZ$480,000 for health and safety breaches. The flash flood had one of the highest death tolls on a school camp in a western country in recent history. The principal of the college, Murray Burton, was awarded a member of the New Zealand Order of Merit for the way he led his community through the disaster.

== Inquiry findings ==
The centre's report lists almost 200 recommendations and lessons learned from the disaster. Findings from the inquiry suggest that if any one of the following failings had been addressed, the disaster would not have happened:

- The weather warning left out the critical word "thunderstorms".
- If the group had stayed on the ledge, the water would have receded after 30–60 minutes.
- High staff turnover at the centre led to poor record keeping and awareness of earlier safety incidents, including one fatality, over the past forty years.
- In 1977 an instructor was killed in the gorge. It appears that Jodie Sullivan was not aware of this.
- Two instructors should have been present for the trip up the gorge.
- Tom Hsu had cerebral palsy. This was not disclosed on the medical form, although Sullivan was aware of it.
- Imprecise communications between Sullivan and the centre lead to confusion about whether the group had gone into the gorge or not.
- The disaster could have been averted if both the teacher and the instructor each had a radio so they could communicate.
- Inaccurate or incomplete permission slips did not fully disclose the students' swimming ability.
- The students were told to leave their cell phones at the campsite, which limited their ability to call for help.
- Overconfidence of the instructor was a factor which led to the deaths associated with the event.
- The centre did not have an up to date weather report.
- Although the activities were listed as a challenge by choice, there was no alternative activity for the students who did not want to participate.
- The centre had a reputation for activities in "rain or shine" which significantly increased the risk and made cancelling an activity harder.

== Dramatisation ==
The events of the disaster were documented in the 2018 made-for-TV movie In a Flash.
