= Lance O'Sullivan (doctor) =

New Zealand Māori physician (born 1973)

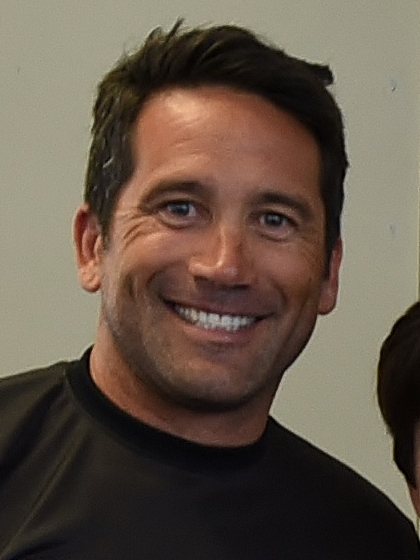
- O'Sullivan in 2018
- Born: 1973 (age 52–53); Auckland, New Zealand
- Education: Medicine, University of Auckland
- Occupation: General practitioner
- Known for: Provision of medical care to children living in poverty.; The MOKO Foundation
- Spouse: Tracy

Lance O'Sullivan (born 1973) is a New Zealand Māori doctor (Te Rarawa, Ngati Hau, Ngati Maru) formerly practising in Kaitaia, Northland. He is also an author, public speaker and public health advocate. In 2013 O'Sullivan was declared Ngā Toa Whakaihuwaka (Supreme Māori of the year), and in 2014 he was declared New Zealander of the Year 2014 for bringing health programmes to disadvantaged in rural areas.

== Early life and education ==
O'Sullivan grew up in the Auckland suburb of Howick and was raised by his single Pākehā mother after she left his alcoholic and violent father. His sister, Nikki, is three years older. He attended school at Pakuranga College and Timaru Boys' High School. Each school expelled him before his mother sent him to Hato Petera College as a boarder. O'Sullivan completed his high school education as dux, head boy, sports champ and a kapa haka star. After graduating from Hato Petera College he spent 2 years working for Customs after dropping out of a science degree programme and becoming a father. At the age of 21 he was accepted into Auckland Medical School. O'Sullivan graduated from Auckland Medical School in 2001.

== Career and health programmes ==
After graduating from medical school, O'Sullivan went to work in the Bay of Plenty where doctors working in isolated and deprived places like Murupara and Kaingaroa influenced him. After five years in the Bay of Plenty, he was offered a job by a Kaitaia Māori health provider and returned "home" to his iwi affiliations, namely Te Rarawa, through his grandmother from Pukepoto.

In 2012 O'Sullivan had a public falling out with his employer after a difference of opinion over how to deal with patients who couldn't afford to pay for medical treatment. With his wife Tracy, he set up a company Navilluso Medical, which set up the MOKO foundation in 2013. The MOKO foundation started a number of healthcare initiatives..

In March 2018 O'Sullivan announced that he was moving his business to Auckland, citing the difficulties of growing such a business in a rural area.

=== Te Kohanga Whakaora ===
On 19 November 2012 O'Sullivan and his wife, Tracy, set up the low-cost health clinic "Te Kohanga Whakaora" (The Nest of Wellness). The clinic was based in the Kaitaia Hospital. The aim was to make basic healthcare accessible for people in the Far North who were unable to afford it. The clinic had emergency prescription funds donated from New Zealanders around the country.

=== Manawa Ora Korokoro Ora ===
In October 2012 O'Sullivan started the MOKO programme ("Manawa Ora Korokoro Ora" healthy heart, healthy throat), Northland's first full-time, school-based health clinic providing medical care to 2000 children within a 25 km radius of Kaitaia. Health Ministry provided support with additional funding from the charity KidsCan.. The program focuses primarily on preventing rheumatic fever by taking a throat swab from every child with a sore throat. The programme also provides basic medical care for nits, skin and chest infections with nurses and health workers visiting each primary and intermediate school three times a week. There are also two GP sessions each week to take care of more complex cases.

=== Kāinga Ora ===
The "Kainga Ora (Well Home)" initiative promotes the idea that wellness begins in safe, warm homes. The initiative commenced in 2012 when O'Sullivan drove around Kaitaia and called in to some of the most rundown looking houses. He found families living with children who were sick due to the condition of their homes. He recruited labour and donated materials to help repair the homes.

=== iMOKO ===
iMOKO started in 2014 as an extension the vMOKO programme. Trained nurses and health workers collected data including photographs and forward it to O'Sullivan's practice in Kaitaia. Photographs were taken as required and O'Sullivan provided a diagnosis or passed the data on for a higher-level diagnosis. iMOKO also provides the capability to send required prescriptions to a nearby pharmacy for collection. The programme saves families long trips to the clinic at Kaitaia, runs efficiently, and can detect disease in the early stages.

By November 2016, 4000 children in approximately 35 early childhood centres, Kōhanga Reo, primary, intermediate and secondary schools participated in this healthcare model.

=== MaiHealth ===
In 2017, two virtual health clinics were opened: the first in the doctor-less town of Pātea; the second in Kaitaia. The clinics enable patients to attend and access healthcare under the iMOKO model with the assistance of trained healthcare workers. In November 2017 the Accident Compensation Corporation and the Ministry of Health announced they would provide O'Sullivan's company, Navilluso Medical, NZ$1.4 million over two years to develop its MaiHealth model

=== Coronavirus pandemic ===
During the COVID-19 Pandemic he publicly criticised the residents of Kaitaia for breaching the lockdown conditions, only to admit later in April 2020 that he had breached the level 4 lockdown by going kayaking.

== Advocacy ==
On 23 May 2017, O'Sullivan disrupted a screening of the anti-vaccine propaganda film Vaxxed in Kaitaia, and criticised the movie before performing the Haka. He addressed the audience, saying that:

This idea of anti-immunisation has killed children around the world, and actually will continue to kill children whose parents are put off immunisation because of misinformation - misinformation based on lies, quite frankly.

His action was supported by the Health Minister at the time, Jonathan Coleman.

O'Sullivan featured in a video supporting the End of Life Choice Bill which had passed the first reading in the New Zealand Parliament in December 2017.

== Bibliography ==
- The Good Doctor: Breaking the Rules, Making a Difference, Penguin, 24 June 2015, ISBN 9780143572510

== Awards ==
- Distinguished Alumni - University of Auckland 2017
- Denis Dutton Award 2017, for courageous and highly visible contributions to the promotion of immunisation and vaccination in New Zealand.
- Communicator of the Year Award 2015
- New Zealander of the Year 2014 for his work on rural health projects.
- Sir Peter Blake Leadership Award 2013
- Supreme Māori of the year 2013
- Public Health Champion (Public Health Association of New Zealand) 2013
