= Bernard O'Brien (Jesuit) =

New Zealand Jesuit and professor (1907–1982)

Bernard Michael O'Brien SJ (9 December 1907 – 3 January 1982) was a New Zealand Jesuit priest, philosopher, musician, writer and seminary professor.

== Early life ==
He was born in Christchurch, New Zealand and was educated by the Dominican sisters at St Thomas's Academy, Oamaru and at Christ's College. His father was a surgeon. He had a sister (who later became Sister Monica O'Brien RSCJ, of Wellington) and two brothers, Arthur and Michael, who remained in Christchurch.

== Training ==
In January 1924, O'Brien commenced his studies as a Jesuit novice at the Loyola Novitiate of the Society of Jesus in Sydney, Australia. There and at Riverview College he also advanced his study of Greek. O'Brien obtained his BA at the National University of Ireland where he also studied music. In 1929, O'Brien went to the Jesuit house of Philosophy at Pullach, a village just outside Munich where, after learning German, and with many German, Austrian and other students from many countries, he embarked on three years of laborious philosophic studies. The philosophy taught was fundamentally medieval scholasticism, as modified by the sixteenth century Jesuit Suárez. O'Brien's "best teacher" was Father Alois Maier who promoted Kant. O'Brien made a special study of Plotinus in relation to the Psychology of art. Karl Rahner was two years ahead of O'Brien but among his companions were Hans Urs von Balthasar, Joseph Neuner and Alfred Delp. In 1932, at the end of his philosophy course, O'Brien received minor orders from Cardinal Faulhaber, Archbishop of Munich. He then returned to Sydney and was given the job of coaching young novices who were beginning their university studies. In 1935, O'Brien went to the Louvain in Belgium to study Theology. His most important teacher there was Joseph Maréchal who combined the "best insights" of Thomas Aquinas with the transcendental speculations of Kant. "His teaching set flowing one of the principal streams of present-day Catholic Philosophy and Theology, a stream from which André Marc and Karl Rahner, J.B. Lotz, Emerich Coreth and Bernard Lonergan have all drunk". O'Brien read particularly the German theologian and mystic Matthias Scheeben and wrote a theological dissertation on Friedrich von Hügel. O'Brien was ordained a priest in 1938 at Louvain and after spending the first few years of World War II in Jesuit establishments in England and in Ireland, he returned to Sydney in 1941.

== Academic career and contribution ==
In Australia, O'Brien was appointed to St Patrick's College, Melbourne to teach boys in 1941. It was there that he published a book on the vocation of a Jesuit priest. In 1942 he was appointed to the Jesuit scholasticate at Watsonia to take care of the university studies of the Jesuit scholastics as he had before. On 2 February 1942 he was admitted to his final vows as a Jesuit. In 1943 he was appointed to Corpus Christi College, Werribee (a seminary for the training of secular priests) near Melbourne to lecture in theology. He filled this position until 1949. In late 1947 temporarily and then permanently in 1950 O'Brien was appointed to Holy Name Seminary in his home town of Christchurch. At that time it was a minor seminary with generally 70–90 secondary school age boys boarding there. By 1959, however, the school aspect had been phased out and the seminary was teaching Philosophy to men who had finished secondary school and were in training to be ordained as secular priests. The result of the change for O'Brien was that he then became a Philosophy lecturer and set about preparing courses in Logic and Theory of Knowledge and the Philosophy of Being. Philosophy hitherto had been taught at Holy Name in programs of a traditional Thomist stamp, whether taught directly from the Catholic textbooks known as "manuals", or from private course notes which represented an updated form of the scholastic system. Even in the 1950s, textbooks were still in Latin, with students expected to know enough of the language to make their way through the three-volume Summula Philosophiae Scholasticae of J. S. Hickey, or, if this was beyond them, with the simplified "dog Latin" of the Manuale Philosophiae ad Usum Seminariorum of Giovanni di Napoli. O'Brien, with his broad interests and education, and his colleagues initiated great changes and he gave Philosophy studies at Holy Name Seminary some standing and "twenty years of clergy owe, if not an appreciation for scholarship at least an acceptance of it to him." O'Brien was well remembered by his students especially for his lectures in logic and metaphysics and for his keen interest in music, art and literature. For many years he supervised the choir at Holy Name Seminary.

== Later years and wisdom ==
O'Brien taught at Holy Name Seminary until it was closed in 1979. He then continued at Holy Cross Seminary, Mosgiel where he lectured in literature and Art. In 1980 his health began to fail and he spent some time at Nazareth House (home for the elderly) in Christchurch. He died at the hospice of St John of God in Richmond, New South Wales, on 3 January 1982.

O'Brien made a considerable contribution, especially in journals and book reviews, to the Catholic church in New Zealand. He once recalled an occasion when, as a young Jesuit in Australia, he barely escaped drowning. "I came to realise that God might call me in early years. I found that I could renounce life, if God so wished. This was a salutary experience – a deepening one." He also wrote of the knowledge in every field of learning, and of the enormous change in the church since Vatican II. "Who can possibly hold that we are simply recalling the stand we took in the past, and adding to it?" He urged that Catholics should adopt what is needed for each new age. "We must learn to react to God's call when it is given, and wait for the time when it is ripe."

== See also ==
- Holy Name Seminary
- Holy Cross College, New Zealand
- George Duggan (priest): A seminary professor from New Zealand and O'Brien's contemporary who had a very different emphasis.
