= Toby Curtis =

New Zealand educator (1939–2022)

Sir Toby Curtis KNZM
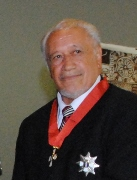
- Curtis in 2014
- Born: Noble Thomson Curtis; 13 November 1939; Rotoehu, New Zealand
- Died: 17 August 2022 (aged 82); Lake Rotoiti, New Zealand
- Occupation: Educator
- Spouse: Mary Agnes Sharry (m. 1966)
- Relatives: Cliff Curtis (nephew)

Sir Noble Thomson "Toby" Curtis (13 November 1939 – 17 August 2022) was a New Zealand educator and Māori leader.

== Early life and family ==
Born at Rotoehu on 13 November 1939, Curtis was of Māori descent, and affiliated to Ngāti Pikiao and Ngāti Rongomai in the Te Arawa confederation. He was educated by the Sisters of St Joseph of the Sacred Heart at St Michael's school, Rotorua, and St Peter's Maori College in Auckland. In 1966, he married Mary Agnes Sharry, and the couple went on to have four children. He was the uncle of actor Cliff Curtis.

Curtis played representative rugby union for Counties and Bay of Plenty.

== Education career ==
Curtis studied at Ardmore Teachers' College and the University of Auckland, graduating with a Diploma of Teaching in 1972, and a Master of Arts degree in 1980. His master's thesis was titled Independent Maori boarding schools: continue or discontinue. He later completed a PhD at the University of Auckland in 2005, titled An investigation of how Hawaiki knowledge is fundamental for Maori leadership, in which he sought to contribute to more authentic traditional knowledge in modern Māori society and to discussion of Māori leadership.

After working as a primary school teacher and with intellectually disabled students, Curtis was principal of his old high school, which had changed its name to Hato Petera College, and vice principal of Auckland Teachers' College during the 1980s. He was director of primary teacher education at Auckland College of Education and then dean of the education faculty at Auckland Institute of Technology during the 1990s, becoming deputy vice chancellor at Auckland University of Technology in 2000. He was appointed chair of the Iwi Education Authority for Ngā Kura-ā-Iwi o Aotearoa (tribal immersion schools) in 2012. He has also served on the council of Te Wānanga o Aotearoa.

== Other activities ==
In the late 1980s, Curtis was chair of the Māori broadcasting advisory committee, leading to the formation of Aotearoa Radio, iwi radio stations, and Māori Television. In 1997, he was appointed chair of Te Māngai Pāho (the Māori Broadcast Funding Agency).

Curtis chaired the Te Arawa Lakes Trust, and was a member of the Iwi Chairs Forum. He also served on the police commissioner's Māori Focus Forum.

Curtis died at his home on Lake Rotoiti on 17 August 2022, at the age of 82.

== Honours ==
In the 2014 New Year Honours, Curtis was appointed a Knight Companion of the New Zealand Order of Merit, for services to Māori education.
