= Hebron Christian College =

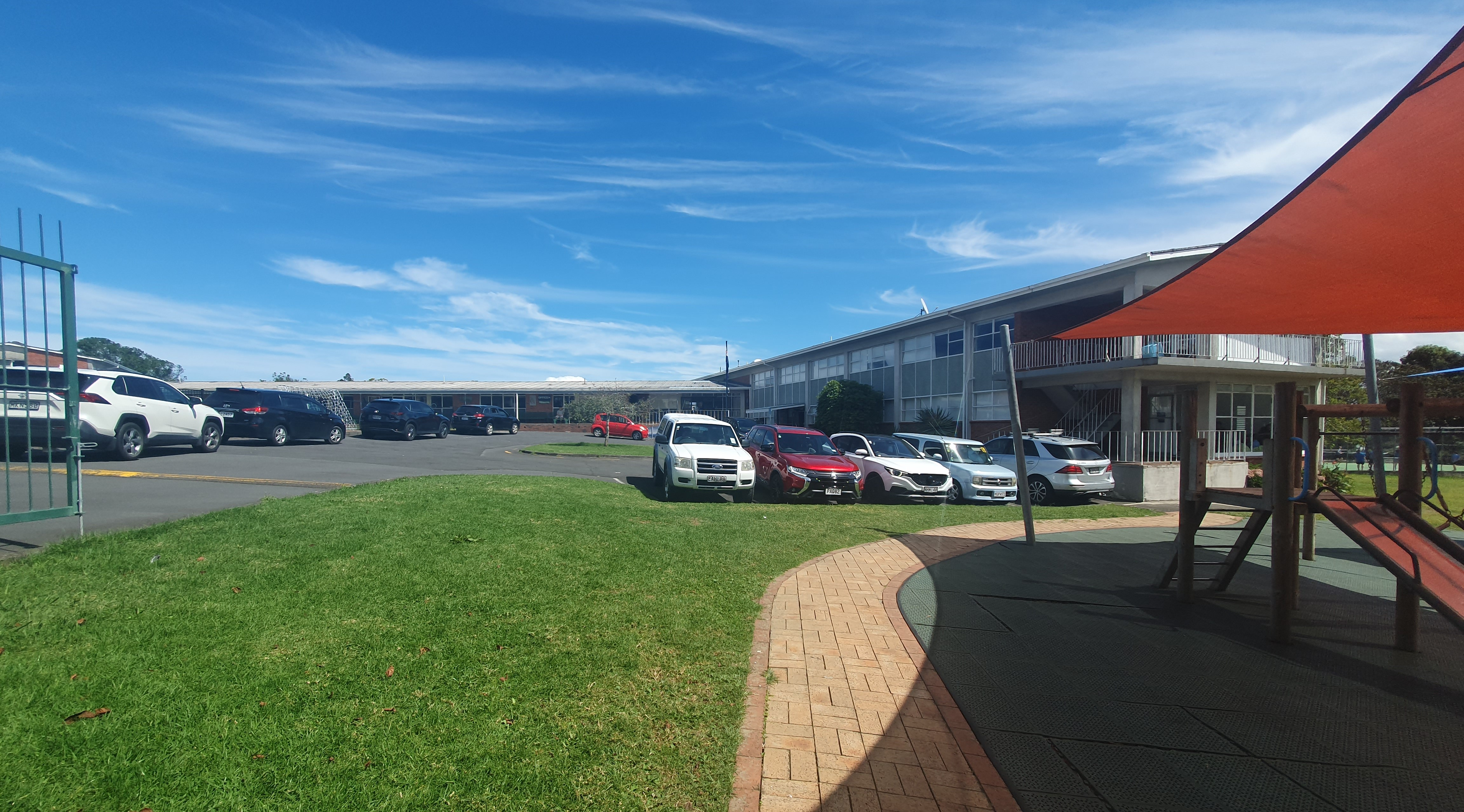
- The Mt Albert Campus of Elim Christian College, located at the former site of Hebron Christian College

Location
- 1 McLean Street; Mt Albert; Auckland; Auckland, 1350; New Zealand; 36.889296°S 174.711985°E

Information
- Funding type: Private
- Motto: To Know Him, To Love Him, To Serve Him
- Religious affiliation: Christian
- Denomination: Non-denominational
- Ministry of Education Institution no.: 73
- Principal: Geoff Matthews
- Teaching staff: 43
- Grades: New Entrant to Year 13 (Form 7)
- Gender: Co-educational
- Age: 5+
- Enrolment: 200–250
- Education system: NCEA
- Colours: Blue, Yellow, Red & Green
- Sports: Netball & Soccer
- Socio-economic decile: 8
- School fees: NZ$5,500–8,500 annually, depending on level, international student fees vary from $10,000–$15,500.
- Website: www.hebron.ac.nz

Hebron Christian College was a small, non-denominational private Christian school in Auckland, New Zealand. The school taught from New Entrant to Year 13 (Form 7). The classes were fairly small, some having fewer than 15 people.

== History ==
In 1977, the Auckland Christian Fellowship Church set up the school. The pastor, Rob Wheeler, had visited Christian schools in the United States earlier that decade, and wanted to set up a school with a similar perspective in New Zealand.

The school began with Claude Warner as principal, and 45 pupils. It was called the Christian Fellowship School, and was in the basement of Haddon Hall in Central Auckland. At that point, the school was using Accelerated Christian Education material, from the US. In 1980 this was discontinued due to the distinctly American nature of ACE's content. The school switched to New Zealand's traditional infant programme.

In 1981, a new site in Mt Albert was purchased from the Karitane Nursing Trust and the wards modified into classrooms. This is the school's present site. Francine Bennett had been acting principal for two terms when Bob Eastland was appointed Principal in 1982. His tenure proved short-lived however, as his resignation due to ill health was received toward the end of that year. Ms Bennett became the principal in 1983. Under her leadership the secondary school was started.

In 1985, Bev Norsworthy became principal. She reinstated the enrolment policy.

Economic crisis in the late 1980s meant that the school, now with a capacity for 220 students, was in financial trouble. The Mt Albert site was put up for sale as the school searched for larger premises, but eventually the decision was made to remain at that location. In 1990, the Institute in Basic Life Principles purchased the property and leased it back to the school at a low rate.

The same year the school became independent of the Auckland Christian Fellowship. It is now operated by the Biblical Education Services Trust. Geoff Matthews was appointed Associate Principal in 1991 and replaced Mrs Norsworthy, who resigned to set up MASTERS Institute, a Christian teachers college, as principal at the start of 1993. In [need date] MASTERS Institute became the School of Education at Laidlaw College.

In February 1998, the school board's application for a roll increase to 320 students was granted. The buildings were developed to accommodate this growth.

The school has applied for integration with the state-funded education system several times. This application has been denied by the Minister of Education, who was Chris Carter at the time.

In 2011 Allan Ross Randall, a former teacher at the school, was jailed for two years for sexual touching of eleven students between 2007 and 2011.

In May 2017, the Hebron Board entered a Memorandum of Understanding with Elim Christian Proprietors Trust that aims to see Hebron Christian College become an Integrated Elim school from the commencement of the 2018 school year.

The school officially closed in December 2017 and began operating as Elim Christian College Mt Albert.
