= Elim Christian College =

Location
- Botany; Auckland; New Zealand; 36°54′50.0″S 174°54′56.5″E

Information
- Type: State Integrated, Co-educational, Composite (Year 1–13)
- Motto: A Future and a Hope
- Religious affiliation: Christianity
- Established: 1988
- Ministry of Education Institution no.: 1190
- Principal: Julian Adamson
- Enrolment: 1,071 (July 2026)
- Socio-economic decile: 8P
- Website: elim.school.nz

Elim Christian College is a state-integrated coeducational secondary school located in Botany, Auckland, New Zealand.

Established in 1988, the school currently caters for approximately 1000 students from new entrants to Year 13, including over 50 international students. The school is associated with Elim Christian Centre.

On 15 April 2008, six students and a teacher from the school died in a flash flood while canyoning the Mangatepopo Stream in Tongariro National Park. In 2011 Principal Murray Burton was made a Member of the New Zealand Order of Merit, and the teacher and one of the six students who died given medals for bravery.

Elim integrated with Hebron Christian College in 2018. In 2024, Elim Christian College opened a new Henderson campus at the former site of Laidlaw College.

== See also ==
- Mangatepopo Canyon Disaster
