= Holy Name Seminary =

Catholic seminary in New Zealand

Coordinates: 36°51′13.67″S 174°44′34.39″E

Holy Name Seminary was a Roman Catholic seminary staffed by the Society of Jesus which existed in Christchurch, New Zealand from 1947 until 1978.

== Establishment ==
With Holy Cross College, the New Zealand national major seminary, not taking school age students from 1932 and with a number of the Catholic secondary schools in the country being used as a recruiting ground for the Marist order, the secondary school training of seminarians for the secular clergy was a cause for concern to the New Zealand bishops. In 1936 the combined Council of Australian and New Zealand Bishops discussed the possibility of a national minor seminary for New Zealand. In 1939 the Sacred Congregation for the Propagation of the Faith sent an official instruction advising New Zealand to establish a minor seminary. A year later the issue was raised again when the Apostolic Delegate visited Holy Cross College and suggested the establishment of a minor seminary on the same site.

Bishop Patrick James Lyons of Christchurch, with the decisive support of Archbishop Liston of Auckland, decided to push the project, and the New Zealand bishops agreed to the setting up of the seminary to be sited in the Christchurch diocese. A large estate was purchased at 265 Riccarton Road. The building, which had been built and occupied by the Kincaid family, was later renamed and was known after the seminary closed in 1978, as Antonio Hall. The seminary was opened in February 1947 by Archbishop Panico the Apostolic Delegate, who came over from Sydney, and with members of the New Zealand hierarchy and the Prime Minister Peter Fraser in attendance.

== Minor seminary ==
The Society of Jesus staffed the seminary and the first rector was Father Noel Hehir SJ with Fathers Leo Perry SJ and Gerard McGinty SJ to assist him. Their arrival (with the Apostolic Delegate) in New Zealand was dramatic as their ship, MS Wanganella, went aground on Barrett Reef at the entrance to Wellington Harbour, and they had to be rescued. The seminary was in effect a boys' secondary school for the early training of those boys who wished to become priests in later life. The course of studies was appropriately designed and included Greek, Latin and History. The first class consisted of 40 thirteen- and fourteen-year-old boys. They were dressed in soutanes, as was then common in all seminaries throughout the world.

== Major seminary ==
In the 1950s, Holy Cross College, the major seminary, became overcrowded and it was necessary from 1954 to house the Philosophy students elsewhere. They were sent to Holy Name Seminary, and year by year the school studies diminished and were replaced by Philosophy. In 1955 the seminary stopped accepting new entrants from secondary school and in 1959 Holy Name Seminary became entirely a major seminary, for students who had finished their school course before they arrived. One student described the best things about the seminary in 1958–59 as: "superb sporting facilities – footy fields, tennis courts, a fullsize billiards table and a room around it straight out of Empire clubland, cricket pitches, running track, gardening even – the three square meals a day cooked by the nuns, the scholastic brio, the great library, the mateship of minds directed to the single purpose of serving God, the sublime plain chant of Mass"; and he described Easter as: "Midnight Mass for one-and-three-quarter-hours. fantastic singing, the altar ablaze with candles and brass, the nuns' incredible flower arrangements from the garden, the incense and silk vestments of gold and white on the priests, everybody on their feet singing our hearts out for Christ has Risen".

Students for the priesthood routinely did two years Philosophy study at Holy Name Seminary and their third year Philosophy and four years of Theology at Holy Cross College. Some celebrated Jesuits taught at Holy Name Seminary, most notably the New Zealander Bernard O'Brien, who helped to give Philosophy studies at Holy Name some standing. In the mid-1960s students at Holy Name Seminary started to go to the University of Canterbury to do degrees (this could mean that their stay at Holy Name extended to three years).

== Closure ==
During the 1970s the decrease in student numbers raised the question of amalgamating Holy Name Seminary and Holy Cross College. Holy Name Seminary closed at the end of the 1978 academic year. The amalgamation resulted in much of the Philosophy teaching vanishing from the curriculum for trainee New Zealand priests.

== Fire ==
On Friday 12 July 2019 fire destroyed about thirty percent of the building with news reports that the chapel and the two wings survived.

== Statistics ==
Although the academic records from Holy Name Seminary were destroyed, it seems that in the period 1964–1978 there were 343 people who attended Holy Name Seminary. Of these, 91 were later ordained.

== See also ==
- David McGill (writer) – New Zealand writer and publisher
- Holy Cross College (New Zealand)
- Marist Seminary – Catholic tertiary college in New Zealand
- Te Kupenga Catholic Theological College
- St Mary's Seminary – Catholic seminary in New Zealand
- List of Jesuit sites
