= St Mary's Seminary =

Catholic seminary in New Zealand

Coordinates: 36°47′28″S 174°45′40″E

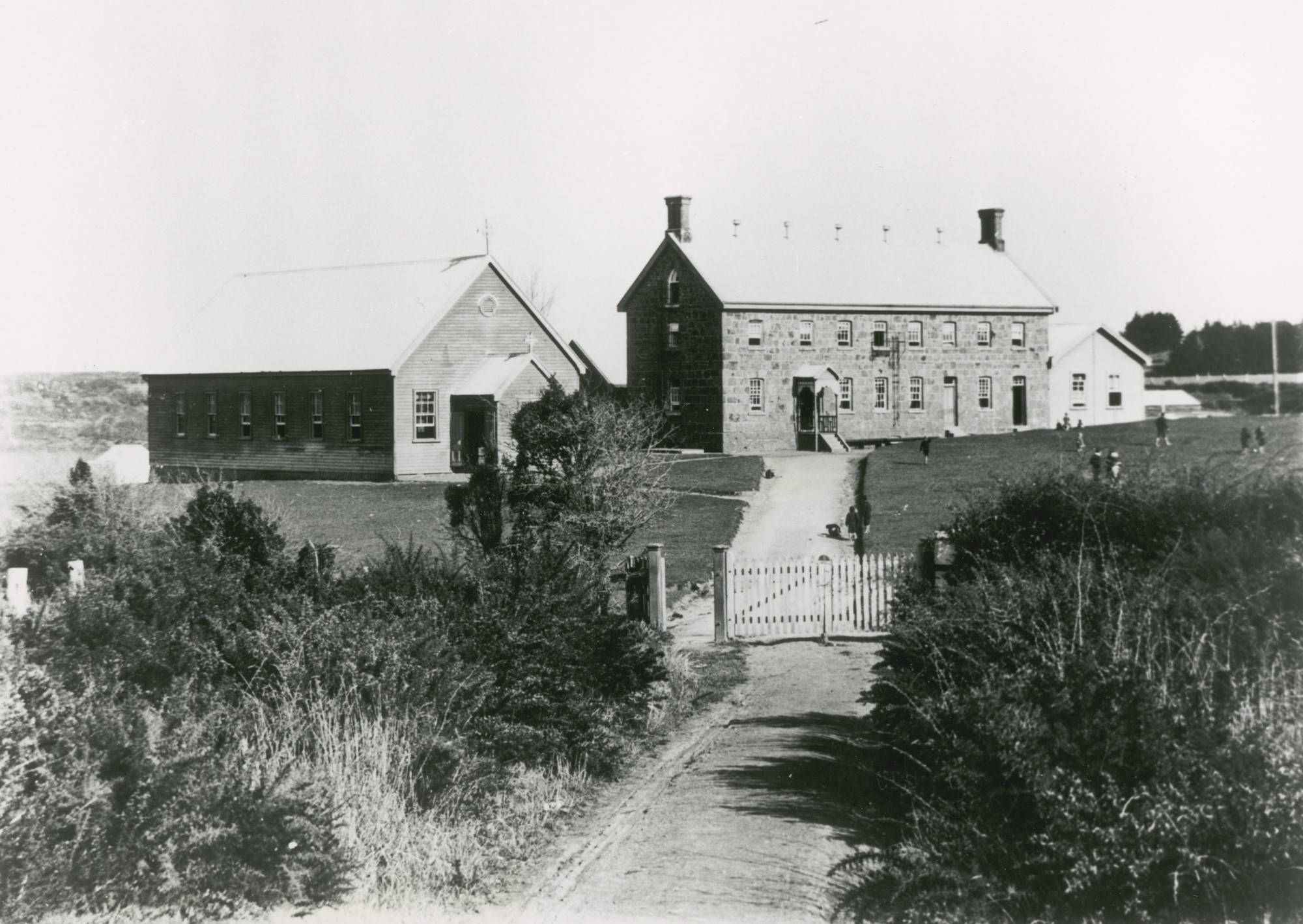
St Mary's College in Takapuna, pictured in the early 1920s after becoming St Joseph's Orphanage

St Mary's Seminary in Auckland, New Zealand, was established in 1850 by New Zealand's first Catholic bishop, Jean Baptiste François Pompallier. It operated until 1869.

From his arrival in 1838, Pompallier had worked energetically to train priests locally for his new mission. In April 1850 he returned from a trip to Europe with ten seminarians and established a seminary in Auckland to complete their formation. The completion of the training of the new seminarians was carried out quickly so that within five weeks all but one of them were ordained.

The seminary, which he named "St Mary's College", had Pompallier's Vicar General, the Rev. Louis Rozet, S.M., as its first Rector. It was first established on the North Shore of Auckland but was moved across Waitematā Harbour to Ponsonby in 1852. The original seminary site is now occupied by St Joseph's Catholic School.

The Seminary survived for 19 years, until Pompallier retired and left New Zealand in 1869. St Mary's Seminary educated at least twenty-four priests, all of them European and some of them already part-trained in Ireland or France.

The college also educated many Māori catechists, some of whom were encouraged to stay on for training for the priesthood. One, Keremeti Pine from Ōkaihau, was even sent to Rome, where for three years among seminarians from Africa and Asia, he spoke Latin and passable Italian. However, no Māori candidate for the priesthood was ordained at this time. The Māori catechists, however, proved to be the backbone of the development of the Catholic faith among the Māori during the remaining decades of the 19th century.

== See also ==
- Roman Catholicism in New Zealand
- Holy Cross College (New Zealand) – Catholic secondary school in New Zealand
- Marist Seminary – Catholic tertiary college in New Zealand
- Good Shepherd College – Catholic tertiary college in New Zealand
- Holy Name Seminary – Catholic seminary in New Zealand
- Hato Petera College – Former school in Auckland, New Zealand
