= Christchurch City Mission =

Charitable trust in New Zealand

- Christchurch City Mission – Te Whare Mihana ki Ōtautahi
- Te Whare Mihana ki Ōtautahi (Māori)
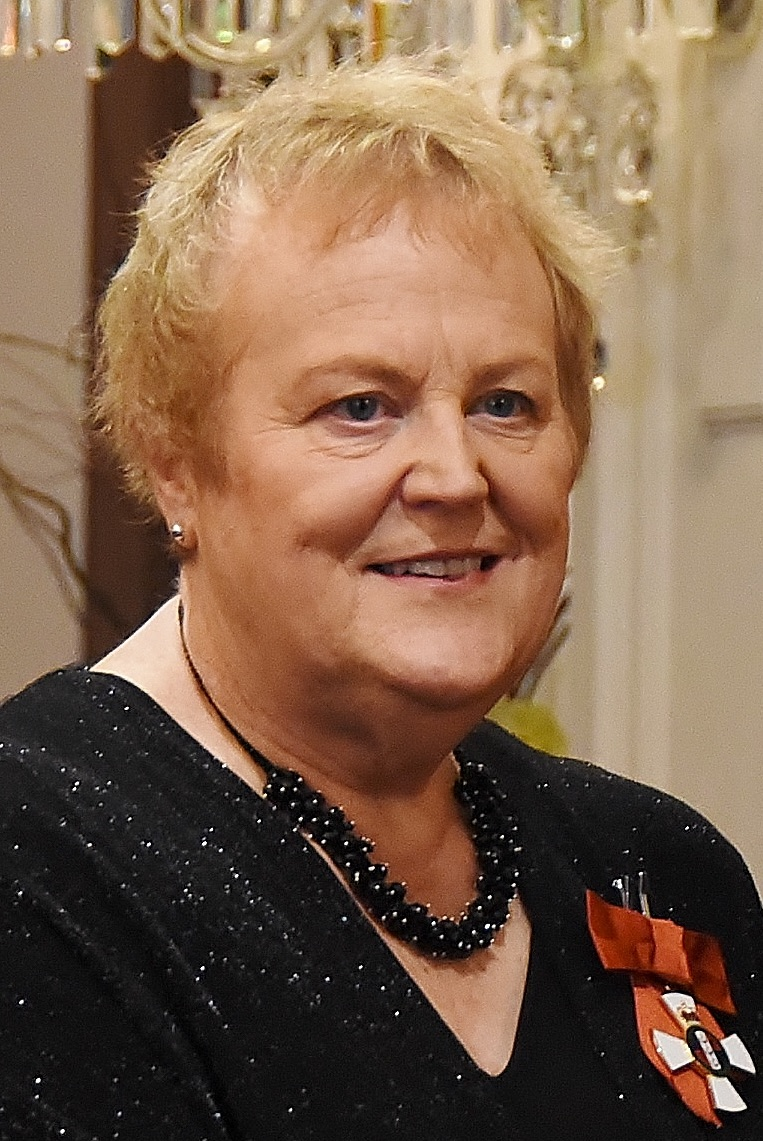
- Corinne Haines, Christchurch City Missioner, at her 2016 investiture as CNZM, for services to business
- Formation: 1929; 97 years ago
- Type: Charitable trust
- Registration no.: CC24160 (under Charities Act 2005)
- Purpose: community housing, social services, foodbank
- Headquarters: 276 Hereford Street
- Region served: Canterbury
- Services: foodbank; housing; health; research; elder care; tenants protection; alcohol and drug addiction
- Website: www.citymission.org.nz

Christchurch City Mission (Māori: Te Whare Mihana ki Ōtautahi) is a New Zealand-based charitable trust. Established in 1929; 97 years ago in central Christchurch, it responds to poverty in the city by providing a foodbank, emergency accommodation, budget and tenancy advice, social work and counselling, detox facilities and support.

The mission works in both crisis intervention and preventative capacities, with an aim to enhance the quality of life for individuals and empower them to achieve greater self-sufficiency within the community. Extra demands were placed on its services and facilities after the 2010 Canterbury earthquake and 2011 Christchurch earthquake. Demand for food parcels rose, when people had to leave their homes, and experience hunger, isolation and insecurity, perhaps for the first time.

Its own buildings were damaged by the earthquakes, and it opened new premises at 276 Hereford Street in 2012. As part of the development, the heritage listed St Luke's Chapel was shifted to directly face the road.

The mission is under the auspices of the Anglican Church, but only as a guiding light. It is not funded by the church and most staff are not Anglicans. The organisation relies on donations, as well as support from volunteers. Its op shops are central to funding.

In 2022, Corinne Haines became the first woman to lead the mission.

Christchurch City Mission’s goals align with other New Zealand social service agencies working towards a just society, including Auckland City Mission and Citizens Advice Bureau New Zealand.
