= Hato Petera College =

Former school in Auckland, New Zealand

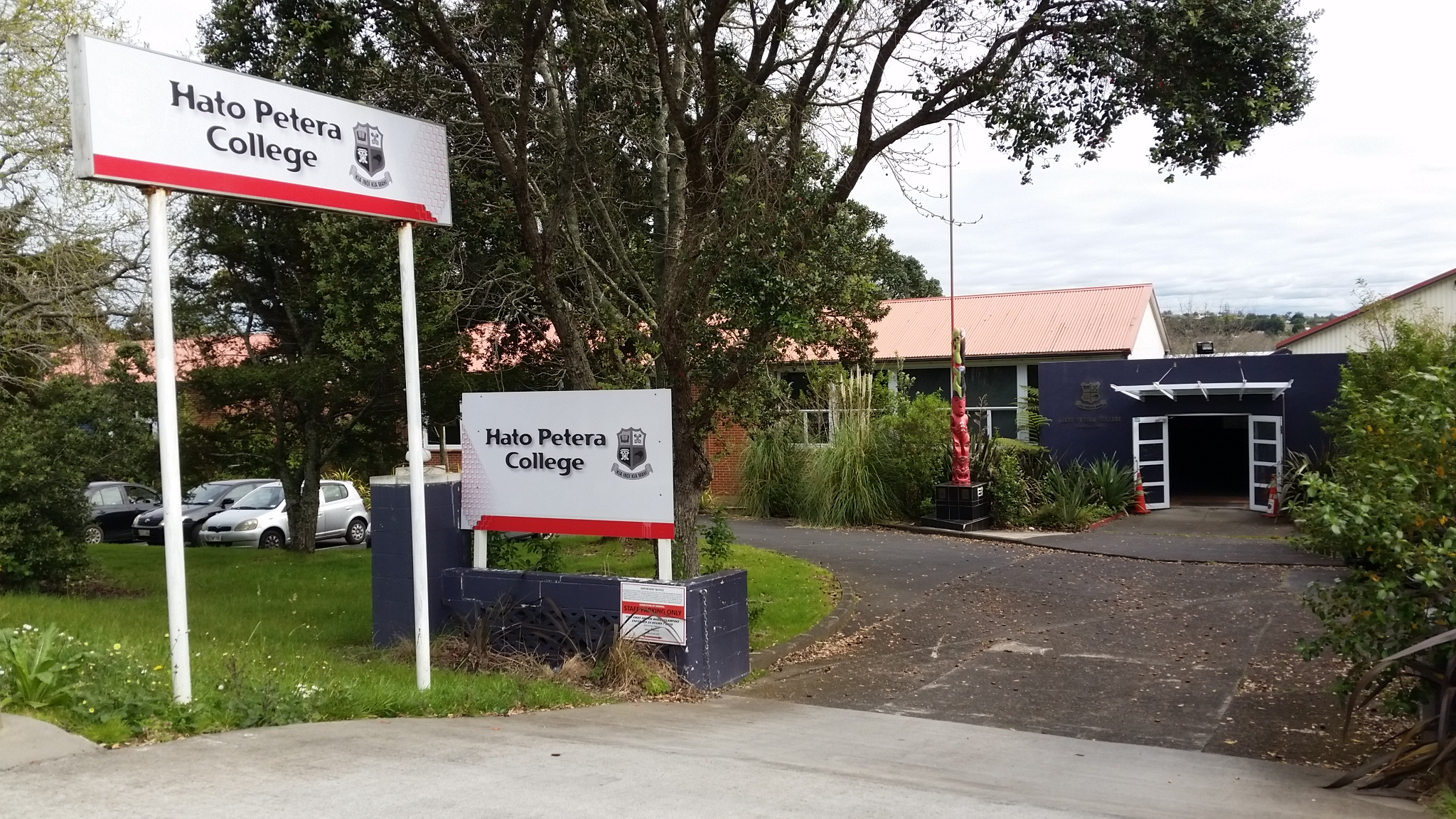

Location
- 103 College Road, Northcote, Auckland, New Zealand; 36.7978°S 174.7523°E

Information
- Type: Integrated secondary (year 9-13); Co-Ed
- Motto: Kia inoi kia mahi ("Work and pray")
- Established: 1928
- Closed: 2018; established for 90 years.
- Ministry of Education Institution no.: 33
- Years: 9–13
- Socio-economic decile: 3G
- Website: hatopetera.com

Hato Petera College (formerly called St Peter's Māori College) was an integrated, co-educational college in Northcote Central, Auckland, New Zealand for students from Year 9 to Year 13. It existed for 90 years, opening on 3 June 1928 and closing on 31 August 2018. The school had a strong Catholic and Māori character. It was located on part of the land originally given by Sir George Grey, Governor of New Zealand, to Bishop Pompallier, the first Bishop of Auckland, in 1849 for education purposes.

The school was established and staffed in 1928 by the Mill Hill Fathers and later the Marist Brothers provided staff. Hato Petera College was the only Māori Catholic co-educational learning institute. In 2016 the school roll was 35, but, following the closure of the boarding facilities in 2017, the roll plummeted. A commissioner was appointed by the Minister of Education to manage the school while consultations to decide its future took place. In June 2018, the school was facing imminent closure and it was officially closed on 31 August 2018.

== History ==
=== The land ===
A 9,500-acre (3,800-hectare) area of land was purchased by Governor Sir George Grey from "... Ngāti Paoa and their related tribes of Ngāti Maru, Ngāti Tamatera, and Ngāti Whānaunga, Te Kawerau and Ngāti Whātua. Eruera Maihi Patuone, the Ngāpuhi chief was also concerned in the sale because his wife at that time was Riria, a member of the Hauraki tribes." The Governor set aside 359 acres (145 hectares) of the purchase for educational purposes. Of this, 250 acres (100 hectares)—"the Roman Catholic Endowment Block"—was given to Bishop Pompallier "for the education of the children of subjects of both races, and of children of other poor and destitute perons being inhabitants of the islands of the pacific". Pompallier endeavored to carry out this intention. The area which became the site of the college was an area of 32 acres (13 hectares). The area was partly occupied by a girls' orphanage which burnt down in 1913. A large house was also existing on the site in 1928 and this became the residence of the Mill Hill Fathers.

=== St Peter's Catechist School ===
Hato Petera College (then called Saint Peter's Catechist School but officially known as St Peter's Rural Training School) was founded as a school to train boys as catechists to assist Mill Hill priests in the Māori mission. The catechist tradition was created in New Zealand by Bishop Pompallier and many Māori catechists were trained at his St Mary's Seminary which began its existence near the present site of Hato Petera College. The Mill Hill priests came to New Zealand in 1886 to work amongst Māori. The value of catechists was soon recognised when it became apparent that there were not enough priests to carry out this task and that their formal training was necessary. The school was opened on 3 June 1928 by Bishop Cleary, the sixth Catholic Bishop of Auckland. This was with an enrolment of 13 students (Taniere Erihe, George Harris, Nahi Horomona, Akutina Karehana, Hakopa Karora, Petera Mahuta, Kamira Matini, Denis Murphy, Hare Parenara, Timoti Rewi, Gabriel Tohiraukura, Wiremu Tuiri, Kaperiere Waipouri). They were taught by two Dutch priests, Fathers Edward Bruning (Pa Eruera) and John Spierings (Pa Hoane) and two lay teachers (Mr Calloway and Mr Priestly). The intention was to train the boys to become men of prayer to give religious instruction and to help in other religious duties. They were chosen by the priests of the mission to be given the necessary training in Catholic Doctrine. The school was to support itself from its farm as no fees were charged. The first Rector was Father Bruning (1928-1929). He was succeeded by the Austrian, Father Joseph Zenna (Pa Hohepa) (1930-1933). From 1933 to 1960, the Rector was the Dutchman Dean Martin Alink (Pa Matene)) who himself physically constructed much of the college as well as being the superior of the Mill Hill mission in New Zealand. He remained at the college until his death in 1964.

=== Hato Petera College ===
By the 1940s, it was becoming apparent that the school needed to fulfil a wider educational role for Māori youth than to be just a school for catechists. In 1946 the school was registered as a secondary school. The Marist Brothers, who had expressed a wish to be involved in Māori education on their own property near the school, instead agreed to provide staff for the secondary school from that year. At the end of 1969 the Mill Hill Fathers withdrew from the college and its administration was in the hands of the Marist Brothers from January 1970. The college changed its name from "St Peter's Māori College" to "Hato Petera College" in 1972.

=== Integration, co-education and closure ===
In 1982, the proprietor of the college (the Catholic Bishop of Auckland) signed an integration Agreement with the Minister of Education and the college entered the State education system. The college became co-educational in 1993. The school was closed on 31 August 2018.

== Ethos ==
=== Enrolment ===
Hato Petera College was established to support Maori Catholic children of modest backgrounds. A student's Māori-Catholic background, Māori socio-economic background, and "whanau connection through history to the kāinga" were among the factors considered in accepting an enrolment. This approach was established by the integration agreement between the New Zealand Government and the Bishop of Auckland, the proprietor of the college, under the Private Schools Conditional Integration Act 1975 (as it was - later under the Education Act 1989). The enrolment of non-Catholic students at the school was limited to 5 per cent of the total roll.

=== Special character ===
The college's special character nurtured students as Maori Catholic in living and learning the values of Jesus Christ through religious education (compulsory at all year levels) ceremonies and observances which valued the college's patron saints, Hato Petera (Saint Peter), Hato Hohepa (Saint Joseph, patron saint of the Mill Hill Fathers), Hato Maherino (St Marcellin Champagnat, founder of the Marist Brothers) and tūpuna Māori (Māori ancestors). The curriculum also included "the pillars that derive from the vision" of St Marcellin and the Marist Brothers "and followers of his charism – his spirituality." These were: Presence, Simplicity, Family spirit, in the way of Mary and Love of work. They were integrated with the "core Māori values" into religious instruction, ceremonies, observances and procedures of college life. These core values were: Tapu (dignity), Mana (honour), Tika (truth), pono (integrity) and Aroha (love). As well as participation in the college's religious education programme, all students were required to participate in the Te Reo Maori me ona Tikanga (Māori-language and culture) programme.

=== Marae, Whare Karakia and Kāinga noho ===
At the centre of school life were particular institutions, Te Kamaka Marae, Whare Karakia and Kāinga Noho. The school Marae, Te Kamaka Marae, had its own Kaumatua and Kuia and assisted all to be immersed in Te Reo and ona Tikanga. The Whare Karakia (school chapel) hosted morning and evening Karakia or prayers, the Rosary and Sunday Mass to which all whanau and the local community were invited. The chapel was originally built in 1957 and was opened by Archbishop Liston on 26 October of that year. It represented a considerable financial effort by the small St Peter's Maori College old boys association (as the ex-pupils association was called then) which raised £859 for the project. The college's boarding facilities or Kāinga noho attempted to be a "home away from home" for the students who were supported by Mātua Atawhai (kāinga parents).

=== Te Hikioi (academic mentoring) ===
The college assisted students with Te Hikioi, a programme aimed at Year 10 to Year 13 students, which involved structured after-school sessions taking place twice a week. It paired kura pupils with second and third year tertiary students from AUT University to encourage effective exam preparation, homework assistance and positive study habits. This mentoring was designed to encourage academic values to help students reach their tertiary, and higher education, aspirations.

=== Staff ===
In 2012, Hone Matthews commenced his term as Principal of the college. In Term 2 of the same year, Rev Te Hira Paenga was welcomed to the school as the new Associate Principal. Already in place at this time were Mrs Rose Silay, as Deputy Principal and Director of Religious Observances and Shanan Halbert as Operational Manager. The Kaumatua of the school was Matua Pouro Kanara, from Motuti in the Hokianga.

=== Vocational pathways ===
In 2012, the college entered into a contractual agreement to support the development of a new Health Sciences Academy, aimed at increasing the number of Maori tertiary students intending to work towards a career in health. In 2015 three other Umanga were established as part of the schools alignment to the Ministry of Education's "Vocational Pathways" kaupapa. There were four academies: Te Umanga Oranga (Health and social services) – Te Aniwa Tutara, Kaiarataki/Kaiako – Te Umanga Tu Taua (Defence services) – Ngahiwi Walker, Kaiarataki – Te Umanga Business and Hospitality – Aroha Kelly, Kaiarataki – Te Umanga Hangarau. Te Hira Paenga, Kaiarataki/Kaiako.

=== Sport ===
The college offered a full range of sports for its students on its large 15-hectare (37-acre) campus and at nearby facilities.

== Closure ==
Until the end of 2016, the college offered full-time boarding for enrolled students. It then became a day school. In April 2018, it had only one remaining student. By June 2018, the roll had increased to five students, but the college faced imminent closure. On 31 August 2018, the Catholic Bishop of Auckland (the college's proprietor) and the Minister of Education cancelled the college's integration agreement under the Education Act 1989 and it was officially closed.

== Continuing use and future ==
The Bishop of Auckland, as the owner of the land, indicated that he would like it to continue to be used for educational purposes consistent with the original deed of gift from the Crown. In 2023 the site was managed for the Catholic Diocese of Auckland by the Interim Governance Group (IGG). The school buildings were being used for alternative education, another area for housing and social services, and the school playing fields for sports. A monthly Mass in Maori was celebrated in the old school chapel. The IGG was working on a precinct plan to develop a "bigger picture plan for the site".

== Notable alumni ==
- Toby Curtis KNZM (1939–2022) – educator and Māori leader.
- Ralph Hotere (1931–2013) ONZ, (Te Aupōuri) – artist
- Walter Little – All Black – fly-half/centre (1990–1998)
- Angus Macfarlane, (Te Arawa) – Māori academic and teacher/kaiako
- Paratene Matchitt, (Whanau-a-Apanui, Te Whakatōhea and Ngati Porou) – sculptor and painter
- Lance O'Sullivan, (Te Rarawa, Ngati Hau and Ngati Maru) – doctor, New Zealander of the Year 2014
- Wiremu Te Awhitu (1914–1994), (Ngāti Hauaroa and Ngāti Maniapoto) – first Māori Catholic priest
- Ratahi Tomuri – designer
- Ranginui Walker (1932–2016), DCNZM, (Te Whakatōhea) – Māori academic and writer

== See also ==
- Roman Catholicism in New Zealand
- Māori people
- Jean Baptiste Pompallier
- St Mary's Seminary
- Roman Catholic Diocese of Auckland

== Sources ==
- Pat Gallager, The Marist Brothers in New Zealand Fiji & Samoa 1876-1976, New Zealand Marist Brothers' Trust Board, Tuakau, 1976.
- Hato Petera College (St Peter’s Maori College): golden jubilee, 1928-1978, Hato Petera College, Auckland, 1978. ("Golden Jubilee")
- E.R. Simmons, A Brief History of the Catholic Church in New Zealand, Catholic Publication Centre, Auckland, 1978 and In Cruce Salus, A History of the Diocese of Auckland 1848 - 1980, Catholic Publication Centre, Auckland 1982.
- Michael King, God's farthest outpost : a history of Catholics in New Zealand, Viking, Auckland 1997.
- W. Tuerlings M.H.M, Mill Hill and Māori Mission, Mills Hill Fathers (?), Auckland (?), 2003.
- Nicholas Reid, James Michael Liston: A Life, Victoria University Press, Wellington, 2006.
