= Holy Cross College, New Zealand =

Catholic secondary school in New Zealand

Coordinates: 36°51′13.67″S 174°44′34.39″E

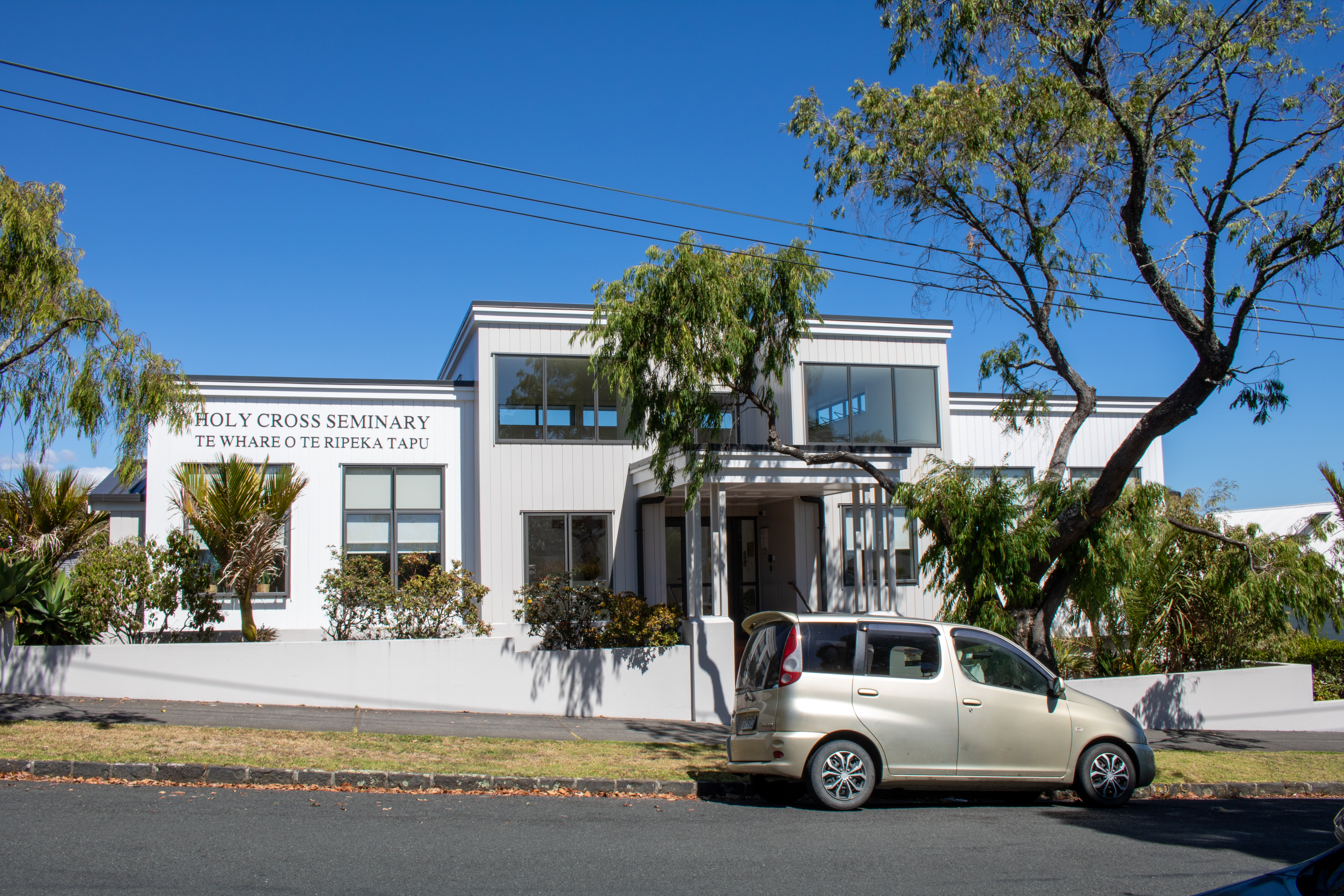
The Holy Cross Seminary in Ponsonby, Auckland.

Holy Cross College or Holy Cross Seminary is the national Roman Catholic seminary of New Zealand for the training of priests. It was first opened in 1900 in Mosgiel and was relocated to Auckland in 1997.

== Establishment ==
In the late nineteenth century, although there were 90,000 Catholics constituting about 14 per cent of the total population, New Zealand had no seminary for training priests

In 1850 Bishop Pompallier the first bishop, had established a seminary in Auckland, St Mary's Seminary, which resulted in the ordination of more than twenty four priests over two decades. Hampered by financial difficulties and personality problems, the seminary closed in 1869. Various bishops, particularly Patrick Moran first Bishop of Dunedin, had expressed concern over the absence of a national seminary. Its lack became pressing when New Zealand was created an ecclesiastical province with Wellington as the Metropolitan See in 1887. Prior to this the New Zealand Bishops were largely influenced by Cardinal Moran in Sydney to send seminarians to his Manly seminary where Bishop Michael Verdon, the second Bishop of Dunedin (1896-1918) had been Rector.

In 1896 Verdon expressed the need for local training from a particular perspective when he complained that his "most promising student James Liston had returned from Manly to New Zealand "undernourished and unwell". Verdon wrote to Dr. Murphy (Verdon's successor as Rector at Manly) complaining that Liston: " ... was in very poor health indeed when he came home in December and his parents were greatly troubled about him. They brought him to the best doctor in Dunedin who forbade them to send him again to Manly. His parents will keep him at home for some months and then will probably send him to Ireland to continue his studies". Verdon was determined that New Zealand should have its own seminary and offered to take full personal responsibility for the venture. The other New Zealand Bishops accepted his offer.

The seminary was to be a minor (high school, preparatory) as well as a major (arts, philosophy and theology) seminary. On 12 April 1899 Bishop Verdon purchased a house on an 11-acre site at Mosgiel built in 1878. Verdon thought that he could staff the seminary with Vincentian priests. But he was unsuccessful in obtaining their services and decided to start the college with his own priests. The seminary, with eleven students in residence, and with Bishop Verdon as its first Rector, opened on 3 May 1900, the Feast of the Holy Cross. A later teacher at, and Rector (1910-1920) of, the college was James Michael Liston.

== Holy Cross College at Mosgiel ==
In August 1900 work began on a new chapel for the college. It was blessed and opened on 3 May 1901. Its architect was Commanditori Leonardi, the papal architect for Pope Leo XIII and a friend of Verdon's. Built in true Roman style, with semicircular windows, marble altar, gilded copper ceiling and classic ionic pilasters, the chapel was an important part of Verdon's attempt to recreate at Mosgiel the spiritual atmosphere of Rome. The first ordination in the chapel occurred in 1902 when Patrick O'Neill was ordained a deacon. In 1902 the enrolment had doubled to 22. On 12 December 1909 Verdon ordained the first six priests from the seminary. The establishment of Holy Cross College was a significant step forward for the Church in New Zealand ensuring an adequate supply of clergy trained in New Zealand and also creating "a very real bond between the secular priests of the country". From the beginning Holy Cross Seminary was designed to equip priests to minister within an established minority community and to preserve the identity of that community. The seminary gave to its students a monastic type formation. Only by separating people from the world and giving them a new vision would they be able to re-enter the world and save people from it. Over the next 50 years the college became even more like a monastery. Even though it was located near the bustling city of Dunedin, it was yet set apart in relative isolation. It became an oasis of prayer, study and seclusion. The gradual establishment of various institutions like a printery, bindery, butchery, darkroom and farm separated it from the life of the surrounding community. New buildings were added as the twentieth century progressed. In 1963 a new chapel, called the Verdon chapel, was completed and the remains of Bishop Verdon were reinterred there during a Pontifical Requiem Mass offered by Archbishop Liston The function of preparation for entering Holy Cross College was fulfilled from 1947 by the founding of Holy Name Seminary, Christchurch, a minor seminary operated by the Jesuits. From 1954, this seminary assumed responsibility for teaching the Philosophy section of the seminary curriculum as a major seminary. The monastic and separatist ideal was challenged after the Second Vatican Council and the publication of Gaudium et spes ("the Pastoral Constitution on the Church in the Modern World"). The emphasis changed to interaction with the world. The college collaborated with the University of Otago in the introduction of Bachelor of Theology degree and courses in pastoral studies were introduced in addition to the traditional focus on theology and philosophy. The college was staffed by secular clergy and others until 1934 and then by the Vincentian order until 1989. In the 98 years that the college was at Mosgiel (1900-1997) it had 1302 students. Of those, 648 were ordained at the end of their studies as priests.

== Move to Auckland ==
From the 1980s the college had fewer enrolments. Also there had been a negative review carried out by the University of Otago of the courses offered by Holy Cross College which greatly diminished the Bishops' commitment to staying at Mosgiel. The population of New Zealand was becoming increasingly located in the North Island. The Bishops decided to move the seminary to Auckland to join the Marist seminary already relocated there a few years previously. The main reasons given for the shift were the possibility of finding it easier to get qualified staff and also the need for the seminary to be more open to Maori and Pacific cultures (heavily concentrated in Auckland and the north). Holy Cross Seminary opened in Ponsonby, Auckland for the 1998 academic year. Lectures are undertaken at Good Shepherd College which is located near Holy Cross Seminary and is jointly staffed by Diocesan Clergy, clergy of the Society of Mary and members of other Catholic religious congregations.

== Alumni ==
Most New Zealand Catholic secular priests ordained since 1900 are graduates of Holy Cross College.

== See also ==
- Good Shepherd College
- Marist Seminary
- Holy Name Seminary
- St Mary's Seminary
- Roman Catholicism in New Zealand

== External sources ==
- Holy Cross Seminary, Auckland website
