= Te Kupenga – Catholic Theological College =

Catholic tertiary college in New Zealand

Coordinates: 36.8534°S 174.7432°E

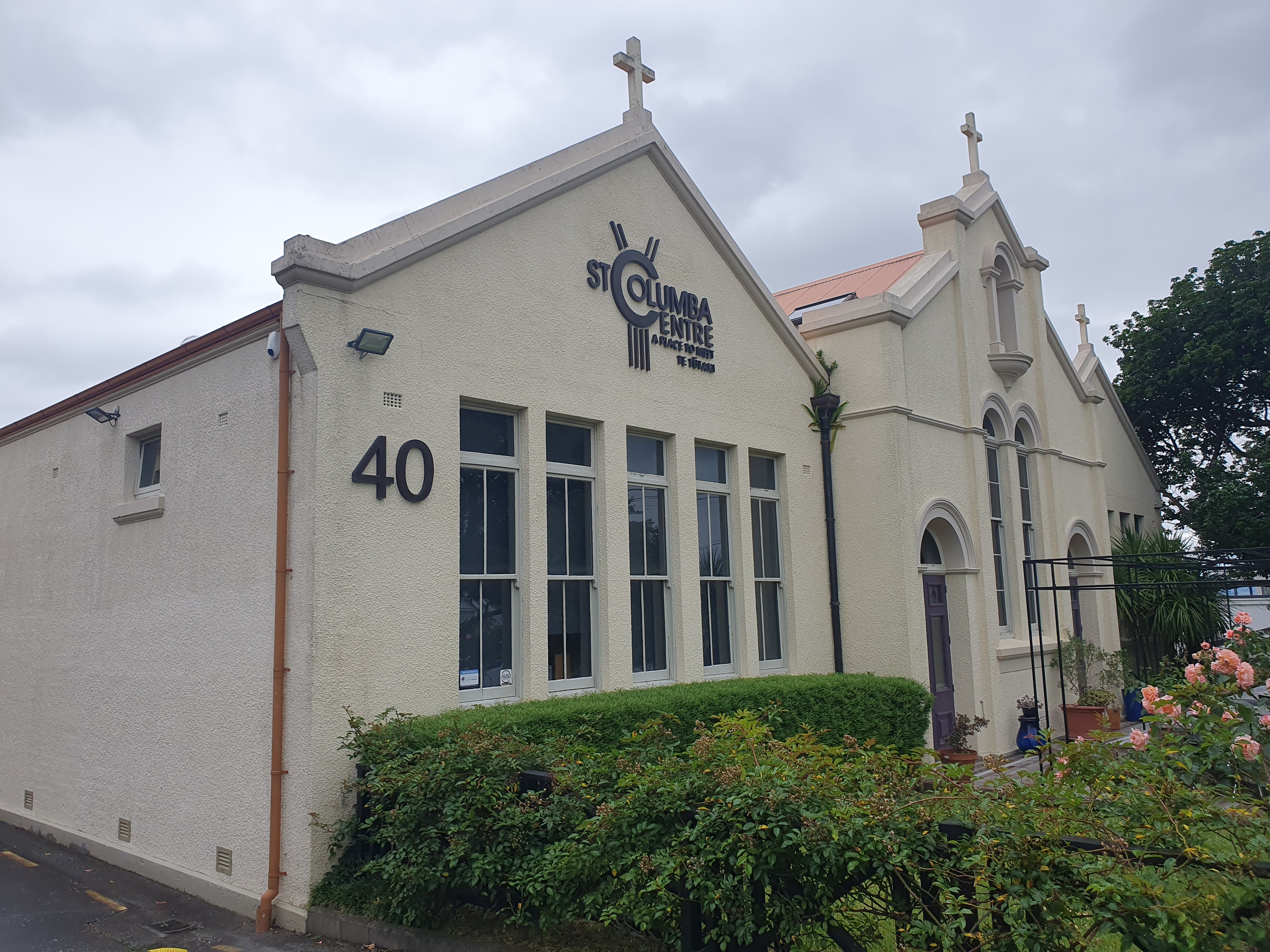
The St Columba Centre, part of the new campus for Te Kupenga – Catholic Theological College

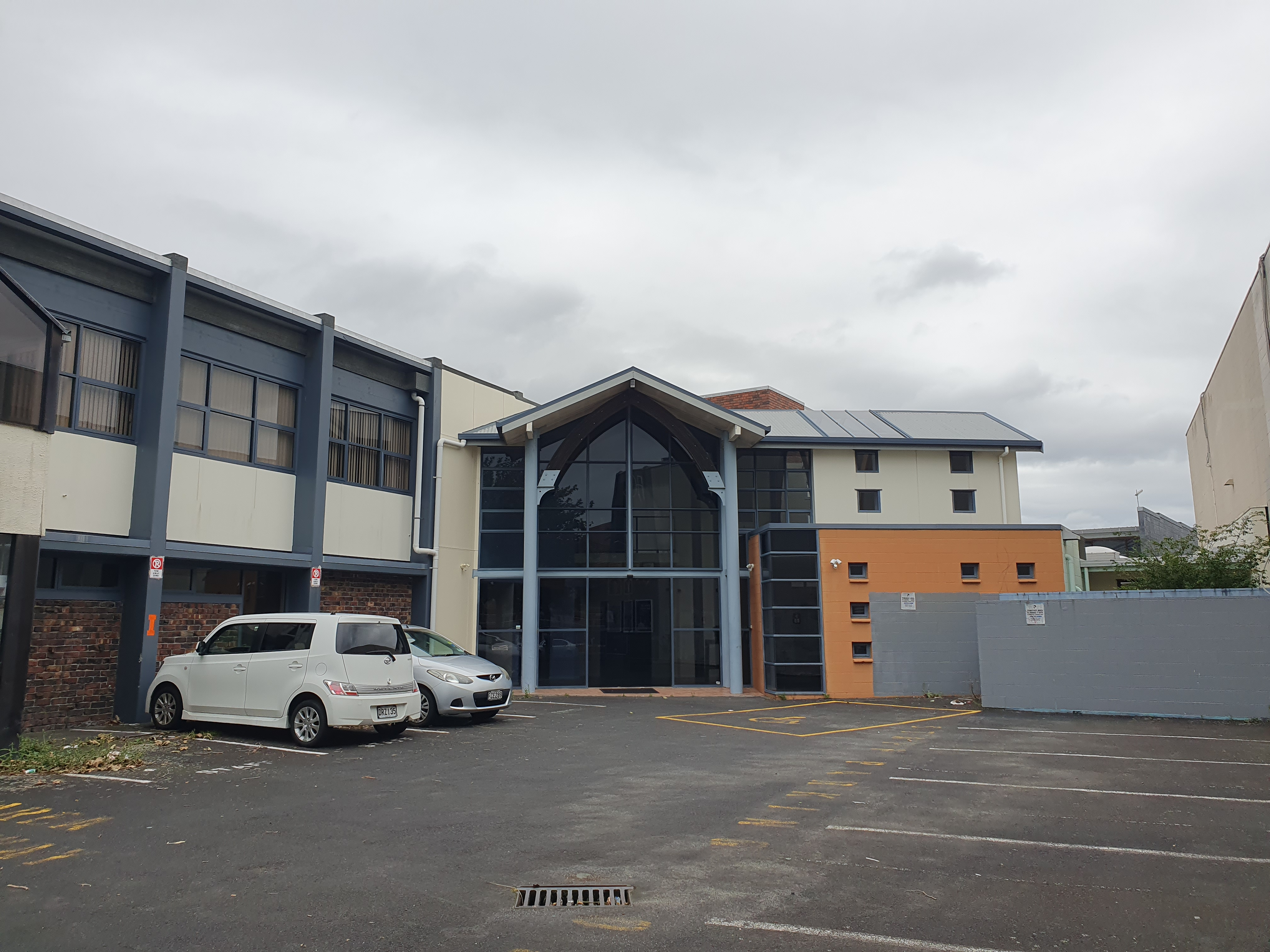
The former Good Shepherd College campus

Te Kupenga – Catholic Theological College is a Catholic theological college located in Ponsonby, Auckland, New Zealand, replacing Good Shepherd College, founded in 1998. It arose from the relocation to Auckland of Holy Cross College (the National Catholic Seminary for the training of secular priests) in 1998, and of Mount St Mary's College, Greenmeadows (the seminary, formerly located near Napier, for the training of priests of the Marist order) in 1992. The resources of the seminaries were pooled to set up Good Shepherd College for the formal academic philosophic and theological training of priests and others in New Zealand.

On 1 January 2020, the Good Shepherd College and the Catholic Institute merged to create Te Kupenga – Catholic Leadership Institute, which moved to 40 Vermont Street, Ponsonby, adjacent to the Holy Cross College.

== See also ==
- Holy Name Seminary
- St Mary's Seminary
