= List of Catholic schools in New Zealand =

This is a list of the schools and colleges run by, or in association with, the Roman Catholic Church in New Zealand (including one private traditionalist Roman Catholic school).

== Auckland Diocese ==
Name	Website	MOE	Years	Gender	Area	Authority	Decile	Roll
Christ The King School	-	1245	1-8	Coed	Mount Roskill	State integrated	3	123
Holy Cross School		1316	1-8	Coed	Henderson	State integrated	4	481
Holy Cross School		1315	1-8	Coed	Papatoetoe	State integrated	2	596
Good Shepherd School	-	1297	1-6	Coed	Balmoral	State integrated	8	200
Marist School		1360	1-8	Coed	Herne Bay	State integrated	7	153
Marist School		1359	1-6	Coed	Mount Albert	State integrated	7	293
Mary MacKillop School	-	1633	1-8	Coed	Māngere	State integrated	1	322
Monte Cecilia School		1376	1-8	Coed	Mount Roskill	State integrated	6	195
Mount Carmel School	-	1382	1-6	Coed	Meadowbank	State integrated	9	249
Our Lady of the Sacred Heart School	-	1411	1-6	Coed	Epsom	State integrated	10	228
Our Lady Star of the Sea School		1514	1-6	Coed	Howick	State integrated	9	583
Pompallier School		1082	1–8	Coed	Kaitaia	State integrated	3	165
Sancta Maria Catholic Primary School		618	1-6	Coed	Flat Bush	State integrated		
St Anne's School		1486	1-8	Coed	Manurewa	State integrated	2	537
St Dominic's School		1487	1-8	Coed	Blockhouse Bay	State integrated	6	219
St Francis School	-	1488	1-6	Coed	Point Chevalier	State integrated	7	210
St Francis Xavier School		1588	1–6	Coed	Whau Valley	State integrated	6	473
St Ignatius School	-	1490	1-6	Coed	Saint Heliers	State integrated	10	200
St John's School		1492	1–6	Coed	Mairangi Bay	State integrated	10	315
St John The Evangelist School	-	1491	1-8	Coed	Ōtara	State integrated	1	291
St Josephs School		1098	1–8	Coed	Dargaville	State integrated	3	106
St Joseph's School		1493	1-8	Coed	Grey Lynn	State integrated	4	102
St Joseph's School		1494	1-8	Coed	Onehunga	State integrated	3	277
St Joseph's School		1495	1-6	Coed	Ōrākei	State integrated	5	83
St Joseph's School	-	1496	1-8	Coed	Otahuhu	State integrated	2	297
St Joseph's School		1497	1-8	Coed	Pukekohe	State integrated	7	368
St Joseph's School		1498	1–6	Coed	Takapuna	State integrated	9	355
St Leo's School	-	1500	1–6	Coed	Devonport	State integrated	10	124
St Mark's Catholic School		1501	1-6	Coed	Pakuranga	State Integrated	8	276
St Mary's School	-	1503	1-8	Coed	Avondale	State integrated	3	261
St Mary's School	-	1504	1-8	Coed	Ellerslie	State integrated	6	255
St Mary's School		1505	1–8	Coed	Northcote	State integrated	7	402
St Mary's School		1502	1-6	Coed	Papakura	State integrated	4	311
St Michael's School		1506	1-6	Coed	Remuera	State integrated	10	242
St Patrick's School		1507	1-8	Coed	Panmure	State integrated	2	145
St Paul's School	-	1643	1-6	Coed	Massey North	State integrated	5	323
St Pius X School	-	1508	1-8	Coed	Glen Innes	State integrated	1	161
St Therese School	-	1509	1-8	Coed	Three Kings	State integrated	2	129
Star of the Sea School		1514	1-6	Coed	Howick	State Integrated	9	583
Stella Maris Primary School		1663	1–8	Coed	Silverdale	State integrated	10	334
Te Kura o Hata Maria o Pawarenga	-	1102	1-8	Coed	Pawarenga	State integrated	2	34
Te Kura o Hato Hohepa Te Kamura	-	1100	1–8	Coed	Whangaroa Harbour	State integrated	1	18

== Hamilton Diocese ==
Name	Website	MOE	Years	Gender	Area	Authority	Decile	Roll
Bishop Edward Gaines Catholic School	-	1607	1-8	Coed	Tokoroa	State integrated	4	46
Marian Catholic School		2094	1-8	Coed	Hamilton	State integrated	7	591
St Anthony's Catholic School		1943	1-8	Coed	Huntly	State integrated	2	88
St Columba's Catholic School		1944	1-8	Coed	Frankton	State integrated	6	417
St Joseph's Catholic School		1946	1-8	Coed	Fairfield	State integrated	8	357
St Joseph's Catholic School	-	1947	1-8	Coed	Matamata	State integrated	3	27
St Joseph's Catholic School	-	1948	1-8	Coed	Matatā	State integrated	2	23
St Joseph's Catholic School	-	1949	1-8	Coed	Morrinsville	State integrated	8	187
St Joseph's Catholic School		1950	1-8	Coed	Ōpōtiki	State integrated	2	191
St Joseph's Catholic School		1951	1-8	Coed	Paeroa	State integrated	4	45
St Joseph's Catholic School	-	1952	1-8	Coed	Te Aroha	State integrated	5	101
St Joseph's Catholic School	-	1953	1-8	Coed	Te Kūiti	State integrated	4	107
St Joseph's Catholic School		1954	1-8	Coed	Waihi	State integrated	3	50
St Joseph's Catholic School		1955	1-8	Coed	Whakatāne	State integrated	6	274
St Mary's Catholic School		2680	1–6	Coed	Gisborne	State integrated	5	222
St Mary's Catholic School	-	1880	1-8	Coed	Ōtorohanga	State integrated	5	42
St Mary's Catholic School	-	1957	1-8	Coed	Putāruru	State integrated	4	198
St Mary's Catholic School		1958	1-6	Coed	Rotorua	State integrated	5	404
St Mary's Catholic School		1959	1-6	Coed	Tauranga	State integrated	9	396
St Michael's Catholic School		1960	1-6	Coed	Western Heights	State integrated	3	140
St Patrick's Catholic School		1750	1-8	Coed	Taupō	State integrated	7	218
St Patrick's Catholic School		1961	1-8	Coed	Taumarunui	State integrated	4	61
St Patrick's Catholic School		1962	1-8	Coed	Te Awamutu	State integrated	7	273
St Paul's Catholic School		1963	1-8	Coed	Ngāruawāhia	State integrated	3	117
St Peter Chanel Catholic School		1964	1-8	Coed	Te Rapa	State integrated	8	247
St Peter's Catholic School		1965	1-8	Coed	Cambridge	State integrated	9	172
St Pius X Catholic School		1966	1-8	Coed	Melville	State integrated	4	146
St Thomas More Catholic School	-	1636	1-6	Coed	Bayfair	State integrated	7	172

== Palmerston North Diocese ==
Name	Website	MOE	Years	Gender	Area	Authority	Decile	Roll
Our Lady of Lourdes School		2416	1-6	Coed	Palmerston North	State integrated	4	133
Reignier School		2663	1-6	Coed	Greenmeadows	State integrated	8	287
St Annes School		2447	1-8	Coed	Wanganui	State integrated	7	262
St Anthony's School		2998	1-8	Coed	Pahiatua	State integrated	6	97
St Anthonys School	-	1585	1-8	Coed	Wanganui	Private	3	90
St James School		2449	1-6	Coed	Hokowhitu	State integrated	10	213
St John Bosco School		2233	1–6	Coed	Fitzroy	State integrated	8	191
St Joseph's School	-	2676	1-8	Coed	Dannevirke	State integrated	5	138
St Joseph's School	-	2451	1-8	Coed	Feilding	State integrated	6	124
St Joseph's School		2677	1-8	Coed	Akina	State integrated	3	200
St Joseph's School	-	2235	1–8	Coed	Hāwera	State integrated	6	269
St Joseph's School		2236	1–6	Coed	Lynmouth	State integrated	7	155
St Joseph's School		2237	1–8	Coed	Ōpunake	State integrated	6	122
St Joseph's School		2452	1–6	Coed	Pātea	State integrated	1	25
St Joseph's School	-	2238	1–8	Coed	Stratford	State integrated	6	209
St Joseph's School	-	2453	1-8	Coed	Taihape	State integrated	5	101
St Joseph's School	-	2678	1-8	Coed	Waipukurau	State integrated	5	143
St Joseph's School	-	2679	1-8	Coed	Wairoa	State integrated	3	128
St Joseph's School	-	2239	1–8	Coed	Waitara	State integrated	2	178
St Marcellin School		2395	1-8	Coed	Wanganui	State integrated	3	174
St Mary's School	-	2455	1-8	Coed	Foxton	State integrated	3	49
St Mary's School		2681	1-8	Coed	Mahora	State integrated	4	335
St Mary's School		2457	1-6	Coed	Palmerston North	State integrated	6	151
St Mary's School	-	2454	1-8	Coed	Wanganui	State integrated	4	232
St Matthew's Primary School		1608	1-8	Coed	Hastings	State integrated	3	130
St Matthew's School	-	2456	1-8	Coed	Marton	State integrated	4	79
St Patrick's School	-	2241	1–8	Coed	Inglewood	State integrated	5	39
St Patrick's School		2240	1–8	Coed	Kaponga	State integrated	5	33
St Patrick's School		2745	1-8	Coed	Marewa	State integrated	4	405
St Pius X School		2242	1–6	Coed	Brooklands	State integrated	8	108

== Wellington Archdiocese ==
Name	Website	MOE	Years	Gender	Area	Authority	Decile	Roll
Cardinal McKeefry Catholic Primary School		2819	1-8	Coed	Wilton	State integrated	10	
Holy Cross School		2904	1-8	Coed	Miramar	State integrated	5	177
Holy Family School		2859	1-6	Coed	Cannons Creek	State integrated	1	154
Our Lady of Rosary School		2941	1-8	Coed	Waiwhetu	State integrated	6	265
Sacred Heart School		2984	1-8	Coed	Petone	State integrated	6	153
Sacred Heart School		3219	1-8	Coed	Reefton	State integrated	4	21
Sacred Heart Cathedral School	-	2985	1-8	Coed	Thorndon	State integrated	9	232
San Antonio School		2986	1-8	Coed	Eastbourne	State integrated	10	
St Anne's School	-	2997	1-8	Coed	Newtown	State integrated	4	220
St Anthony's School	-	2999	1-8	Coed	Seatoun	State integrated	8	35
St Benedict's School		3000	1-8	Coed	Khandallah	State integrated	10	209
St Bernadette's School	-	3001	1-8	Coed	Naenae	State integrated	2	125
St Bernard's School		3002	1-8	Coed	Brooklyn	State integrated	9	
St Brendan's School		3004	1-8	Coed	Heretaunga	State integrated	8	277
St Brigid's School		3005	1-8	Coed	Johnsonville	State integrated	9	290
St Canice's School	-	3220	1–8	Coed	Westport	State integrated	4	142
St Claudine Thevenet School		3018	1-8	Coed	Wainuiomata	State integrated	4	189
St Francis De Sales School	-	3006	1-8	Coed	Island Bay	State integrated	9	196
St Francis Xavier School	-	3007	1-6	Coed	Tawa	State integrated	9	157
St Joseph's School	-	3530	1-8	Coed	Kaikōura	State integrated	5	110
St Joseph's School	-	3008	1-8	Coed	Levin	State integrated	2	184
St Josephs School		3221	1-8	Coed	Nelson	State integrated	8	356
St Joseph's School	-	3009	1–6	Coed	Picton	State integrated	5	
St Joseph's School		3011	1-8	Coed	Upper Hutt	State integrated	7	552
St Mary's School	-	3012	1-8	Coed	Blenheim	State integrated	8	171
St Mary's School		3013	1-8	Coed	Carterton	State integrated	6	134
St Michael's School		3015	1-8	Coed	Taitā	State integrated	1	127
St Patrick's School	-	3019	1-6	Coed	Kilbirnie	State integrated	5	125
St Patrick's School	-	3016	1-6	Coed	Masterton	State Integrated	5	217
Our Lady of Kapiti School		3017	1-8	Coed	Paraparaumu	State integrated	8	300
St Paul's School	-	1627	1-8	Coed	Richmond	State integrated	9	362
St Peter Chanel School	-	3222	1-8	Coed	Motueka	State integrated	5	90
St Peter Chanel School		3020	1-8	Coed	Otaki	State integrated	3	20
Sts Peter and Paul School		3021	1-8	Coed	Lower Hutt	State integrated	8	442
St Pius X School	-	3022	1-6	Coed	Titahi Bay	State integrated	4	16
St Teresas School		3023	1-8	Coed	Featherston	State integrated	7	117
St Teresa's School		3024	1-8	Coed	Karori	State integrated	10	125
St Theresa's School		3025	1-6	Coed	Plimmerton	State integrated	10	199

== Christchurch Diocese ==
Name	Website	MOE	Years	Gender	Area	Authority	Decile	Roll
Christ The King School		3316	1-8	Coed	Burnside	State integrated	9	324
New Brighton Catholic School	-	3445	1-8	Coed	New Brighton	State integrated	5	178
Our Lady of Assumption School		3461	1-8	Coed	Hoon Hay	State integrated	8	223
Our Lady of Fatima School	-	3460	1-8	Coed	Mairehau	State integrated	7	252
Our Lady of Snows School	-	3462	1-8	Coed	Methven	State integrated	10	35
Our Lady of Victories		3463	1-8	Coed	Sockburn	State integrated	8	242
Sacred Heart School	-	3270	1-8	Coed	Christchurch	State integrated	3	126
Sacred Heart School		3498	1-8	Coed	Timaru	State integrated	5	183
St Albans Catholic School		3517	1-6	Coed	St Albans	State integrated	10	96
St Andrew's School		3519	1-8	Coed	St Andrews	State integrated	5	96
St Anne's School	-	3520	1-8	Coed	Woolston	State integrated	3	141
St Bernadette's School		3521	1-8	Coed	Hornby	State integrated	3	153
St James School		3523	1-6	Coed	Aranui	State integrated	1	106
St Joseph's School		3527	1-8	Coed	Ashburton	State integrated	8	213
St Joseph's School	-	3529	1-8	Coed	Fairlie	State integrated	7	50
St Joseph's School		3531	1-8	Coed	Papanui	State integrated	9	383
St Joseph's School	-	3528	1-8	Coed	Pleasant Point	State integrated	7	88
St Joseph's School	-	3532	1-8	Coed	Temuka	State integrated	5	90
St Joseph's School		3533	1-8	Coed	Timaru	State integrated	7	201
St Joseph's School		4132	1-8	Coed	Rangiora	State integrated	9	132
St Mark's School		4135	1-8	Coed	Opawa	State integrated	10	221
St Mary's School	-	3535	1-8	Coed	Christchurch	State integrated	4	102
St Mary's School	-	3536	1–8	Coed	Hokitika	State integrated	5	116
St Patrick's School		3537	1-8	Coed	Bryndwr	State integrated	10	166
St Patrick's School	-	3538	1–8	Coed	Greymouth	State integrated	5	134
St Patrick's School		3540	1-8	Coed	Kaiapoi	State integrated	8	169
St Patrick's School	-	3539	1-8	Coed	Waimate	State integrated	3	57
St Paul's School		3541	1-8	Coed	Dallington	State integrated	7	287
St Peter's School		3542	1-6	Coed	Beckenham	State integrated	9	116
St Teresa's School		3543	1-8	Coed	Christchurch	State integrated	7	134
Star of the Sea School		3544	1-8	Coed	Sumner	State integrated	10	106

== Dunedin Diocese ==
Name	Website	MOE	Years	Gender	Area	Authority	Decile	Roll
Holy Family School		557	1-8	Coed	Wānaka	State integrated	10	70
Sacred Heart School		3815	1-6	Coed	North East Valley	State integrated	7	52
Sacred Heart School	-	4013	1-6	Coed	Waikiwi	State integrated	9	158
St Bernadette's School		3819	1-6	Coed	Forbury	State integrated	5	113
St Brigid's School		3820	1-6	Coed	Tainui	State integrated	10	99
St Francis Xavier School		3822	1-6	Coed	Mornington	State integrated	8	97
St Gerard's School	-	3823	1-8	Coed	Alexandra	State integrated	9	116
St John's School	-	3824	1-8	Coed	Ranfurly	State integrated	7	41
St Joseph's Cathedral School		3827	1-6	Coed	City Rise	State integrated	8	152
St Joseph's School	-	3826	1-8	Coed	Balclutha	State integrated	7	51
St Joseph's School	-	4017	1-8	Coed	Invercargill	State integrated	3	64
St Joseph's School		3825	1-8	Coed	Oamaru	State integrated	6	189
St Joseph's School	-	3828	1-8	Coed	Port Chalmers	State integrated	7	26
St Joseph's School		4016	1-8	Coed	Queenstown	State integrated	10	151
St Mary's School		3830	1-6	Coed	Wakari	State integrated	6	36
St Mary's School		4018	1-6	Coed	Gore	State integrated	7	167
St Mary's School	-	3831	1-6	Coed	Milton	State integrated	4	89
St Mary's School	-	3832	1-8	Coed	Mosgiel	State integrated	8	145
St Patrick's School		3833	1-6	Coed	South Dunedin	State integrated	3	5
St Patrick's School		4020	1-6	Coed	Georgetown	State integrated	3	258
St Patrick's School	-	4019	1-8	Coed	Nightcaps	State integrated	2	47
St Peter Chanel School		3834	1-8	Coed	Green Island	State integrated	8	80
St Teresa's School	-	4021	1-8	Coed	Bluff	State integrated	3	36
St Theresa's School		4022	1-6	Coed	Invercargill	State integrated	8	264
St Thomas School	-	4023	1-8	Coed	Winton	State integrated	8	84

== Secondary schools ==
Name	Website	MOE	Years	Gender	Area	Authority	Roll
Aquinas College		482	7–13	Coed	Pyes Pa	State integrated	840
Baradene College of the Sacred Heart		61	7–13	Girls	Remuera	State integrated	1,531
Bishop Viard College		256	7–13	Coed	Porirua	State integrated	398
Campion College		211	7–13	Coed	Gisborne	State integrated	478
Carmel College		35	7–13	Girls	Milford	State integrated	1,100
Catholic Cathedral College		531	7–13	Coed	Christchurch	State integrated	601
Chanel College		244	7–13	Coed	Masterton	State Integrated	342
Cullinane College	-	190	9–13	Coed	Wanganui	State integrated	495
De La Salle College		94	7–13	Boys	Māngere East	State integrated	971
Francis Douglas Memorial College		175	7–13	Boys	Westown	State integrated	791
Garin College		6975	7–13	Coed	Nelson	State integrated	634
Hato Paora College		199	9–13	Boys	Feilding	State integrated	113
Hato Petera College		33	9–13	Coed	Northcote	State integrated	
John Paul College		532	7–13	Coed	Rotorua	State integrated	1,098
John Paul II High School		304	9–13	Coed	Greymouth	State integrated	191
Liston College		46	7–13	Boys	Henderson North	State integrated	856
Marcellin College		63	7–13	Coed	Epsom	State integrated	466
Marian College		343	9–13	Girls	Shirley	State integrated	430
Marist College		70	7–13	Girls	Mount Albert	State integrated	766
McAuley High School		90	9–13	Girls	Otahuhu	State integrated	770
Pompallier Catholic College		17	7–13	Coed	Maunu	State integrated	650
Roncalli College		358	9–13	Coed	Timaru	State integrated	517
Rosmini College		39	7–13	Boys	Takapuna	State integrated	1,208
Sacred Heart College		59	7–13	Boys	Glen Innes	State integrated	1,511
Sacred Heart College		262	9–13	Girls	Lower Hutt	State integrated	829
Sacred Heart College		219	9–13	Girls	Napier	State integrated	354
Sacred Heart Girls College		139	9–13	Girls	Hamilton	State integrated	937
Sacred Heart Girls' College		174	7–13	Girls	Fitzroy	State integrated	737
Sancta Maria College		491	7–13	Coed	Botany Downs	State Integrated	1,049
St Bede's College		315	9–13	Boys	Papanui	State integrated	802
St. Bernard's College		260	7–13	Boys	Lower Hutt	State integrated	677
St Catherine's College		284	9–13	Girls	Kilbirnie	State integrated	209
St Dominic's Catholic College		47	7–13	Girls	Henderson North	State integrated	851
St Dominic's College	-	454	9–13	Coed	Gonville	Private	51
St Ignatius Loyola Catholic College	-	[https://www.educationcounts.govt.nz/find-school.	7-13	Coed	Drury	State integrated	900 (projected)
St John's College		136	9–13	Boys	Hillcrest	State integrated	956
St John's College		226	9–13	Boys	Hastings	State integrated	406
St Joseph's Māori Girls' College		222	9–13	Girls	Taradale	State integrated	180
St Kevin's College		369	9–13	Coed	Oamaru	State integrated	483
St Mary's College		50	7–13	Girls	Ponsonby	State integrated	998
St Mary's College		286	9–13	Girls	Wellington City	State integrated	558
St. Patrick's College		252	9–13	Boys	Silverstream	State integrated	750
St. Patrick's College		276	9–13	Boys	Kilbirnie	State integrated	717
St Paul's College		51	7–13	Boys	Ponsonby	State integrated	395
St Peter's College		62	7–13	Boys	Grafton	State integrated	1,318
St Peter's College		397	7–13	Coed	Gore	State integrated	350
St Peter's College		204	7–13	Coed	Palmerston North	State integrated	787
St Thomas of Canterbury College		331	9–13	Boys	Sockburn	State integrated	700
Trinity Catholic College		536	7–13	Coed	City Rise	State integrated	867
Verdon College		408	7–13	Coed	Invercargill	State integrated	696
Villa Maria College		326	7–13	Girls	Upper Riccarton	State integrated	829
