= Charles Drennan =

21st-century Catholic bishop

The Most Reverend Charles Drennan
- Bishop emeritus of Palmerston North
- Province: Wellington
- Diocese: Palmerston North
- Installed: 17 March 2012
- Term ended: 4 October 2019
- Predecessor: Peter Cullinane
- Successor: John Adams

Orders
- Ordination: 14 June 1996
- Consecration: 11 June 2011

Personal details
- Born: Charles Edward Drennan; 23 August 1960 (age 66) Christchurch, New Zealand
- Denomination: Roman Catholic Church
- Residence: Palmerston North
- Occupation: Roman Catholic bishop
- Profession: Cleric
- Education: Holy Cross Seminary, Mosgiel, New Zealand; Pontifical Urbaniana University, Rome; Pontifical Gregorian University, Rome
- Motto: "caritas congaudet veritati" (love delights in the truth)

Charles Edward Drennan (born 23 August 1960 in Christchurch, New Zealand) is a New Zealand Bishop who was formerly the second Bishop of Palmerston North, New Zealand, from 2012 to 2019. On 4 October 2019 he resigned his position. Two allegations of "unacceptable behaviour" of a sexual nature were made. An investigation by the Catholic Church's New Zealand Office for Professional Standards found that the behaviour was unacceptable for a Catholic bishop but not criminal in nature.

== Early life ==
Drennan was raised by an Anglican father and a Catholic mother. He attended Ilam School, St Teresa's School (Riccarton), Kirkwood Intermediate School and Christ's College. At St Teresa's, the nine-year-old Drennan was introduced by a teacher to the book Promises to Keep by Dr Tom Dooley about the Vietnam War. This book impressed Drennan, who was even then thinking of becoming a priest, with the notion of service.

After finishing university Drennan spent a three-year period travelling overseas and worked for a period in a Ryder-Cheshire home in India for tuberculosis patients, special needs adults and children whose parents had leprosy. There he made the decision to become a Roman Catholic priest. He studied for the priesthood at Holy Cross Seminary, Mosgiel, for two years before being sent by his bishop, Basil Meeking of Christchurch, to Rome to complete his training at the Pontifical Urbaniana University. He later took postgraduate studies at the Pontifical Gregorian University.

== Priesthood ==
Drennan was ordained a priest in Rome for the Diocese of Christchurch on 14 June 1996. Drennan also became an Ascribed Rosminian – he belongs to the Institute of Charity (Rosminians) as a diocesan priest. He returned to New Zealand and served as a priest in the parishes of Hoon Hay and Timaru.

After Drennan's post-graduate study in Rome, he was on the staff of Holy Cross Seminary and Good Shepherd College in Auckland. He was then invited to work in the Vatican's Secretariat of State where he spent seven years. His main role was writing speeches and talks for the Pope. Drennan's period there covered the final years of Pope John Paul II and the election and first four years of Pope Benedict XVI.

Drennan said that working at the Vatican was "intense, finely focused and hugely stimulating. I met some wonderful people there – priests and lay, working in the Vatican". At the request of Bishop Barry Jones, Drennan returned to Christchurch in 2010. Just before leaving the Vatican, he accompanied the Pope on a visit to the Czech Republic, during which they discussed the Church in New Zealand. In Christchurch, Drennan held the title of Monsignor and the position of Diocesan Chancellor of the Diocese of Christchurch.

Drennan also held the positions of Administrator of Blessed Sacrament Cathedral, Parish Priest of St Anne's Parish, Woolston, and chair of the Council of Priests.

== Episcopacy ==
Drennan was appointed coadjutor bishop of Palmerston North by Pope Benedict XVI on 22 February 2011. He chose as his motto caritas congaudet veritati (love delights in the truth), taken from the First Letter of St Paul to the Corinthians, chapter 13. He was consecrated on 11 June 2011 in the Cathedral of the Holy Spirit, Palmerston North. His principal consecrator was his future predecessor, Bishop Peter Cullinane of Palmerston North and the principal co-consecrators were Bishop Barry Jones of Christchurch and Archbishop Mark Coleridge of Canberra-Goulburn. Drennan succeeded to the see on 22 February 2012, upon the retirement of Peter Cullinane. His installation took place at the Cathedral of the Holy Spirit on 17 March 2012.

On 7 March 2015, Drennan joined with other protestors in a demonstration in Palmerston North in relation to the Trans-Pacific Partnership (TPP). In a speech to the 500 protestors in The Square, he said: "Absolute freedom is not in our interests." "It most certainly is not a right of global business interests to trump the duty of an elected government to govern a nation's economy in accord with the wishes of that nation's citizens." Drennan also denounced the secrecy of the TPP negotiations.

Drennan was a member of the executive committee of the Federation of Catholic Bishops Conferences of Oceania and a bishop member of the board of the New Zealand Catholic Education Office Ltd. He served as a member of the New Zealand Catholic Bishops Conference Commission until his resignation in October 2019.

Catholic Church titles
Preceded by -	Coadjutor Bishop of Palmerston North; 2011–2012	Succeeded by -
Preceded by Peter Cullinane	2nd Bishop of Palmerston North; 2012–2019	Succeeded by John Adams
