= Mladen Ivančić =

Mladen Ivančić may refer to:

- Mladen Ivančić (footballer) (born 1970), Croatian former football defender and manager
- Mladen Ivančić (film promoter) (born 1955), New Zealand film official of Croatian descent
