= Diocese of Palmerston North =

Latin Catholic ecclesiastic jurisdiction in New Zealand

Diocese of Palmerston North Dioecesis Palmerstonaquiloniana

Catholic
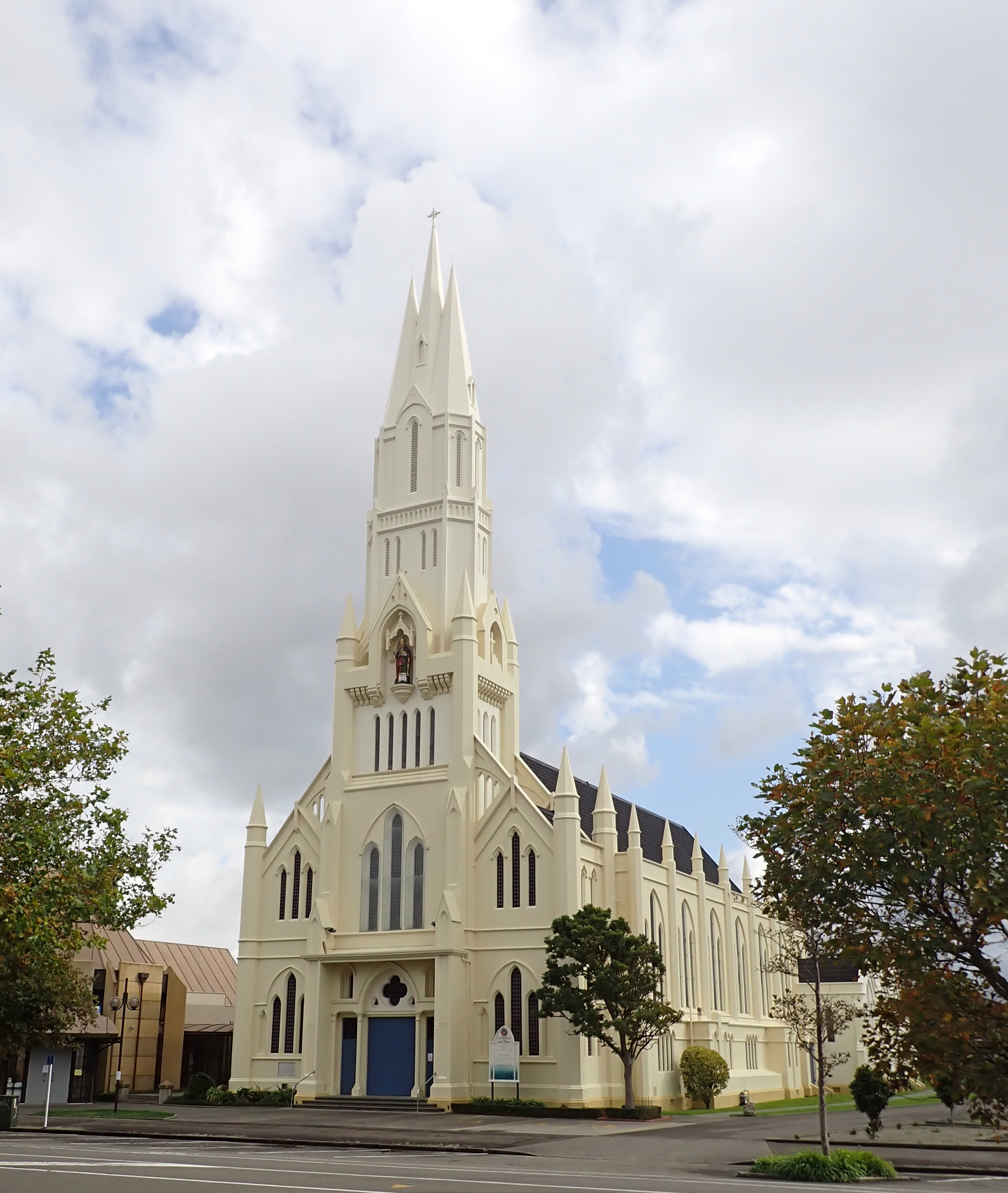
- Cathedral of the Holy Spirit, Palmerston North

Location
- Country: New Zealand
- Territory: Manawatū-Whanganui region
- Episcopal conference: New Zealand Catholic Bishops' Conference
- Ecclesiastical province: Province of Wellington
- Metropolitan: Archdiocese of Wellington
- Coordinates: 40°51′08″S 175°36′58″E

Statistics
- Area: 36,200 km^{2} (14,000 sq mi)
- Population: Total; Catholics: (as of 2023); ▲526,735 (Note: Annuario Pontificio (2023) via Catholic-Hierarchy.org); ▲68,160 (▼12.9%)
- Parishes: ▲31 (2023)

Information
- Denomination: Catholic Church
- Sui iuris church: Latin Church
- Rite: Roman Rite
- Established: 1980; 46 years ago
- Cathedral: Cathedral of the Holy Spirit
- Secular priests: ▼26 (diocesan) (2023); ▼18 (religious); ▲2 (permanent deacons)

Current leadership
- Pope: Leo XIV
- Bishop: John Adams
- Metropolitan Archbishop: Paul Martin
- Bishops emeritus: Peter James Cullinane; Charles Drennan

Website
- pndiocese.org.nz

The Diocese of Palmerston North is Latin Church diocese of the Catholic Church in New Zealand. It is a suffragan diocese of the Archdiocese of Wellington. It was formed on 6 March 1980 when the archdiocese was divided. The diocese has an area of area 36,200 km^{2} (14,000 sq mi) and had, in 2023, 68,160 Catholics, 44 priests (26 diocesan, 18 religious priests), 2 permanent deacons, 76 religious (male and female) out of a total population of 526,735. The cathedral of the diocese is the Cathedral of the Holy Spirit.

== Ordinaries of Palmerston North ==
List of ordinaries of Palmerston North
Tenure	Incumbent	Life
1980–2012	Peter James Cullinane	1936–present
2012–2019	Charles Edward Drennan	1960–present
2019–2023	John Dew (Note: Apostolic Administrator)	1948–present
2023–present	John Adams	1963–present

== Present bishops ==
- John Adams third Bishop of Palmerston North (2023 – incumbent)
- John Cardinal Dew, Apostolic Administrator (2019–2023).
- Charles Edward Drennan (born 1960), second Bishop of Palmerston North (2012–2019); Coadjutor Bishop of Palmerston North (2011–2012).
- Owen John Dolan (born 1928) Coadjutor Bishop Emeritus of Palmerston North (2004–present); Coadjutor Bishop of Palmerston North (1995–2004).
- Peter James Cullinane (born 1936), Bishop Emeritus of Palmerston North (2012–present); first Bishop of Palmerston North (1980–2012).

== Secondary schools ==
- Cullinane College, Wanganui
- Francis Douglas Memorial College, New Plymouth
- Hato Paora College, Feilding
- Sacred Heart College, Napier
- Sacred Heart Girls' College, New Plymouth
- St John's College, Hastings
- St Joseph's Māori Girls' College, Taradale, Napier
- St Peter's College, Palmerston North

== See also ==
- Catholic Church in New Zealand
- Francis Douglas – New Zealand Catholic priest (1910–1943)
- Holy Cross College – Catholic secondary school in New Zealand
- Holy Name Seminary – Catholic seminary in New Zealand
- List of Catholic bishops in New Zealand
- Southern Star Abbey – Cistercian monastery in the North Island, New Zealand
