= Lists of schools in New Zealand =

New Zealand has over 2,500 primary and secondary schools.

State schools and state integrated schools are primarily funded by the central government. Private schools receive a lower level of state funding (about 25% of their costs). See Secondary education in New Zealand for more details.

== Schools by region ==
=== North Island ===
- List of schools in the Auckland Region
- List of schools in the Bay of Plenty Region
- List of schools in the Gisborne District
- List of schools in the Hawke's Bay
- List of schools in Manawatū-Whanganui
- List of schools in the Northland Region
- List of schools in Taranaki
- List of schools in Waikato
- List of schools in the Wellington Region

=== South Island ===
- List of schools in the Canterbury Region
  - List of schools in Christchurch
- List of schools in the Marlborough district
- List of schools in Nelson, New Zealand
- List of schools in Otago
- List of schools in the Southland Region
- List of schools in the Tasman District
- List of schools in the West Coast Region

=== Chatham Islands ===
- List of schools in the Chatham Islands

== Schools by type ==
- List of Catholic schools in New Zealand

== Former schools ==
- Closed schools in the Northland Region

== See also ==
- Education in New Zealand
- Secondary education in New Zealand
- The Correspondence School
- Gifted Education Centre
- List of Catholic schools in New Zealand
