= Gifted Awareness Week =

Unofficial holiday in New Zealand

Gifted Awareness Week is celebrated in New Zealand to draw attention to gifted people and the nature of giftedness. Gifted Awareness Week is held for the full week (Monday–Sunday) including 17 June each year. 17 June is significant because it was the birthday of George Parkyn, the first New Zealander to achieve international recognition in the field of gifted education.

== Event ==
A number of New Zealand charitable trusts and educational institutions contribute to the planning and events associated with Gifted Awareness Day each year. These include The New Zealand Association for Gifted Children, The Gifted Education Centre, The Gifted Kids Programme, REACH Education, Canterbury Association for Gifted Children and Youth, The Christchurch Association for Gifted Education, North Canterbury Support for Gifted and Talented Children, The Otago Association for Gifted Children, Waikato Association for Gifted Children, SAGE: Secondary Auckland Gifted Educators, giftEDnz, Gifted Education Consultant, University on Wheels, and Gifted Education Services.

Gifted Awareness Week activities are varied, including competitions and activities for gifted children, public education about the nature of giftedness and dual exceptionality, and public discussions about the role and responsibilities of schools and government in meeting these needs.

== George Parkyn ==
Professor George William Parkyn (1910–1993), honoured in Gifted Awareness Week, was a New Zealand scholar and educational researcher with an interest in intellectual giftedness, and a founding patron of the New Zealand Association for Gifted Children. In 1948, Parkyn wrote "Children of high intelligence, a New Zealand study", New Zealand's first substantive volume on gifted children and their educational needs. He was a keynote speaker at the first World Council for Gifted and Talented Children Conference, held in London in 1975. Much of his writing is still relevant today. For example, the following passage was written for a speech in 1961 and later published in 1964:

"It is important to recognise that each child is a unique individual, a person in his own right, with his own life to live, with his own wants and needs, his own abilities and interests, his own successes to achieve, his own failures to react to. Together with a recognition of the uniqueness of each individual it is important that ... teachers accept the child for his own sake ... This acceptance implies a willingness to help each child to develop into his own best person ... From a secure base the child ventures out and returns, constantly enlarging his world, and growing up with hope and optimism about the outcome of his encounters with the world."

== Recognition ==
Gifted Awareness Week has been acknowledged by some of New Zealand's major political parties. ACT, the Green Party, and the Labour Party have mentioned Gifted Awareness Week in political blogs. Members of several political parties have visited centres of gifted education during Gifted Awareness Week, and discussion of gifted education has taken place in Parliament.

Significant recognition of the needs of gifted children is still sought, however, including explicit acknowledgement that gifted children come from all backgrounds, have gifts in diverse fields, and may have disabilities alongside their gifts; a cohesive long-term strategy and vision; and compulsory pre-service training in giftedness for all New Zealand teachers.
