= John Adams (bishop) =

New Zealand prelate

The Most Reverend John Adams
- 3rd Bishop of Palmerston North
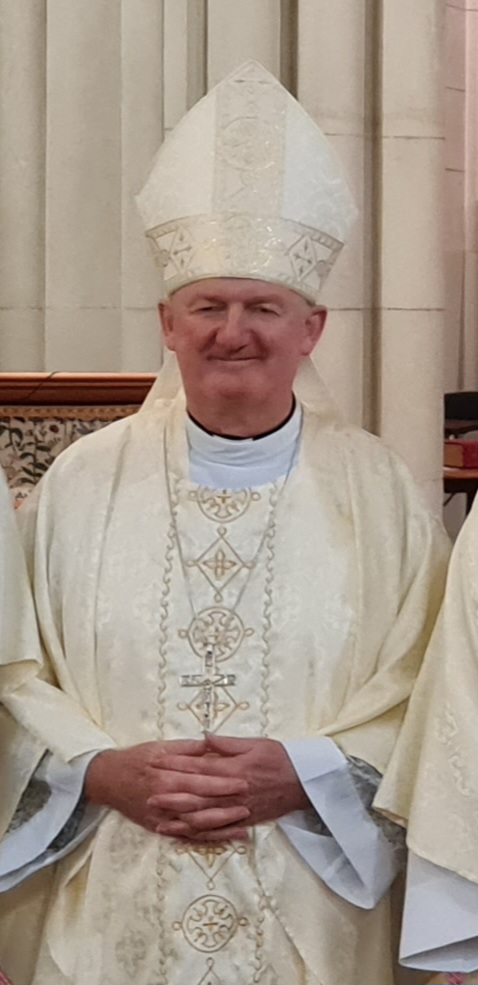
- Adams in 2024
- Archdiocese: Wellington
- Diocese: Palmerston North
- Appointed: 22 June 2023
- Predecessor: Charles Drennan

Orders
- Ordination: 4 July 2003
- Consecration: 30 September 2023 by Stephen Lowe (principal consecrator); Owen Dolan and Peter Cullinane (principal co-consecrators)

Personal details
- Born: John Lewis Adams; 18 November 1963 (age 63) Christchurch, New Zealand
- Denomination: Roman Catholic Church
- Occupation: Roman Catholic bishop
- Profession: Cleric
- Education: St Bede's College
- Alma mater: University of Canterbury Christchurch Technical College University of Auckland Advanced Diploma in Theology, Sydney Good Shepherd House, Christchurch Holy Cross Seminary
- Motto: Show us your light and your truth
- Coat of arms

Styles of John Lewis Adams
- Reference style: The Most Reverend
- Spoken style: Your Grace
- Religious style: Bishop

Ordination history of John Adams
History
Episcopal consecration
- Principal consecrator: Stephen Lowe
- Co-consecrators: Michael Dooley, Michael Gielen (bishop)

John Lewis Adams (born 18 November 1963) is a New Zealand bishop serving as the third bishop of Palmerston North since his appointment by Pope Francis on 22 June 2023. His consecration took place on 30 September 2023.

== Early and personal life ==
Adams was born in Christchurch, New Zealand. His mother trained for five years to be a "an SMSM sister" before leaving and meeting her husband, who was a very proficient snooker player and who had represented New Zealand at the sport. Adams was educated at St Bede's College, Christchurch before attending several tertiary facilities to become a trained teacher. Adams is a keen sportsman. He has played "top class table tennis", "senior cricket" and, as a hunter, he has been helicoptered, with others, "onto the top of the Southern Alps" and spent a week in permanent snow there. He enjoys a game of golf.

Adams trained as a priest at Good Shepherd House, Christchurch in 1995 before moving to the Holy Cross Seminary, Auckland, in 1996.

== Priesthood ==
Adams was ordained as a priest on 4 July 2003 in Christchurch New Zealand. During his time as a priest in the Christchurch Diocese, he held many positions:

- CBS Music President: 2002 – current
- Tertiary Chaplain: 2008 – 2010
- Council of Priests: 2009 – 2023
- Clergy Trust Fund: 2011 – 2021
- Episcopal Vicar for Education: 2013 – 2023
- College of Consultors: 2014 – 2023
- Chair, Council of Priests: 2015 – 2023
- Chair, Education Council: 2015 – 2023

Adams was a priest, assistant priest and administrator in both Christchurch and Greymouth.

- 2003 – 2004: St Teresa's Parish, Riccarton (assistant priest)
- 2004 – 2005: St Patrick's Parish, Greymouth (assistant priest)
- 2005 – 2007: St Patrick's Parish, Greymouth (administrator)
- 2008 – 2010: Christ the King Parish, Burnside (assistant priest)
- 2011 – 2018: St Joseph's Parish, Papanui (parish priest)
- 2019 – 2023: St Peter Chanel Parish, Rangiora (parish priest)

== Episcopacy ==
On 22 June 2023, Adams was appointed as the third bishop of Palmerston North by Pope Francis and he was consecrated and installed on 30 September 2023.

=== Response to clergy abuse ===
In January 2024, Bishop Adams was accused of inappropriately responding to the survivors support network SNAP Aotearoa New Zealand.

Following an interview in July 2024, a reporter wrote that Bishop Adams believed “there ha[d] been a culture change going through the church in the wake of the Royal Commission of Inquiry into Abuse in Care’s final report.” The Royal Commission report, released the previous week, had contained details of abuse at institutions across New Zealand.

== Approach ==
=== Episcopal ministry ===
Adams said that he intended "to take seriously the role of the episcopal ministry of sanctifying, teaching and governing the People of God. So that, to quote the second Vatican Council, we might continue to become 'a people brought into unity from the unity of the Father, the Son and the Holy Spirit.' "

=== Tradition ===
Adams supports the celebration of the Traditional Latin Mass, and offered it himself when he was a parish priest in Rangiora. He has expressed sympathy for the current plight of Traditional Catholics, stating that "The big word at the moment is inclusion, but it tends to only go one way. Traditional Catholics have a terrible time of it at the moment. There’s not much inclusion heading in that direction, it seems to me."

Adams has stated that the church is ever ancient and ever new. "We tend to be rather good at one side of that. We are either on about the ancient, or on about the new. I would like, during my time here, to see a way in which we might live out both those things. There is a deep Catholic instinct to suggest both/and, rather than either/or. And I think the Church does itself or its people no favours when we choose one or the other."

=== Parish renewal ===
Adams has expressed his desire to "go deeply into the issue of parish renewal. What are our parishes like? Are they vibrant places? Are they places where the faith is lived in a deep and ardent way? Are they schools of the spiritual life? Is there a strong desire to evangelise and take - you know, we are custodians of the greatest love story ever told? Are we taking it out to the people, and are they hearing it?" "I think they are important issues and I hope to foster a great sense of parish renewal, if we can do that, during my time here."

Catholic Church titles
Preceded by Charles Drennan	3rd Bishop of Palmerston North; 2023–present	Succeeded by incumbent
