= Georgina Kingi =

New Zealand educator

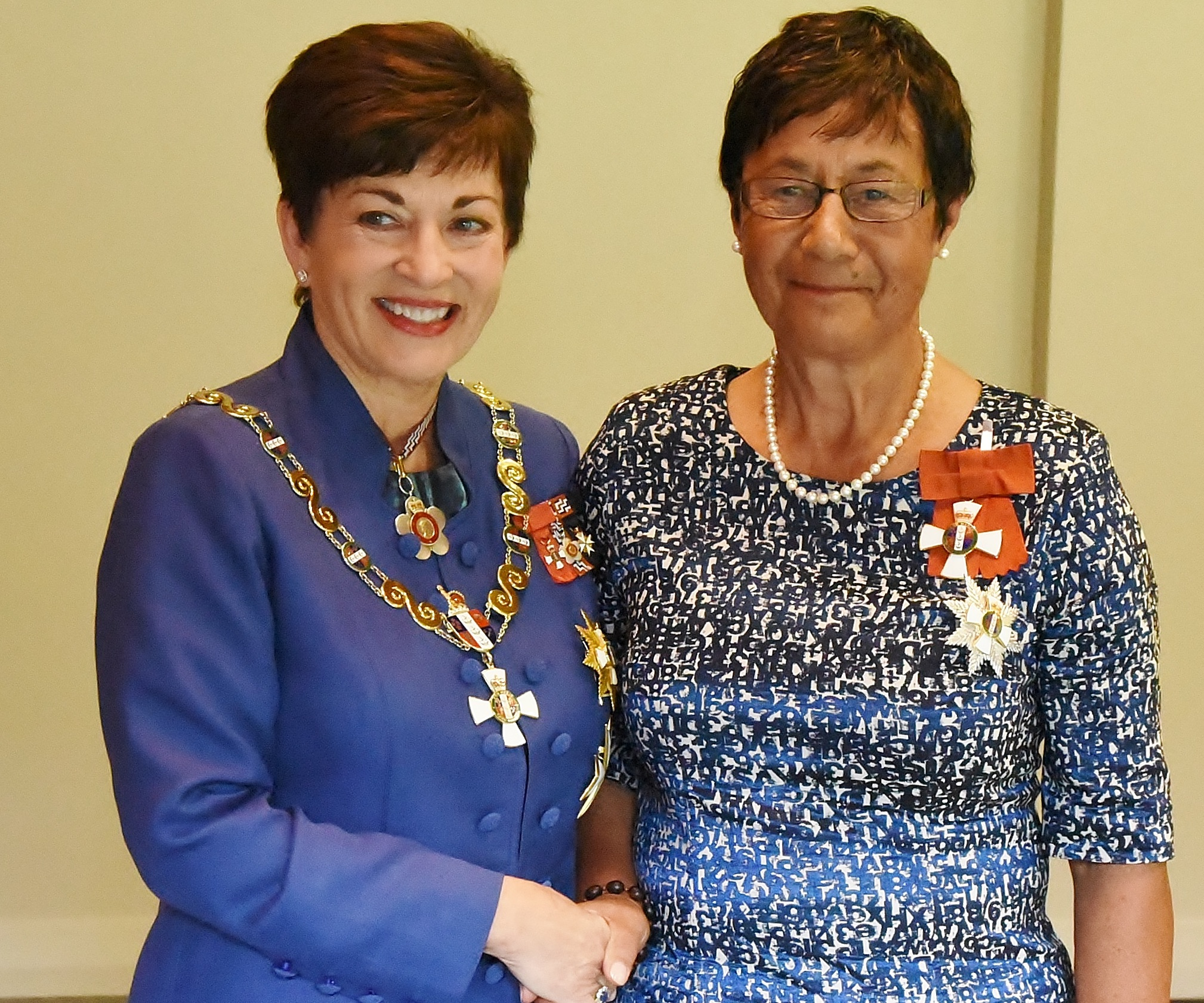
Kingi (right), after her investiture as a Dame Companion of the New Zealand Order of Merit by the Governor-General, Dame Patsy Reddy, on 27 April 2017

Dame Georgina Kingi DNZM QSO is a New Zealand educator who was principal of the St Joseph's Māori Girls' College from 1987 until 2024.

Kingi grew up in Poroporo, near Whakatāne. She is a member of the Ngāti Awa and Ngāti Pūkeko Iwi. She attended St Joseph's and the University of Auckland. Kingi began teaching at St Joseph's in 1969, initially as a Māori language teacher. She became principal of the school in 1987 and retired in 2024.

Kingi is a licensed interpreter of the Māori language. She was a founding member and former chairwoman of the Hawke's Bay Māori Language Association.

In 1993, Kingi was awarded the New Zealand Suffrage Centennial Medal. She was made a Companion of the Queen's Service Order for public services in the 2004 New Year Honours. In the 2017 New Year Honours, she was made a Dame Companion of the New Zealand Order of Merit, for services to Māori and education.

Kingi was appointed to the Māori Education Ministerial Advisory Group by education minister Erica Stanford for a two-year term, starting in September 2024.
