= St Peter's College, Palmerston North =

New Zealand Catholic school

St Peter's College

Location
- 1 Holdsworth Avenue, Milson, Palmerston North, New Zealand; 40.3338°S 175.6054°E

Information
- Type: State-integrated Catholic co-ed composite College (Year 7–13)
- Motto: Ubi Petrus, Ibi Ecclesia; As Peter, so the Church
- Established: 1974; 52 years ago (founded as an amalgamation of Marist Brother's High School, St Joseph's High School and St Patrick's Intermediate School)
- Ministry of Education Institution no.: 204
- Principal: Margaret Leamy
- Enrolment: 787 (July 2026)
- Colour: █ Green
- Socio-economic decile: 6N
- Website: stpeterspn.school.nz

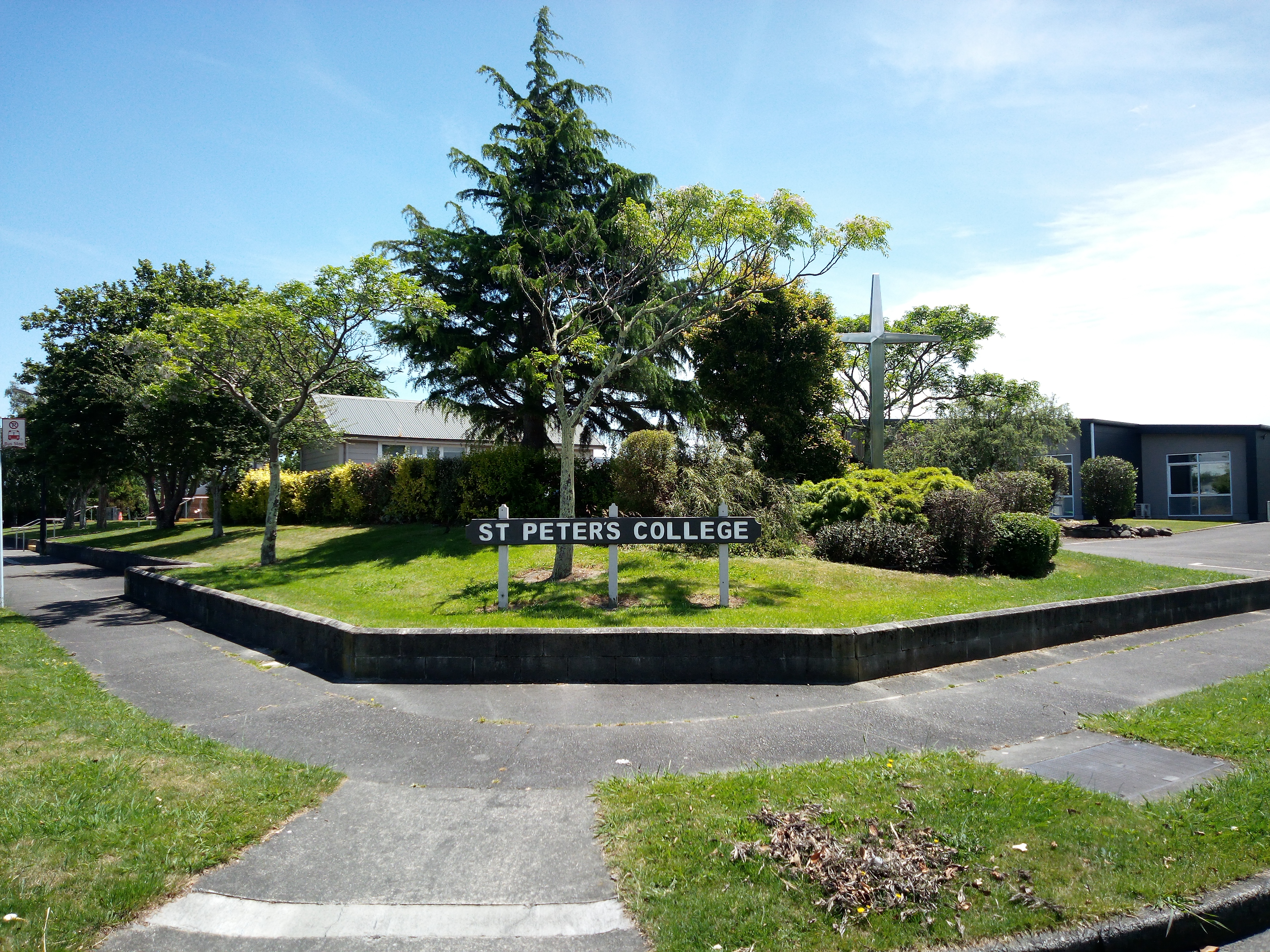
St Peter's College in 2025

St Peter's College is a state-integrated Catholic co-ed composite College in Palmerston North, New Zealand. It serves approximately 731 students from Year 7 to Year 13. The school's campus includes the historic St Anskar's Chapel, which was given to the school by the Dannevirke Catholic community.

== History ==
The college brought together two secondary schools and an intermediate school:

- Marist Brothers High School for boys located in Grey Street at the rear of the Cathedral of the Holy Spirit;
- St Joseph’s High School for girls, Fitchett St (staffed by the Sisters of Mercy); and
- St Patrick’s Intermediate School, Pirie St.

The college was built on former farmland in Milson gifted by a Catholic family.

The college commenced operations in late 1974 and was officially opened on 18 August 1974 by the 29th Prime Minister of New Zealand, Norman Kirk, shortly before his death in office on 31 August. The opening of St Peter's College was Norman Kirk's last public appearance.

== Enrolment ==
As a state-integrated school, the proprietors of St Peter's College charge compulsory attendance dues to cover capital costs. For the 2025 school year, the attendance dues payable are $544 per year for students in years 7 and 8, and $1,088 per year for secondary students in years 9 and above.

As of July 2026, St Peter's College has a roll of 787 students, of which 116 (14.7%) identify as Māori.

As of 2026, the school has an Equity Index of 436, placing it amongst schools whose students have below average socioeconomic barriers to achievement (roughly equivalent to deciles 6 and 7 under the former socio-economic decile system).

== Organisation ==
The school is divided into a junior school (years 7–10) and a senior school (years 11–13) with each group having a head boy and head girl with the latter being school-representative.

== Houses ==
Students and teachers alike are divided into four houses, named after the first four bishops or archbishops of Wellington. The houses compete annually for the House Shield, involving many house led competitions, like Parables (a short drama based on a Biblical parable), House Kapa Haka, House Singing and so on, as well as serving an organisational purpose for the students:

- Redwood (Red) – Named for Francis Redwood.
- Viard (Green) – Named for Philippe Viard.
- O'Shea (Blue) – Named for Thomas O'Shea.
- McKeefry (Yellow) – Named for Cardinal McKeefry.

== Principals ==
The following persons have occupied the position of principal of the college

- Sister Mary Clement (Girls)(1974-1979),
- Brother Henry Spinks (Boys) (1974 – 1981)
- Sister Mary de Porres (Girls) (1980-1981)
- Trevor Boyle (first lay principal) (1982 – 1991)
- Ron O'Leary (1992–2001)
- Christopher England (2001 - 2007)
- David Olivier (2010 – 2018)
- Kevin Shore (2018 – 2020)
- Margaret Leamy (2020 – present)

== Sporting Rivalries ==
St Peter's Rugby Union 1st XV plays traditional matches against four other Catholic Schools. The schools are: St John's College, Hastings; Francis Douglas Memorial College, New Plymouth; Cullinane College, Wanganui (formerly St Augustines); and Chanel College, Masterton. Traditional games are played on an annual basis, with home and away legs alternating.

== Alumni ==
The following persons were educated at St. Peter's College, Marist Brother's High School, St. Joseph's High School and St. Patrick's Intermediate, Palmerston North, New Zealand.

- Vaine Greig (born 1991) – New Zealand representative rugby union player.
- Mike McRedmond (born 1958) – cycling coach and former racing cyclist olympian.
- Brian Molloy (botanist) ONZM (1930–2022) – plant ecologist, conservationist, and rugby union player representing New Zealand (Marist Brothers).
- Simon Power – CEO of TVNZ; former banker, politician, Member of Parliament and cabinet minister.
- Mary Quin (born 1953) - business chief executive; Former CEO of Callaghan Innovation and hostage survivor.
- Layla Sae (born 2000) – rugby union player.
- Albert Victor Sing (1892 – 1950) – soldier (Marist Brothers).
- Herbert Stanley Sing (1892 – 1916) World War I soldier killed in action 3 July 1916 at the Battle of the Somme (Marist Brothers).
- Arthur Singe (1898–1936) – rugby league player representing New Zealand in 1925 (Marist Brothers).
- Tim Wilkinson – professional golfer on the PGA Tour

== Sources ==
- Pat Gallager, The Marist Brothers in New Zealand Fiji & Samoa 1876–1976, New Zealand Marist Brothers' Trust Board, Tuakau, 1976.
