= St Bernard's College, Lower Hutt =

Catholic secondary school for boys in Wellington, New Zealand

St Bernard's College
- Te Kura Tuarua Ō Hato Perenara

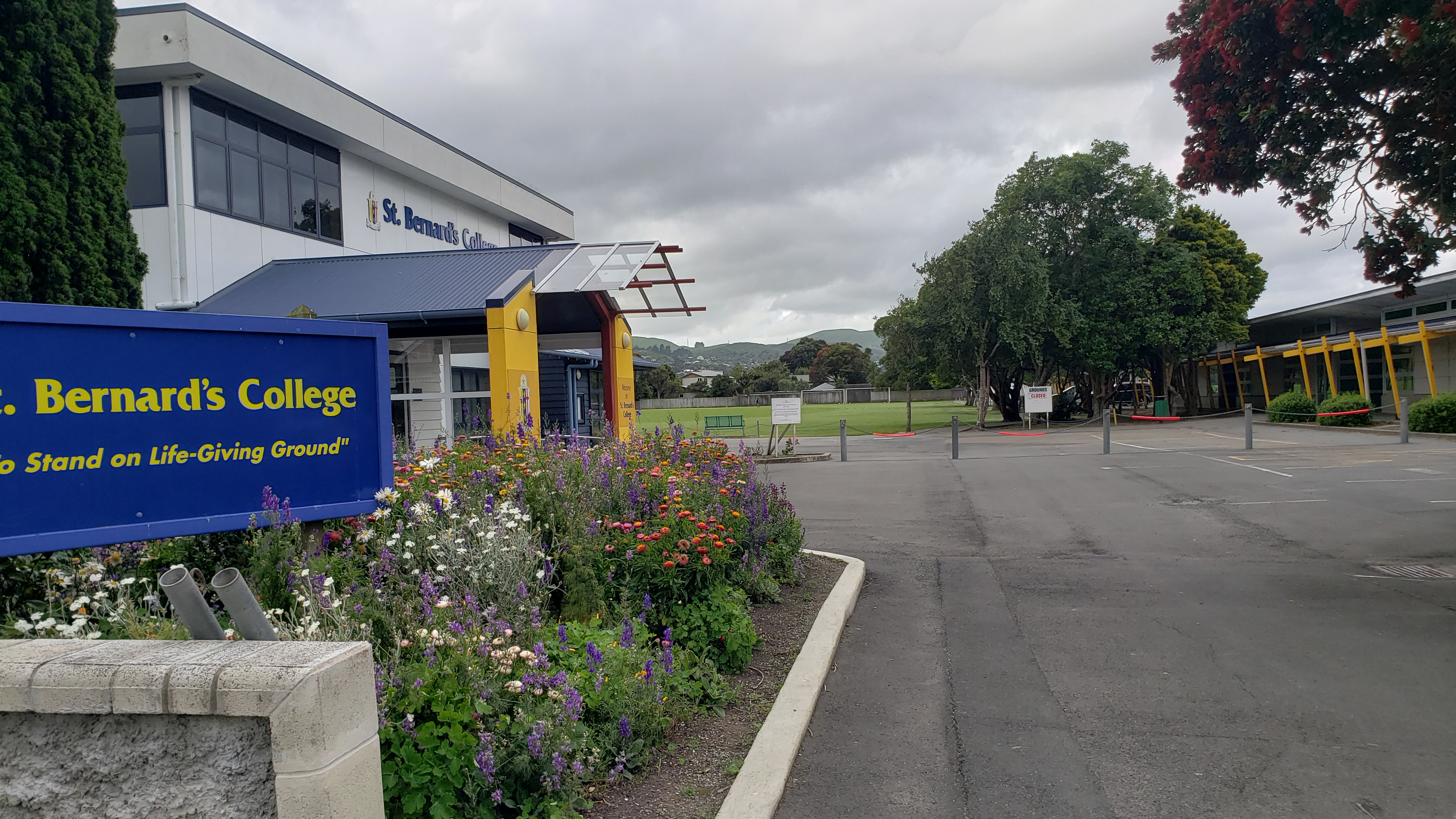
- St Bernard’s College from Waterloo Road

Location
- 183 Waterloo Road, Lower Hutt, New Zealand; 41.2104°S 174.9169°E

Information
- Type: State integrated boys Secondary (Year 7–13)
- Motto: Respice Stellam Voca Mariam "Look To The Star, Call Upon Mary"
- Established: 1946; 80 years ago
- Sister school: Sacred Heart College, Lower Hutt
- Ministry of Education Institution no.: 260
- Principal: Simon Stack
- Enrolment: 677 (July 2026)
- Colors: Blue and gold
- Nickname: The 183
- Socio-economic decile: 6N
- Website: www.sbc.school.nz

St Bernard's College (SBC or SBC183) is a Catholic year 7 to 13 (form 1 to 7) secondary school for boys located at 183 Waterloo Rd, Lower Hutt, Wellington, New Zealand. The school was opened by the Marist Brothers in 1946. Years 7 and 8 were previously part of St Bernard's Intermediate.

The maximum roll is 680 pupils.

== Notable alumni ==
- Inoke Afeaki – Rugby union
- Stanley Afeaki – Rugby union
- Craig Bradshaw – basketball
- John Callen – actor
- Lee Donoghue – actor
- John Dougan – All Black
- Viliami Fine – Rugby union
- Mladen Ivančić – Chief Operating Officer, NZ Film Commission
- Marvin Karawana – rugby league & rugby union
- Sione Katoa – rugby league
- Genesis Mamea Lemalu – rugby union
- Jacob Laban - Rugby league
- Issac Luke – rugby league
- Ben Matulino – rugby league
- Roderick Mulgan – physician and barrister
- Kaelin Nguyen (born 2003) - professional footballer
- Alan Schirnack – rugby league
- Jason Schirnack – rugby league
- Sam Tagataese – rugby league
- Matt Visser – physicist and mathematician
- Brian Wickens (born 1947) – professional wrestler ("Bushwacker Luke")

== See also ==
- List of schools in New Zealand
- List of Marist Brothers schools

== Sources ==
- Pat Gallagher, The Marist Brothers in New Zealand Fiji & Samoa 1876–1976, New Zealand Marist Brothers' Trust Board, Tuakau, 1976.
