= Albert Victor Sing =

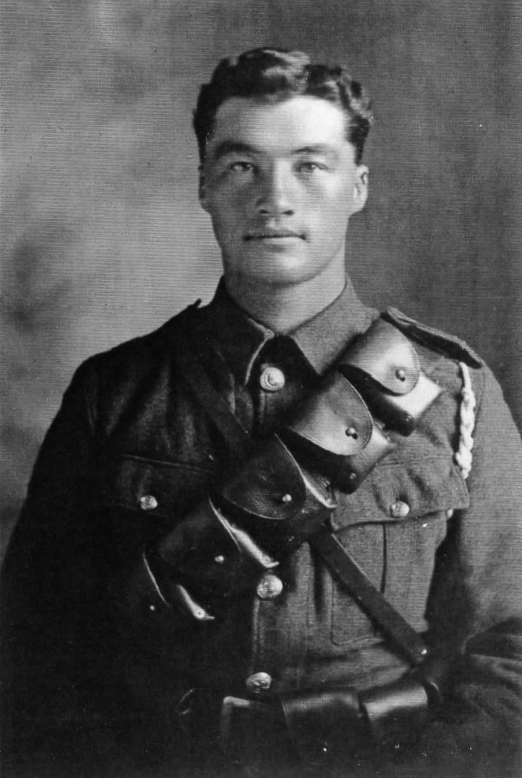
- Sing in 1915
- Born: 9 May 1892; Whanganui, New Zealand
- Died: 22 August 1950 (aged 58); Gisborne, New Zealand
- Military career
- Allegiance: New Zealand
- Service years: 1915-1917
- Service number: WW1 13/3077

Albert Victor Sing (9 May 1892 – 22 August 1950) also known as Private Albert Victor (Vincent) Singe was a New Zealand World War 1 veteran of Irish and Chinese descent.

Sing was born in Whanganui, Manawatu-Wanganui on 9 May 1892 to mother Mrs Francis Sing (Nee Smith) of Irish descent and William Ping Sing, who was born in China and later immigrated to New Zealand.

Albert Victor Sing was one of four brothers, Herbert Stanley Sing, Robert Francis Sing and Arthur Percy Sing who served New Zealand in WW1.

== Life and First World War ==
Albert Victor Sing, along with his brothers attended Marist Brothers High School in Palmerston North.

Albert enlisted alongside his brother Arthur Percy Sing in February 1916. Albert and Arthur served with A Squadron, Auckland Mounted Rifles. When Albert Victor Sing and his brother enlisted they lived in Browning Street in the Auckland suburb of Grey Lynn with their mother. Sing served a total of 355 days service and was discharged on 6 November 1917.

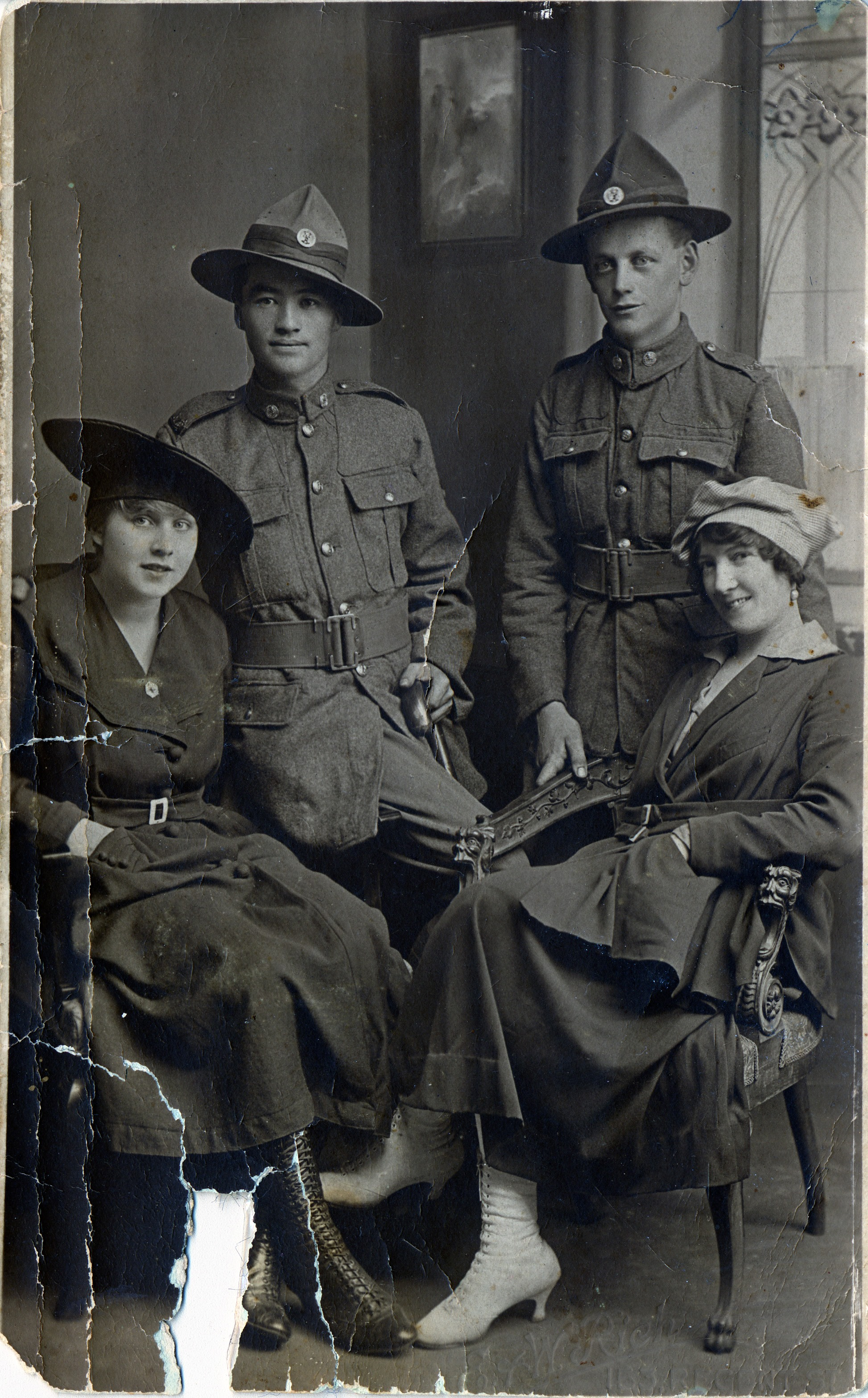
Group portrait including Victor Albert Sing (Singe) and Isobel Singe (left hand couple)

Sing was sent to Egypt in 1916 to join the Egyptian Expeditionary Force. Albert and his brother Arthur left New Zealand on 29 February 1916 on the ship 'Aparima', arriving in Suez on 4 April 1916. From 1916-17 he fought in the Western Front.

Some confusion surrounding the spelling of the surname 'Sing' is addressed on 7 April 1922, Sing received a letter from the War Accounts and Records Office that Albert had requested to alter his name from 'Sing' to 'Singe' despite his name in his service records being 'Sing'. The letter also noted that on 14 March 1917 Albert signed a document in France that confirmed his recently deceased brothers name as Herbert Stanley Sing. Despite Albert's elder brother Herbert using the name Albert when he enlisted to the New Zealand Army. In later Newspaper documents unrelated to his military records, Albert's name is written as 'Singe'.

In 1934, Sing took Edward Martin to court for his involvement in a motor incident, which saw Sing hit by Martin's car while cycling. Sing stated that on the night of 14 October, while cycling home on Gladstone Road toward Roebuck Road in Gisborne, a car accelerated behind him. The vehicle hit Sing, which witnesses say threw him into the air and then the cars wheel passed over his body. Witnesses pulled Sing from under the vehicle and he was taken to hospital. The driver admitted negligence and was found to be driving while intoxicated. Sing claimed damages in court and was awarded £570 by the jury for special damages and costs.

Sing appears across various New Zealand newspapers including The New Zealand Herald, in 1938 and again in 1946 reporting charges for bookmaking.

Sing had three children with wife Isobel, Donald, Mervyn and Miles. Sing died in Gisborne in 1950 at age 58 and is buried in the Taruheru Cemetery in Gisborne.

Albert Victor Sing is one of 71 New Zealand service people identified as being of Chinese descent.
