= Owen Dolan =

New Zealand bishop (1928–2025)

The Most Reverend Owen Dolan
- Coadjutor Bishop Emeritus of Palmerston North
- Archdiocese: Wellington
- Diocese: Palmerston North
- Installed: 10 December 1995
- Term ended: 30 September 2004

Orders
- Ordination: 21 July 1954 (Priest) by Archbishop Peter McKeefry
- Consecration: 10 December 1995 (Coadjutor Bishop) by Bishop Peter Cullinane

Personal details
- Born: Owen John Dolan; 30 September 1928 Hāwera, New Zealand
- Died: 28 April 2025 (aged 96) Palmerston North, New Zealand
- Denomination: Roman Catholic Church

Owen John Dolan (30 September 1928 – 28 April 2025) was the Coadjutor Bishop Emeritus of Palmerston North. He was appointed coadjutor bishop by Pope John Paul II on 2 November 1995 and was consecrated on 10 December 1995. He retired on 30 September 2004. He died in Palmerston North on 28 April 2025, at the age of 96.

Catholic Church titles
Preceded by —	Coadjutor Bishop of Palmerston North; 1995–2004	Succeeded by —
