= Jamie Curry =

New Zealand YouTube personality, vlogger, and comedian

- Born: 26 July 1996 (age 30); Napier, New Zealand
- Occupation: YouTuber
- Years active: 2012–2019
- Known for: Jamie's World
- Partner: Laura Nye (2017–2022)

YouTube information
- Channel: Jamie's World
- Genres: Comedy; entertainment; vlogs
- Subscribers: 1.19 million
- Views: 65.5 million
- Last updated: 3 August 2025

Jamie Curry (born 26 July 1996) is a New Zealand YouTube personality, vlogger, and comedian, best known for creating Jamie's World.

== Early life ==
Curry grew up in Taradale and attended Sacred Heart College, which she graduated from in 2014.

== Career ==
She began creating Jamie's World videos in 2012; her first video was a parody music video, to "Weird Al" Yankovic's song "White & Nerdy". By 2013, she was reaching an audience of 7 million people per week.

She co-authored a book with Alex Casey, They Let Me Write A Book!: Jamie’s World, which was published in 2015. She was nominated for Favorite Aussie/Kiwi Internet Sensation in the 2015 Kids' Choice Awards.

In 2016, she played Becky in New Zealand comedy television programme Funny Girls.

In 2017, she published a series of videos called Jamie's World on Ice, which were filmed during a trip to Antarctica in November 2016. Produced and directed by Damian Christie, it consists of four episodes and two special features, all but one of which were published on her YouTube channel. The four episodes and the remaining special feature were published on TVNZ OnDemand on 12 May 2017. She appeared on a celebrity "All-Star" episode of Family Feud on 26 April 2017.

== Personal life ==
In 2015, she moved from her family home in Napier to Auckland.

On 24 June 2018, she published a video announcing that she was engaged to a woman.
