= Vaine Greig =

New Zealand rugby union player

- Born: 11 December 1991 (age 34)
- School: St Peter's College

Rugby union career
Amateur team(s)
Years	Team	Apps	(Points)
- Feilding Old Boys-Oroua
Provincial / State sides
Years	Team	Apps	(Points)
2013–2020	Manawatu	14	(25)
National sevens team
Years	Team		Comps
2013	New Zealand		

Vaine Greig (born 11 December 1991) is a New Zealand rugby union player. She represented New Zealand at the 2013 Rugby World Cup Sevens in Russia.

Greig attended St Peter's College. She was named in the Black Ferns sevens team for the 2013 Amsterdam Sevens.
