= Herbert Stanley Sing =

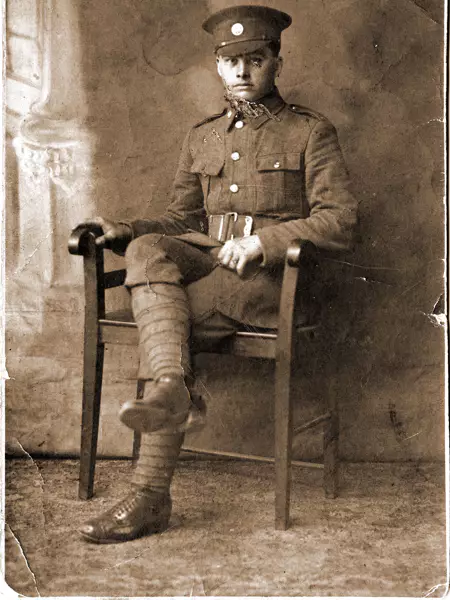
- Born: 9 May 1892; Palmerston North, New Zealand
- Died: 3 July 1916 (aged 24); Somme, Northern France
- Burial place: Cite Bonjean Military Cemetery, Armentieres, France
- Military career
- Allegiance: New Zealand
- Branch: Army
- Service years: 1914-1916
- Nickname: Bert
- Service number: WW1 12/1097

Herbert Stanley Sing (9 May 1892 – 3 July 1916) also known as Private Herbert Singe was a New Zealand World War I soldier of Irish and Chinese descent.

Sing was born in Palmerston North on 9 May 1892 to mother Mrs Frances Margaret Sing (Nee Smith) (3 March 1868 - 7 June 1923) of Irish descent and William Ping Sing (1849 -14 October 1929), who was born in China and later immigrated to New Zealand.

Herbert was one of four brothers, Albert Victor Sing, Robert Francis Sing and Arthur Percy Sing, who all served New Zealand in WW1.

== Life and First World War ==
Herbert Sing, along with his three brothers attended Marist Brothers High School in Palmerston North. Prior to enlisting, he was a well-known swimmer and completed the cross-harbour swim from Northcote to Shelly Beach.

Sing was described to have come from a 'fighting family' with his great- grandfather Stephen Neary of the 57th Regiment, who fought in the Battle of Waterloo. And his maternal grandfather who fought in the Crimean War and Indian Mutiny. It is also noted that other relatives took part in the New Zealand Wars.

Sing enlisted in the New Zealand Army on 4 September 1914 at age 22. On 16 October 1914 Sing left from Wellington, New Zealand on HMNZT 8 (Star of India) or 12 (Waimana) and arrived to Suez, Egypt on 3 December 1914. He also served throughout the Gallipoli campaign.

Sing enlisted in the New Zealand Expeditionary Force under the assumed name 'Albert Sing'. His records were amended after his death to read 'Herbert Stanley Sing'.

He served as a Signaler during his time in the Army. Sing was also a cook by trade before enlisting. He was appointed corp cook on 3 March 1916. Sing's military records show he was wounded on the 5 May 1915 during the Gallipoli campaign.

Herbert Stanley Sing is one of 71 New Zealand WW1 service people identified as being of Chinese descent.

== Death ==
Sing was killed in action on the 3 July 1916 at the Battle of the Somme, Northern France. His death occurred during what was described as, the worst bombardment experienced in the line since New Zealand troops arrived.

Sing's brother Private Albert Sing wrote of his death:

He was killed in the trenches at Armentieres on the night of July 3rd. A big bombardment started on our right, and came right down the line to us. It started at about 10 p.m.. and never stopped until 2 a.m. next morning. Arthur and I were in the trenches at that time, but we were further down the line where we only got the tail end of the 'strafe.' Herbert was attached to Headquarters in the 1st Auckland Brigade, whilst we were attached to the 2nd; we did not try join up with him for it was not much good as we could always see him when we desired, for the two brigades generally went into the trenches together. We used to see each other on lots of occasions. The last time I saw him was two days before the fatal strafe. It was only a few weeks previous to this that Herbert made a name for himself in a strafe. He was on duty at the telephone when the wire was broken on three different occasions. Each time he went out and repaired it. He was sitting in the dug-out when a big trench mortar shell burst near him, the concussion knocking him and the telephone over. After he gathered himself up he caught up the phone and carried it outside and planted it in a small open trench, fitted it up and communicated. He was seen to do this, and it is reported that was recommended for the D.C.M.

— Auckland Star, Volume XLVII, Issue 225, 25 October 1916, Page 7

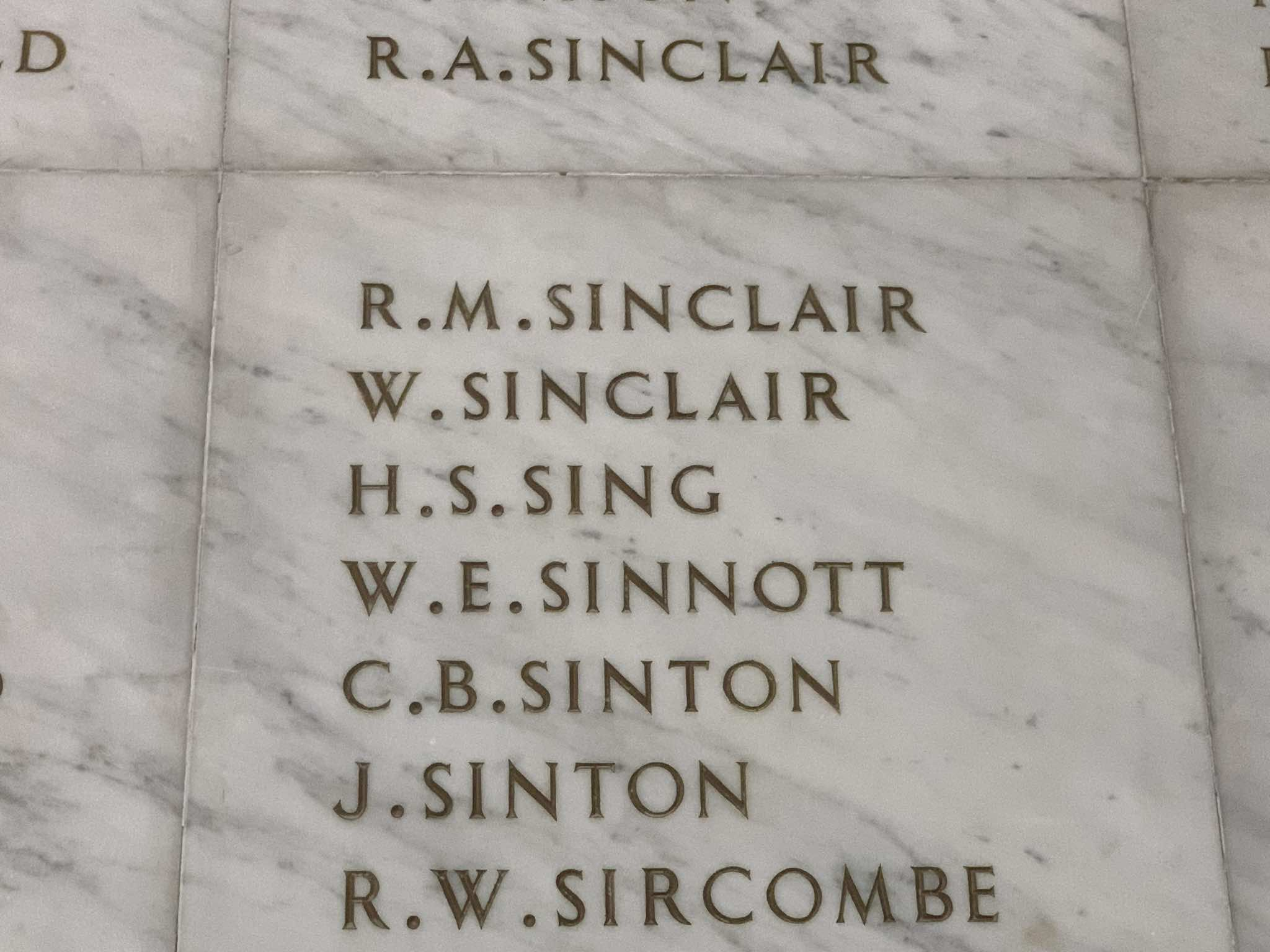
Here shows H.S.Sing's name displayed on the Auckland Roll of Honour at Auckland War Memorial Museum's World War One Hall of Memories.

Private Enwright, Sing's battalion mate wrote to Sing's mother accounting the circumstances of his death:

"Herbert met his death under the following circumstances. He was in the dugout, with three others, during the bombardment, and the shells began to land near by. He told the others to go out to another dugout but they would not leave him. Shortly afterwards a shell struck the dugout, and four brave men and four good soldiers left us. It was very unfortunate that a man should have gone right through the Gallipoli campaign unscathed and should come here and meet his end at the hands of the ghoulish Huns, who will before long be repaid in their own coin. The New Zealanders have made firm resolve to exact repariation for the damage done by the Germans. Already the New Zealand and Australian Army Corps have shown the Huns what they are made of, and before long we hope to have several victories which will leave absolutely no doubt as to the final issue of this terrible affair".

— Auckland Star, Volume XLVII, Issue 255, 25 October 1916, Page 7

Sing was noted to be extremely popular among his peers due to his 'soldierly qualities'. After his death he won a Distinguished Conduct Medal for exceptional bravery. Sing was buried alongside a friend who perished in the same attack. He was buried in the Cite Bonjean Military Cemetery in Armentières, France, with a burial service conducted by Catholic Chaplain-Captain Richards.
