= Sacred Heart College, Lower Hutt =

Sacred Heart College

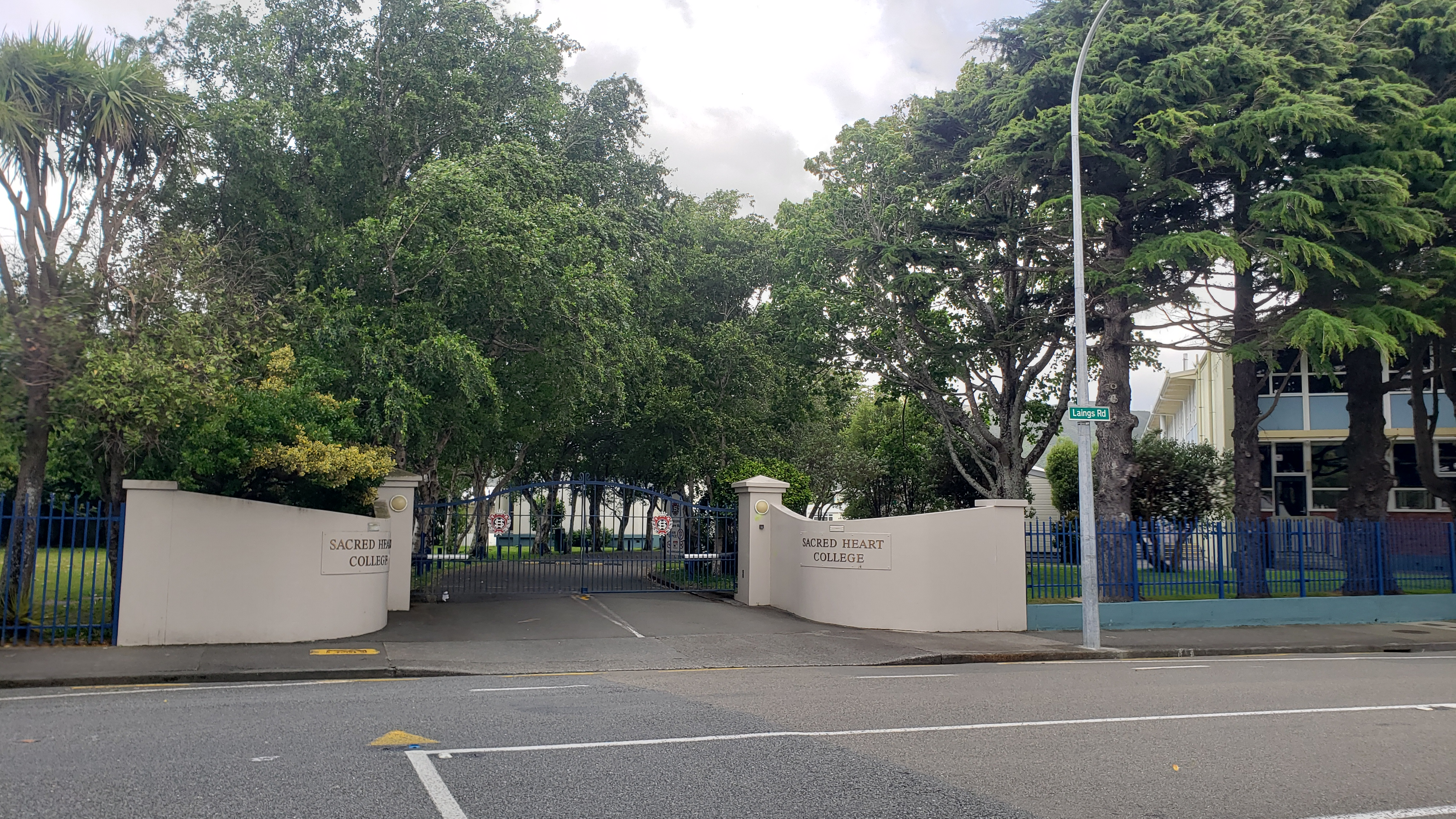

Location
- 65 Laings Road, Lower Hutt, New Zealand; 41.2148°S 174.9067°E

Information
- Type: State integrated Girls' Secondary, Years 9–13
- Established: 1912; 114 years ago
- Sister school: St Bernard's College, Lower Hutt
- Ministry of Education Institution no.: 262
- Principal: Katrina Kerr-Bell
- Enrolment: 829 (July 2026)
- Socio-economic decile: 7O
- Website: sacredheartcollege.school.nz

Sacred Heart College is a state-integrated single-sex girls' Catholic secondary school in Lower Hutt, New Zealand.

It was established in 1912 by the Sisters of Our Lady of the Missions and was the first secondary school to be opened in the Hutt Valley. It was originally sited in high street on the property known as Margaret street. In 1957 the school was shifted to the existing site on Laings Road. In May 1980 it became the first Catholic secondary school to be integrated under the Private Schools Conditional Integration Act 1975. The school has six house groups: Lisieux (Pink), Avila (Red), Aubert (Green), Lourdes (Light Blue), Barbier (Dark Blue) and Siena (Yellow).

Due to having earthquake prone buildings the school strengthened its largest building in early 2017 and demolished its tallest in December 2017.

== Enrolment ==
As a state-integrated school, the proprietors of Sacred Heart College charge compulsory attendance dues to cover capital costs. For the 2025 school year, the attendance dues payable is $1,147 per year per student.

As of July 2026, Sacred Heart College has a roll of 829 students, of which 190 (22.9%) identify as Māori.

As of 2026, the school has an Equity Index of 444, placing it amongst schools whose students have below average socioeconomic barriers to achievement (roughly equivalent to deciles 6 and 7 under the former socio-economic decile system).

== Notable alumnae ==
- Teresa Bergman, dux 2004, singer-songwriter-guitarist
- Geraldine Brophy (born 1961) television, film and stage actress, theatre director and playwright
- Stephanie Dowrick, writer and spiritual teacher
- Catherine Chidgey, novelist
- Xingxing Wang, operatic soprano
