= Peter Cullinane =

21st-century Catholic bishop

The Most Reverend Peter Cullinane CNZM
- Emeritus Bishop of the Roman Catholic Diocese of Palmerston North
- Province: Wellington
- Diocese: Palmerston North
- Installed: 23 April 1980
- Term ended: 22 February 2012
- Predecessor: Diocese established
- Successor: Charles Drennan

Orders
- Ordination: 23 December 1961 (Priest) in Genoa
- Consecration: 23 April 1980 (Bishop)

Personal details
- Born: Peter James Cullinane; 29 November 1936 (age 89) Dannevirke, New Zealand
- Denomination: Roman Catholic Church
- Residence: Palmerston North
- Occupation: Emeritus Roman Catholic bishop
- Profession: Cleric

Peter James Cullinane CNZM (born 29 November 1936), is a New Zealand bishop who served as the first Catholic bishop of Palmerston North. He was appointed as Bishop of Palmerston North by Pope John Paul II on 6 March 1980 and was consecrated on 23 April 1980. He established the Cathedral of the Holy Spirit (built in 1925, rededicated in 1980, renovated and added to in 1988) as his seat of operations. He retired on 22 February 2012. Cullinane College was named after him.

In 1990, Cullinane was awarded the New Zealand 1990 Commemoration Medal. In the 2006 New Year Honours, he was appointed a Companion of the New Zealand Order of Merit, for services to the community.

Catholic Church titles
New title	1st Bishop of Palmerston North; 1980–2012	Succeeded by Charles Drennan
