= Cullinane College =

Secondary school in Whanganui, New Zealand

Location
- 15 Peat Street, Aramoho, Whanganui, New Zealand; 39.9138°S 175.0459°E

Information
- Type: Integrated secondary (year 9–13) Co-Ed
- Motto: For Love of God, Life and Learning.
- Established: 2003; 23 years ago
- Ministry of Education Institution no.: 190
- Principal: Tony McBride
- Enrolment: 495 (July 2026)
- Socio-economic decile: 4J
- Website: cullinanecollege.school.nz

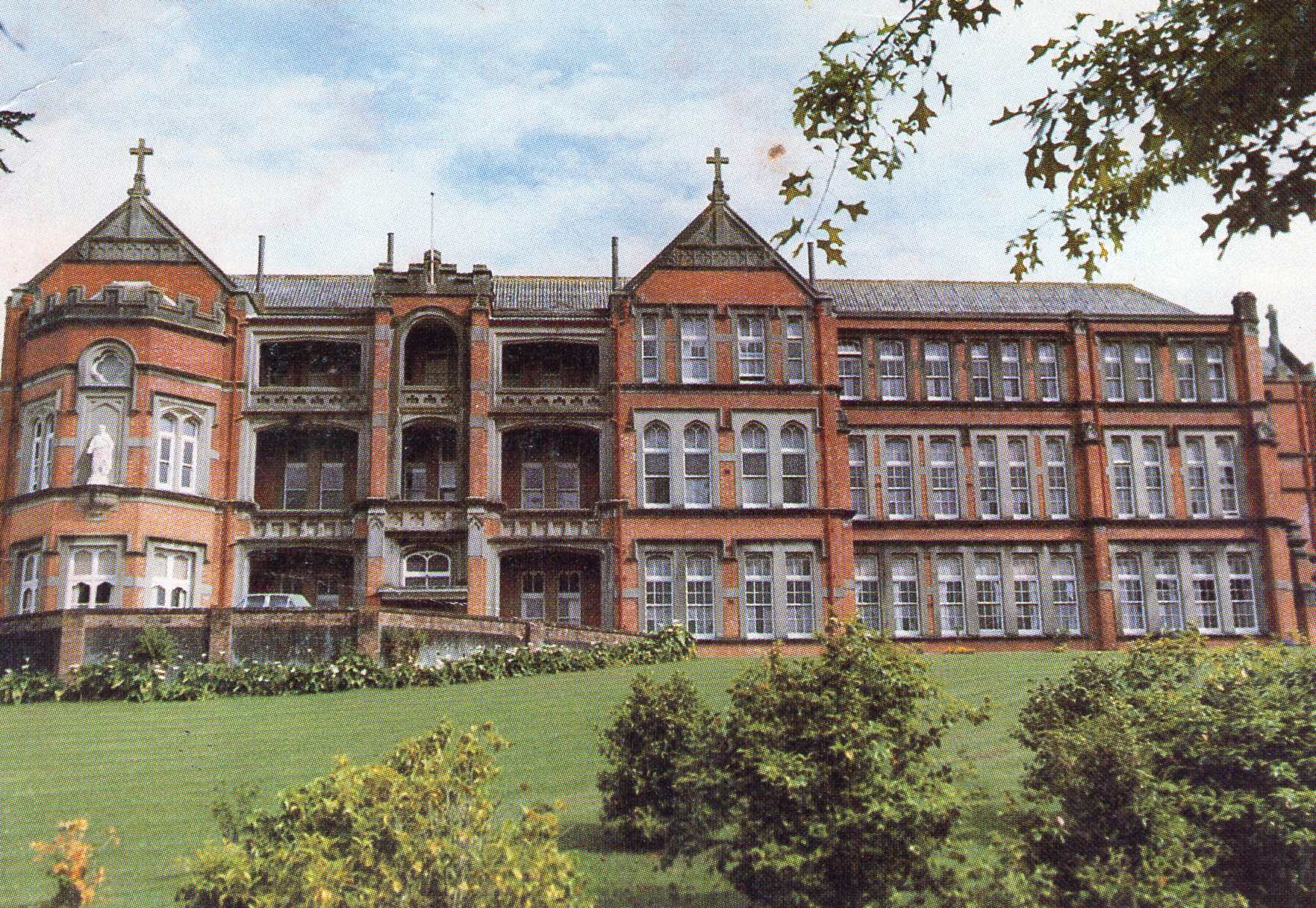
Wanganui Sacred Heart College in the 1970s

Cullinane College is an integrated, Co-Educational Secondary school in Whanganui, New Zealand for students in Year 9 to Year 13. Cullinane College was founded in 2003, through the combining of Sacred Heart College (founded in 1880 and operated by the Sisters of St Joseph of Nazareth) and St Augustines College (founded in 1944 and operated by the priests and brothers of the Society of Mary).

== Name ==
The college is named after: Sister Vincent Cullinane RSJ and Sister Cuthbert Cullinane RSJ (both important teachers at Sacred Heart College); Father John Cullinane SM (an important teacher at St Augustine's College); and Bishop Peter James Cullinane, first Bishop of Palmerston North (1980–2012). The Bishop of Palmerston North is the proprietor of the college.

== Enrolment ==
As a state-integrated school, the proprietors of Cullinane College charge compulsory attendance dues to cover capital costs. For the 2025 school year, the attendance dues payable are $544 per year for students in years 7 and 8, and $1,088 per year for secondary students in years 9 and above.

As of July 2026, Cullinane College has a roll of 495 students, of which 184 (37.2%) identify as Māori.

As of 2026, the school has an Equity Index of 497, placing it amongst schools whose students have many socioeconomic barriers to achievement (roughly equivalent to deciles 2 and 3 under the former socio-economic decile system).

== Sports exchange ==
The college has an annual junior (Year 9, 10 and occasionally Year 11) sports exchange with Awatapu College in Palmerston North, generally competing in netball, basketball and rugby union. The exchange has been running as long as Cullinane's existence.

== Principals ==
- Justin Harper ( – July 2022)
- Lida Penn-Reina (Acting) (July 2022)
- Tony McBride (2023 – present)

== Notable alumni ==
People educated at Cullinane College or either of its antecedents.

- Brett Cameron (born 1996) professional rugby union player; All Black
- Johnny Devlin (born 1938) musician and performer (St Augustine's College)
- Martin Devlin (born 1964) radio and television broadcaster (St Augustine's College)
- Peter McKenzie (born 1943) actor (St Augustine's College)
- Ray O'Leary (born 1993) comedian and actor
- Glen Osborne (born 1971) All Black, television presenter, police officer(St Augustine's College)
- Simon Owen (born 1971) golfer(St Augustine's College)
- Harete Hipango (born 1965) politician, National Party member of parliament 2017-2020 (Sacred Heart College)
- Christian Rivers (born 1974) film director(St Augustine's College)
- Jane Winstone (1912 – 1944) aviator. (Sacred Heart College)
