= St Joseph's Māori Girls' College =

Location
- 25 Osier Rd; Taradale, Napier, New Zealand; 39.5274°S 176.8556°E

Information
- Type: Integrated single-sex girls secondary (year 7–13)
- Motto: Io mahi katoa mahia – whatever you do, do to the best of your ability
- Established: 1867; 159 years ago
- Ministry of Education Institution no.: 222
- Enrolment: 180 (July 2026)
- Socio-economic decile: 2F
- Website: www.sjmgc.school.nz

St Joseph's Māori Girls' College or Hato Hōhepa is a Catholic, integrated, boarding and day college in Taradale, New Zealand, for girls in Year 7 to Year 13. It is the largest Māori girls' boarding secondary school in New Zealand.

== History ==
St Joseph's Māori Girls' College was founded in 1867 by the Sisters of Our Lady of the Missions. The college commenced on the property which is now Sacred Heart College, Napier when the Sisters and the Māori Missioner, Fr Reigner SM, started a little boarding school for Māori girls at first called St Joseph's Providence, which opened on 10 October 1867 with twenty pupils. The first principal was Sister Mary St John. The college usually had an enrolment of up to 60 pupils each year into the twentieth century. After the Napier earthquake of 1931 St Joseph's was rebuilt on its present site at Greenmeadows and reopened in 1935. The Sisters remained the school's proprietors. In 1982 the proprietors signed an integration Agreement with the Minister of Education and the college entered the State education system.

== Compilations ==
- He Koha Waiata – A Gift Of Song (South Pacific Recordings) (1996)

== Notable alumnae ==
- Whina Cooper ONZ DBE
- Moana Maniapoto MNZM: New Zealand singer, songwriter and documentarymaker
- Hinewehi Mohi: New Zealand singer/songwriter and television producer
- Katerina Mataira DNZM: Academic, artist, author, linguist and Maori-language programme developer
- Whirimako Black MNZM: New Zealand singer
- Georgina Kingi DNZM: Current principal of the college

== References/Sources ==
- Maria van der Linden, St Joseph’s Maori Girls’ College, 1867-1990 : nga korero mo te Kura Maori o Hato Hohepa, Dunmore Press, Palmerston North, 1990.
- Michael King, God's Farthest Outpost: A History of Catholics in New Zealand (research by Merle van de Klundert) (1997), ISBN 0-670-87652-6.
