= Mladen Ivančić (film promoter) =

New Zealand film administrator

- Born: 1955 (age 70–71); Petone, New Zealand
- Occupations: Former CFO, COO and acting CEO of the New Zealand Film Commission
- Years active: 1989–2023

Mladen Ivančić (born in 1955) is a New Zealand film official. He worked for the New Zealand Film Commission promoting and funding films for over 30 years, retiring in 2023.

== Early life ==
Ivančić was born in Petone of Croatian parents, Stojan (born in Bosnia and Herzegovina) and Sylvija, who had met in New Zealand. He was educated at St Bernard's College, Lower Hutt and Victoria University of Wellington where he graduated with a Bachelor of Commerce and Administration.

== Career ==
Ivančić was appointed as Finance Director of the Film Commission in 1989 and held the roles of Deputy Chief Executive, Chief Financial Officer, Acting CEO (on six occasions) and Chief Operating Officer until 2023.

Ivančić and his team negotiated over 12 co-production treaties including with China, Germany, India, The Republic of Korea, Singapore, Spain, South Africa and the UK. He received the SPADA / Onfilm Industry Champion Award in 2006, an acknowledgment of his significant contributions to the screen industry in New Zealand. The films he provided funding for included Once Were Warriors, An Angel at My Table, The World's Fastest Indian, Whale Rider, Hunt for the Wilderpeople, Heavenly Creatures, Whina and Red, White and Brass. In his role, Ivančić spoke publicly about the importance of government funding to New Zealand's film production industry.

Ivančić represented the Film Commission in the team which designed criteria and processes for a New Zealand Government grant of NZ$50m for production funding to the Film Commission to support the sector following COVID-19 disruptions. He was credited by the Film Commission with ensuring that the funding was allocated appropriately, leading to $154m in film and television investment.
