= Sacred Heart College, Napier =

Sacred Heart College

Location
- Convent Road; Bluff Hill; Napier 4110; New Zealand; 39.4827°S 176.9115°E

Information
- Funding type: State integrated
- Motto: Hearts and Minds in Harmony
- Religious affiliation: Catholic
- Established: 1867; 159 years ago
- Ministry of Education Institution no.: 219
- Principal: Mrs Maria Neville-Foster
- Years offered: 9–13
- Gender: Girls
- Enrolment: 354 (July 2026)
- Socio-economic decile: 5M
- Website: www.sacredheartnapier.school.nz

Sacred Heart College, Napier (Te Kareti o Ngakau Tapu) is a state-integrated Catholic girls' secondary school located in Napier, New Zealand.

It was founded on its present site in 1867 by the Sisters of Our Lady of the Missions. For the first one hundred years of its existence, the College was staffed predominantly by the Sisters of the Missions. Sister Mary Rose who completed her term in 1998 was the last Mission Sister to hold the position of Principal. The original buildings withstood the 1931 Napier earthquake. Sacred Heart was a private school until 1982, when it along with all other Catholic schools in New Zealand integrated into the state education system.

During the 1990s new buildings were erected and existing ones upgraded. The new Barbier and Marian blocks were blessed and opened, and Ross and Dennehy blocks were updated and rededicated. On 30 June 2001 the convent building, the chapel and a section of the hostel were destroyed by fire. These have now been, or are in the process of being, replaced. The latest addition is the full-sized gymnasium named after Sister Mary Rose Holderness.

The boarding hostel attached to the college, which had accommodation for some seventy five girls, was closed in April 2010 Both the College and the hostel are administered on behalf of the Sisters by the Mission College Napier Trust Board and the Hostel Management Committee. The Board of Trustees administers government funds and governs the school.

== Enrolment ==
As a state-integrated Catholic school in the Palmerston North diocese, Sacred Heart has a preferential enrolment scheme. In general, preferential enrolment is given to students who are baptised Catholic, or who has a baptised Catholic parent or sibling; a signed letter from the priest of the student's or their parent's parish is required to confirm preferential enrolment. The school is permitted to enrol a limited number of non-preferential (i.e. non-Catholic) students, but these students must not exceed 5% of the school's roll.

While effectively a state-run school, the school land and buildings at Sacred Heart and other state-integrated schools are still privately owned and are not funded by the Government. Land and buildings are instead funded through compulsory "attendance dues" paid by the students' parents. The amount payable is set by the diocese, and as of 2014 is set at $818 per year.

At the October 2012 Education Review Office (ERO) report, Sacred Heart College had a roll of 275 students, including two international students. 65% of students identified as being European New Zealanders (Pākehā), 22% identified as Māori, 9% as Pasifika, and 4% as another ethnicity.

The school has a socio-economic decile of 5, which means the school draws similar numbers of poorer and well-off students, if slightly to the poorer side.

== Notable alumni ==
- Jamie Curry – vlogger and comedian known for creating Jamie's World

== Sources ==
- And God gave the increase: Centenary in Napier of the Congregation of Our Lady of the Missions, 1865-1965, Daily Telegraph Co, Napier, 1964.
- Ernest Richard Simmons, Brief history of the Catholic Church in New Zealand, Catholic Publications Centre, Auckland, 1978.
- Michael King, God's farthest outpost : a history of Catholics in New Zealand, Viking, Auckland 1997.
- Michael O'Meeghan S.M., Steadfast in hope : the story of the Catholic Archdiocese of Wellington 1850-2000, Dunmore press, Palmerston North, 2003.
