= Cathedral of the Holy Spirit, Palmerston North =

Cathedral of the Holy Spirit
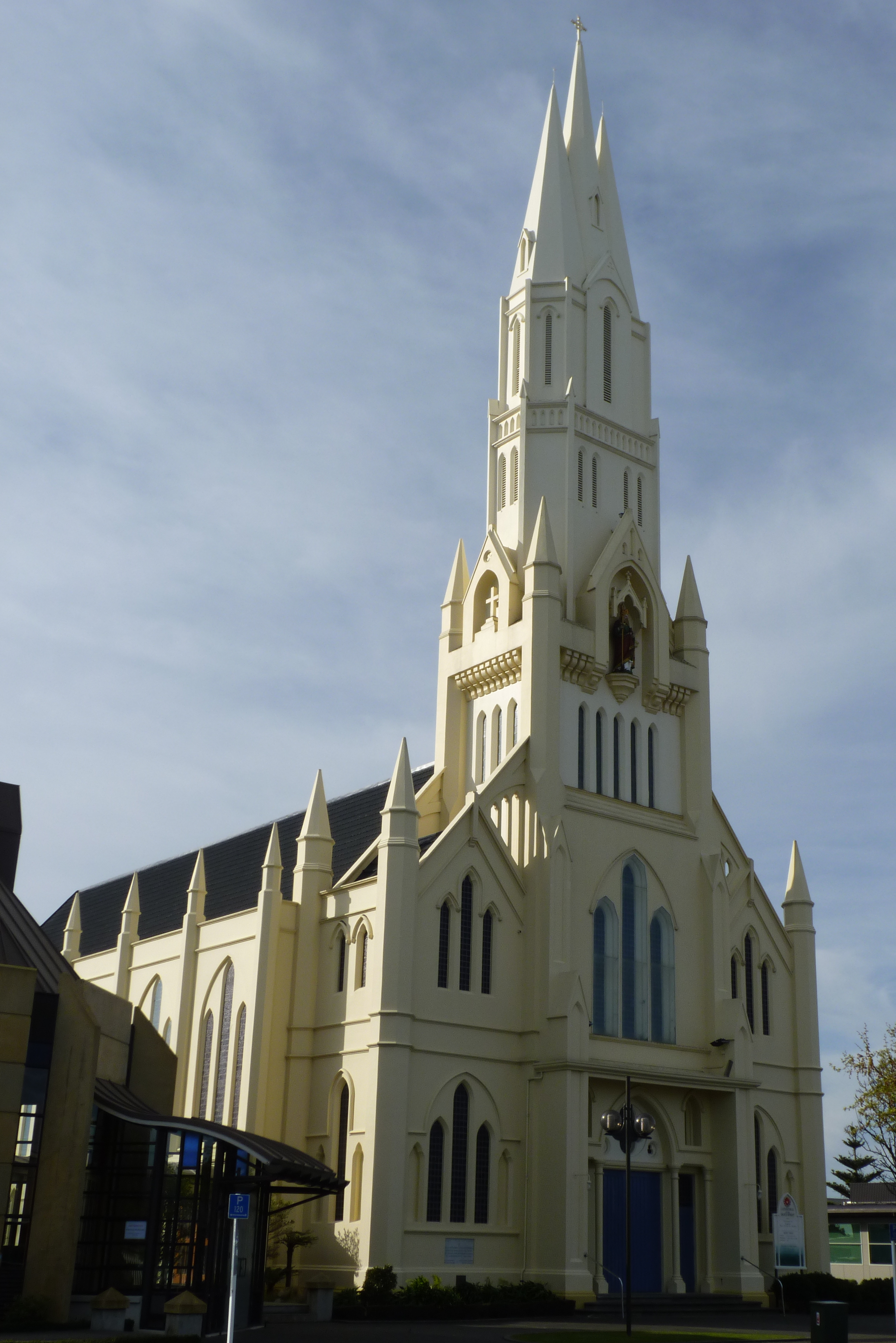
- Cathedral of the Holy Spirit
- 40°21′06″S 175°37′02″E
- Location: 197 Broadway Avenue, Palmerston North
- Country: New Zealand
- Denomination: Catholic
- Website: pncathedral.org.nz

History
- Former name: St Patrick's Church
- Founded: 1925
- Dedication: Holy Spirit
- Dedicated: 22 March 1925

Architecture
- Heritage designation: Category 1 (List No. 195)
- Designated: 28 June`1990
- Architect: Frederick de Jersey Clere
- Architectural type: Reinforced concrete
- Style: Neo-Gothic
- Completed: 1925
- Construction cost: £43,845

Administration
- Diocese: Palmerston North, New Zealand
- Parish: Cathedral of the Holy Spirit Parish

Clergy
- Bishop: John Adams

The Cathedral of the Holy Spirit is the cathedral of the Roman Catholic Diocese of Palmerston North, New Zealand. It opened in 1925 as St Patrick's Church and was rededicated to the Holy Spirit as the cathedral when the diocese was established in 1980. In 1988, the cathedral was renovated, expanded and reordered. The building was designated a Category 1 historic place by the New Zealand Historic Places Trust in 1990.

== Design ==
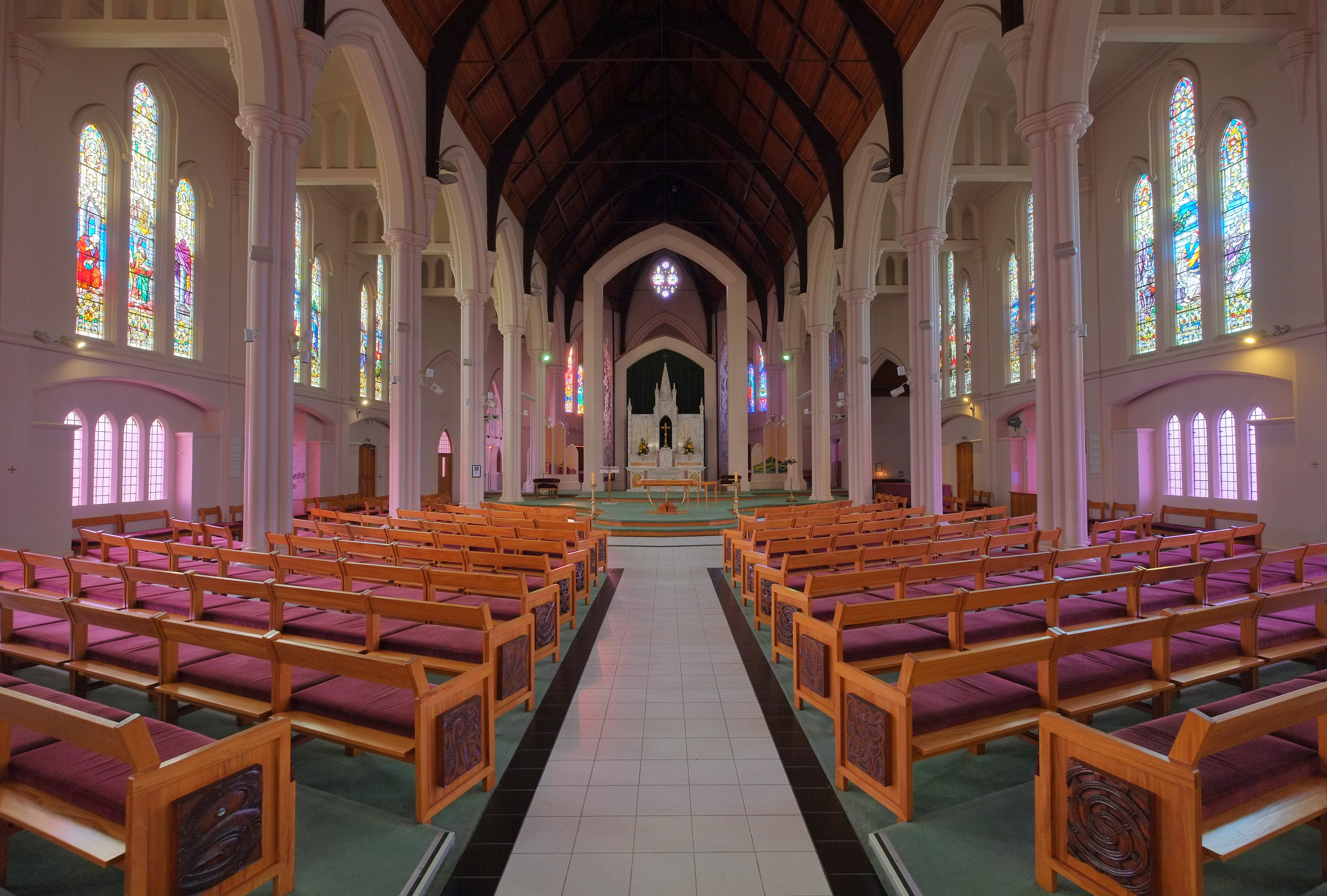
Nave

The building was designed by the notable architect Frederick de Jersey Clere. The Gothic Revival style cathedral is constructed in reinforced concrete with ornamental Gothic elements such as lancet windows, a pointed arch and pinnacles, and its design includes most typical elements of a cathedral layout. The nave is flanked by seven structural columns on each side which support pointed arches. The two side aisles feature 10 stained glass windows depicting the 10 parables of Jesus, designed by Franz Xaver Zettler from Munich. The cathedral also houses 25 Māori carvings from the six iwi in the diocese.

== Parish Priests of St Patrick's Parish 1875-1980 ==
- Fr Delphin Moreau S.M. 1875-1883
- Fr Denn P. Carew S.M. 1883-1884
- Fr M. MacManus 1884-1886
- Fr J. F. Patterson 1886-1899
- Fr P. W. Tymons 1899-1906
- Fr P. C. Costello 1906-1913
- Mons James MacManus 1913-1962
- Fr Bernard M. Keegan 1963-1971
- Fr D. P. O'Neil 1971
- Fr T. A. Duffy 1972-

== Parish Priests of the Cathedral of the Holy Spirit 1980-Current ==
- Fr Peter Fahy 2010-2016
- Mons Brian Walsh 2016-2021
- (Acting Parish Priest) Fr Joe Grayland 2021-Current
