= Gifted Education Centre =

- Founded: 1995
- Purpose: Gifted education
- Location(s): Auckland, New Zealand
- Region served: New Zealand
- Key people: Kathy Williams, Sue Breen
- Website: www.giftededucation.org.nz

The Gifted Education Centre is a gifted education organisation in New Zealand. At the start of 2008 it changed its name from the George Parkyn Centre.

The George Parkyn Centre was formed in 1995 to help gifted children.

== One Day School ==
The One Day School was founded in 1996 by Rosemary Cathcart. The first branch that was created was in Central Auckland. There are branches countrywide including Nelson, Tauranga, Hamilton, Wellington and Christchurch.

One day each week students do not attend regular school but instead attend One Day School. To attend One Day School a cognitive abilities test needs to be taken and people are accepted if they are found to be in the top 5% relative to the participant's age. One Day School operates throughout New Zealand in school classrooms not being used for normal lessons. There is a cost, currently NZ$60 per week. The Gifted Education Centre can sometimes offer some fee subsidies and is currently trying to reduce the overall cost. The Gifted Education Centre also provides the on-line service GO!, aka Gifted Online, a programme for students wanting to attend One Day School, but do not live within an area near a One Day School classroom. Several thousand gifted children have attended the One Day School since its inception.

=== Curriculum ===
At One Day School there is a set format to the day. There is generally a topic for the term. It is usually broad such as time, identity, strength, etc. Then each week a new subtopic is covered such as time travel, nations' identities, strength in relationships, etc. The day is divided into three parts-Think/Reason/Discuss, Read/Write/Research and Make/Do/Create. Think/Reason/Discuss is where the teacher introduces the topic and prompts discussion. Later in Read/Write/Research students do as the name suggests. It is also so for Make/Do/Create.

In May 2014 the Gifted Education Centre and Gifted Kids merged to become the New Zealand Centre for Gifted Education.

== See also ==
- Education in New Zealand
