= 2016 Rangitikei District Council election =

- 8 October 2016

The 2016 Rangitikei District Council election was held across the Rangitikei District of Manawatū-Whanganui, New Zealand, between 16 September and 8 October. These elections were for the offices of Mayor of Rangitikei, eleven members of the Rangitikei District Council, four members each of two community boards, and seven members of the Whanganui District Health Board; these elections were part of the New Zealand-wide local elections. Postal ballots will be issued to all registered voters.

The incumbent mayor was Andy Watson, who on 9 June announced his intention on seeking re-election. First past the post (FPP) was to be used for all elections except the District Health Board elections which used single transferable vote (STV).

The previous elections took place in October 2013 and the following will take place in October 2019.

== Dates ==
Following are the key dates for the local elections:

Date	Event
15 July	Nominations open for candidates.
12 August	Nominations close at noon.
17 August	Election date and candidates’ names publicised by electoral officers.
16–21 September	Voting documents delivered to households. Electors can post the documents back to electoral officers as soon as they have voted.
8 October	Polling day — all documents must be at the council before voting closes at noon. Preliminary results (i.e. once all ordinary votes are counted) will be available as soon as possible afterwards.
13–19 October	Official results (including all valid ordinary and special votes) declared.

== Mayor ==
The incumbent Mayor of Rangitikei was Andy Watson, first elected in 2013. Watson sought re-election and contested the election along with community patrol chair George London and civil engineer Rob Snijders.

Incumbent mayor Watson was declared re-elected on 13 October 2016.

2016 Rangitikei mayoral election
Party	Candidate	Votes	%	±%
Independent	Andy Watson	3,638	77.35	+35.88
Independent	Robert Snijders	700	14.88	—
Independent	George London	365	7.76	—
Majority		2,938	62.47	+52.31
Total valid votes		4,703	99.87	+0.24
Informal votes		6	0.13	−0.24
Turnout		4,781	47.86	−1.36
Registered electors		9,989		

== District council ==
=== Bulls ward ===
The Bulls ward elected two councillors. The incumbent councillors were Tim Harris and Rebecca McNeil. Harris and McNeil both sought re-election.

Both incumbents lost re-election to new candidates Platt and Dunn.

Rangitikei District Council election, 2016 – Bulls Ward
Party	Candidate	Votes	%	±%
Independent	Graeme Platt	560	40.14	—
Independent	Jane Dunn	386	27.67	—
Independent	Tim Harris	300	21.51	−10.31
Independent	Rebecca McNeil	149	10.68	−27.32
Total valid votes		1,395	99.93	−0.07
Informal votes		1	0.07	+0.07
Turnout		1,396		

=== Hunterville ward ===
The Hunterville ward elected one councillor. The incumbent councillor is Dean McManaway, the deputy mayor. McManaway, who was elected unopposed in 2013, was elected unopposed for a second consecutive time in 2016.

Rangitikei District Council election, 2016 – Hunterville Ward
Party	Candidate	Votes	%	±%
Independent	Dean McManaway	Unopposed	100.00	±0.00
Total valid votes		N/A	100.00	
Informal votes		N/A	0.00	
Turnout		N/A		

=== Marton ward ===
The Marton ward elected four councillors. The incumbent councillors were Cath Ash, Nigel Belsham, Mike Jones and Lynne Sheridan. Ash, Belsham and Sheridan sought re-election; Jones retired from politics.

Belsham, Sheridan and Ash were all re-elected; Dave Wilson was elected.

Rangitikei District Council election, 2016 – Marton Ward
Party	Candidate	Votes	%	±%
Independent	Nigel Belsham	1,726	20.75	+3.49
Independent	Dave Wilson	1,347	16.19	—
Independent	Cath Ash	1,146	13.77	+4.34
Independent	Lynne Sheridan	897	10.78	+0.07
Independent	Brendon Williams	882	10.60	—
Independent	Anne George	651	7.82	—
Independent	Robert Snijders	615	7.39	—
Independent	George London	368	4.42	—
Independent	Steve Costelloe	367	4.41	—
Independent	Carolyn Bates	321	3.86	—
Total valid votes		8,320	99.84	−0.09
Informal votes		13	0.16	+0.09
Turnout		8,333		

=== Taihape ward ===
The Taihape ward elected three councillors. The incumbent councillors were Richard Aslett, Angus Gordon and Ruth Rainey. All three incumbents are seeking re-election.

All three incumbents were re-elected.

Rangitikei District Council election, 2016 – Taihape Ward
Party	Candidate	Votes	%	±%
Independent	Angus Gordon	785	30.71	+5.41
Independent	Ruth Rainey	761	29.77	+5.92
Independent	Richard Aslett	670	26.21	+5.76
Independent	Etain McDonnell	340	13.30	—
Total valid votes		2,556	99.88	−0.08
Informal votes		3	0.12	+0.08
Turnout		2,559		

=== Turakina ward ===
The Turakina ward elected one councillor. The incumbent councillor is Soraya Peke-Mason. Peke-Mason, who was elected unopposed in 2013, was elected unopposed for a second consecutive term.

Rangitikei District Council election, 2016 – Turakina Ward
Party	Candidate	Votes	%	±%
Independent	Soraya Peke-Mason	Unopposed	100.00	±0.00
Total valid votes		N/A	100.00	
Informal votes		N/A	0.00	
Turnout		N/A		

== Community boards ==
=== Ratana Community Board ===
The Ratana Community Board is composed of four members. The incumbent members were Maata Kare Thompson, Nadine Rawhiti, Bjorn Barlien and Tama Biddle.

Thompson was re-elected and Rawhiti lost her seat. Charlie Mete, Charlie Rourangi and Thomas Tautaurangi were also elected.

Rangitikei District Council election, 2016 – Ratana Community Board
Party	Candidate	Votes	%	±%
Independent	Charlie Mete	91	24.86	—
Independent	Charlie Rourangi	74	20.22	—
Independent	Thomas Tataurangi	65	17.76	—
Independent	Maata Kare Thompson	58	15.85	—
Independent	Nadine Rawhiti	48	13.11	—
Independent	Stephen Nelson	30	8.20	—
Total valid votes		366	100.00	—
Informal votes		0	0.00	—
Turnout		366		

=== Taihape Community Board ===
The Taihape Community Board is composed of four members. The incumbent members were Michelle Fannin, Gail Larsen, Peter Oliver and Yvonne Sicely. Fannin, Larsen and Sicely were re-elected unopposed and Ann Abernathy was elected unopposed also.

Rangitikei District Council election, 2016 – Taihape Community Board
Party	Candidate	Votes	%	±%
Independent	Ann Abernathy	Unopposed	100.00	—
Independent	Michelle Fannin	Unopposed	100.00	—
Independent	Gail Larsen	Unopposed	100.00	—
Independent	Yvonne Sicely	Unopposed	100.00	—
Total valid votes		N/A	100.00	
Informal votes		N/A	0.00	
Turnout		N/A		

== Regional election ==
As part of the Manawatū-Whanganui region, Rangitikei electors form part of the Manawatu-Rangitikei constituency of the Horizons Regional Council. This constituency elects two members. The incumbent councillors were chairman Bruce Gordon and Gordon McKellar. Both incumbents were re-elected unopposed.

Horizons Regional Council election, 2016 – Manawatu-Rangitikei
Party	Candidate	Votes	%	±%
Independent	Bruce Gordon	Unopposed	100.00	—
Independent	Gordon McKellar	Unopposed	100.00	—
Total valid votes		N/A	100.00	
Informal votes		N/A	0.00	
Turnout		N/A		

== District health board election ==
Rangitikei District is part of the Whanganui District Health Board (WDHB), one of 20 district health boards in New Zealand. The WDHB consists of seven elected members and up to four members appointed by the Minister of Health. The incumbent elected members were Allan Anderson, Philippa Baker-Hogan, Jenny Duncan, Kate Joblin, Judith MacDonald and Ray Stevens. Baker-Hogan, Duncan, MacDonald and Stevens were running for re-election, with eleven other candidates running including incumbent Mayor of Whanganui Annette Main.

Baker-Hogan, Duncan and MacDonald were re-elected; Stevens lost re-election. Annette Main, Charlie Anderson, Graham Adams, and Stuart Hylton were also elected. This election used the single transferable vote (STV) electoral system.

Whanganui District Health Board election, 2016 – At-large
Party	Candidate	Votes	%	±%
Independent	Annette Main	4,235	20.55	—
Independent	Charlie Anderson	3,009	14.60	—
Independent	Philippa Baker-Hogan	2,906	14.10	—
Independent	Judith MacDonald	2,545.78	12.35	—
Independent	Jenny Duncan	2,509.08	12.18	—
Independent	Graham Adams	2,497.09	12.12	—
Independent	Stuart Graeme Hylton	2,372.75	11.51	—
Independent	Ray Stevens	2,244.89	10.89	—
Independent	Kiritahi Firmin	1,596.79	7.75	—
Independent	Rob Vinsen	1,229.34	5.97	—
Independent	Christie Teki-Reu	1,054.50	5.12	—
Independent	Susan Osborne	863.19	4.19	—
Independent	Wendy Stanbrook-Mason	768.80	3.73	—
Independent	Rangi M. Wills	640.11	3.11	—
Independent	Ngaire Ellwood	404.25	1.96	—
Total valid votes		20,606	94.37	—
Informal votes		1,229	5.63	—
Turnout		21,835		

== See also ==
- 2013 Rangitikei local elections
- 2016 Rangitikei mayoral election
- 2016 New Zealand local elections
