= Parewanui =

Settlement in New Zealand

- Interactive map of Parewanui
- Coordinates: 40.264°S 175.286°E}
- Country: New Zealand
- Region: Manawatū-Whanganui
- District: Rangitikei District
- Wards: Southern General Ward; Tiikeitia ki Tai (Coastal) Māori Ward
- Electorates: Rangitīkei; Te Tai Hauāuru (Māori)

Government
  - Territorial Authority: Rangitikei District Council
  - Regional council: Horizons Regional Council
  - Mayor of Rangitikei: Andy Watson
  - Rangitīkei MP: Suze Redmayne
  - Te Tai Hauāuru MP: Debbie Ngarewa-Packer

Area
  - Total: 64.30 km^{2} (24.83 sq mi)

Population (2023 Census)
  - Total: 162
  - Density: 2.52/km^{2} (6.53/sq mi)

Parewanui is a settlement situated southeast of Bulls in the North Island of New Zealand.

== History ==
The area was named for Parewanui Pā, one of several populated by Ngāti Apa in the early 19th century. The pā site was purchased by the government as part of the Rangitikei Manawatū block in 1866.

A Parewanui School flourished by 1885 but closed at the beginning of 2003.

=== Wheriko Church ===
Wheriko Church is a historic Anglican church in Parewanui. Built in 1862 it was originally called Christ's Church but was later named to Wheriko, Māori for Jericho. The church was relocated in 1897 following a flood. The church was rededicated in 1962 following renovation work.

== Demographics ==
Parewanui locality covers 64.30 km^{2} (24.83 sq mi). It is part of the larger Parewanui statistical area.

Historical population for the locality
Year	Pop.	±% p.a.
2006	204	—
2013	201	−0.21%
2018	183	−1.86%
2023	162	−2.41%

Parewanui had a population of 162 in the 2023 New Zealand census, a decrease of 21 people (−11.5%) since the 2018 census, and a decrease of 39 people (−19.4%) since the 2013 census. There were 84 males and 81 females in 75 dwellings. 1.9% of people identified as LGBTIQ+. The median age was 50.6 years (compared with 38.1 years nationally). There were 21 people (13.0%) aged under 15 years, 27 (16.7%) aged 15 to 29, 78 (48.1%) aged 30 to 64, and 39 (24.1%) aged 65 or older.

People could identify as more than one ethnicity. The results were 90.7% European (Pākehā), 20.4% Māori, 1.9% Asian, and 3.7% other, which includes people giving their ethnicity as "New Zealander". English was spoken by 100.0%, Māori by 3.7%, and other languages by 1.9%. No language could be spoken by 1.9% (e.g. too young to talk). The percentage of people born overseas was 7.4, compared with 28.8% nationally.

Religious affiliations were 24.1% Christian, and 1.9% New Age. People who answered that they had no religion were 64.8%, and 7.4% of people did not answer the census question.

Of those at least 15 years old, 15 (10.6%) people had a bachelor's or higher degree, 87 (61.7%) had a post-high school certificate or diploma, and 36 (25.5%) people exclusively held high school qualifications. The median income was $32,400, compared with $41,500 nationally. 9 people (6.4%) earned over $100,000 compared to 12.1% nationally. The employment status of those at least 15 was 63 (44.7%) full-time, 18 (12.8%) part-time, and 3 (2.1%) unemployed.

=== Parawanui statistical area ===
Parewanui statistical area covers 266.94 km^{2} (103.07 sq mi) and had an estimated population of 880 as of June 2025, with a population density of 3.3 people per km^{2}.

Historical population for the statistical area
Year	Pop.	±% p.a.
2006	786	—
2013	849	+1.11%
2018	855	+0.14%
2023	864	+0.21%

The statistical area had a population of 864 in the 2023 New Zealand census, an increase of 9 people (1.1%) since the 2018 census, and an increase of 15 people (1.8%) since the 2013 census. There were 432 males and 429 females in 342 dwellings. 1.4% of people identified as LGBTIQ+. The median age was 45.5 years (compared with 38.1 years nationally). There were 159 people (18.4%) aged under 15 years, 132 (15.3%) aged 15 to 29, 429 (49.7%) aged 30 to 64, and 147 (17.0%) aged 65 or older.

People could identify as more than one ethnicity. The results were 93.4% European (Pākehā); 18.4% Māori; 1.4% Pasifika; 0.7% Asian; 0.3% Middle Eastern, Latin American and African New Zealanders (MELAA); and 2.8% other, which includes people giving their ethnicity as "New Zealander". English was spoken by 97.6%, Māori by 3.1%, Samoan by 0.7%, and other languages by 2.1%. No language could be spoken by 1.7% (e.g. too young to talk). New Zealand Sign Language was known by 1.4%. The percentage of people born overseas was 8.7, compared with 28.8% nationally.

Religious affiliations were 27.8% Christian, 1.4% Māori religious beliefs, 1.4% New Age, and 0.7% other religions. People who answered that they had no religion were 63.2%, and 6.6% of people did not answer the census question.

Of those at least 15 years old, 105 (14.9%) people had a bachelor's or higher degree, 429 (60.9%) had a post-high school certificate or diploma, and 171 (24.3%) people exclusively held high school qualifications. The median income was $42,100, compared with $41,500 nationally. 63 people (8.9%) earned over $100,000 compared to 12.1% nationally. The employment status of those at least 15 was 378 (53.6%) full-time, 108 (15.3%) part-time, and 9 (1.3%) unemployed.

== Climate ==
Climate data for Parewanui (1981–2010)
Month	Jan	Feb	Mar	Apr	May	Jun	Jul	Aug	Sep	Oct	Nov	Dec	Year
Mean daily maximum °C (°F)	22.1 (71.8)	22.5 (72.5)	21.2 (70.2)	18.5 (65.3)	15.9 (60.6)	13.6 (56.5)	12.9 (55.2)	13.7 (56.7)	15.1 (59.2)	16.3 (61.3)	18.3 (64.9)	20.6 (69.1)	17.6 (63.6)
Daily mean °C (°F)	17.5 (63.5)	17.6 (63.7)	16.1 (61.0)	13.6 (56.5)	11.3 (52.3)	9.3 (48.7)	8.3 (46.9)	9.1 (48.4)	10.9 (51.6)	12.3 (54.1)	13.9 (57.0)	16.2 (61.2)	13.0 (55.4)
Mean daily minimum °C (°F)	12.9 (55.2)	12.7 (54.9)	11.0 (51.8)	8.6 (47.5)	6.7 (44.1)	4.9 (40.8)	3.7 (38.7)	4.4 (39.9)	6.6 (43.9)	8.3 (46.9)	9.5 (49.1)	11.8 (53.2)	8.4 (47.2)
Average rainfall mm (inches)	63 (2.5)	57 (2.2)	66 (2.6)	63 (2.5)	83 (3.3)	82 (3.2)	90 (3.5)	78 (3.1)	71 (2.8)	72 (2.8)	61 (2.4)	85 (3.3)	871 (34.2)
Source: NIWA (rain 1961–1990)

== See also ==
- Flock House
