= 2016 Rangitikei mayoral election =

Local election in New Zealand

- 8 October 2016
Candidate	Andy Watson	Robert Snijders	George London
Party	Independent	Independent	Independent
Popular vote	3,638	700	365
Percentage	77.35	14.88	7.76
Mayor before election
Andy Watson
Elected mayor
Andy Watson

The 2016 Rangitikei mayoral election were part of the Rangitikei and wider New Zealand local elections. On 8 October 2016, elections were held for the Mayor of Rangitikei and other local government roles. Incumbent mayor Andy Watson was first elected in 2013 with 41.5% of the vote. Watson announced on 9 June he is running for a second term as mayor. Running against Watson are community patrol chair George London and civil engineer Robert Snijders, all three from Marton.

== Dates ==
Following are the key dates for the mayoral election:

Date	Event
15 July	Nominations open for candidates.
12 August	Nominations close at noon.
17 August	Election date and candidates’ names publicised by electoral officers.
16–21 September	Voting documents delivered to households. Electors can post the documents back to electoral officers as soon as they have voted.
8 October	Polling day — all documents must be at the council before voting closes at noon. Preliminary results (i.e. once all ordinary votes are counted) will be available as soon as possible afterwards.
13–19 October	Official results (including all valid ordinary and special votes) declared.

== Candidates ==
Incumbent mayor Andy Watson announced on 9 June his intention to run for a second term.

On 9 August candidates George London and Robert Snijders came forward. London is a Queen's Service Medal recipient, given to him for his services to the community; he is a volunteer health shuttle driver for St John Ambulance since 2009 and was elected chairman of the Marton Community Patrol in June 2015.

Snijders is a civil engineer and the new owner of the Old Granary in Marton since July 2016; Snijders and his wife aim to restore the building—a Heritage New Zealand Category II building—which had burnt down in March 2013.

== Campaign ==
On 28 July, as no other candidates had yet come forward, mayor Watson encouraged other candidates to stand for the mayoral election saying "It would be poor democracy if there were no more names put forward". Watson voiced his drive as being the number of projects he had initiated that he wanted to see through, and the district being faced with fairly major challenges around earthquake infrastructure.

Snijder's view on the council is that "it needed to be more engaged with the community". Snijder has been a civil engineer working in Libya, Russia and England doing urban rejuvenation. "With my construction background I feel I'm more than qualified to step in and provide advice and expertise on costs and how to improve the proposed design [of new proposed centres in Bulls, Marton and Taihape]." In addition, Snijder aims to increase tourism in the area.

London, a resident in Marton for 16 years and chair of the Marton Community Patrol, has said the council "needs a 'stronger' leader". Further adding: "I don't think there's a strong enough council there at the moment. They're a bit shy, a bit quiet and I want to be a bit louder and get out there more".

== Results ==
The results were released on 31 October 2016.

Rangitikei mayoral election, 2016
Party	Candidate	Votes	%	±%
Independent	Andy Watson	3,638	77.35	+35.88
Independent	Robert Snijders	700	14.88	—
Independent	George London	365	7.76	—
Majority		2,938	62.47	+52.31
Total valid votes		4,703	99.87	+0.24
Informal votes		6	0.13	−0.24
Turnout		4,781	47.86	−1.36
Registered electors		9,989		

== See also ==
- 2016 Rangitikei local elections
- 2016 New Zealand local elections
