= 2010 Rangitikei District Council election =

- 9 October 2010

The 2010 Rangitikei District Council election was held across the Rangitikei District of Manawatū-Whanganui, New Zealand, for the offices of Mayor of Rangitikei and eleven members of the Rangitikei District Council on 9 October 2010. They were held as part of the 2010 New Zealand local elections. Postal ballots were issued to 10,068 registered voters, and were returned from 17 September to 9 October. Across the district, 3,619 people cast votes, a voter turnout of 47%.

Chalky Leary was re-elected as mayor unopposed, becoming the first mayor in 21 years to be re-elected without a challenge. First past the post (FPP) was used to elect the eleven members of the Rangitikei District Council—four from the Marton ward, three from the Taihape ward, two from the Bulls ward and one each from the Hunterville and Turakina wards.

The previous local elections took place in October 2007 and the following elections in October 2013.

== Mayor ==
2010 Rangitikei mayoral election
- 9 October 2010
Candidate	Chalky Leary
Party	Independent
Popular vote	Unopposed
Percentage	100.00
Mayor before election
Chalky Leary
Elected mayor
Chalky Leary

As there were no other candidates, Chalky Leary was re-elected unopposed.

Rangitikei mayoral election, 2010
Party	Candidate	Votes	%	±%
Independent	Chalky Leary	Unopposed	100.00	+69.03
Total valid votes		N/A	100.00	
Informal votes		N/A	0.00	
Turnout		N/A		

== District council ==
=== Bulls ward ===
The two candidates with the most votes were elected, shown in the table below by a green tick. Candidates shown with a cross lost their seats as incumbent councillors.

Rangitikei District Council election, 2010 – Bulls Ward
Party	Candidate	Votes	%	±%
Independent	Sarah Harris	481	42.98	−57.02
Independent	Michelle Fox	434	38.78	—
Independent	Jill Strugnell	204	18.23	−81.77
Total valid votes		1,119	100.00	
Informal votes		0	0.00	
Turnout		1,124		

=== Hunterville ward ===
The candidate with the most votes was elected, shown in the table below by a green tick. Candidates shown with a cross lost their seats as incumbent councillors.

Rangitikei District Council election, 2010 – Hunterville Ward
Party	Candidate	Votes	%	±%
Independent	Dean McManaway	448	83.90	—
Independent	Grant Collie	86	16.10	−2.67
Total valid votes		534	100.00	
Informal votes		N/A	0.00	
Turnout		537		

=== Marton ward ===
The four candidates with the most votes were elected, shown in the table below by a green tick. Candidates shown with a cross lost their seats as incumbent councillors.

Rangitikei District Council election, 2010 – Marton Ward
Party	Candidate	Votes	%	±%
Independent	Andy Watson	1,408	18.85	−3.14
Independent	Lynne Sheridan	1,119	14.98	−4.82
Independent	Mike Jones	1,048	14.03	−2.31
Independent	Richard Peirce	771	10.32	−4.07
Independent	Kathleen Murphy	707	9.46	−6.45
Independent	Anne George	701	9.38	—
Independent	Michelle Bisset	605	8.10	—
Independent	Belinda Howard	569	7.62	—
Independent	Sharon Brosnan	542	7.26	—
Total valid votes		7,470	99.91	
Informal votes		7	0.09	
Turnout		7,491		

=== Taihape ward ===
As there were no other candidates, all three candidates were elected unopposed.

Rangitikei District Council election, 2010 – Taihape Ward
Party	Candidate	Votes	%	±%
Independent	Richard Aslett	Unopposed	100.00	—
Independent	Jan Byford	Unopposed	100.00	—
Independent	Ed Cherry	Unopposed	100.00	—
Total valid votes		N/A	100.00	
Informal votes		N/A	0.00	
Turnout		N/A		

=== Turakina ward ===
The candidate with the most votes was elected, shown in the table below by a green tick.

Rangitikei District Council election, 2010 – Turakina Ward
Party	Candidate	Votes	%	±%
Independent	Soraya Peke-Mason	230	61.17	+16.34
Independent	Andrew Stewart	146	38.83	—
Total valid votes		376	100.00	
Informal votes		0	0.00	
Turnout		380		

== See also ==
- 2013 Rangitikei local elections
- 2010 New Zealand local elections
