= Ngamatea =

Rural community in Hawke's Bay, New Zealand

- Rural community
- Interactive map of Ngamatea
- Coordinates: 39°24′25.2029″S 176°07′42.4124″E
- Country: New Zealand
- Region: Hawke's Bay
- Territorial authority: Rangitikei District
- Wards: Northern General Ward; Tiikeitia ki Uta (Inland) Māori Ward
- Community: Taihape Community
- Electorates: Rangitīkei; Te Tai Hauāuru (Māori)

Government
  - Territorial Authority: Rangitikei District Council
  - Regional council: Hawke's Bay Regional Council
  - Mayor of Rangitikei: Andy Watson
  - Rangitīkei MP: Suze Redmayne
  - Te Tai Hauāuru MP: Debbie Ngarewa-Packer

Area
  - Total: 611.57 km^{2} (236.13 sq mi)

Population (June 2025)
  - Total: 20
  - Density: 0.033/km^{2} (0.085/sq mi)

Ngamatea is a rural community, in the northeastern part of Rangitikei District, in the Hawke's Bay region of New Zealand's North Island. The rest of the Rangitikei District is located in the Manawatū-Whanganui region.

Ngamatea has been farmed by Europeans since the 1870s. Ngamatea is far away from many of the comforts of modern civilisation.

The area includes Ngamatea Station, a 70,000 hectare high country sheep and beef station, with areas for free-range sika deer hunting and trout fishing. It is one of the most vast and remote stations in New Zealand.

== Climate ==
Climate data for Ngamatea Station, elevation 885 m (2,904 ft), (1984–1990)
Month	Jan	Feb	Mar	Apr	May	Jun	Jul	Aug	Sep	Oct	Nov	Dec	Year
Record high °C (°F)	26.0 (78.8)	25.6 (78.1)	25.5 (77.9)	20.5 (68.9)	18.0 (64.4)	16.8 (62.2)	14.0 (57.2)	14.2 (57.6)	18.1 (64.6)	21.1 (70.0)	22.0 (71.6)	24.1 (75.4)	26.0 (78.8)
Mean maximum °C (°F)	25.1 (77.2)	23.2 (73.8)	22.9 (73.2)	19.1 (66.4)	16.9 (62.4)	14.6 (58.3)	12.4 (54.3)	13.0 (55.4)	15.4 (59.7)	18.5 (65.3)	20.7 (69.3)	22.4 (72.3)	25.3 (77.5)
Mean daily maximum °C (°F)	20.1 (68.2)	19.0 (66.2)	16.7 (62.1)	14.1 (57.4)	10.8 (51.4)	8.6 (47.5)	7.3 (45.1)	8.7 (47.7)	10.5 (50.9)	13.2 (55.8)	15.6 (60.1)	17.9 (64.2)	13.5 (56.4)
Daily mean °C (°F)	14.2 (57.6)	13.3 (55.9)	11.3 (52.3)	8.7 (47.7)	6.4 (43.5)	4.5 (40.1)	3.5 (38.3)	4.4 (39.9)	6.1 (43.0)	8.0 (46.4)	10.3 (50.5)	12.6 (54.7)	8.6 (47.5)
Mean daily minimum °C (°F)	8.3 (46.9)	7.6 (45.7)	5.8 (42.4)	3.3 (37.9)	1.9 (35.4)	0.4 (32.7)	−0.4 (31.3)	0.0 (32.0)	1.6 (34.9)	2.9 (37.2)	5.1 (41.2)	7.2 (45.0)	3.6 (38.6)
Mean minimum °C (°F)	1.4 (34.5)	−0.3 (31.5)	−1.9 (28.6)	−3.0 (26.6)	−4.0 (24.8)	−5.9 (21.4)	−6.2 (20.8)	−5.4 (22.3)	−4.1 (24.6)	−3.6 (25.5)	−1.5 (29.3)	1.0 (33.8)	−7.1 (19.2)
Record low °C (°F)	−1.0 (30.2)	−2.1 (28.2)	−2.0 (28.4)	−5.0 (23.0)	−5.0 (23.0)	−8.2 (17.2)	−8.0 (17.6)	−7.5 (18.5)	−6.8 (19.8)	−5.0 (23.0)	−3.0 (26.6)	−2.2 (28.0)	−8.2 (17.2)
Source: NIWA

== History ==
=== 19th century ===
Māori had some farming in the area before the arrival of Europeans.

Europeans began sheep farming in the area in the 1870s. The initial Ngamatea Station had no boundaries, with sheep and cattle eventually grazing up to 100,000 hectares.

=== 20th century ===
The Fernie family began farming the Ngamatea Station for wool in 1932, after previous farmers had been driven away by rabbits, low prices, and the hard work involved in farming the area.

Musterers would be hired for eight months of the year to bring sheep in from the far reaches of the station, and spending a year on the farm became a rite of passage for many young farmers. Ngamatea became a community of farm workers, cooks, shearers, shepherds, gardeners, rabbit hunters, and "tough, eccentric landowners".

The area remained extremely remote, often taking people several days to travel to.

Colin Wheeler painted the homestead area of the station in 1973, including dogs’ kennels, shepherds’ quarters and other buildings.

In the 1970s and 1980s, Government subsidies were provided to permanently clear tussock and scrub.

=== 21st century ===
By 2006, Ngamatea Station had transitioned to producing prime lamb. However, the station was still hilly, remote back-country, where "tough, self-reliant, real men and women" worked across vast distances.

In 2015, the station was still one of the largest and remote farms in New Zealand.

== Government and politics ==
=== Local government ===
As part of the Rangitikei District, the current Mayor of Rangitikei since 2013 is Andy Watson.

The area forms part of the Northern ward of the Rangitikei District Council, which elects two of the eleven district councillors.

=== Central government ===
The area is part of the general electorate of Rangitīkei and in the Māori electorate of Te Tai Hauāuru. Rangitīkei is a safe National Party seat since the 1938 election with the exception of 1978–1984 when it was held by Bruce Beetham of the Social Credit Party. Since 2011 it is held by Ian McKelvie.

Te Tai Hauāuru is a more unstable seat, having been held by three different parties since 1996, i.e. New Zealand First, the Māori Party and the Labour Party. Since 2014 it is held by Adrian Rurawhe of the Labour Party.

== Demographics ==
The Ngamatea statistical area covers 611.57 km^{2} (236.13 sq mi) and had an estimated population of 20 as of June 2025, with a population density of 0.033 people per km^{2}.

Historical population
Year	Pop.	±% p.a.
2001	30	—
2006	39	+5.39%
2013	27	−5.12%
2018	24	−2.33%
2023	24	+0.00%

Ngamatea had a population of 24 in the 2023 New Zealand census, unchanged since the 2018 census, and a decrease of 3 people (−11.1%) since the 2013 census. There were 12 males and 12 females in 9 dwellings. The median age was 34.7 years (compared with 38.1 years nationally). There were 6 people (25.0%) aged under 15 years, 3 (12.5%) aged 15 to 29, 15 (62.5%) aged 30 to 64, and none aged 65 or older.

People could identify as more than one ethnicity. The results were 75.0% European (Pākehā), and 37.5% Māori. English was spoken by 100.0%, and Māori by 25.0%.

Religious affiliations were 25.0% Christian, and 12.5% Māori religious beliefs. People who answered that they had no religion were 75.0%.

The median income was $60,900, compared with $41,500 nationally. 3 people (16.7%) earned over $100,000 compared to 12.1% nationally. The employment status of those at least 15 was 12 (66.7%) full-time and 3 (16.7%) part-time.
