= 2013 Rangitikei District Council election =

- 12 October 2013

The 2013 Rangitikei District Council election was held across the Rangitikei District of Manawatū-Whanganui, New Zealand, for the offices of Mayor of Rangitikei and eleven members of the Rangitikei District Council on 12 October 2013. They were held as part of the 2013 New Zealand local elections. Postal ballots were issued to 9,866 registered voters, and were returned from 23 September to 12 October. Across the district, 4,856 people cast votes, a voter turnout of 49.22%. Some voters chose not to vote in particular elections or referendums, so voter turnout in individual elections varies from this figure.

Andy Watson was elected as mayor with 41.5% of the vote, defeating incumbent mayor Chalky Leary. First past the post (FPP) was used to elect the eleven members of the Rangitikei District Council—four from the Marton ward, three from the Taihape ward, two from the Bulls ward and one each from the Hunterville and Turakina wards.

The previous local elections took place in October 2010 and the following elections will take place in October 2016.

== Mayor ==
Former two-term deputy mayor Andy Watson was elected, defeating incumbent mayor Chalky Leary by a 486-vote majority.

Rangitikei mayoral election, 2013
| Party | Candidate | Votes | % | ±% |
|---|---|---|---|---|
| Independent | Andy Watson | 1,983 | 41.47 | — |
| Independent | Chalky Leary | 1,497 | 31.30 | −68.70'"`UNIQ−−ref−00000024−QINU`"' |
| Fresh Future Focus | Maree Brannigan | 687 | 14.37 | — |
| Independent | Richard Aslett | 615 | 12.86 | — |
| Majority | | 486 | 10.16 | |
| Total valid votes | | 4,782 | 99.63 | |
| Informal votes | | 18 | 0.38 | |
| Turnout | | 4,856 | 49.22 | |
| Registered electors | | 9,866 | | |

== District council ==
=== Bulls ward ===
The two candidates with the most votes were elected, shown in the table below by a green tick.

Rangitikei District Council election, 2013 – Bulls Ward
| Party | Candidate | Votes | % | ±% |
|---|---|---|---|---|
| Independent | Rebecca McNeil | 461 | 38.00 | — |
| Independent | Tim Harris | 386 | 31.82 | — |
| Independent | Bret Coleman | 366 | 30.17 | — |
| Total valid votes | | 1,213 | 100.00 | |
| Informal votes | | 0 | 0.00 | |
| Turnout | | 1,216 | | |

=== Hunterville ward ===
As there were no other candidates, Dean McManaway was re-elected unopposed.

Rangitikei District Council election, 2013 – Hunterville Ward
| Party | Candidate | Votes | % | ±% |
|---|---|---|---|---|
| Independent | Dean McManaway | Unopposed | 100.00 | +16.10 |
| Total valid votes | | N/A | 100.00 | |
| Informal votes | | N/A | 0.00 | |
| Turnout | | N/A | | |

=== Marton ward ===
The four candidates with the most votes were elected, shown in the table below by a green tick. Candidates shown with a cross lost their seats as incumbent councillors.

Rangitikei District Council election, 2013 – Marton Ward
| Party | Candidate | Votes | % | ±% |
|---|---|---|---|---|
| Independent | Nigel Belsham | 1,473 | 17.26 | — |
| Independent | Andy Watson (Note: Watson was not elected as councillor due to his election as mayor; instead, the fifth-placed candidate was elected.) | 1,266 | 14.84 | −4.01 |
| Independent | Lynne Sheridan | 914 | 10.71 | −4.27 |
| People, Business and Community Pride | Cath Ash | 805 | 9.43 | — |
| Independent | Mike Jones | 776 | 9.09 | −4.94 |
| Independent | Sally Stantiall | 684 | 8.02 | — |
| Independent | Richard Peirce | 611 | 7.16 | −3.16 |
| Independent | Neil Oldfield | 514 | 6.02 | — |
| Independent | Graham Karatau | 458 | 5.37 | — |
| Independent | Kerry Brown | 385 | 4.51 | — |
| Independent | Hamish White | 326 | 3.82 | — |
| For Practical, Win / Win Solutions | Hamish Allan | 321 | 3.76 | — |
| Total valid votes | | 8,533 | 99.93 | |
| Informal votes | | 6 | 0.07 | |
| Turnout | | 8,561 | | |

=== Taihape ward ===
The three candidates with the most votes were elected, shown in the table below by a green tick. Candidates shown with a cross lost their seats as incumbent councillors.

Rangitikei District Council election, 2013 – Taihape Ward
| Party | Candidate | Votes | % | ±% |
|---|---|---|---|---|
| Independent | Angus Gordon | 684 | 25.30 | — |
| Independent | Ruth Rainey | 645 | 23.85 | — |
| Independent | Richard Aslett | 553 | 20.45 | −79.55 |
| Independent | Jan Byford | 415 | 15.35 | −84.65 |
| Independent | Ed Cherry | 407 | 15.05 | −84.95 |
| Total valid votes | | 2,704 | 99.96 | |
| Informal votes | | 1 | 0.04 | |
| Turnout | | 2,715 | | |

=== Turakina ward ===
As there were no other candidates, Soraya Peke-Mason was re-elected unopposed.

Rangitikei District Council election, 2013 – Turakina Ward
| Party | Candidate | Votes | % | ±% |
|---|---|---|---|---|
| Independent | Soraya Peke-Mason | Unopposed | 100.00 | +38.83 |
| Total valid votes | | N/A | 100.00 | |
| Informal votes | | N/A | 0.00 | |
| Turnout | | N/A | | |

== See also ==
- 2013 Rangitikei mayoral election
- 2013 New Zealand local elections
