= 2013 Rangitikei mayoral election =

Local election in New Zealand

- 12 October 2013
Candidate	Andy Watson	Chalky Leary
Party	Independent	Independent
Popular vote	1,983	1,497
Percentage	41.47	31.30
Mayor before election
Chalky Leary
Elected mayor
Andy Watson

The 2013 Rangitikei mayoral election was part of the Rangitikei and wider New Zealand local elections. On 12 October 2013, elections were held for the Mayor of Rangitikei and other local government roles. The incumbent, Robert "Chalky" Leary, ran against three other candidates and lost re-election to Andy Watson who was elected with 41.5% of the vote, a 486-vote majority over Leary whose vote share succumbed to 31.3%.

== Candidates ==
Four candidates stood for election:

- Richard Aslett
- Maree Brannigan (Fresh Future Focus)
- Chalky Leary
- Andy Watson

== Campaign ==
For the first time since 2007 there was a contested election for the Rangitikei mayoralty, as in 2010 incumbent mayor Chalky Leary was elected unopposed. On 26 June former deputy mayor Andy Watson announced his intention to run for mayor, campaigning on a more transparent council and an establishment of a finance committee. Incumbent Chalky Leary was standing for a third term in office and campaigned on a no excess and no frills council whose significant work included the Hunterville and Taihape sewerage schemes.

Mangaweka-based councillor Richard Aslett and executive officer of Rural Education Activities Programme Maree Brannigan announced their candidacies in August. Aslett's campaign was based on improving population and visitor growth principally, as well as saving services, scrapping a possible amalgamation and lowering rates. Brannigan, running on a Fresh Future Focus platform, campaigned on achieving a stable rural economy to ensure the continued thriving of business, environment and families in the Rangitikei District.

== Results ==
Rangitikei mayoral election, 2013
Party	Candidate	Votes	%	±%
Independent	Andy Watson	1,983	41.47	—
Independent	Chalky Leary	1,497	31.30	−68.70'"`UNIQ−−ref−00000029−QINU`"'
Fresh Future Focus	Maree Brannigan	687	14.37	—
Independent	Richard Aslett	615	12.86	—
Majority		486	10.16	
Total valid votes		4,782	99.63	
Informal votes		18	0.38	
Turnout		4,856	49.22	
Registered electors		9,866		

Note that blank votes are not included.

== See also ==
- Rangitikei District Council
- 2013 Rangitikei local elections
- 2013 New Zealand local elections
