= Rangitikei College =

State secondary school in New Zealand

Location
- 24 Bredins Line, Marton, New Zealand; 40.0683195°S 175.3853065°E

Information
- Type: State secondary coeducational
- Motto: "Quality education in a rural setting"
- Ministry of Education Institution no.: 195
- Principal: Tony Booker
- Enrolment: 328 (July 2026)
- Socio-economic decile: 3 (July 2026)
- Website: rangitikeicollege.school.nz

Rangitikei College, formerly known as Marton District High School, is a state secondary coeducational school located in Marton, Rangitikei District, New Zealand. It is located towards the east of the town centre on 24 Bredins Line.

The school provides education for students in years 9–13.

== History ==
Since late 2015 Rangitikei College's principal is Tony Booker, who formerly had been the deputy principal of Nga Tawa Diocesan School and St Peter's College, Palmerston North. Until 2015 the principal was Karene Biggs. Prime Minister John Key visited the school in September 2015, along with Rangitikei MP Ian McKelvie, and gave a speech encouraging students to have confidence in their abilities and to follow their goals.

In 2016 the school introduced an "Inspire Programme" to provide customised learning and mentoring to the most motivated students.

== Enrolment ==
As of July 2026, Rangitikei College has a roll of 328 students, of which 129 (39.3%) identify as Māori.

As of 2026, the school has an Equity Index of 515, placing it amongst schools whose students have many socioeconomic barriers to achievement (roughly equivalent to deciles 2 and 3 under the former socio-economic decile system).

== Notable alumni ==
- Edward Gordon, Member of Parliament
- Neil Thimbleby, All Black and Hawke's Bay rugby representative
- Louise Signal, professor of public health

== See also ==
- List of schools in Manawatu-Wanganui
