= Bulls, New Zealand =

Town in Manawatū-Whanganui, New Zealand

Bulls
- Minor urban area
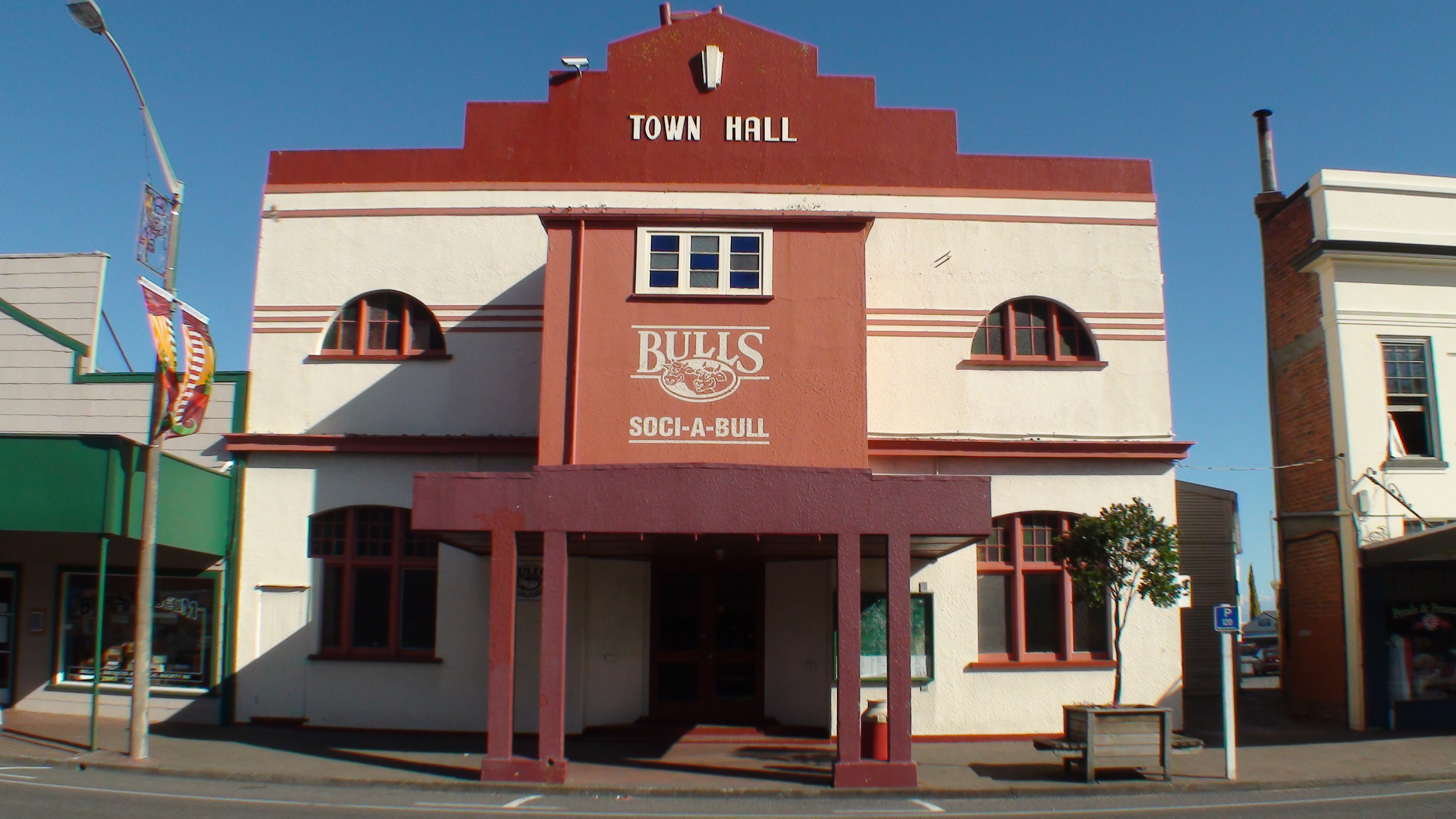
- Bulls Town Hall
- Interactive map of Bulls
- Coordinates: 40°10′S 175°23′E
- Country: New Zealand
- Region: Manawatū-Whanganui
- District: Rangitikei District
- Wards: Southern General Ward; Tiikeitia ki Tai (Coastal) Māori Ward
- Electorates: Rangitīkei; Te Tai Hauāuru (Māori)

Government
  - Territorial Authority: Rangitikei District Council
  - Regional council: Horizons Regional Council
  - Mayor of Rangitikei: Andy Watson
  - Rangitīkei MP: Suze Redmayne
  - Te Tai Hauāuru MP: Debbie Ngarewa-Packer

Area
  - Total: 6.83 km^{2} (2.64 sq mi)

Population (June 2025)
  - Total: 2,110
  - Density: 309/km^{2} (800/sq mi)
- Postcode(s): 4818

Bulls (Māori: Pūru) is a town in the Rangitikei District of New Zealand. It is in a fertile farming area at the junction of State Highways 1 and 3, 28 km (17 mi) northwest of Palmerston North. According to a June 2025 Statistics New Zealand estimate, Bulls has a population of 2,110 inhabitants.

Recent marketing makes puns with the name, for example, "New Zealand gets its milk from Bulls" or the sign for the local police station "Const-a-bull".

== Etymology ==
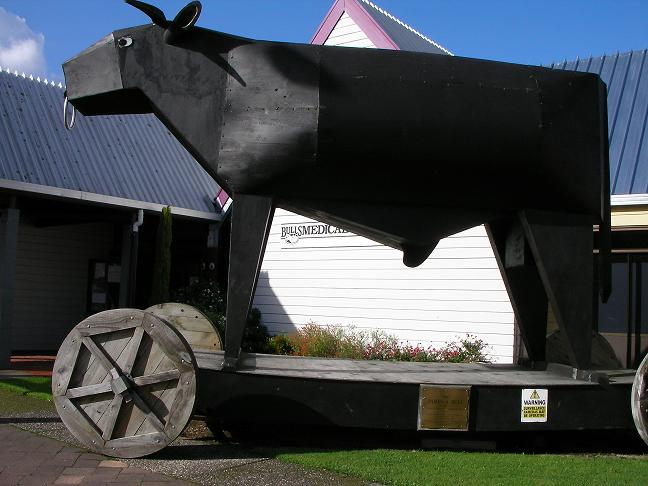
Wooden bull in Bulls

There are two recorded Māori toponyms for the area – Te Ara Taumaihi and Ō-hine-puhiawe. The origins of Te Ara Taumaihi have yet to be explicitly explored. Ō-hine-puhiawe, a land block where Parewahawaha marae is situated, acts as a synecdoche to refer to the current town area. The modern town name is named after James Bull who owned the first general store there. The town was originally called Bull Town, but this was changed to Clifton and then renamed back to Bulls at the urging of Sir William Fox.

== History and culture ==
The eastern end of the State Highway 1 bridge over the Rangitikei River south-east of the town collapsed suddenly in 1973 while being crossed by a bus. No-one was killed and the collapsed part was rebuilt.

The former Lake Alice Psychiatric hospital is 7 km (4 mi) north of Bulls, the hospital closed in 1999. Lake Alice was a large contributor to the Bulls and Marton economy.

Bulls is covered by the Whanganui Chronicle, a daily paper part of the NZ Herald network that serves the Whanganui, Ruapehu and Rangitīkei regions.

Slasher film X was partially filmed in Bulls, namely the interior shots of the farmhouse which were filmed inside the Bulls town hall.

=== Marae ===
The local Parewahawaha Marae is a traditional meeting ground for the Ngāti Raukawa hapū of Ngāti Parewahawaha. It is on land known as Ōhinepuhiawe.

The marae features the Parewahawaha meeting house, a whare tūpana opened on 15 April 1967 by Maori Queen Te Atairangikaahu. At the time it was opened, Te Rangi Pumamao was the rangatira at Parewahawaha. He had finished construction of the house, as previous builders had died.

In October 2020, the Government committed $1,248,067 from the Provincial Growth Fund to upgrade the marae and five others.

== Demographics ==
Stats NZ describes Bulls as a small urban area, which covers 6.83 km^{2} (2.64 sq mi). It had an estimated population of 2,110 as of June 2025, with a population density of 309 people per km^{2}.

Historical population
Year	Pop.	±% p.a.
2006	1,731	—
2013	1,590	−1.21%
2018	1,935	+4.01%
2023	2,055	+1.21%

Bulls had a population of 2,055 in the 2023 New Zealand census, an increase of 120 people (6.2%) since the 2018 census, and an increase of 465 people (29.2%) since the 2013 census. There were 1,056 males, 993 females, and 6 people of other genders in 774 dwellings. 3.8% of people identified as LGBTIQ+. The median age was 32.8 years (compared with 38.1 years nationally). There were 462 people (22.5%) aged under 15 years, 444 (21.6%) aged 15 to 29, 873 (42.5%) aged 30 to 64, and 276 (13.4%) aged 65 or older.

People could identify as more than one ethnicity. The results were 79.7% European (Pākehā); 28.3% Māori; 7.2% Pasifika; 3.9% Asian; 0.1% Middle Eastern, Latin American and African New Zealanders (MELAA); and 4.4% other, which includes people giving their ethnicity as "New Zealander". English was spoken by 97.2%, Māori by 4.5%, Samoan by 3.5%, and other languages by 3.9%. No language could be spoken by 2.0% (e.g. too young to talk). New Zealand Sign Language was known by 0.7%. The percentage of people born overseas was 14.6, compared with 28.8% nationally.

Religious affiliations were 25.0% Christian, 0.7% Hindu, 0.6% Islam, 1.9% Māori religious beliefs, 0.4% Buddhist, 0.3% New Age, 0.1% Jewish, and 1.8% other religions. People who answered that they had no religion were 61.5%, and 8.0% of people did not answer the census question.

Of those at least 15 years old, 198 (12.4%) people had a bachelor's or higher degree, 975 (61.2%) had a post-high school certificate or diploma, and 417 (26.2%) people exclusively held high school qualifications. The median income was $43,600, compared with $41,500 nationally. 90 people (5.6%) earned over $100,000 compared to 12.1% nationally. The employment status of those at least 15 was 909 (57.1%) full-time, 147 (9.2%) part-time, and 57 (3.6%) unemployed.

== Government and politics ==
=== Local government ===
As part of the Rangitikei District, the current Mayor of Rangitikei since 2013 is Andy Watson.

Bulls is the main town in the Southern ward of the Rangitikei District Council, which elects two of the eleven district councillors.

=== National government ===
Bulls, like the rest of the Rangitikei District, is located in the general electorate of Rangitīkei and the Māori electorate of Te Tai Hauāuru. Rangitīkei is a safe National Party seat since the 1938 election except for 1978–1984 when it was held by Bruce Beetham of the Social Credit Party. Since 2023 it has been held by Suze Redmayne

Te Tai Hauāuru is a more unstable seat, having been held by three different parties since 1996, i.e. New Zealand First, Te Pāti Māori and the Labour Party. Since 2023 it has been held by Debbie Ngarewa-Packer of Te Pāti Māori.

== Military presence ==
Many Air Force personnel from RNZAF Base Ohakea live in Bulls. In recent years several defence houses have been sold to civilian buyers which has seen a steady decline of servicemen from the area, but a moderate presence remains nonetheless.

In 2017 it was announced that the Republic of Singapore Air Force was looking at establishing a permanent F-15 fighter jet training base at Ohakea with an estimated presence of 500 Singaporean personnel. Ohakea and surrounding areas such as Bulls and Feilding would see a significant increase in military families and personnel to the area. In December 2018 it was announced that this would no longer go ahead.

In 2018 the incumbent government announced the purchase of four Boeing P-8 Poseidon aircraft for maritime surveillance. This announcement came with the news that the current New Zealand Defence Force unit responsible for maritime surveillance, No. 5 Squadron RNZAF, would be required to move to RNZAF Base Ohakea. This move would see a further increase in the number of service personnel living in the area. RNZAF took delivery of these aircraft in 2023.

== Education ==
Bulls has two co-educational state primary schools for Year 1–8 students.

Bulls School was established in 1867 and is the oldest school in the Rangitikei District; it has a roll of 167 as of July 2026.

Clifton School has a roll of 159. It opened in 1967 at the south end of the town. It replaced Rangikea School at Ohakea, which opened in 1951.

The nearest state secondary school (year 9–13) is Rangitikei College, 16 km (9.9 mi) away in Marton.

== Climate ==
Climate data for Bulls (RNZAF Base Ohakea) (1971–2000)
Month	Jan	Feb	Mar	Apr	May	Jun	Jul	Aug	Sep	Oct	Nov	Dec	Year
Mean daily maximum °C (°F)	22.3 (72.1)	22.7 (72.9)	21.2 (70.2)	18.4 (65.1)	15.4 (59.7)	13.0 (55.4)	12.5 (54.5)	13.3 (55.9)	14.8 (58.6)	16.5 (61.7)	18.4 (65.1)	20.6 (69.1)	17.4 (63.4)
Daily mean °C (°F)	17.8 (64.0)	18.1 (64.6)	16.6 (61.9)	14.1 (57.4)	11.5 (52.7)	9.4 (48.9)	8.7 (47.7)	9.4 (48.9)	11.0 (51.8)	12.7 (54.9)	14.3 (57.7)	16.3 (61.3)	13.3 (56.0)
Mean daily minimum °C (°F)	13.3 (55.9)	13.4 (56.1)	12.1 (53.8)	9.8 (49.6)	7.7 (45.9)	5.7 (42.3)	4.8 (40.6)	5.5 (41.9)	7.3 (45.1)	8.9 (48.0)	10.2 (50.4)	12.0 (53.6)	9.2 (48.6)
Average rainfall mm (inches)	63.9 (2.52)	75.3 (2.96)	77.0 (3.03)	61.8 (2.43)	68.7 (2.70)	77.9 (3.07)	82.3 (3.24)	67.2 (2.65)	63.8 (2.51)	73.5 (2.89)	62.3 (2.45)	90.1 (3.55)	863.8 (34)
Mean monthly sunshine hours	249.8	205.8	179.1	170.4	122.5	84.2	118.7	134.4	140.2	166.8	193.1	234.6	1,999.6
Source: NIWA (rain and sun 1981–2010)

== Sister city ==
The town's sister city is Cowes, England.

== Notable people ==
- Chris Amon, former Formula One driver between 1963–1976
- Travis Banks, professional wrestler
- Ormond Wilson, politician
- Victoria Ransom, entrepreneur
