= Turakina Māori Girls' College =

Coordinates: 40.08002°S 175.35599°E

Location
- Henderson's Line; Marton 4710; New Zealand

Information
- Funding type: State-integrated
- Denomination: Presbyterian
- Ministry of Education Institution no.: 194
- Years offered: 9–13
- Gender: Girls
- Socio-economic decile: 3I

Turakina Māori Girls' College (1905 to 2016) was a Presbyterian boarding school for young Māori women. The school was founded in Turakina, New Zealand, in 1905, by A. G. Hamilton. It was relocated to Marton in 1927, but retained its previous name. The Hamilton Memorial Library of the college was dedicated to its founder in 1939.

At the time Māori girls' colleges such as this one were founded, the New Zealand government had no state colleges for Māori girls, but rather funded the education of girls selected as the best from their village schools at denominational schools such as the one at Turakina. At the colleges, they learned domestic skills with the object of turning them into "good women, good wives and good mothers". In 1931, 45 students were in residence at the school.

The school closed in January 2016, having had financial and other problems over the previous ten years and with the roll dropping from 152 in 2003 to 47 in 2015. The minister Hekia Parata said that the college had several problems, and had received nearly $9 million of taxpayer funding in the last five years.
