= Rangitikei District =

Territorial authority district in Manawatū-Whanganui

- Territorial authority district
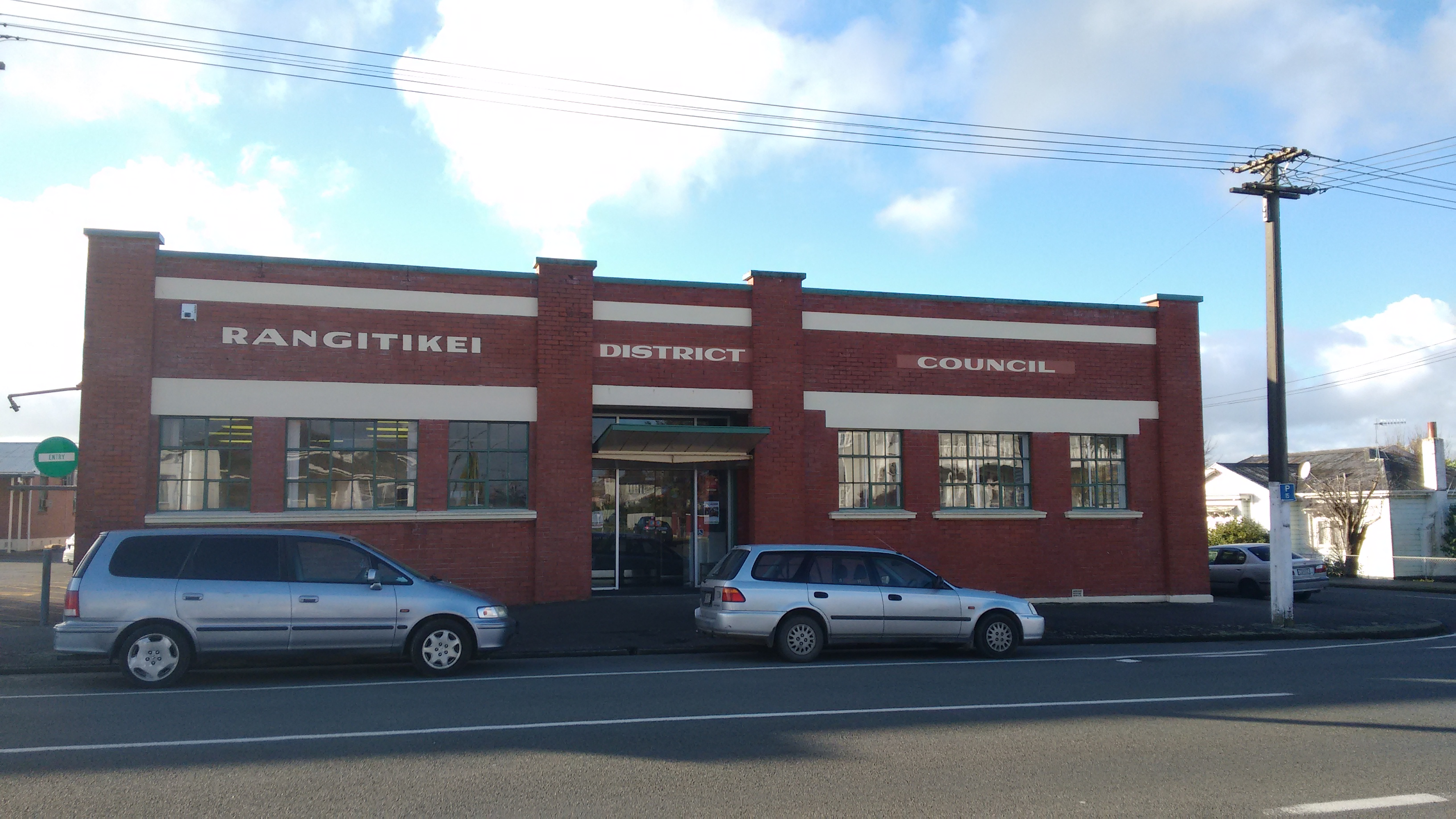
- Rangitikei District Council offices in Marton

- Rangitikei district within the North Island
- Coordinates: 39°47′10″S 175°38′13″E
- Country: New Zealand
- Region: Manawatū-Whanganui
- Wards: Northern; Central; Southern; Tiikeitia ki Uta (Inland)(Māori); Tiikeitia ki Tai (Coastal)(Māori)
- Formed: 1989
- Seat: Marton

Government
  - Mayor: Andy Watson
  - Territorial authority: Rangitikei District Council
  - MPs: Suze Redmayne (National); Debbie Ngarewa-Packer (Te Pāti Māori)

Area
  - Land: 4,483.88 km^{2} (1,731.24 sq mi)

Population (June 2025)
  - Total: 16,000
  - Density: 3.6/km^{2} (9.2/sq mi)
- Time zone: UTC+12 (NZST)
  - Summer (DST): UTC+13 (NZDT)
- Postcode(s): Map of postcodes
- Website: www.rangitikei.govt.nz

The Rangitikei District is a territorial authority district located primarily in the Manawatū-Whanganui region in the North Island of New Zealand, although a small part, the town of Ngamahanga (13.63% by land area), lies in the Hawke's Bay Region. It is located in the southwest of the island, and follows the catchment area of the Rangitīkei River.

The Rangitikei District Council is the local government authority for this district. It is composed of a mayor, currently Andy Watson, and 11 councillors, one of whom is the deputy mayor.

== History ==
The Rangitikei District was established in 1989 as part of the 1989 local government reforms. On 19 December 2024 the Minister for Land Information Chris Penk declined a proposal from the New Zealand Geographic Board to add a macron and change the spelling of Rangitikei District to "Rangitīkei", to match the spelling of the river.

== Government and politics ==
=== Local government ===
The current Mayor of Rangitikei is Andy Watson, elected in 2013 and re-elected in 2016, 2019, and 2022. Watson was first elected in 2013 by obtaining 1,983 votes (41.5%) of the vote and a majority of 486 (10.2%) beating incumbent mayor Chalky Leary.

Rangitikei District Council is served by eleven councillors elected across five wards. Five councillors are elected from the Central ward, two from the Northern ward, two from the Southern ward, with one councillor from the Tiikeitia ki Uta Inland and Coastal Māori Wards.

=== Regional government ===
Rangitikei District is one of nine districts located partially or entirely within the Manawatū-Whanganui region. As such, it is represented on the Manawatū-Whanganui Regional Council, known as Horizons Regional Council. Two of the twelve regional councillors are elected by the district in the Manawatu - Rangitikei ward; the two regional councillors elected in the 2022 elections are Bruce Gordon and Gordon McKellar.

=== National government ===
Rangitikei is located in the general electorate of Rangitīkei and in the Māori electorate of Te Tai Hauāuru. Rangitīkei has been a safe National Party seat since the 1938 election with the exception of 1978–1984 when it was held by Bruce Beetham of the Social Credit Party. Since 2023 it is held by Suze Redmayne.

Te Tai Hauāuru is a more volatile seat, having been held by three different parties since 1996, i.e. New Zealand First, Te Pāti Māori and the Labour Party. Since 2023, it has been held by Debbie Ngarewa-Packer of Te Pāti Māori.

== Geography ==
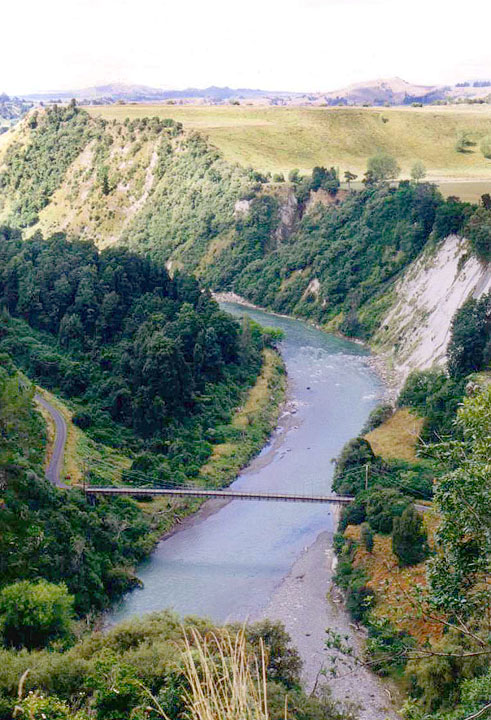
Rangitīkei River at Mangaweka

Located north of Wellington, the district stretches from the South Taranaki Bight toward the North Island Volcanic Plateau, forming a trapezium-shaped block that includes the towns of Taihape, Bulls, Marton, Hunterville, and Mangaweka. The district has a land area of 4,483.88 km².

=== Climate ===
Rangitikei's climate is temperate and has few extremes compared to many parts of New Zealand. According to the Köppen climate classification, this climate is classified as oceanic climate (Cfb). Summers are warm, with average temperatures in the low 20s. The most settled weather occurs in summer and early autumn. Winters are mild near the coast and on the plains; it is colder inland and in the hill country, but often frosty, clear and calm. Snowfall occasionally settles in areas 400 m above sea level, such as Taihape. Annual rainfall is moderate, and annual hours of bright sunshine can average over 2,000.

Climate data for Marton
Month	Jan	Feb	Mar	Apr	May	Jun	Jul	Aug	Sep	Oct	Nov	Dec	Year
Mean daily maximum °C (°F)	22.1 (71.8)	22.5 (72.5)	20.7 (69.3)	18.1 (64.6)	15.1 (59.2)	12.8 (55.0)	12.1 (53.8)	12.9 (55.2)	14.5 (58.1)	16.4 (61.5)	18.3 (64.9)	20.3 (68.5)	17.2 (63.0)
Daily mean °C (°F)	17.4 (63.3)	17.7 (63.9)	16.1 (61.0)	13.7 (56.7)	11.0 (51.8)	8.9 (48.0)	8.2 (46.8)	8.9 (48.0)	10.5 (50.9)	12.3 (54.1)	14.0 (57.2)	15.9 (60.6)	12.9 (55.2)
Mean daily minimum °C (°F)	12.8 (55.0)	12.9 (55.2)	11.6 (52.9)	9.3 (48.7)	7.0 (44.6)	5.1 (41.2)	4.3 (39.7)	4.9 (40.8)	6.6 (43.9)	8.2 (46.8)	9.8 (49.6)	11.6 (52.9)	8.7 (47.7)
Average rainfall mm (inches)	79.7 (3.14)	65.2 (2.57)	80.4 (3.17)	73.0 (2.87)	92.3 (3.63)	98.9 (3.89)	97.2 (3.83)	85.1 (3.35)	80.9 (3.19)	93.2 (3.67)	79.0 (3.11)	92.0 (3.62)	1,016.9 (40.04)
Source 1: Climate-charts.com
Source 2: Climate-data.org

Climate data for Taihape
Month	Jan	Feb	Mar	Apr	May	Jun	Jul	Aug	Sep	Oct	Nov	Dec	Year
Mean daily maximum °C (°F)	21.6 (70.9)	21.8 (71.2)	19.8 (67.6)	16.9 (62.4)	13.7 (56.7)	11.2 (52.2)	10.5 (50.9)	11.4 (52.5)	13.3 (55.9)	15.5 (59.9)	17.6 (63.7)	19.8 (67.6)	16.1 (61.0)
Daily mean °C (°F)	16.4 (61.5)	16.6 (61.9)	14.9 (58.8)	12.2 (54.0)	9.4 (48.9)	7.2 (45.0)	6.4 (43.5)	7.3 (45.1)	9.1 (48.4)	11.0 (51.8)	12.8 (55.0)	14.9 (58.8)	11.5 (52.7)
Mean daily minimum °C (°F)	11.3 (52.3)	11.4 (52.5)	10.1 (50.2)	7.6 (45.7)	5.2 (41.4)	3.3 (37.9)	2.4 (36.3)	3.2 (37.8)	4.9 (40.8)	6.6 (43.9)	8.1 (46.6)	10.0 (50.0)	7.0 (44.6)
Average rainfall mm (inches)	78 (3.1)	59 (2.3)	77 (3.0)	64 (2.5)	88 (3.5)	88 (3.5)	90 (3.5)	78 (3.1)	80 (3.1)	79 (3.1)	72 (2.8)	100 (3.9)	953 (37.5)
Source: Climate-data.org

== Demographics ==
Rangitikei District covers 4,483.88 km^{2} (1,731.24 sq mi) and had an estimated population of 16,000 as of June 2025, with a population density of 3.6 people per km^{2}.

Historical population
Year	Pop.	±% p.a.
1986	17,694	—
1991	16,676	−1.18%
1996	16,531	−0.17%
2001	15,102	−1.79%
2006	14,712	−0.52%
2013	14,019	−0.69%
2018	15,027	+1.40%
2023	15,663	+0.83%

Rangitikei District had a population of 15,663 in the 2023 New Zealand census, an increase of 636 people (4.2%) since the 2018 census, and an increase of 1,644 people (11.7%) since the 2013 census. There were 7,863 males, 7,758 females and 39 people of other genders in 6,159 dwellings. 2.4% of people identified as LGBTIQ+. The median age was 41.1 years (compared with 38.1 years nationally). There were 3,033 people (19.4%) aged under 15 years, 2,655 (17.0%) aged 15 to 29, 6,816 (43.5%) aged 30 to 64, and 3,159 (20.2%) aged 65 or older.

People could identify as more than one ethnicity. The results were 79.6% European (Pākehā); 28.2% Māori; 5.5% Pasifika; 2.9% Asian; 0.5% Middle Eastern, Latin American and African New Zealanders (MELAA); and 3.0% other, which includes people giving their ethnicity as "New Zealander". English was spoken by 96.9%, Māori language by 6.4%, Samoan by 2.3% and other languages by 4.2%. No language could be spoken by 2.1% (e.g. too young to talk). New Zealand Sign Language was known by 0.7%. The percentage of people born overseas was 12.2, compared with 28.8% nationally.

Religious affiliations were 32.6% Christian, 0.3% Hindu, 0.4% Islam, 4.5% Māori religious beliefs, 0.3% Buddhist, 0.5% New Age, 0.1% Jewish, and 0.9% other religions. People who answered that they had no religion were 52.5%, and 8.2% of people did not answer the census question.

Of those at least 15 years old, 1,305 (10.3%) people had a bachelor's or higher degree, 7,431 (58.8%) had a post-high school certificate or diploma, and 3,516 (27.8%) people exclusively held high school qualifications. The median income was $36,600, compared with $41,500 nationally. 801 people (6.3%) earned over $100,000 compared to 12.1% nationally. The employment status of those at least 15 was that 6,330 (50.1%) people were employed full-time, 1,755 (13.9%) were part-time, and 342 (2.7%) were unemployed.

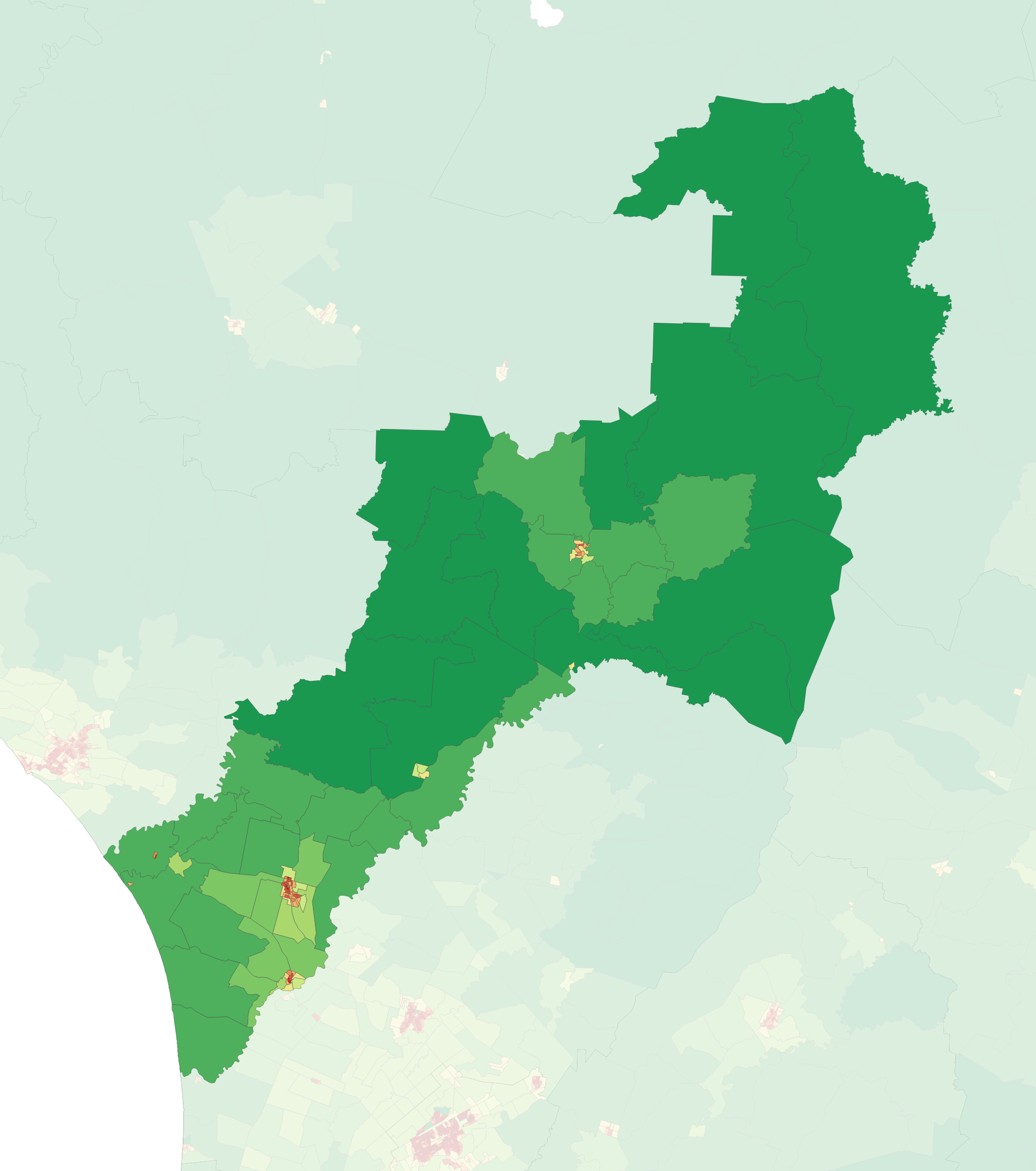
Population density in the 2023 census

Individual wards
Name	Area (km^{2})	Population	Density (per km^{2})	Dwellings	Median age	Median income
Northern General Ward	3,293.43	3,537	1.1	1,470	40.8 years	$38,000
Central General Ward	739.68	8,061	10.9	3,156	43.6 years	$33,900
Southern General Ward	450.77	4,065	9.0	1,533	37.2 years	$41,100
New Zealand					38.1 years	$41,500

== Transport ==
=== Roads ===
State Highway 1 goes through Bulls. The North Island portion of this national state highway, one of only eight in New Zealand, begins at Cape Reinga / Te Rerenga Wairua and ends at Wellington International Airport—passing through Bulls at 925 km.

State Highway 3 passes through Bulls. This highway connects Woodville (25 km east of Palmerston North) and Hamilton via New Plymouth.

State Highway 54 connects Palmerston North and SH 1 at Vinegar Hill via Feilding.

=== Public transport ===
InterCity runs five daily and three non-daily bus services in Marton and Bulls. These include Whanganui–Wellington, Palmerston North–Auckland, Tauranga–Wellington, Wellington–New Plymouth and Auckland–Palmerston North.

Marton used to be serviced by the North Island Main Trunk (or Overlander), a railway line connecting Auckland and Wellington. However, in 2012 the Overlander was replaced by the Northern Explorer, which has fewer stops and does not stop in Marton.

The nearest airports to the district are Whanganui Airport, located 37 km west (of Marton), and Palmerston North Airport, located 44 km southeast. Both airports are domestic only.

== Education ==
Secondary schools

- Rangitikei College, Marton
- Nga Tawa Diocesan School, Marton
- Turakina Maori Girls' College, Marton (until 2015, now closed)
- Taihape Area School, Taihape (years 1–13)

== See also ==
- Parewahawaha Marae
