= 2013 New Zealand local elections =

Local elections in New Zealand

- 12 October 2013
- 77 of 78 councils
Party	Councils	+/–
missing info		
This lists parties that won seats. See the complete results below.
- 67 mayors, ?? local councillors, and ?? regional councillors
Party	Seats	+/–
Mayors
missing info		
Local councillors
missing info		
Regional councillors
missing info		
This lists parties that won seats. See the complete results below.

The 2013 New Zealand local elections (Māori: Nga Pōtitanga ā-Rohe 2013) were triennial elections that were held from 20 September until 12 October 2013 to elect local mayors and councillors, regional councillors, and members of various other local government bodies.

10 of New Zealand's 11 regions and 66 of the 67 cities and districts participated in the election.

== Key dates ==
Key dates for the election as set out by the Electoral Commission are:

1 July 2013	Enrolment drive
4 July 2013	Householders who did not receive their enrolment pack need to take steps to enrol
16 July 2013	Last day for enrolment for postal voting
20 September 2013	Postal voting commences
11 October 2013	Last day to enrol to vote
12 October 2013	Election Day – Voting closes at 12 noon

== Background ==
=== Timing ===
Political commentator Vernon Small thought that the government would likely try and combine the local elections with the asset sales referendum, but this did not happen. Instead, the referendum was held via postal ballot between 22 November and 13 December.

=== Electoral systems ===
The local elections were held using postal ballot. Most city and district councils and all but one regional council used the first-past-the-post (FPP) voting system, with the exception of Dunedin City Council, Kāpiti Coast District Council, Marlborough District Council, Palmerston North City Council, Porirua City Council and Wellington City Council. The Wellington Regional Council was the sole regional council that used the STV system. All District Health Boards used the STV system.

=== Councils under Crown Commission ===
Environment Canterbury and Kaipara District were under statutory management and no elections were held.

== Elections ==
=== Regional councils ===
The regional level of government in New Zealand is organised into areas controlled by regional councils.

=== Territorial authorities ===
The city and district level of government in New Zealand is organised into areas controlled by territorial authorities. Some of these also have the powers of regional governments and are known as unitary authorities. The Chatham Islands have their own specially legislated form of government.

=== Mayors ===
All territorial authorities (including the unitary authorities) directly elected mayors.
