= 2016 New Zealand local elections =

Local elections in New Zealand

- 8 October 2016
- 77 of 78 councils
Party	Councils	+/–
missing info		
This lists parties that won seats. See the complete results below.
- 67 mayors, ?? local councillors, and ?? regional councillors
Party	Seats	+/–
Mayors
missing info		
Local councillors
missing info		
Regional councillors
missing info		
This lists parties that won seats. See the complete results below.

The 2016 New Zealand local elections (Māori: Nga Pōtitanga ā-Rohe 2016) were triennial elections that were held from September until 8 October 2016 to elect local mayors and councillors, regional councillors, and members of various other local government bodies.

10 of New Zealand's 11 regions and all 67 cities and districts participated in the election.

== Background ==
=== Electoral systems ===
The local elections were held using postal ballots. Most city and district councils and all but one regional council used the first-past-the-post (FPP) voting system, with the exception of Dunedin City Council, Kāpiti Coast District Council, Marlborough District Council, Palmerston North City Council, Porirua City Council, and Wellington City Council that use the single transferable vote (STV) voting system. The Wellington Regional Council was the sole regional council to use the STV system.All District Health Boards used the STV system.

=== Councils under Crown Commission ===
Since 2010, Environment Canterbury (ECan) had been under statutory management. For the 2016 local elections, the government allowed seven members of ECan to be elected alongside six commissioners appointed by the government.

Statutory management in Kaipara District ended, and the district held its first elections since 2010.

== Elections ==
=== Regional councils ===
The regional level of government in New Zealand is organised into areas controlled by regional councils.

=== Territorial authorities ===
The city and district level of government in New Zealand is organised into areas controlled by territorial authorities. Some of these also have the powers of regional governments and are known as unitary authorities. The Chatham Islands have their own specially legislated form of government.

=== Mayors ===
All territorial authorities (including the unitary authorities) directly elected mayors.
