= Marton, New Zealand =

Town in Manawatū-Whanganui, New Zealand

Marton
- Town
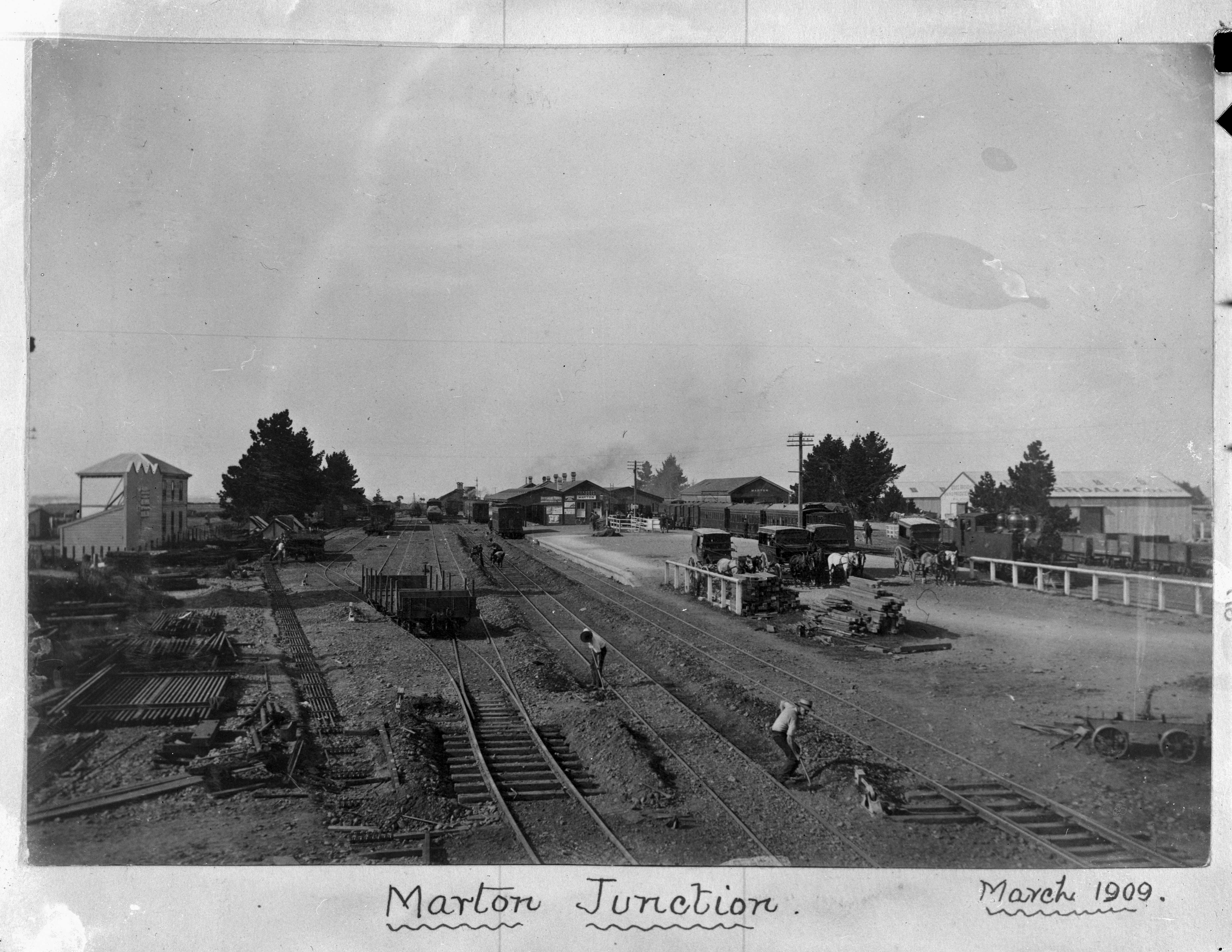
- Marton Junction railway yard and station 1909
- Interactive map of Marton
- Coordinates: 40°04′09″S 175°22′42″E
- Country: New Zealand
- Region: Manawatū-Whanganui
- District: Rangitikei District
- Wards: Central General Ward; Tiikeitia ki Tai (Coastal) Māori Ward
- Named for: Marton, England
- Electorates: Rangitīkei; Te Tai Hauāuru (Māori)

Government
  - Territorial Authority: Rangitikei District Council
  - Regional council: Horizons Regional Council
  - Mayor of Rangitikei: Andy Watson
  - Rangitīkei MP: Suze Redmayne
  - Te Tai Hauāuru MP: Debbie Ngarewa-Packer

Area
  - Total: 10.99 km^{2} (4.24 sq mi)
- Elevation: 152 m (499 ft)

Population (June 2025)
  - Total: 5,730
  - Density: 521/km^{2} (1,350/sq mi)
- Postcode(s): 4710
- Area code: 06

Marton is a town in the Rangitikei district of the Manawatū-Whanganui region of New Zealand's North Island. It is situated 35 kilometres southeast of Whanganui and 40 kilometres northwest of Palmerston North.

Ngāti Apa are tangata whenua for the Marton area.

The town of Marton is the largest in the Rangitikei district, and began life as a private township in 1866, when shop and housing sections were sold at auction by local landowners.

The town had 5,730 residents as of June 2025.

Marton has always been a service town for the fertile farming lands of the lower Rangitikei Rivers flood plains. Butter, wool, and flour have been among its agricultural products. The arrival of the railway in 1878 led to rapid growth in the area, which soon added industries such as engineering, sawmilling, and textile production to its economy.

== History ==
In 1869—due to an unpleasant meaning of the original name—residents voted to change the name of the settlement for the centenary of Captain Cook's voyage to New Zealand. Residents chose Marton, Cook's place of birth, over Cooktown.

From the start Marton was an ideal supply centre for district farmers, who first began arriving in the early 1850s. From butter and wool they moved on to growing wheat in 1863, and big crops led to three flourmills being launched in the area in 1864.

After the town itself opened up in 1866, general stores, two hotels and several blacksmiths soon started. Marton became a home base for the horse industry, with saddlers, wheelwrights, livery stables and coachbuilders competing for business, while Clydesdale and Suffolk Punch sires toured the district to build up the population of plough horses needed as new farms sprang into being.

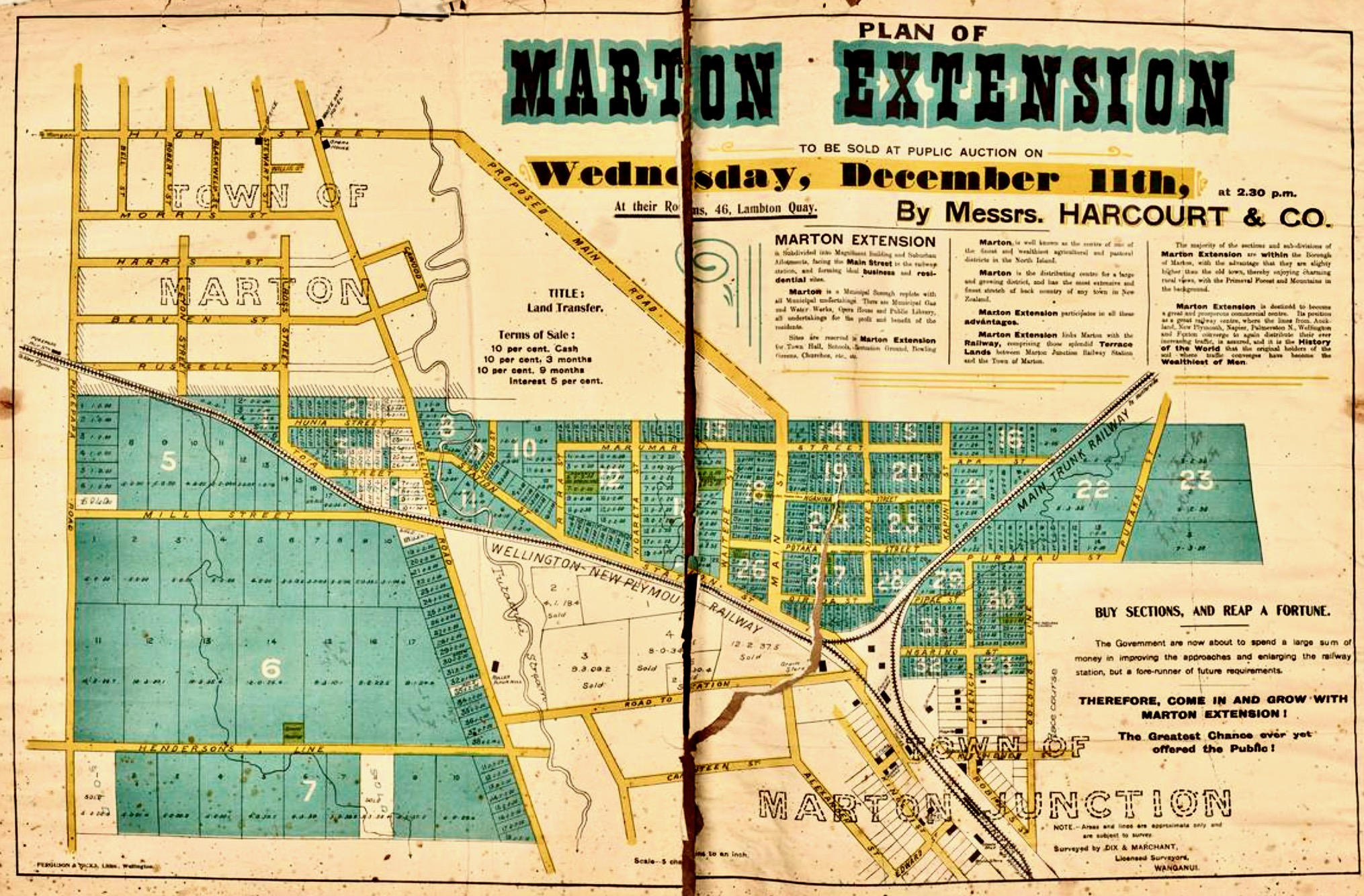
Marton was extended to its new junction station from 1907. The original Pukepapa station is on the far left of the plan, neither being convenient for the original town

The opening of the railway line joining Wanganui to Palmerston North in 1878, now part of the North Island Main Trunk railway (towards Palmerston North and Auckland) and the Marton - New Plymouth Line (towards Wanganui), turned Marton Railway Station into a thriving railway junction, and it held that position for the next 100 years. The move of the railway station in 1898 was followed by a large development of 'Marton Extension', to the south east, from 1907.

Timber from Rangitikei forests served the town's two timbermills, the first from 1889 onwards.

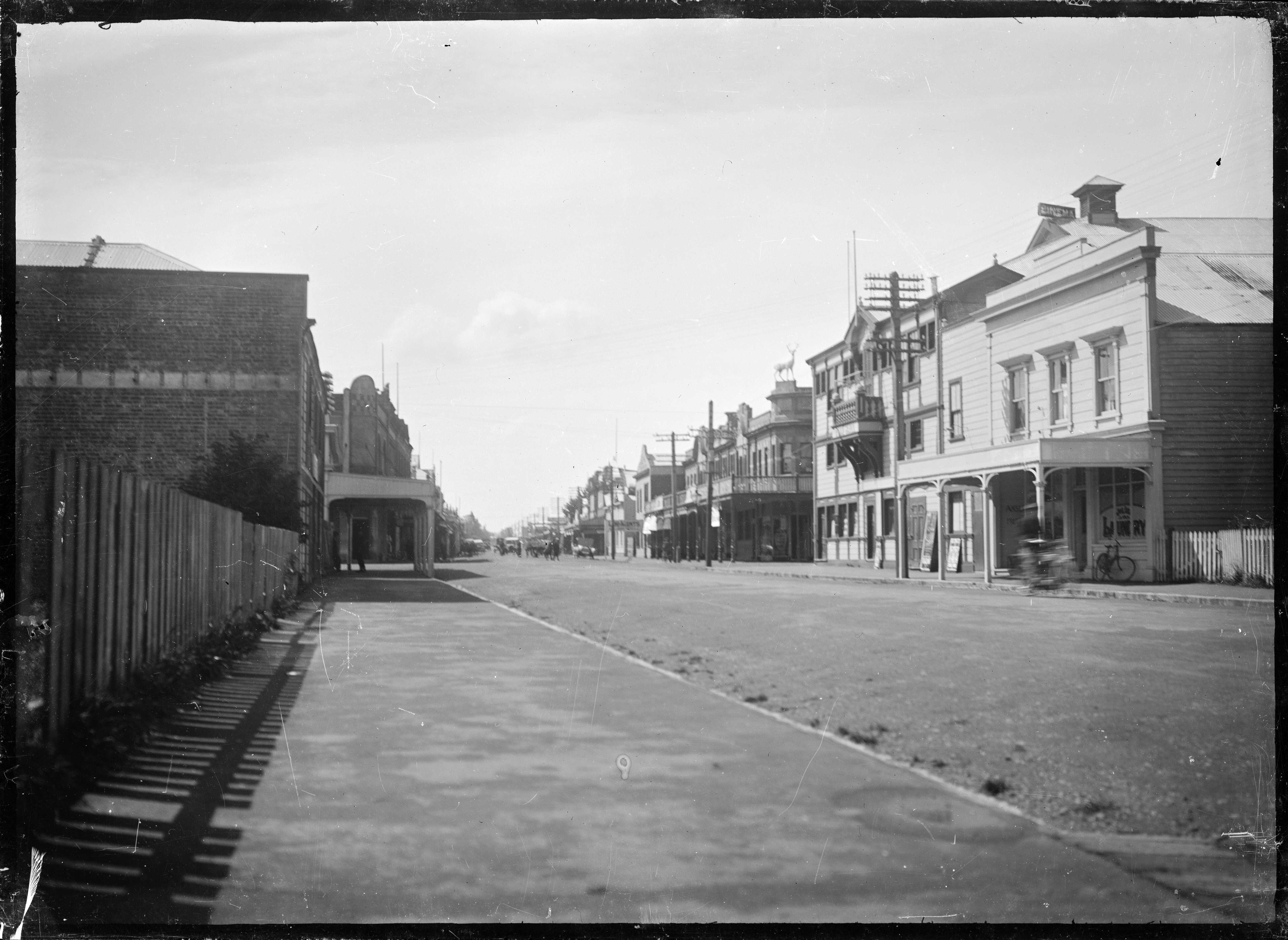
Main Street in Marton circa 1924

Industry developed quietly at first in Marton, starting with flourmilling, brickmaking and wool presses. By the late 1950s there was an incredible array of industries and factories in action. They turned out products as diverse as men's shirts, tractor safety cabs, soft drinks, vegetable salads, readymix concrete, field tiles, dog biscuits, knitwear, dried peas, electronic petrol pumps, vegetable digging machinery.

9 km from Marton was the large Lake Alice Hospital for psychiatric patients, which opened in 1950 and closed in 1999. It included a maximum security unit, and housed hundreds of patients during its 49 years of operation.

=== Newspapers ===
Marton’s first newspaper, the Rangitikei Advocate and Manawatu Argus, was started in 1875, with Alexander McMinn as editor. From 1891 to 1896 there was also the Mercury, published by Francis Arkwright. From 1903 to 1905 the Rangitikei Advocate was associated with the Farmers’ Advocate, a weekly published in Marton that was the official voice of the newly formed New Zealand Farmers’ Union. The Rangitikei Advocate closed on 1 February 1941. The weekly Rangitikei News ran from 1948 to 1955. It was replaced by the Rangitikei Mail. Feilding-Rangitīkei Herald now serves the area.

== Geography ==
=== Climate ===
Marton's climate is temperate and has few extremes compared to many parts of New Zealand. Summers are warm with average temperatures in the low 20s. The most settled weather occurs in summer and early autumn. Winters are mild and annual rainfall is moderate. Annual hours of bright sunshine can average over 2,000.

Climate data for Marton
Month	Jan	Feb	Mar	Apr	May	Jun	Jul	Aug	Sep	Oct	Nov	Dec	Year
Mean daily maximum °C (°F)	22.1 (71.8)	22.5 (72.5)	20.7 (69.3)	18.1 (64.6)	15.1 (59.2)	12.8 (55.0)	12.1 (53.8)	12.9 (55.2)	14.5 (58.1)	16.4 (61.5)	18.3 (64.9)	20.3 (68.5)	17.2 (63.0)
Daily mean °C (°F)	17.4 (63.3)	17.7 (63.9)	16.1 (61.0)	13.7 (56.7)	11.0 (51.8)	8.9 (48.0)	8.2 (46.8)	8.9 (48.0)	10.5 (50.9)	12.3 (54.1)	14.0 (57.2)	15.9 (60.6)	12.9 (55.2)
Mean daily minimum °C (°F)	12.8 (55.0)	12.9 (55.2)	11.6 (52.9)	9.3 (48.7)	7.0 (44.6)	5.1 (41.2)	4.3 (39.7)	4.9 (40.8)	6.6 (43.9)	8.2 (46.8)	9.8 (49.6)	11.6 (52.9)	8.7 (47.7)
Average rainfall mm (inches)	79.7 (3.14)	65.2 (2.57)	80.4 (3.17)	73.0 (2.87)	92.3 (3.63)	98.9 (3.89)	97.2 (3.83)	85.1 (3.35)	80.9 (3.19)	93.2 (3.67)	79.0 (3.11)	92.0 (3.62)	1,016.9 (40.04)
Source 1: Climate-charts.com
Source 2: Climate-data.org

== Demographics ==
Stats NZ describes Marton as a small urban area, which covers 10.99 km^{2} (4.24 sq mi). It had an estimated population of 5,730 as of June 2025, with a population density of 521 people per km^{2}.

Historical population
Year	Pop.	±% p.a.
2006	4,932	—
2013	4,758	−0.51%
2018	5,229	+1.91%
2023	5,598	+1.37%
The 2006 population is for a larger area of 13.59 km^{2}. Source:

Marton had a population of 5,598 in the 2023 New Zealand census, an increase of 369 people (7.1%) since the 2018 census, and an increase of 840 people (17.7%) since the 2013 census. There were 2,718 males, 2,865 females, and 15 people of other genders in 2,196 dwellings. 2.8% of people identified as LGBTIQ+. The median age was 42.6 years (compared with 38.1 years nationally). There were 1,038 people (18.5%) aged under 15 years, 975 (17.4%) aged 15 to 29, 2,241 (40.0%) aged 30 to 64, and 1,341 (24.0%) aged 65 or older.

People could identify as more than one ethnicity. The results were 77.7% European (Pākehā); 25.8% Māori; 8.0% Pasifika; 3.5% Asian; 0.6% Middle Eastern, Latin American and African New Zealanders (MELAA); and 2.6% other, which includes people giving their ethnicity as "New Zealander". English was spoken by 96.7%, Māori by 5.9%, Samoan by 4.4%, and other languages by 5.3%. No language could be spoken by 2.1% (e.g. too young to talk). New Zealand Sign Language was known by 0.9%. The percentage of people born overseas was 15.6, compared with 28.8% nationally.

Religious affiliations were 35.9% Christian, 0.4% Hindu, 0.6% Islam, 3.0% Māori religious beliefs, 0.3% Buddhist, 0.6% New Age, 0.1% Jewish, and 1.1% other religions. People who answered that they had no religion were 49.6%, and 8.5% of people did not answer the census question.

Of those at least 15 years old, 537 (11.8%) people had a bachelor's or higher degree, 2,640 (57.9%) had a post-high school certificate or diploma, and 1,386 (30.4%) people exclusively held high school qualifications. The median income was $32,600, compared with $41,500 nationally. 195 people (4.3%) earned over $100,000 compared to 12.1% nationally. The employment status of those at least 15 was 2,028 (44.5%) full-time, 564 (12.4%) part-time, and 144 (3.2%) unemployed.

Individual statistical areas
Name	Area (km^{2})	Population	Density (per km^{2})	Dwellings	Median age	Median income
Marton North	6.13	3,183	519	1,332	48.8 years	$32,500
Marton South	4.86	2,412	496	864	35.8 years	$32,800
New Zealand					38.1 years	$41,500

=== Rural surrounds ===
Marton Rural covers 194.35 km^{2} (75.04 sq mi) and had an estimated population of 1,100 as of June 2025, with a population density of 5.7 people per km^{2}.

Historical population for Marton Rural
Year	Pop.	±% p.a.
2006	924	—
2013	999	+1.12%
2018	1,029	+0.59%
2023	1,095	+1.25%
The 2006 population is for a smaller area of 192.56 km^{2}. Source:

Marton Rural had a population of 1,095 in the 2023 New Zealand census, an increase of 66 people (6.4%) since the 2018 census, and an increase of 96 people (9.6%) since the 2013 census. There were 567 males, 525 females, and 6 people of other genders in 402 dwellings. 1.9% of people identified as LGBTIQ+. The median age was 45.1 years (compared with 38.1 years nationally). There were 210 people (19.2%) aged under 15 years, 141 (12.9%) aged 15 to 29, 507 (46.3%) aged 30 to 64, and 234 (21.4%) aged 65 or older.

People could identify as more than one ethnicity. The results were 90.7% European (Pākehā), 12.1% Māori, 4.9% Pasifika, 1.4% Asian, and 3.8% other, which includes people giving their ethnicity as "New Zealander". English was spoken by 96.2%, Māori by 2.5%, Samoan by 0.8%, and other languages by 4.4%. No language could be spoken by 2.5% (e.g. too young to talk). New Zealand Sign Language was known by 0.3%. The percentage of people born overseas was 10.1, compared with 28.8% nationally.

Religious affiliations were 37.5% Christian, 0.3% Hindu, 0.8% Māori religious beliefs, 0.3% Buddhist, 0.3% New Age, and 1.1% other religions. People who answered that they had no religion were 52.3%, and 7.9% of people did not answer the census question.

Of those at least 15 years old, 165 (18.6%) people had a bachelor's or higher degree, 531 (60.0%) had a post-high school certificate or diploma, and 195 (22.0%) people exclusively held high school qualifications. The median income was $39,900, compared with $41,500 nationally. 111 people (12.5%) earned over $100,000 compared to 12.1% nationally. The employment status of those at least 15 was 450 (50.8%) full-time, 147 (16.6%) part-time, and 15 (1.7%) unemployed.

== Government and politics ==
=== Local government ===
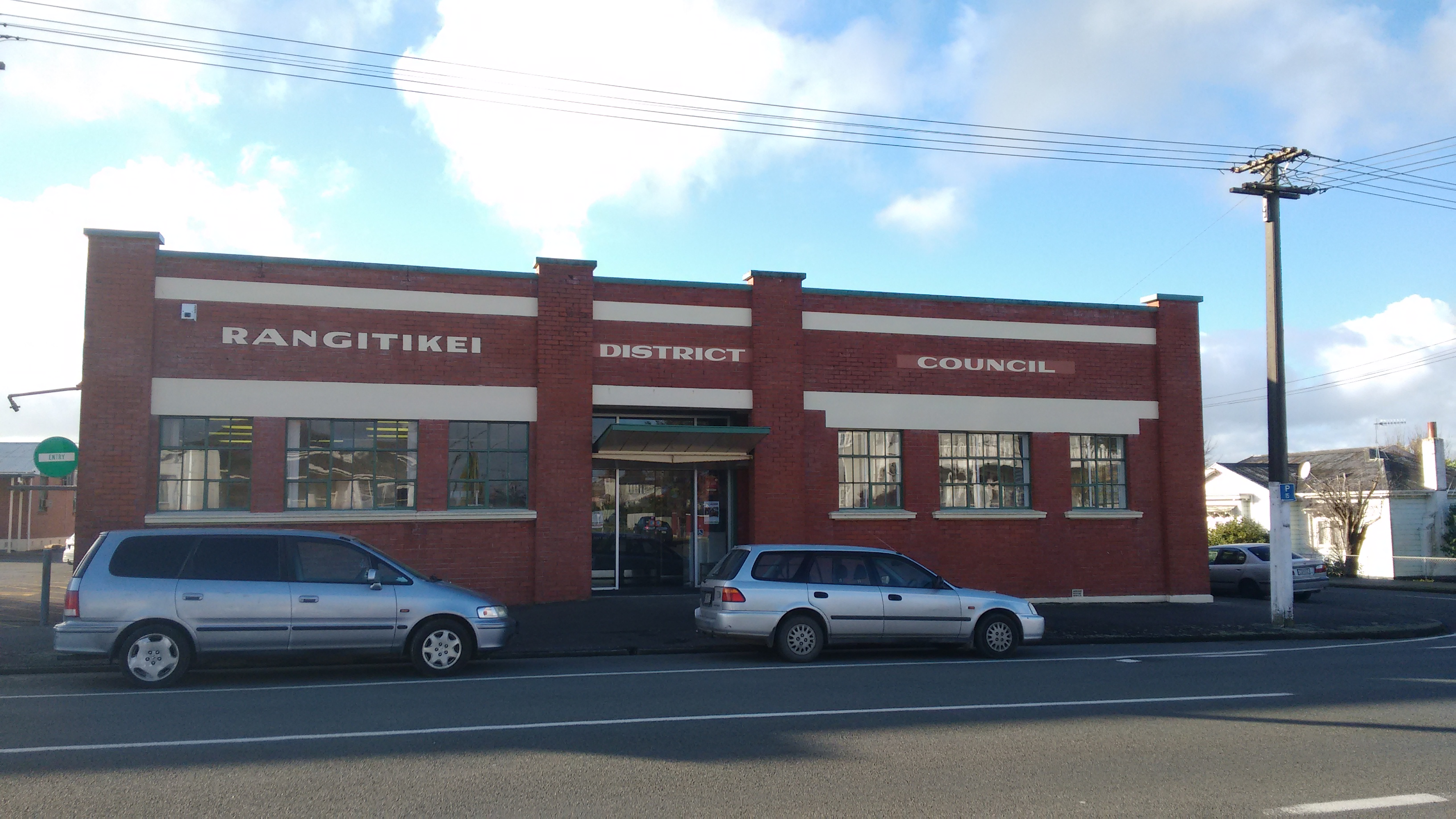
Rangitikei District Council offices on 46 High Street, Marton.

The current Mayor of the Rangitikei District is Andy Watson.

=== National government ===
Marton is located in the general electorate of Rangitīkei and in the Māori electorate of Te Tai Hauāuru. Rangitīkei is a safe National Party seat since the 1938 election with the exception of 1978–1984 when it was held by Bruce Beetham of the Social Credit Party. Since 2023 it is held by Suze Redmayne.

Te Tai Hauāuru is a more volatile seat, having been held by three different parties since 1996, i.e. New Zealand First, Te Pāti Māori and the Labour Party. Since 2023 it is held by Debbie Ngarewa-Packer of Te Pāti Māori.

== Culture ==
=== Sports ===
Marton has four sports clubs: Marton Cricket Club, Marton Rugby and Sports Club, Marton Bears Rugby League Club and Marton United AFC.

== Transport ==
State Highway 1 passes 4 km (2 mi) east of Marton, while State Highway 3 passes 7 km (4 mi) to the south.

The nearest airports to the town are Whanganui Airport, located 37 km west, and Palmerston North Airport, located 44 km southeast. Both airports are domestic only.

Marton is on the North Island Main Trunk Line; and on the Marton-New Plymouth Line which leaves the NIMT at Marton. However although the Overlander on the NIMT used to stop at Marton railway station, the replacement Northern Explorer introduced in 2012 has fewer stops and does not stop at Marton.

== Education ==
Marton has four co-educational state primary schools for Year 1 to 8 students: Marton School, established 1866, with a roll of 202; Marton Junction School, established 1923, with a roll of 89; James Cook School, established 1970, with a roll of 145; and South Makirikiri School, established by 1873, with a roll of 149.

There are also two other primary schools. St Matthew's School is a state-integrated Catholic primary school, established 1915, with a roll of 55. Huntley School is a private boarding school, established 1896, with a roll of 164.

Rangitīkei College is a co-educational state secondary school, with a roll of 328. It was established in 1958 to replace the district high schools in Rangitikei District, including Marton District High School, which began in 1901 from Marton School.

Nga Tawa Diocesan School is a state-integrated girls' boarding school for Year 9 to 13 students, with a roll of 198. It was established in 1891.

Rolls are as of July 2026.

Until 2016 there was a third secondary school, Turakina Māori Girls' College.

== Notable people ==
- Francis Arkwright, politician
- Bruce Beetham, Social Credit politician
- Iris Crooke, nurse, Florence Nightingale Medal, Volunteer
- Israel Dagg, All Black
- Sir Michael Fowler, architect, Mayor of Wellington
- James Laurenson, actor
- Kaleb Ngatoa, motor racing driver
- Launcelot Eric Richdale, ornithologist
- Norman Shelton, National MP

== See also ==
- List of schools in Manawatū-Whanganui
- Mayor of Rangitikei
- 2013 Rangitikei local elections
