= Soraya Peke-Mason =

New Zealand politician

Soraya Peke-Mason JP
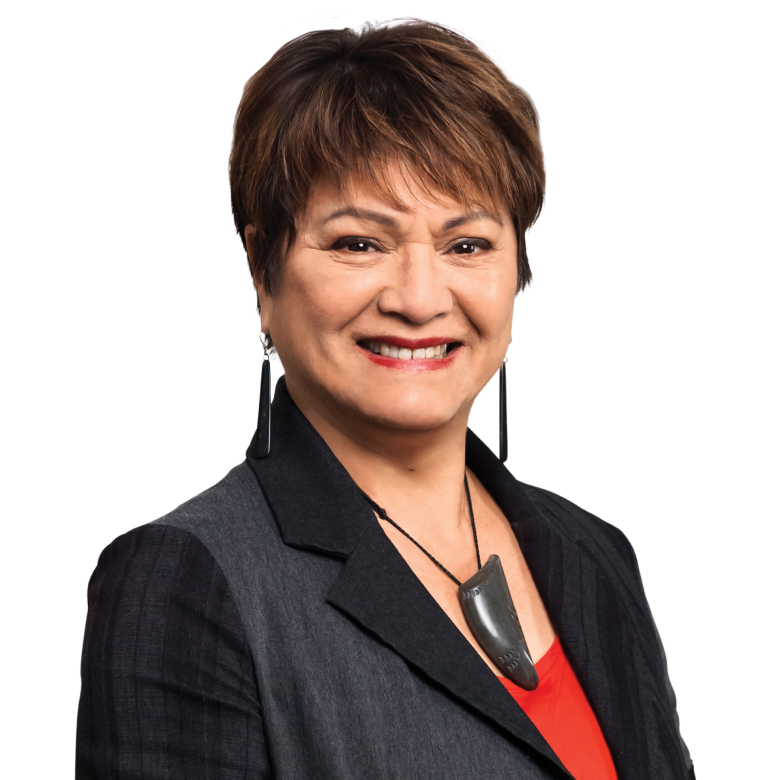
- Peke-Mason in 2023

Member of the New Zealand Parliament for Labour party list
- In office 25 October 2022 – 14 October 2023
- Preceded by: Trevor Mallard

Rangitikei District Councillor for the Turakina ward
- In office 13 October 2007 – 12 October 2019
- Preceded by: Ward established
- Succeeded by: Ward abolished

Personal details
- Born: 1957 or 1958 (age 67–68) Tokoroa, New Zealand
- Party: Labour
- Education: Massey University

Soraya Waiata Peke-Mason (born 1957 or 1958) is a New Zealand politician. She was a Member of Parliament in the House of Representatives for the Labour Party from 2022 to 2023.

== Early life and career ==
Peke-Mason was born in Tokoroa and grew up in Castlecliff. She has ancestry that can be traced back to the early 1800s in Rangitīkei.

She attended Castlecliff Primary, Rutherford Intermediate, and Whanganui High School. She is self-employed and with a business background in the construction, tourism, forestry and honey industries. She lives in Rātana, and has tribal affiliations to Ngāti Apa, Ngāti Rangi, Ngāti Tūwharetoa, and Tainui. She has been a justice of the peace for over 30 years and has a master's degree in business administration from Massey University.

== Local government ==
From 2001 to 2007 Peke-Mason was a member of the Rātana Community Board. Her time on the community board was focused on access to clean water for the town, an ambition culminating in 2016 with the opening of a new water treatment plant in the area.

Peke-Mason was a member of the Rangitīkei District Council for 12 years. She became the council's first Māori woman councillor at the 2007 New Zealand local elections, being elected as councillor for the newly created Turakina ward. She represented Turakina around the council table for the ward's entire existence, with the ward being abolished ahead of the 2019 local elections. That year, Peke-Mason stood unsuccessfully for a spot on the Horizons Regional Council.

She unsuccessfully contested the Raki Māori constituency of Horizons Regional Council in the 2025 New Zealand local elections.

== Te Tōtarahoe o Paerangi ==
In 2019 Peke-Mason was chair of the Ngāti Rangi post-settlement entity, Te Tōtarahoe o Paerangi.

== Member of Parliament ==
New Zealand Parliament
| Years | Term | Electorate | List | Party |
|---|---|---|---|---|
| 2022–2023 | 53rd | List | 60 | Labour |

In the 2011 election she stood as the Labour candidate in the electorate of Te Tai Hauāuru. She came second to Tariana Turia.

In March 2020 Peke-Mason was selected as the Labour candidate for the Rangitīkei electorate. She was unopposed for the nomination after Heather Warren, Labour's candidate from 2017, withdrew. She was unsuccessful in the Rangitīkei seat, but entered Parliament off the Labour list when Trevor Mallard resigned. Upon her swearing-in on 25 October 2022, women held a majority of seats in Parliament for the first time.

During the 2023 New Zealand general election, Peke-Mason stood as the Labour candidate in the Māori electorate of Te Tai Hauāuru. She was defeated by the candidate for Te Pāti Māori, list MP Debbie Ngarewa-Packer, by a margin of 9,162 votes.

== Personal life ==
She is a member of the Ratana Church. Her cousin is former Speaker of the New Zealand House of Representatives Adrian Rurawhe.
