= Andy Watson (mayor) =

New Zealand politician

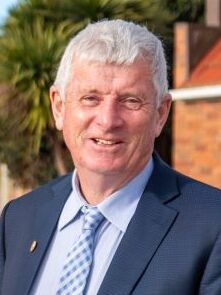
- Watson in 2025

Mayor of Rangitikei
- Incumbent
- Assumed office 12 October 2013
- Deputy: Dean McManaway
- Preceded by: Chalky Leary
- Majority: 2,938 (62.47%) (2016)

Personal details
- Spouse: Beth
- Occupation: Businessman

Andrew Geoffrey Watson is the Mayor of Rangitikei District in Manawatū-Whanganui, New Zealand. He was elected as Mayor of Rangitikei on 12 October 2013, defeating incumbent mayor Chalky Leary. Watson was re-elected in 2016, 2019, and 2022.

== Political career ==
Watson began his political career as a councillor for the Marton ward of the Rangitikei District Council in the 2004 local elections. As a councillor he was chosen as Deputy Mayor by Mayor Bob Buchanan. He served in this role for two terms.

With mayor Buchanan departing, in 2007 Watson challenged for the mayoralty with the other contenders being Chalky Leary, Marilyn Craig, Nick Eddy and three others. Watson came in second place as Leary was elected receiving 1,639 votes or 31.0% of the votes with a majority of 233 votes or 4.4% over Watson. Watson did not challenge for the mayoralty in 2010 and Leary was elected unopposed.

In 2013 Leary was seeking a third term but his mayoralty was challenged for the first time. Watson entered the race, as well as Fresh Future Focus candidate Maree Brannigan and Taihape ward councillor Richard Aslett. Watson was elected by obtaining 1,983 votes (41.5%) of the total votes and a majority of 486 (10.2%) defeating incumbent mayor Chalky Leary, who received 1,497 votes. As Watson was elected mayor he did not take up his role as Marton ward councillor which went on to the next candidate with the most votes, resulting in the election of Mike Jones. After his election Watson said he was expecting to work closely with Palmerston North mayor Jono Naylor and Wanganui mayor Annette Main.

In May 2015 Meridian Energy's wind farm Project Central Wind was granted a five-year consent extension by the Rangitikei District Council led by Watson. This project is a planned 55-turbine farm that would generate electricity for 50,000 New Zealand homes each year.

In September 2015 Watson, along with Palmerston North mayor Grant Smith, travelled to Melbourne in an attempt to attract Chinese investment to the district. The two mayors attended the Australasian China Cities business forum in order to attract investment for large-scale assets for local businesses.

On 9 June 2016 he announced his intention to seek a second term as Mayor of Rangitikei. He won the mayoral election, which took place on 8 October, with a substantial majority.

Watson was re-elected as mayor in October 2016, defeating challengers Robert Snijders and George London. Watson received 3,638 votes, 2,938 votes more than his nearest opponent Snijders. He appointed Nigel Belsham as deputy mayor for his second term in office.

He was re-elected unopposed in 2019.

== Life outside politics ==
Watson is a businessman and is married. He is from Marton. He is also the creator of Spookers theme park where he played a role as Old Man Joe.

== See also ==
- Mayor of Rangitikei
- Rangitikei District Council
- 2013 Rangitikei mayoral election
- 2013 Rangitikei local elections

Political offices
Preceded by Chalky Leary	Mayor of Rangitikei; 2013–present	Incumbent
