= Taihape =

Town in Manawatū-Whanganui, New Zealand

- Minor urban area
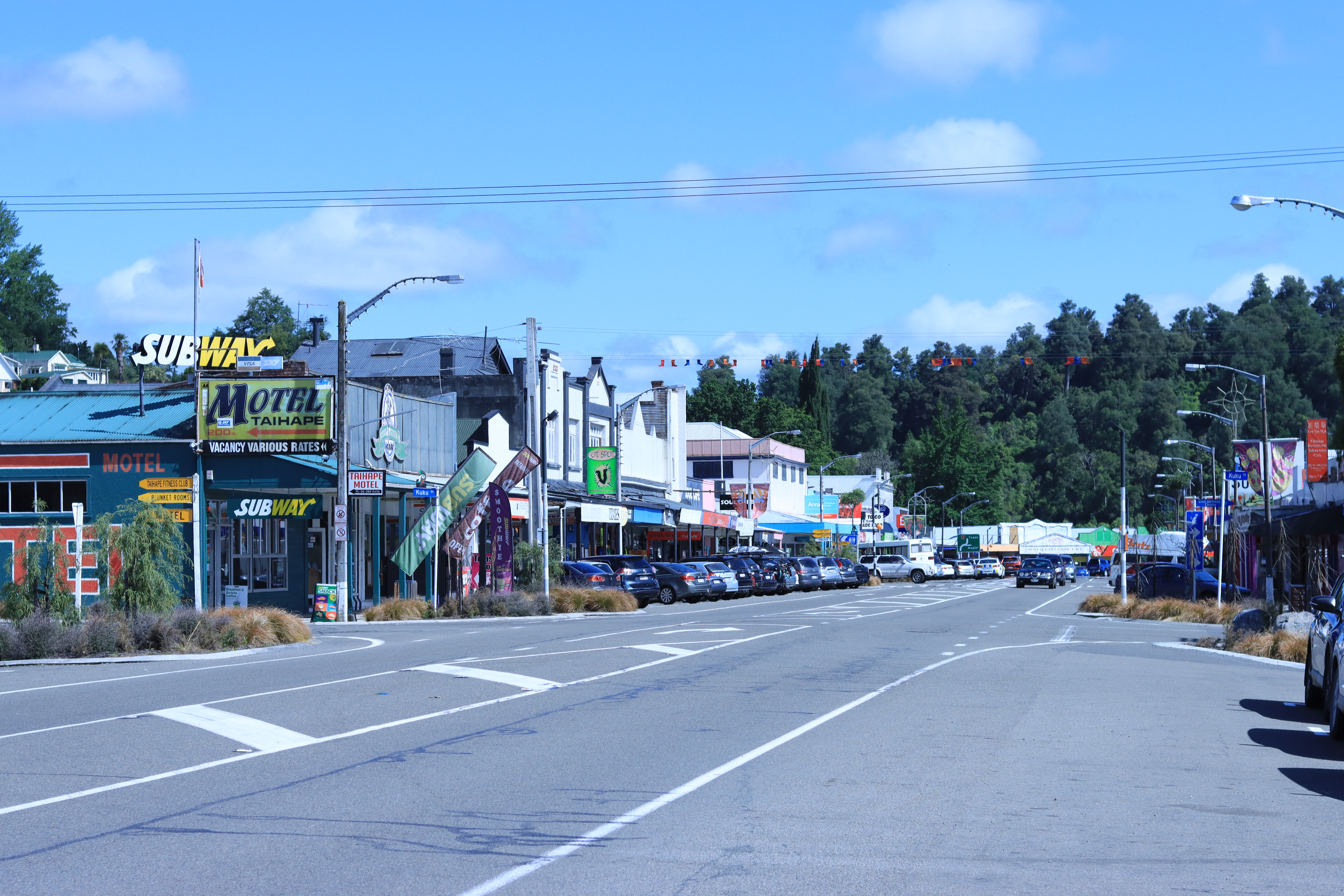
- Interactive map of Taihape
- Coordinates: 39°40.6′S 175°47.8′E
- Country: New Zealand
- Region: Manawatū-Whanganui
- District: Rangitikei District
- Wards: Northern General Ward; Tiikeitia ki Uta (Inland) Māori Ward
- Community: Taihape Community
- Early settlement: pre-European
- Taihape: 1894
- Named for: Shortened form of Ōtaihape.
- Electorates: Rangitīkei; Te Tai Hauāuru (Māori)

Government
  - Territorial Authority: Rangitikei District Council
  - Regional council: Horizons Regional Council
  - Mayor of Rangitikei: Andy Watson
  - Rangitīkei MP: Suze Redmayne
  - Te Tai Hauāuru MP: Debbie Ngarewa-Packer

Area
  - Total: 4.93 km^{2} (1.90 sq mi)

Population (June 2025)
  - Total: 1,720
  - Density: 349/km^{2} (904/sq mi)
- Postcode: 4720
- Area code: 06

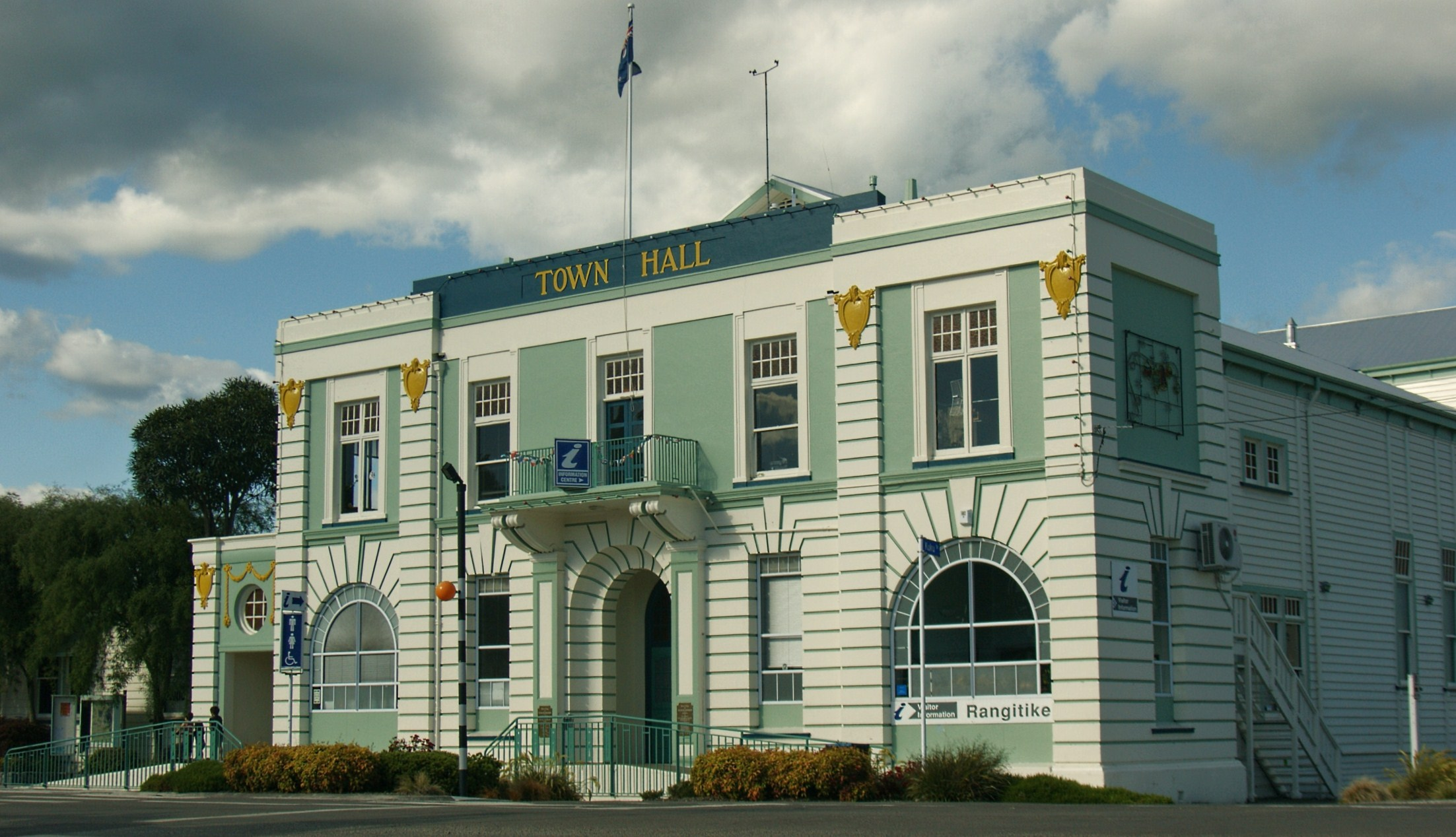
Town hall

Taihape is in the Rangitikei District of the North Island of New Zealand. It serves a large rural community. State Highway 1, which runs North to South through the centre of the North Island, passes through the town.

== History and culture ==
=== Early history ===
The Taihape region was originally inhabited by Māori. These iwi (tribes) still live in the area. The first record of a European to the region is William Colenso's visit in 1845. In 1884, the surveyor's party for the Main Trunk railway line cut a rough track through the district.

The town was founded in 1894, when European settlers arrived from Canterbury in the South Island. The site of the town was a small natural clearing in dense native bush, which the first settlers set about clearing. Many of the original families have descendants still living in the area. The settlement was first called Hautapu after the local river, then Otaihape ("the place of Tai the Hunchback"), and finally Taihape.

Before the establishment of the railway, the bulk of farming produce (wool) had to be transported east by horse and bullock cart to Napier, from where it was exported. Until the establishment of roads and railways in the early 1900s, Taihape, like other rural towns, remained largely an isolated pioneer settlement.

=== Recent history ===
Taihape developed as a key railway and transport town, reaching its peak of population and activity during the heyday of the 1950s and 1960s. The town declined during the downturn of the 1980s and today it is largely a refreshment stop for travellers and a service point for the local farming community.

Taihape is home of the annual Gumboot Day, first celebrated on 9 April 1985. This festival was devised by local business people who decided to capitalise on its rural image. Taihape's association with gumboots is marked by a large sculpture of a gumboot positioned prominently on the edge of town. Local business owners commissioned the New Zealand sculptor Jeff Thomson to produce the oversized gumboot using his signature material, corrugated iron. Entertainer John Clarke used Taihape as a location for his Fred Dagg comedy persona.

=== Marae ===
There are five marae in the Taihape area, where local iwi and hapū meet:

- Kuratahi Marae and Te Karere meeting house is affiliated with the Ngāti Rangi hapū of Ngāti Rangituhia and Ngāti Parenga
- Opaea Marae and Tumakaurangi meeting house is affiliated with the Ngāti Tūwharetoa hapū of Ngāti Tamakōpiri
- Raketapauma Marae and Rangituhia meeting house is affiliated with the Ngāti Rangi hapū of Ngāti Rangituhia
- Tamakopiri Marae and Tumakaurangi meeting house is affiliated with the Ngāti Kahungunu hapū of Ngāti Tama
- Winiata Marae, with its meeting house named Tautahi, is the tūrangawaewae of Ngāti Hinemanu (wife of Tautahi) and its hapū, Ngāti Paki

In October 2020, the Government committed $836,930 from the Provincial Growth Fund to upgrade a cluster of 7 marae, including Opaea Marae and Raketapauma Marae, creating 95 jobs. It also committed a further $239,367 towards Raketapauma Marae and another marae, creating 34 jobs.

== Economy ==
Taihape is a rural supply town and at its peak during the 1960s, was the main railway and transport hub for the surrounding farming community. Much of its economic activity revolved around the railway and rural communities. A major decline occurred in the 1980s due to a restructure and electrification of the railway system and a general downturn in the farming sector.

In recent years and with the advent of major tourist attractions, Taihape is now experiencing an upturn in local commerce. Its location on the North Island Main Trunk railway and on State Highway 1 has ensured its economic survival. Taihape markets itself as the "Gumboot Capital of the World", and it attracts large numbers of people to the annual gumboot-throwing contest.

== Geography ==
Taihape is near the confluence of the Hautapu and Rangitikei rivers about 500 m (1500 ft) above sea level. It lies in a sheltered valley among the high country of the central North Island, close to the Rangitikei River and the Ruahine Ranges. It is surrounded by fertile high country ideal for sheep and deer farming and its location close to the mountains, rivers and lakes has made it an important service hub for hunting and outdoor tourism. The town is located at the southern edge of the volcanic plateau.

Transport routes in and out of Taihape have improved over the years, the roads through the high country are now easy and fast deviations through the hills to Mangaweka in the south and Waiouru to the north.

=== Climate ===
Taihape's climate is temperate, with mild summers and frosty winters, with an average of 31 days exceeding 25 °C (77 °F) and 45 nights dropping below 0 °C (32 °F) every year. There is significant rainfall throughout the year in Taihape. According to the Köppen climate classification, this climate is classified as oceanic climate (Cfb). The average annual temperature is 11.5 °C and about 953 mm of precipitation falls annually.

Climate data for Taihape, elevation 433 m (1,421 ft), (1991–2020 normals, extremes 1911–present)
Month	Jan	Feb	Mar	Apr	May	Jun	Jul	Aug	Sep	Oct	Nov	Dec	Year
Record high °C (°F)	33.5 (92.3)	33.0 (91.4)	30.3 (86.5)	26.0 (78.8)	23.0 (73.4)	24.1 (75.4)	19.6 (67.3)	21.5 (70.7)	24.0 (75.2)	25.0 (77.0)	30.0 (86.0)	30.0 (86.0)	33.5 (92.3)
Mean maximum °C (°F)	28.6 (83.5)	28.6 (83.5)	26.6 (79.9)	23.1 (73.6)	19.8 (67.6)	17.1 (62.8)	16.1 (61.0)	16.5 (61.7)	19.1 (66.4)	21.6 (70.9)	24.4 (75.9)	26.5 (79.7)	29.7 (85.5)
Mean daily maximum °C (°F)	23.4 (74.1)	23.7 (74.7)	21.2 (70.2)	17.6 (63.7)	14.6 (58.3)	11.9 (53.4)	11.3 (52.3)	12.2 (54.0)	14.2 (57.6)	16.2 (61.2)	18.6 (65.5)	21.3 (70.3)	17.2 (62.9)
Daily mean °C (°F)	16.9 (62.4)	17.0 (62.6)	14.7 (58.5)	11.6 (52.9)	9.1 (48.4)	7.0 (44.6)	6.4 (43.5)	7.1 (44.8)	9.1 (48.4)	11.0 (51.8)	12.9 (55.2)	15.5 (59.9)	11.5 (52.8)
Mean daily minimum °C (°F)	10.4 (50.7)	10.3 (50.5)	8.1 (46.6)	5.7 (42.3)	3.6 (38.5)	2.1 (35.8)	1.4 (34.5)	2.1 (35.8)	4.0 (39.2)	5.7 (42.3)	7.1 (44.8)	9.7 (49.5)	5.9 (42.5)
Mean minimum °C (°F)	3.3 (37.9)	3.4 (38.1)	1.3 (34.3)	−1.1 (30.0)	−2.6 (27.3)	−4.1 (24.6)	−4.8 (23.4)	−3.5 (25.7)	−2.6 (27.3)	−0.8 (30.6)	0.2 (32.4)	2.9 (37.2)	−5.3 (22.5)
Record low °C (°F)	−0.1 (31.8)	−1.3 (29.7)	−2.8 (27.0)	−5.1 (22.8)	−6.7 (19.9)	−7.5 (18.5)	−9.1 (15.6)	−6.1 (21.0)	−5.0 (23.0)	−5.1 (22.8)	−2.2 (28.0)	−1.3 (29.7)	−9.1 (15.6)
Average rainfall mm (inches)	68.4 (2.69)	54.5 (2.15)	55.3 (2.18)	92.2 (3.63)	75.9 (2.99)	88.0 (3.46)	92.0 (3.62)	85.5 (3.37)	84.7 (3.33)	92.5 (3.64)	77.3 (3.04)	81.4 (3.20)	947.7 (37.3)
Source: NIWA

== Demographics ==
Stats NZ describes Taihape as a small urban area which covers 4.93 km^{2} (1.90 sq mi). It had an estimated population of 1,720 as of June 2025, with a population density of 349 people per km^{2}. Population peaked at around 3,500 in the late 1960s, but declined in parallel with many other rural towns after that time.

Historical population
Year	Pop.	±% p.a.
2006	1,839	—
2013	1,575	−2.19%
2018	1,716	+1.73%
2023	1,668	−0.57%

Taihape had a population of 1,668 in the 2023 New Zealand census, a decrease of 48 people (−2.8%) since the 2018 census, and an increase of 93 people (5.9%) since the 2013 census. There were 831 males, 837 females, and 3 people of other genders in 717 dwellings. 2.0% of people identified as LGBTIQ+. The median age was 41.6 years (compared with 38.1 years nationally). There were 342 people (20.5%) aged under 15 years, 258 (15.5%) aged 15 to 29, 702 (42.1%) aged 30 to 64, and 366 (21.9%) aged 65 or older.

People could identify as more than one ethnicity. The results were 71.8% European (Pākehā); 49.5% Māori; 5.2% Pasifika; 4.7% Asian; 0.5% Middle Eastern, Latin American and African New Zealanders (MELAA); and 2.0% other, which includes people giving their ethnicity as "New Zealander". English was spoken by 97.1%, Māori by 10.3%, Samoan by 0.5%, and other languages by 3.8%. No language could be spoken by 2.3% (e.g. too young to talk). New Zealand Sign Language was known by 1.3%. The percentage of people born overseas was 9.7, compared with 28.8% nationally.

Religious affiliations were 32.7% Christian, 0.4% Hindu, 0.2% Islam, 5.4% Māori religious beliefs, 0.5% Buddhist, 0.4% New Age, and 1.1% other religions. People who answered that they had no religion were 50.7%, and 9.0% of people did not answer the census question.

Of those at least 15 years old, 135 (10.2%) people had a bachelor's or higher degree, 756 (57.0%) had a post-high school certificate or diploma, and 441 (33.3%) people exclusively held high school qualifications. The median income was $34,400, compared with $41,500 nationally. 66 people (5.0%) earned over $100,000 compared to 12.1% nationally. The employment status of those at least 15 was 630 (47.5%) full-time, 198 (14.9%) part-time, and 33 (2.5%) unemployed.

== Railways ==
Taihape Railway Station was an important railway stop on the North Island Main Trunk line, with a marshalling yard and locomotive depot until the late 1970s.

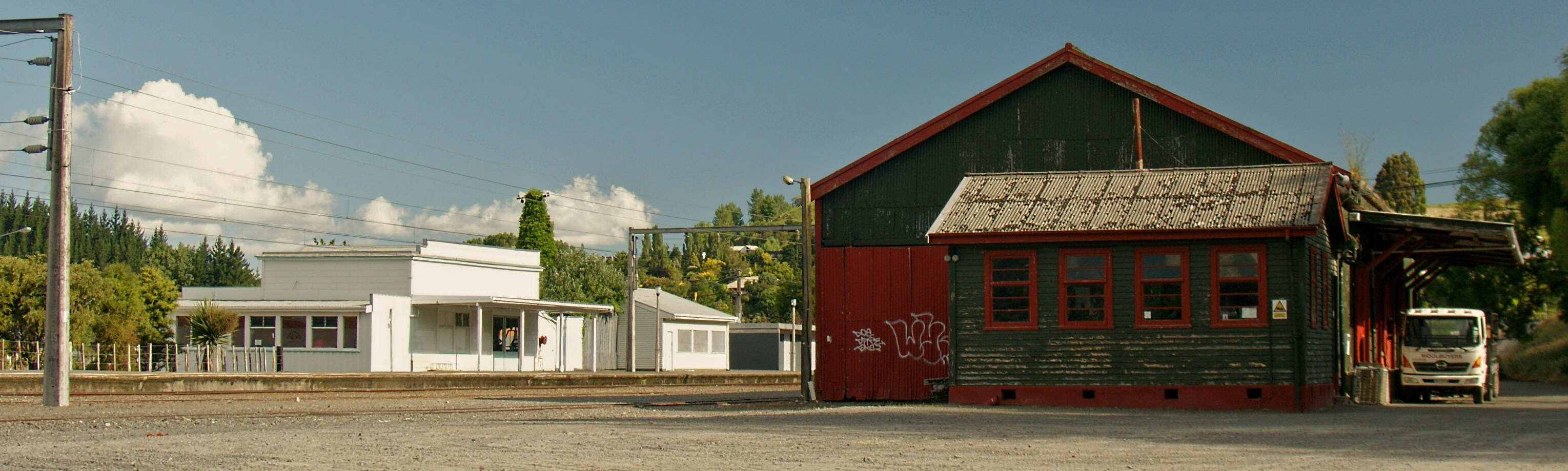
Taihape Rail Stop and goods shed

There were many railway houses situated along the length of Mataroa Road; now only three remain. At one time Taihape had two lodges of the Royal Antediluvian Order of Buffaloes. One of the lodges was named Kaikoura Lodge No 226 (after the local Kaikoura River) this lodge survived until 2007. The lodge once had its own lodge rooms. The former railways house painted purple located on the highway travelling south into Taihape was once one of the two Buffaloes halls. The lodge in Taihape once boasted a large membership due in part to the numbers of Railways and Post Office staff stationed in the town.

In 1999 Tranz Rail demolished the historic Taihape Railway Station. The Refreshment Rooms still stand on the former station platform, as do the old goods shed and locomotive depot compound at the south end of the rail yard. After a long period of fund-raising by Rotary, a loco turntable was re-purchased and installed in the station yard, so that special trains can run to Taihape and turn around for the return run.

== Government and politics ==
=== Local politics ===
Taihape is part of the Rangitikei District, overseen by the Rangitikei District Council. The Mayor of Rangitikei since 2013 is Andy Watson.

=== National government ===
Taihape, like the rest of the Rangitikei District, is located in the general electorate of Rangitīkei and in the Māori electorate of Te Tai Hauāuru. Rangitīkei is a safe National Party seat since the 1938 election with the exception of 1978–1984 when it was held by Bruce Beetham of the Social Credit Party.

Te Tai Hauāuru is a more unstable seat, having been held by three different parties since 1996: New Zealand First, Te Pāti Māori and the Labour Party.

== Education ==
Taihape Area School is a co-educational state area school for Year 1 to 13 students, with a roll of 254 as of July 2026. The school was established in 2005 through the amalgamation of Taihape Primary School (established in 1896) and Taihape College (established 1963) due to the declining rolls at both schools. Taihape District High School was the predecessor to Taihape College.

St Joseph's School, also located in Taihape, is a co-educational state-integrated Catholic primary school for Year 1 to 8 students. with a roll of 78. The school was established in 1916.

== Notable people ==
- Douglas MacDiarmid, artist
- Nehe Milner-Skudder, rugby union player
- Nash Chase, entertainer
- Moke Belliss, rugby union player
