= Rangitikei District Council =

Local government authority for Rangitikei District in New Zealand

Type
- Type: Territorial authority

History
- Founded: 1989

Leadership
- Mayor: Andy Watson
- Deputy mayor: Dave Wilson
- Seats: 11

Elections
- Voting system: First-past-the-post
- Last election: 2025
- Next election: 2028

Meeting place
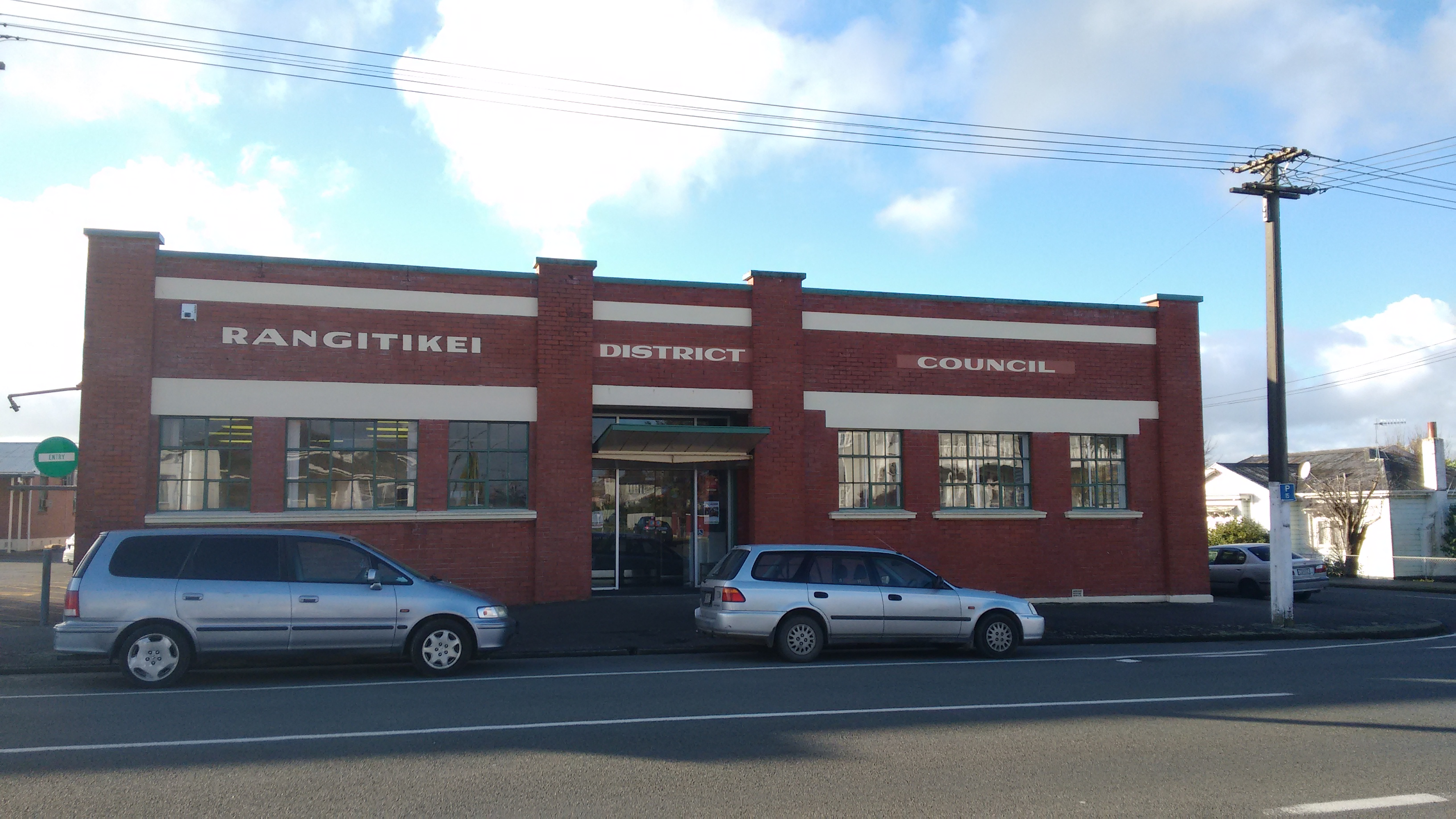
- Rangitikei District Council Building, 46 High St, Marton

Website
- www.rangitikei.govt.nz

The Rangitikei District Council is the local government authority for Rangitikei District in New Zealand. It is a territorial authority elected to represent the 16,000 people of Rangitikei. Since October 2013, the Mayor of Rangitikei is Andy Watson, who succeeded Robert "Chalky" Leary. The council consists of a mayor who is elected at large, and 11 councillors elected across five (three in 2019) wards, one of whom gets chosen as deputy mayor. The councillors are elected under the first-past-the-post (FPTP) system in triennial elections.

== History ==
The Rangitikei District Council was established in 1989 as part of the 1989 local government reforms.

Up to 2019 the District had five wards: Bulls, Hunterville, Marton, Taihape and Turakina. In 2019 the number of wards was reduced to three: Northern, Central and Southern. In 2022 the Northern and Southern Wards changed from three to two members and two new wards Tiikeitia ki Uta (Inland) Māori and Tiikeitia ki Tai (Coastal) Māori were established.

== Council membership ==
=== 2025–2028 ===
The council elected in the 2025 local election is as follows:

| Mayor | | Andy Watson |
Councillors
| Councillors | Northern ward | Jeff Wong; Diana Baird |
| Councillors | Central ward | Fi Dalgety; Dave Wilson; John Hainsworth; Alan Buckendahl; Sandra Field |
| Councillors | Southern ward | Paul Sharland; Graeme O'Fee |
| Councillors | Tiikeitia ki Uta (Inland) ward | Piki Te Ora |
| Councillors | Tiikeitia ki Tai (Coastal) ward | Coral Raukawa |
| Taihape Community Board | Gill Duncan; Peter Kipling-Arthur; De-Anna Green; Melanie Pera | |
| Rātana Community Board | Jason Hihira; Ruthie Lawrence; Charlie Mete; Grace Joan Taiaroa | |

=== 2022–2025 ===
During the 2022–2025 term, the composition of the Council was as follows:

| Mayor | | Andy Watson |
Councillors
| Councillors | Northern ward | Gill Duncan; Jeff Wong |
| Councillors | Central ward | Fi Dalgety; Richard Lambert; Simon Loudon; Greg Maughan; Dave Wilson |
| Councillors | Southern ward | Brian Carter; Paul Sharland* |
| Councillors | Tiikeitia ki Uta (Inland) ward | Tracey Piki Te Ora Hiroa |
| Councillors | Tiikeitia ki Tai (Coastal) ward | Coral Raukawa |
| Taihape Community Board | Emma Abernethy; Les Clarke; Peter Kipling-Arthur; Gail Larsen | |
| Ratana Community Board | Lequan Meihana; Charlie Mete; Jamie Nepia; Grace Taiaroa | |

*Jarrod Calkin resigned on 7 December 2023. A by-election to replace him was completed on 12 April 2024. Paul Sharland was declared elected.

=== 2019–2022 ===
During the 2019–2022 term, the composition of the Council was as follows:

| Mayor | | Andy Watson |
Councillors
| Councillors | Northern ward | Gill Duncan; Angus Gordon; Tracey Hiroa |
| Councillors | Central ward | Cath Ash; Nigel Belsham; Fiona (Fi) Dalgety; Richard Lambert; Dave Wilson |
| Councillors | Southern ward | Brian Carter; Jane Dunn; Waru Panapa |

=== 2016–2019 ===
During the 2016–2019 term, the composition of the Council was as follows:

| Mayor | | Andy Watson |
Councillors
| Councillors | Bulls ward | Jane Dunn; Graeme Platt |
| Councillors | Hunterville ward | Dean McManaway |
| Councillors | Marton ward | Cath Ash; Nigel Belsham; Lynne Sheridan; David Wilson |
| Councillors | Taihape ward | Richard Aslett; Angus Gordon; Ruth Rainey |
| Councillors | Turakina ward | Soraya Peke-Mason |

=== 2013–2016 ===
During the 2013–2016 term, the composition of the Council was as follows:

| Mayor | | Andy Watson |
Councillors
| Councillors | Bulls ward | Tim Harris; Rebecca McNeil |
| Councillors | Hunterville ward | Dean McManaway |
| Councillors | Marton ward | Cath Ash; Nigel Belsham; Mike Jones; Lynne Sheridan |
| Councillors | Taihape ward | Richard Aslett; Angus Gordon; Ruth Rainey |
| Councillors | Turakina ward | Soraya Peke-Mason |

=== 2010–2013 ===
During the 2010–2013 term, the composition of the Council was as follows:

| Mayor | | Chalky Leary |
Councillors
| Councillors | Bulls ward | Michelle Fox; Sarah Harris |
| Councillors | Hunterville ward | Dean McManaway |
| Councillors | Marton ward | Mike Jones; Richard Peirce; Lynne Sheridan; Andy Watson |
| Councillors | Taihape ward | Richard Aslett; Jan Byford; Ed Cherry |
| Councillors | Turakina ward | Soraya Peke-Mason |

=== 2007–2010 ===
During the 2007–2010 term, the composition of the Council was as follows:

| Mayor | | Chalky Leary |
Councillors
| Councillors | Bulls ward | Sarah Harris; Jill Strugnell |
| Councillors | Hunterville ward | Grant Collie |
| Councillors | Marton ward | Mike Jones; Kathleen Murphy; Lynne Sheridan; Andy Watson |
| Councillors | Taihape ward | Don Brown; Jan Byford; Ed Cherry |
| Councillors | Turakina ward | Soraya Peke-Mason |
