= Mayor of Rangitikei =

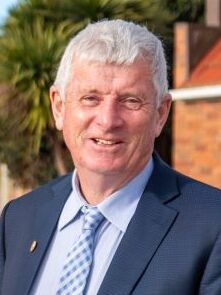
- Incumbent; Andy Watson since 2013
- Style: His/Her Worship
- Term length: Three years, renewable
- Formation: 1989
- Deputy: Dave Wilson
- Salary: $120,751
- Website: Official website

The mayor of Rangitikei is the head of the Rangitikei District Council in New Zealand. The role was created in 1989 with the formation of the Rangitikei District as part of the 1989 local government reforms. The current mayor since 2013 is Andy Watson from Marton.

== History ==
The Rangitikei District was established in 1989 as part of the 1989 local government reforms. In 1989 the first mayor elected was John Patrick Wilson, who was the last Mayor of the Marton Borough Council. John Wilson stayed as mayor until 1998. He had previous experience as a deputy mayor and councillor at the Marton Borough Council.

In 2001 Bob Buchanan was elected mayor despite not having any experience as a councillor or deputy mayor beforehand. He was re-elected in 2004. Buchanan retired from his position in 2007.

Robert "Chalky" Leary was elected mayor in 2007; he had been a councillor for the Hunterville ward since 2001. Leary was elected by receiving 1,639 votes or 31.0% of the votes with a majority of 233 votes or 4.4% over Marton ward councillor Andy Watson. He was re-elected unopposed in 2010.

The 2013 Rangitikei mayoral election saw incumbent mayor Leary facing challenges from former deputy mayor Andy Watson, Fresh Future Focus candidate Maree Brannigan and Taihape ward councillor Richard Aslett. Watson was elected by obtaining 1,983 votes (41.5%) of the total votes and a majority of 486 (10.2%) defeating incumbent mayor Chalky Leary, who received 1,497 votes.

Watson also won the 2016 Rangitikei mayoral election. He was re-elected unopposed in 2019 and won in 2022.

== List of mayors ==
The following list shows the mayors of Rangitikei:

Mayor	Tenure
John Patrick Wilson	1989–1998
John Vickers	1998–2001
Bob Buchanan	2001–2007
Chalky Leary	2007–2013
Andy Watson	2013–present

== List of deputy mayors ==
Name	Term	Mayor
Unknown	1989–c. 1992	Wilson
Derek Cottrell	fl.1992	Wilson
Unknown	c. 1992–2004	–
Andy Watson	2004–2010	Buchanan Leary
Sarah Harris	2010–2013	Leary
Dean McManaway	2013–2016	Watson
Nigel Belsham	2016–2022	Watson
Dave Wilson	2022–present	Watson

== See also ==
- Rangitikei District Council
- 2016 Rangitikei mayoral election
- Mayor of Manawatu
- Mayor of Wanganui
