= Elizabeth Gunn =

Elizabeth Gunn may refer to:

- Elizabeth Gunn (author) (1927–2022), American crime and thriller writer
- Elizabeth Gunn (paediatrician) (1879–1963), founder of New Zealand's Children's Health Camps movement
- Liz Gunn, New Zealand former television host, conspiracy theorist, and founder of NZ political party NZ Loyal
