= Turakina =

Turakina may refer to:

- Turakina River, New Zealand
- Turakina, New Zealand, an old Maori settlement
- Töregene Khatun, wife of Ögedei Khan and regent of the Mongol Empire 1241–1246
