= Health stamp =

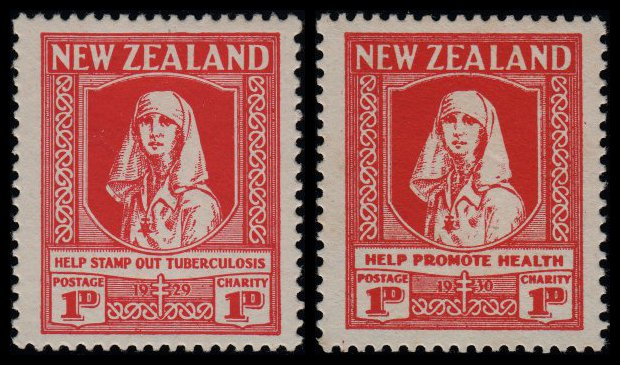
New Zealand's first Christmas Seals/Health Stamps, issued in 1929 and 1930, denominated at one penny postage plus one penny charity

Health stamps are a long-running series of charity stamp issued by New Zealand which include a premium for charitable causes in addition to the charge for postal service. Health stamps were issued annually from 1929 to 2016.

== Origins ==
The idea of issuing health stamps in New Zealand originated in the late 1920s. Initial credit is given to a 1926 request by Mr E Nielsen of Norsewood on behalf of his mother that special fundraising for deserving health projects. Letters and articles promoting the idea appeared in newspaper articles in subsequent years, although the official suggestion for the issue of a stamp is credited to the secretary of the Post Office Department, Mr. G. M'Namara.

The stamps were modeled on Christmas Seals, first issued in Denmark in 1904 and subsequently in other countries. While in other countries Christmas Seals were charity labels that could be affixed to mail along with postage stamp, the New Zealand seals combined both postage and charity in a single label.

Authority to issue charity stamps was created by section 34 of the Finance Act 1929, which states:

... the Postmaster-General may cause to be created special postage-stamps of the denomination of two pence, which shall be available only for the payment of postage on postal packets, and for that purpose shall be deemed to have a value of one penny only.

The act continues to state that the additional revenue raised shall be used:

for such purposes in relation to the prevention or cure of disease or the promotion of public health, as may be approved by the Minister of Health.

== First stamps ==
The first New Zealand Christmas Seal was approved by the Government in October 1929, and issued on 11 December of that year. A statement by Minister of Health Arthur Stallworthy appeared in newspapers on that day, announcing:

To-day we launch our Christmas seal campaign to stamp out tuberculosis

and further identifying the charity:

the first claim upon the funds raised by the inaugural Christmas seal should be the children's health camp movement.

Although the Finance Act 1929 gave the Minister of Health the power to choose the charities supported by the stamps, the idea to support the health camps is credited to the permanent head of the Health Department, Dr Michael Watt.

Health camps had been run in New Zealand since 1919, when Dr Elizabeth Gunn ran a three-week camp for children at Turakina near Wanganui. The camps provided holiday relief for children with nutritional and minor physical problems. Children's health camps have continued to be the recipient of money from New Zealand health stamps from this time on; the country's seven children's health camps (Te Puna Whaiora) are now managed by the New Zealand Foundation for Child and Family Health and Development.

The design for the 1929 Christmas Seal features a nurse, the inscription "HELP STAMP OUT TUBERCULOSIS", and the postage and charity denominations. In 1930 the stamp was reissued with the inscription "HELP PROMOTE HEALTH". In accordance with the 1929 Finance Act, these stamps both sold for two pennies, with one penny for postage, and one penny for charity. The nurse image was drawn by Stanley Davis (Advertising Branch of the New Zealand Railways Department) from a photograph supplied by Phillip Norton Cryer, New Zealand Director General of Post and Telegraph, of his niece, a registered nurse, Nellie Rebecca Burt, born 4 October 1904 and trained as a nurse at Napier Hospital, purely for it suitability and the frame by Leonard Cornwall Mitchell, then a member of the drafting staff at the Government Printing Office. This was Mitchell's first stamp design; he continued as one of New Zealand's most prolific stamp designers until the 1970s.

== The 1931 issue ==
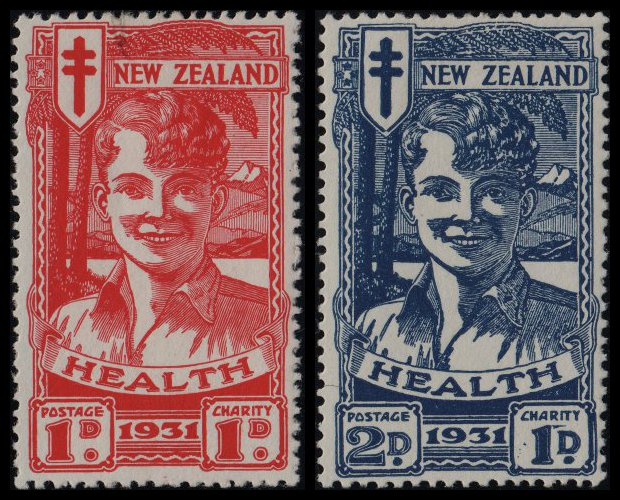
The 1931 Red and Blue Boy stamps

The 1931 issue is perhaps the most famous of the early health stamps. As a depression-era measure, postage rates for private mail had increased to two pennies (this was reversed in 1932), and so a second stamp was needed. As the 1929 Finance Act had explicitly stated the value of charity stamps, an amendment to the act was required to permit the second stamp. This was provided by section 11 of the Finance (No. 4) Act of 1931, which deleted the explicit values, and allowed the Postmaster-General to issue the stamps "in such denominations as he thinks fit."

Two stamps were issued on October 31, 1931. These were again designed by L. C. Mitchell, and are known as the "Red Boy" (denominated as 1d postage plus 1d charity) and "Blue Boy" (2d postage plus 1d charity), collectively known as the "smiling boy" stamps. These stamps included the inscription "Health" above the postage and charity denominations. Newspaper reports refer to the stamps as "Health Stamps". The design received widespread criticism, with an article in the Evening Post (quoting Australian Stamp Monthly) describing the design as the "world's worst" stamp.

These stamps sold poorly due to the hardships of the Great Depression. Today they are scarce and highly prized by New Zealand collectors.

== Later issues ==
A further stamp was issued in 1932, denominated at one penny postage plus one penny health. The "Charity" inscription was dropped completely in favour of "Health", recognizing that the stamps were supporting the Health Camps. This inscription has continued to the present day, and the stamps (retroactively to 1929) are considered to be "Health Stamps" by collectors and New Zealand Post (the successor organization to the New Zealand Post Office Department). The term "Christmas Seal" is now rarely used in relation to these stamps.

From 1933 to 1938, a single health stamp was issued each year, denominated as one penny postage, plus one penny health. For several of these years, the health stamp was the only non-definitive stamp issued by the New Zealand Post Office. The 1933 stamp was the first stamp designed by James Berry, another prolific New Zealand stamp designer.

Section 9 of the Adhesive Stamps Act 1939 replaced the clauses of the 1929 and 1931 Finance Acts under which health stamps were issued, although the powers of the Postmaster-General and Minister of Health were largely unchanged.

In 1939, two stamps were issued. These were initially printed as ½d+½d and 1d+1d stamps, but due to postage rate changes, the postage denominations were overprinted as 1d and 2d before issue. Two values were issued every year from 1939 until 1973, with the exception of 1955, 1956, 1969, and 1971 when there were three values. Owing to wartime strictures, in 1940 and 1941, similar issues to 1939 were used, issued in different colours (both years) and overprinted with the year (1941 only).

From 1973, three values became the norm, often with two lower value stamps of the same value issued as a se-tenant pair, with a third higher value stamp. In 1990, the issue reverted to two values, and most years since that time have had two or three values (the exceptions being in 2000 and 2006, with sets of six stamps issued). The 2009 issue of three stamps carried images from earlier issues to commemorate the eightieth anniversary of New Zealand health stamps.

From 1957, miniature sheets have been issued annually of New Zealand's health stamp issues. Initially these consisted of two separate sheets each containing six stamps of the same value, but since the 1970s one sheet has been issued annually containing the entire set of stamps. Self-adhesive stamps of the lowest value in each year's set have been issued most years since 1996, often in different designs to the gummed-sheet issue. The last health stamps were issued in 2016, and on 27 July 2017 New Zealand Post announced that no more health stamps will be issued due to declining sales and mail volumes.

== Collectable varieties ==
Several of New Zealand's health stamps have notable varieties recognised by collectors. The 1957 set was issued with watermark either sideways or upright, and the 1960 set is found with two different gauges of perforation, one of which came from the miniature sheets. Stamps from the 1977 miniature sheet feature slight design differences, notably the lack of a white border around the design.

The twopenny value of the 1949 health stamp features a notable, though not particularly rare, flaw, with some stamps issued with no dot below the "d" of the value. Far rarer is an incorrect design used for the 40 cent stamp in 1996, which featured a young child sitting in a car. This was withdrawn and replaced with a new design after it was noticed that the child was incorrectly restrained. Some copies of the first design found their way to post offices, both in standard and self-adhesive form; these stamps—known to collectors as the "teddy bear" stamps because of the prominent soft toy in the design—are now among New Zealand's rarest and most collectable stamps.

== Sales and funds raised ==
The following table shows sales figures for each health stamp issued from 1929 to 1945, and the total sum raised for health camps.

Year	Postage	Charity/Health	Sales	Total Charity
1929	1d	1d	592,848	£2470 4s 0d
1930	1d	1d	215,543	£898 1s 11d
1931	1d	1d	74,802	£778 0s 11d
1931	2d	1d	111,929	£778 0s 11d
1932	1d	1d	237,504	£989 4s 0d
1933	1d	1d	260,883	£1086 16s 1d
1934	1d	1d	279,120	£1163 0s 0d
1935	1d	1d	1,250,057	£5208 11s 5d
1936	1d	1d	1,449,980	£6041 11s 8d
1937	1d	1d	897,035	£3737 12s 11d
1938	1d	1d	1,234,720	£5144 13s 4d
1939	1d	½d	482,746	£3155 18s 3d
1939	2d	1d	516,046	£3155 18s 3d
1940	1d	½d	284,756	£2093 2s 6d
1940	2d	1d	359,972	£2093 2s 6d
1941	1d	½d	349,543	£2540 2s 2½d
1941	2d	1d	434,855	£2540 2s 2½d
1942	1d	½d	720,042	£5426 17s 2d
1942	2d	1d	942,425	£5426 17s 2d
1943	1d	½d	3,133,111	£20442 13s 5½d
1943	2d	1d	3,339,686	£20442 13s 5½d
1944	1d	½d	3,045,288	£20532 18s 8d
1944	2d	1d	3,405,260	£20532 18s 8d
1945	1d	½d	3,994,633	£24967 6s 9½d
1945	2d	1d	3,994,845	£24967 6s 9½d

According to a 2008 newspaper article, contributions from health stamps peaked at $158,000 in 1996, but had fallen to $35,000 in 2007.

== See also ==
- The 'Smiling Boy' Health stamps of 1931
- Postage stamps and postal history of New Zealand
- Charity stamp
- Semi-postal stamp
