= Thomas Garland =

Thomas or Tom Garland may refer to:

- Thomas Garland (broadcaster) (1877–1964), New Zealand broadcaster and businessman
- Thomas J. Garland (1866–1931), American Episcopal bishop
- Tom Garland (trade unionist) (1893–1952), Scottish-born Australian trade unionist
- Tom Garland (Port Adelaide footballer), Australian rules footballer who played for Port Adelaide in the 1950s
- Tom Garland (footballer, born 1943), Australian rules footballer who played for Richmond
