= Peter Hawes =

New Zealand playwright and scriptwriter (1947–2018)

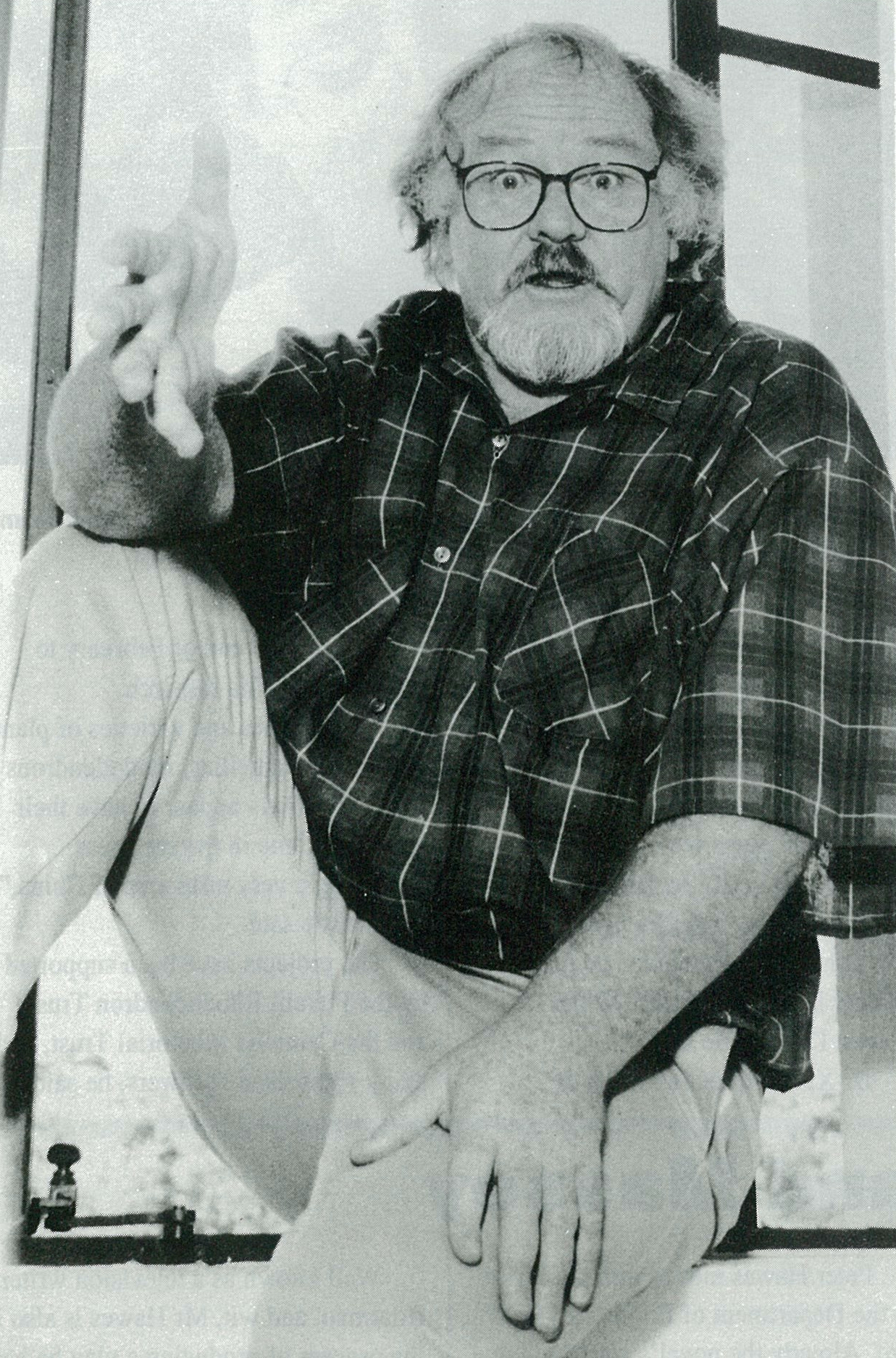
- Hawes in 1994
- Born: Peter Robert Hawes; 30 September 1947; Westport, New Zealand
- Died: 29 October 2018 (aged 71); Koitiata, New Zealand
- Education: University of Canterbury
- Occupation: Writer
- Writing career
- Years active: 1974–2018
- Genres: Novel, playwriting, scriptwriting

Peter Robert Hawes (30 September 1947 – 29 October 2018) was a New Zealand playwright, novelist, and scriptwriter.

== Biography ==
Born in Westport, Hawes gained a Bachelor of Arts degree at the University of Canterbury, in Christchurch.

While living in Barcelona, he wrote a novel about the Spanish Inquisition, a best seller in its Spanish translation by J. A. Bravo: La Hoguera (The Bonfire), published in 1974. After returning to New Zealand in 1975, he worked for television, as a researcher and journalist, and as a scriptwriter for various series, including Fraggle Rock, and Against the Law.

Several of his plays remain unperformed; for example, A Higher Form of Killing.

Hawes died at Koitiata on 29 October 2018.

== Selected works ==
=== Novels ===
- La Hoguera (in Spanish) (The Bonfire), 1974
- Tasman's Lay, 1995
- Leapfrog with Unicorns, 1996
- Playing Waterloo, 1998
- Inca Girls Aren't Easy, 1999
- The Dream of Nikau Jam, 2000
- Royce, Royce, the People's Choice, 2002

=== Plays ===
- Alf's General Theory of Relativity, 1981
- Ptolemy's Dip, 1982
- Armageddon Revisited, 1983
- Goldie: A Good Joke, a portrait of the early New Zealand painter C. F. Goldie, 1987
- 1946 The Boat Train, which examines the effect of the World War 2 on the lives of four women, 1991
- Aunt Daisy!, 1989
- The 1944 Olympic Games, one-act play
- A Higher Form of Killing, about physicist Ernest Rutherford
- The Inquisition Dies, developed from material in La Hoguera

=== Other ===
Hawes, Peter (2014), Forty Years of Centrepoint Theatre: The History According to Hawes (PDF), p. 77, Wikidata Q107708826, a history of Centrepoint Theatre in Palmerston North

- Animals for the Asking verses by Peter R. Hawes, Illustrations by David Johnstone 1979 Whitcoulls Publishers
