= Mangapapa River (Manawatū-Whanganui) =

River in Manawatu-Whanganui Region, New Zealand

- Location within New Zealand
- Etymology: Māori meaning "flat stream"
- Native name: Mangapapa (Māori)

Location
- Country: New Zealand
- Region: Manawatū-Whanganui
- District: Rangitikei

Physical characteristics
- Source: 3 km (1.9 mi) west of Mataroa
  - coordinates: 39°38′41″S 175°41′26″E
  - elevation: 660 metres (2,170 ft)
- Mouth: Turakina River
  - coordinates: 39°48′10″S 175°30′58″E
  - elevation: 150 metres (490 ft)
- Length: 55 kilometres (34 mi)

Basin features
- Progression: Mangapapa River
- River system: Turakina River → Turakina River

The Mangapapa River is a river of the Manawatū-Whanganui region of New Zealand's North Island. The river rises near the remote settlement of Mangapapa, northwest of Mangaweka. It flows westward through heavily eroded hilly farmland to meet the Turakina River. There is a 12-metre (39 ft) waterfall on the lower reaches of the river.

== See also ==
- List of rivers of New Zealand
