= Centrepoint Theatre =

Theatre and production company in New Zealand

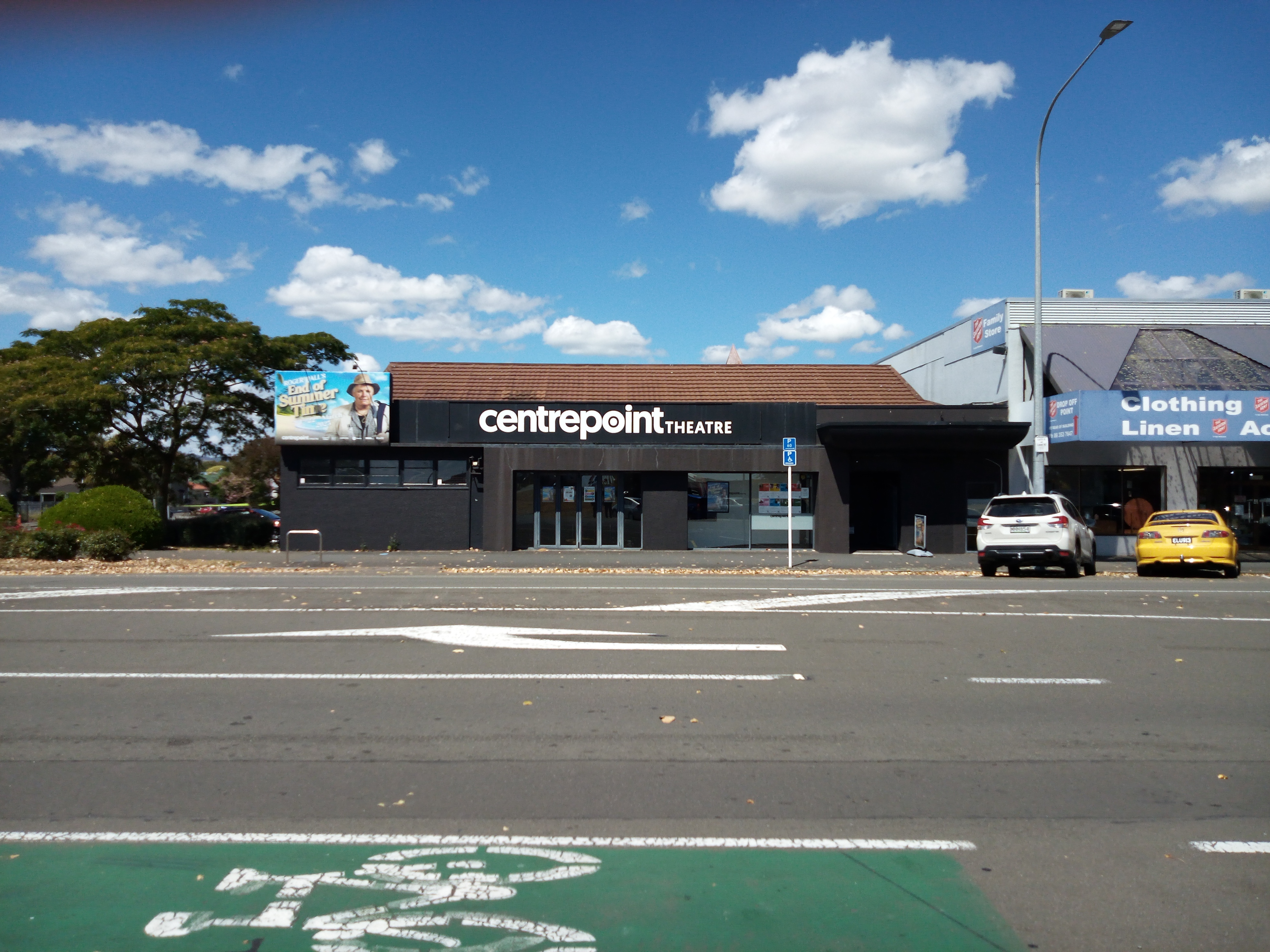
- Centrepoint Theatre, corner of Pitt Street and Church Street (2025)
- Interactive map of Centrepoint Theatre
- Former names: Centrepoint Theatre and Licensed Restaurant (1974–1994)
- Address: 280 Church Street; Palmerston North; New Zealand
- Coordinates: 40.35963°S 175.60729°E
- Capacity: Main Theatre: 136 seats

Construction
- Opened: November 1973

Website
- https://centrepoint.co.nz/

Centrepoint Theatre is a theatre and theatre company in Palmerston North in New Zealand. Established in 1973, the theatre has employed more than 2500 actors and produced more New Zealand plays than any other theatre.

== History ==
The theatre opened at 81 George Street in November 1973, when the nightclub that previously occupied the premises had closed. Don Hampton had previously set up a theatre in Australia, and set 81 George Street up as a charitable trust, along similar lines to Downstage Theatre in Wellington. The theatre seated around 80 people on freestanding chairs, and served meals to subsidise the productions. The first production was of An Evening with Katherine Mansfield starring Pat Evison. Actor John Watson remembered one menu as "Mushroom sautéed in white wine and garlic served on Vogel's bread with mozzarella with crusty rolls; Main, savoury vegetarian samosas or marinated skewered and grilled lamb; dessert, date, rum and raisin pie."

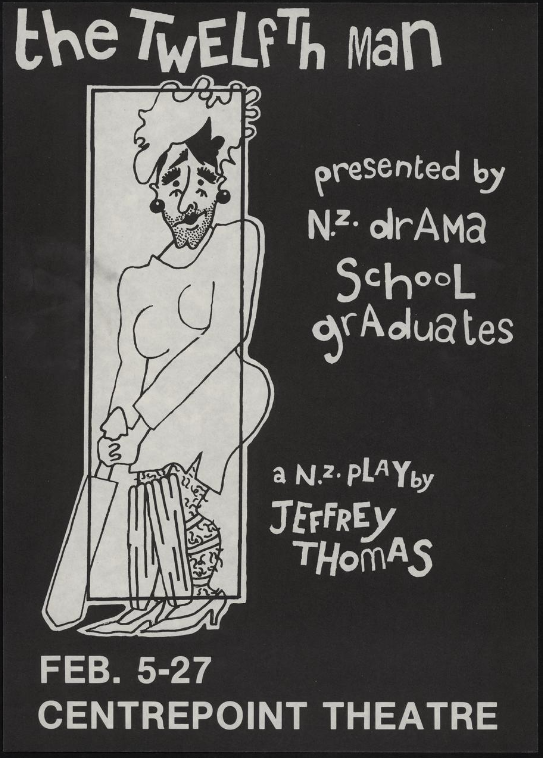
Centrepoint Theatre poster

The theatre's first full season opened January 22, 1974, supported by a grant of $2000 from the QEII Arts Council. The 13-production season included Christopher Hampton's The Philanthropist, Terrence McNally's Sweet Eros, Emanuel Peluso's Good Day, René de Obaldia's Wind in the Branches of the Sassafras Tree, Peter Nichols's A Day in the Death of Joe Egg, Richard Hugget's The First Night of Pygmalion, Harold Pinter's Old Times, Bruce Mason's The End of the Golden Weather, Tom Stoppard's The Real Inspector Hound, Eduardo Manet's The Nuns, Moore's An Infinite Number of Monkeys, Terence Feely's Don’t Let Summer Come, Gateway Theatre's The Nobodies From Nowhere, and Noel Coward's Private Lives. Each production ran for three weeks.

By 1978, the 80-seat theatre was due to be demolished and the theatre relocated to its current location, a former train workshop, on the corner of the Church and Pitt Street. The inaugural production in the new venue was Twelfth Night.

In 1982 the Arts Council stopped Centrepoint's funding. The theatre survived through charity, appearances from big names such as Ray Henwood, directors including Simon Phillips, Richard Mudford, George Webby and David Copeland, and fundraising activities such a benefit concert from the cast of Downstage's Hamlet on their night off.

In 1994, the Bank of New Zealand became principal sponsor, a position they retained for 17 years. The same year, the theatre restaurant, which had originally subsidised the productions but had been losing money for some years, finally closed.

In 2010 Centrepoint was confirmed as one of the 22 arts organisations to benefit from the Arts Council's Toi Haemata Tōtara investment programme, providing financial support from 2–5 years, starting in 2012.

=== Artistic directors ===
- Don Hampton (1973–1974)
- Paul Minifie (1974–1978)
- Murray Lynch (1978–1981)
- Jan Prettejohns (1981–1983)
- Stuart Devenie (1983–1985)
- William Walker (1985–1986)
- Alison Quigan (1986–2004)
- Simon Ferry (2005–2008)
- Kate Louise Elliot (2008–2013)
- Jeff Kingsford-Brown (2013–2017)
- Daniel Pengelly (2017–2021)
- Kate Louise Elliot (2021– )

== Notable productions ==
In the first season, only one of the productions was a New Zealand play. In 1976, four New Zealand plays were produced: Meeting Place by Robert Lord, Mothers and Fathers by Joseph Musaphia, Not Christmas But Guy Fawkes by Bruce Mason, and The Robbie Horror Show by John Banas.

In 1993 Centrepoint was the first theatre to put on an entire season of New Zealand plays: Stretchmarks by Sarah Delahunty, Joyful and Triumphant by Robert Lord, starring Norman Forsey, Kate Harcourt, and Dorothy McKegg, He Repo Haka – Swamp Dance commissioned from Jeff Addison, Let’s Spend the Night Together by Anthony McCarten, starring Tim Balme, Lovelock’s Dream Run by David Geary, By Degrees by Roger Hall, and Ladies Night by Stephen Sinclair and Anthony McCarten. In the four years programmed by Kate Louise Elliott, only one play was not a New Zealand play.

In 1994 Jim Moriarty directed Riwia Brown's Roimata, and John Broughton's Michael James Manaia, and began a Centrepoint tradition of presenting at least two Māori plays each year.

The theatre has hosted visited productions from Helen Moulder of Meeting Karpovsky, The Legend Returns in 1991 and Gloria's Handbag in 2014.

Centrepoint has produced eleven plays by Alison Quigan:

- by Alison Quigan: Mum’s Choir (2004), Girls’ Weekend Escape (2004), Ladies For Hire (2009)
- by Alison Quigan and Ross Gumbley: Five Go Barmy in Palmy (1994), Biggles on Top (1995), Boys at the Beach (1997), Shop Till You Drop (1998), Newbury Hall Dances (1999), The Big OE (2000)
- by Alison Quigan and Lucy Schmidt: Sisters (2001), Netballers (2002)

By the time of 40th anniversary in 2013, Peter Hawes wrote:

“We have produced more than 300 main bill productions, employed more than 2500 actors, directors and designers and injected more than six million dollars into the Palmerston North economy. We have produced more New Zealand plays than any other theatre and were the first company to present (in 1993) a whole year of NZ plays. In our 40 years we have used 10,000,000 nails screws and brads, 60,000 litres of paint, over 50,000 light bulbs, 30,000 sheets of ply, 80,000 metres of timber and 6,000 batteries.”

== Activities ==
Annually Centrepoint Theatre presents five or six main-bill shows. Other programmes include the Basement Company, 'a year-long training and performance programme for young performers aged 16 to 21' that present two shows a year and theatre sports championships. A script development programme called the Sunday Script Sessions are regular events where short works by emerging playwrights are presented with a team of professional directors and actors.

Furthermore, the company employs Spontaneous, a troupe of professional performers. They present an improv comedy show on the final Friday of each month.
