= Semi-postal stamp =

Type of postage stamp

A semi-postal stamp or semipostal stamp, also known as a charity stamp, is a postage stamp issued to raise money for a particular purpose (such as a charitable cause) and sold at a premium over the postal value. Typically the stamp shows two denominations separated by a plus sign, but in many cases the only denomination shown is for the postage rate, and the postal customer simply pays the higher price when purchasing the stamps.

== The first semi-postals ==
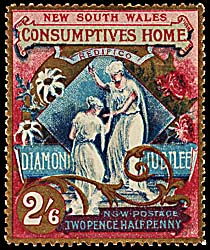
New South Wales's first semi-postal stamps

The first semi-postal was actually a postal card; to commemorate the Uniform Penny Post in 1890, the United Kingdom of Great Britain and Ireland issued a card with a face value of one penny, but sold it for sixpence, with the difference given to a fund for postal workers. The first semi-postal stamps were issued in 1897 by the Australian colonies of New South Wales and Victoria, who both marked the Diamond Jubilee of Queen Victoria with stamps denominated in pennies, but sold for shillings, a 12× increase over the face value. Both issues had 1d and 2½d stamps which sold for 1/- and 2/6 respectively. The difference between the nominated value and the selling price was contributed to Hospital Funds. The New South Wales fund was the Consumptives Home established to care for people with tuberculosis. In 1900, the Australian States of Victoria and Queensland issued sets of two stamps to raise funds for those returning from the Boer War and their families.

== Twentieth century issues ==
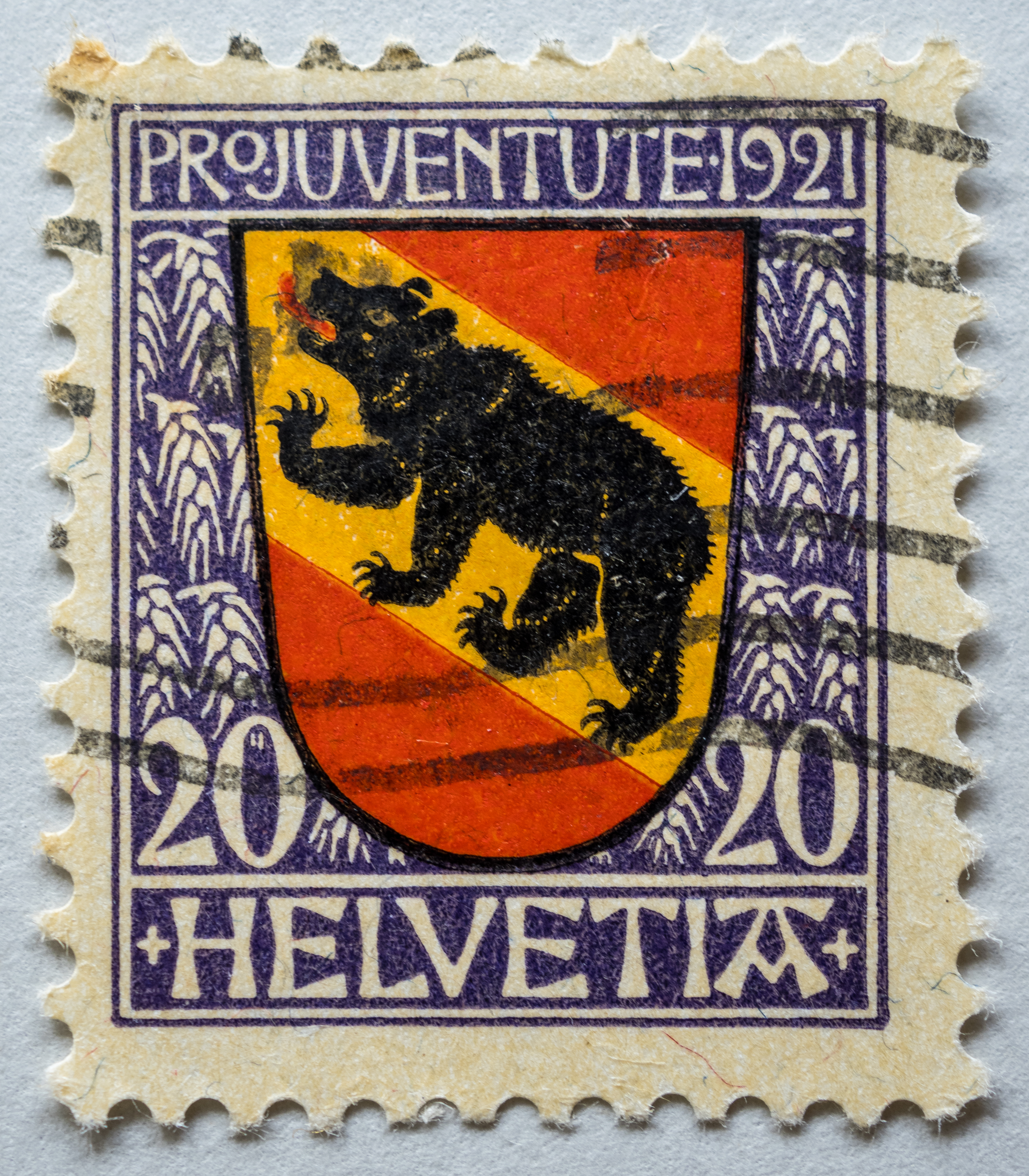
Pro Juventute 1921 (20 ct. + 5 ct.), Switzerland

Semi-postals became widespread in European countries at the beginning of the 20th century. In many cases they have become standard annual issues, such as the Pro Juventute series of Switzerland started in 1913. Many countries issued semi-postal stamps to raise money for the Red Cross in World War I. The surcharges are typically a fraction of the face value; at one point the Fédération Internationale de Philatélie was officially boycotting stamps with surcharges greater than 50 per cent of face value, saying that such issues were exploitive of stamp collectors. The United Kingdom's Royal Mail, a relative newcomer to semi-postals, issued its first stamp of this type in 1975 with a 4 1/2p denomination and a premium of 1 1/2p for charitable causes making the total cost 6p, with funds going to health and handicap charities. The stamp issue was not considered a success and there have been few UK semi-postal issues since.

Some non-European countries followed suit (such as New Zealand, which has issued health stamps annually since 1929); the New Zealand associated territories of the Cook Islands and Niue often issue Christmas or Easter stamps in two sets of values, with one set having a charitable surcharge. But semi-postal stamps are still predominantly European. By contrast, the United States is a newcomer to semi-postals, with its first semi-postal being the Breast cancer research stamp issued in July 1998. Through 2016 four additional stamps were issued, three for other causes and the fourth a reissue of the Breast cancer stamp. A subsequent law allowed five more stamps to be issued at two-year intervals. The first, for Alzheimer's disease, was released in November, 2017.

Semi-postal issues are not always issued on a regular basis for health and similar causes; they have been on occasion issued as a means of raising funds for disaster relief. These are usually sold as charity stamps, though occasionally, as with the 1971 refugee relief stamps of India, the excess cost has been made obligatory (a postal tax stamp). One of the highest value semi-postal stamps is the Falkland Islands' "rebuilding fund" stamp, issued in 1982 after the Argentine invasion. This was aimed primarily at collectors, and had a postal value of £1 with an added £1 surcharge.

Charitable disaster relief stamps are commonly found in smaller island nations as a result of natural disasters, as in the case of Saint Vincent and the Grenadines 1980 hurricane relief issues, and Tonga's 1982 cyclone relief stamp. In these cases, existing issues are often used, overprinted with text indicating the reason for the surcharge.

== Bibliography ==
- Richard McP. Cabeen (1979). Standard Handbook of Stamp Collecting. Harper & Row. pp. 455–457. ISBN 0-690-01773-1.
