= 1951 Birthday Honours (New Zealand) =

Awards list for New Zealand

The 1951 King's Birthday Honours in New Zealand, celebrating the official birthday of King George VI, were appointments made by the King on the advice of the New Zealand government to various orders and honours to reward and highlight good works by New Zealanders. They were announced on 7 June 1951.

The recipients of honours are displayed here as they were styled before their new honour.

== Order of the Companions of Honour (CH) ==
- The Right Honourable Sidney George Holland – Prime Minister of New Zealand.
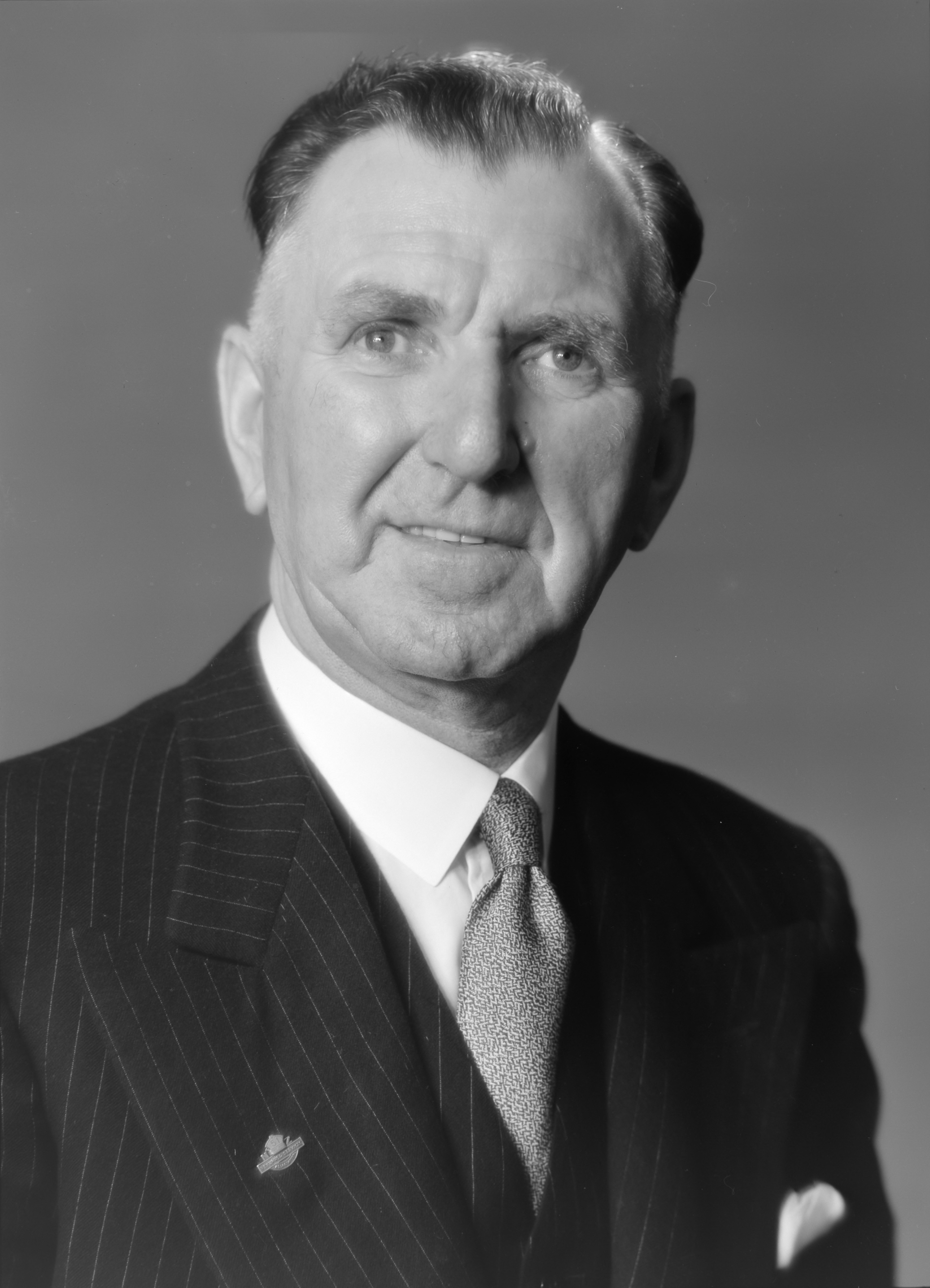
Sidney Holland

== Knight Bachelor ==
- The Honourable Arthur Fair MC – of Auckland; senior puisne judge of the Supreme Court.
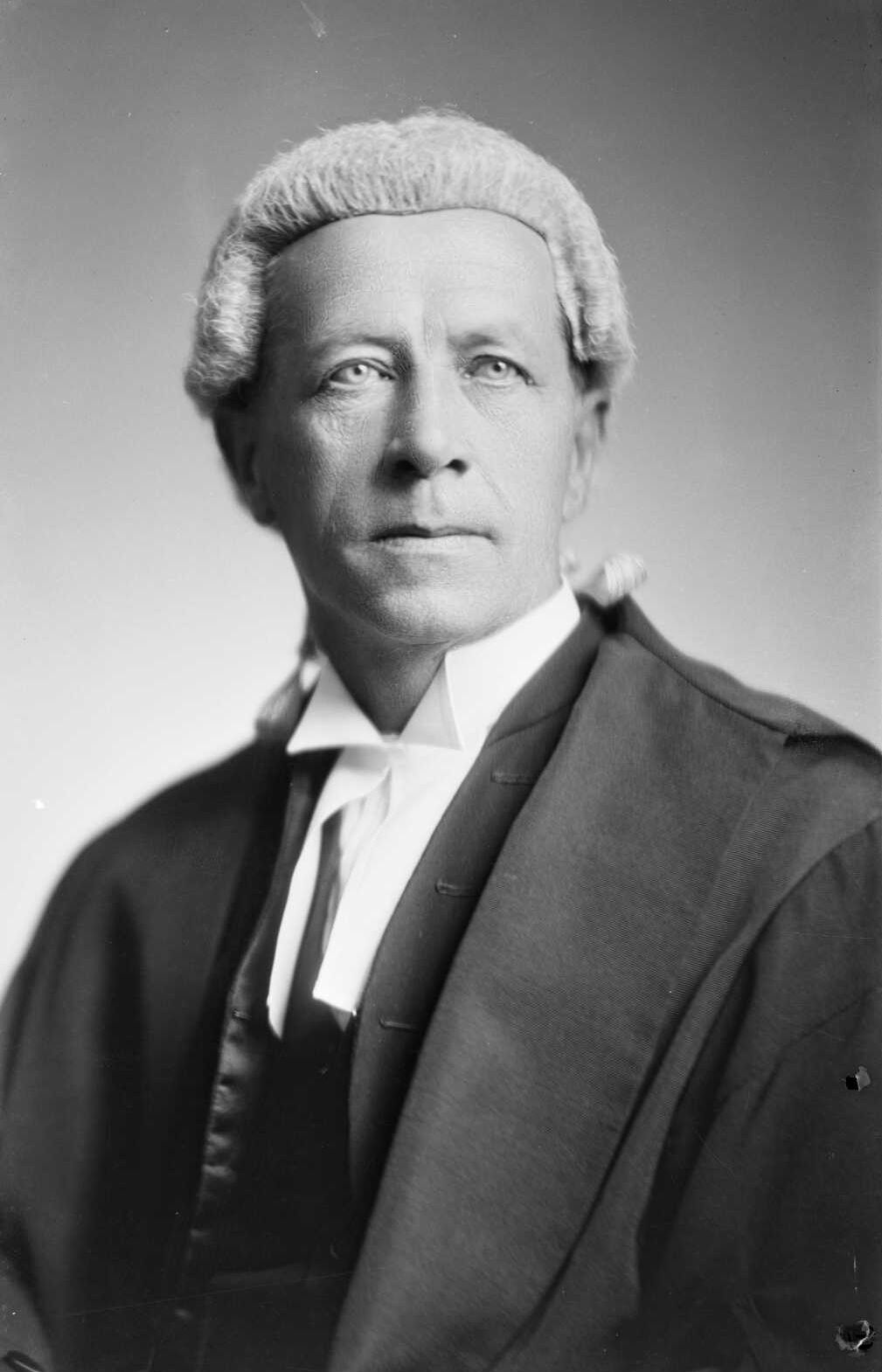
Sir Arthur Fair

== Order of Saint Michael and Saint George ==
=== Knight Commander (KCMG) ===
- William John Polson – of Fordell. For public and political services.
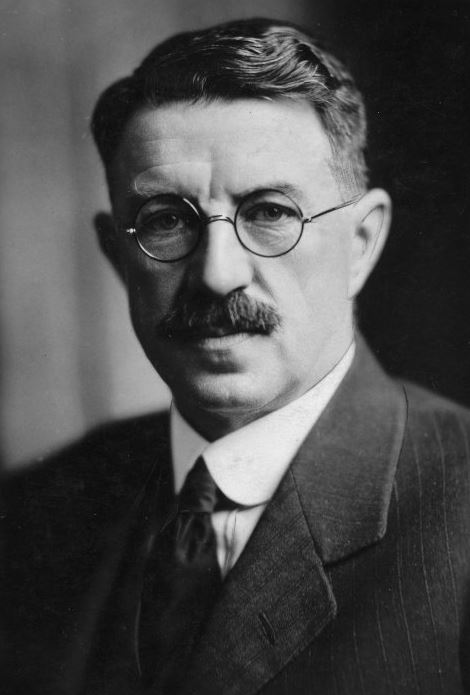
Sir William Polson

== Order of the British Empire ==
=== Dame Commander (DBE) ===
Civil division

- Elizabeth May Gilmer OBE – of Wellington. For distinguished service in civic and community affairs.
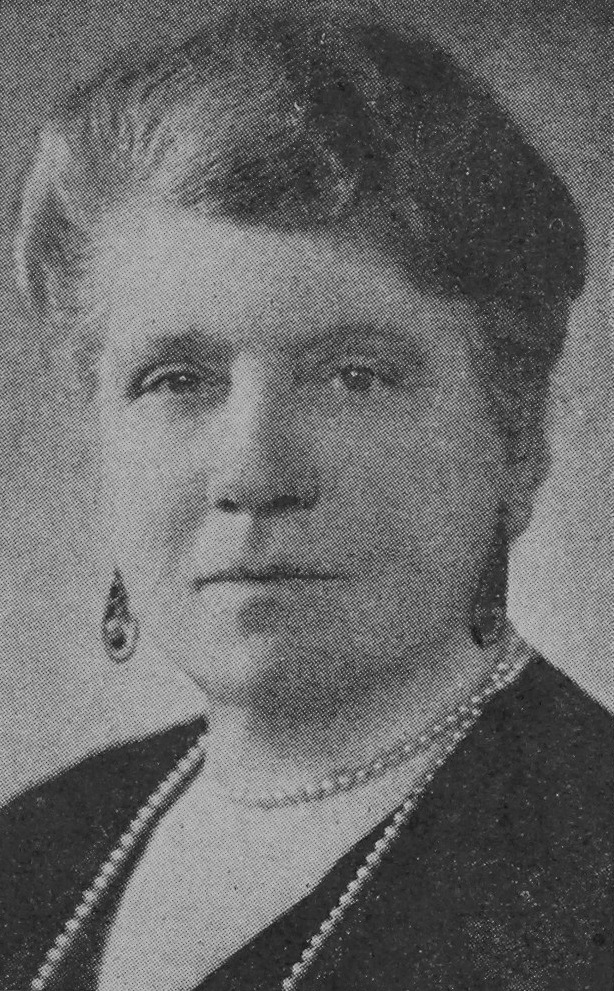
Dame Elizabeth Gilmer

=== Commander (CBE) ===
Civil division

- Ernest James Fawcett MC – of Wellington; director-general of agriculture, Department of Agriculture.
- Bernard Edward Murphy – of Wellington; professor of economics, Victoria University College, 1920–1950. For services to education.
- John Porteous Rutherford – of Wellington; controller and auditor-general, Audit Department.
- Leonard Owen Howard Tripp OBE – of Wellington. For patriotic and social welfare services.

=== Officer (OBE) ===
Civil division

- Thomas William Mark Ashby – of Auckland. For municipal services.
- Hugh Blake Burdekin – of Levin. For services to returned servicemen.
- Alfred Edward Caddick – of Christchurch. For services to education, dramatic art and sport.
- William Reynolds Carey – of Christchurch. For services to the community.
- Letty Mabel Croft – of Napier; matron and lady superintendent, Napier Public Hospital.
- James William Dove JP – of Dunedin. For services to the community, especially in local-government affairs.
- Hugh Charles Jenkins – of Wanganui. For services to journalism.
- Kenneth Ewart Luke MNZIE – city engineer, Wellington.
- Thomas James Maling – of Christchurch. For services to the community.
- Harry Montefiore Wilson BCh MB – of Hastings; a medical practitioner.

Military division

- Commander Alexander Cochrane Swanson VRD AMICE – Royal New Zealand Naval Volunteer Reserve.
- Lieutenant-Colonel Edward Trevor Kensington ED – Royal New Zealand Artillery.
- Squadron Leader Grevis Goetz – Royal New Zealand Air Force.
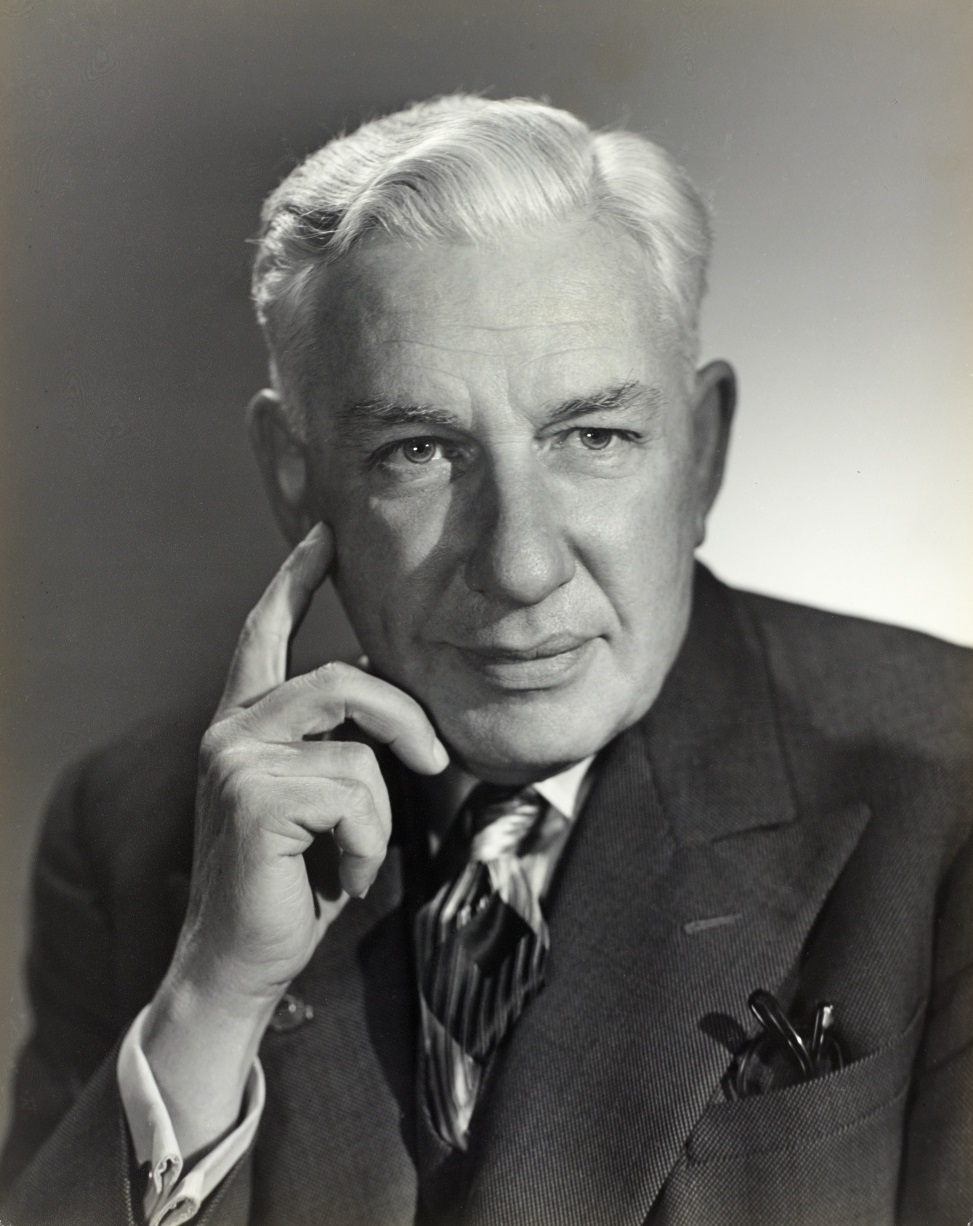
Thomas Ashby

=== Member (MBE) ===
Civil division

- Morris John Barnett – of Christchurch. For services to horticulture.
- William Bringans – of Alexandra. For services to local government.
- Alexander Christie Cameron MC – of Dunedin. For services to the community in Dunedin.
- John Wiltshire Card – of Featherston. For services to local government.
- Norman Royle-Chapman JP – of Auckland. For services in connection with various public and patriotic organisations.
- Herbert Peachey Desmoulins – of Dunedin. For patriotic services, especially in connection with the Food for Britain campaign.
- Agnes Marshall Ferguson – of Auckland. For services to the New Zealand Red Cross Society.
- Harry Cecil Alderson Fox – of Hāwera. For services to music.
- Thomas Threader Garland – of Auckland. For services to the community, especially as a conductor of children's choirs.
- John Guiniven – of Takapuna. For municipal services.
- Elizabeth Catherine Gunn MB ChB – of Wellington; a former director of the School of Hygiene, Wellington. For public services.
- Annie Henry – of Ōhope. For services rendered under the auspices of the Presbyterian Māori Mission to the Māori people.
- Margaret Jane McKerrow – of Hampden. For services to the community.
- Stella Murray – of London. For social welfare services on behalf of New Zealanders in the United Kingdom.
- Alexander James Nicol – of Gisborne. For public and social welfare services.
- Jane Trotter – of Christchurch; an obstetrical nurse.
- Ninian George Trotter MD CM – of Riverton. For public and social-welfare services.
- Charles Edward Wheeler – of Wellington; a parliamentary journalist.
- Mary Frances Wyber – of Balclutha. For services to the community, especially in connection with the Returned Services' Association and charitable organisations at Balclutha.

Military division

- Hiram William Harris – temporary senior commissioned engineer, Royal New Zealand Navy.
- Captain John Ayto – Royal New Zealand Corps of Signals.
- Major Jack Sloan Berry – Royal New Zealand Engineers.
- Warrant Officer First Class Richard Wilson Heaps – Royal New Zealand Army Service Corps.
- Lieutenant Ellen Marion Pysden – New Zealand Women's Army Corps.
- Flight-Lieutenant Gordon Alan Lee Webby DFC – Royal New Zealand Air Force.
- Warrant Officer Mervyn Milton Bentley – Royal New Zealand Air Force.
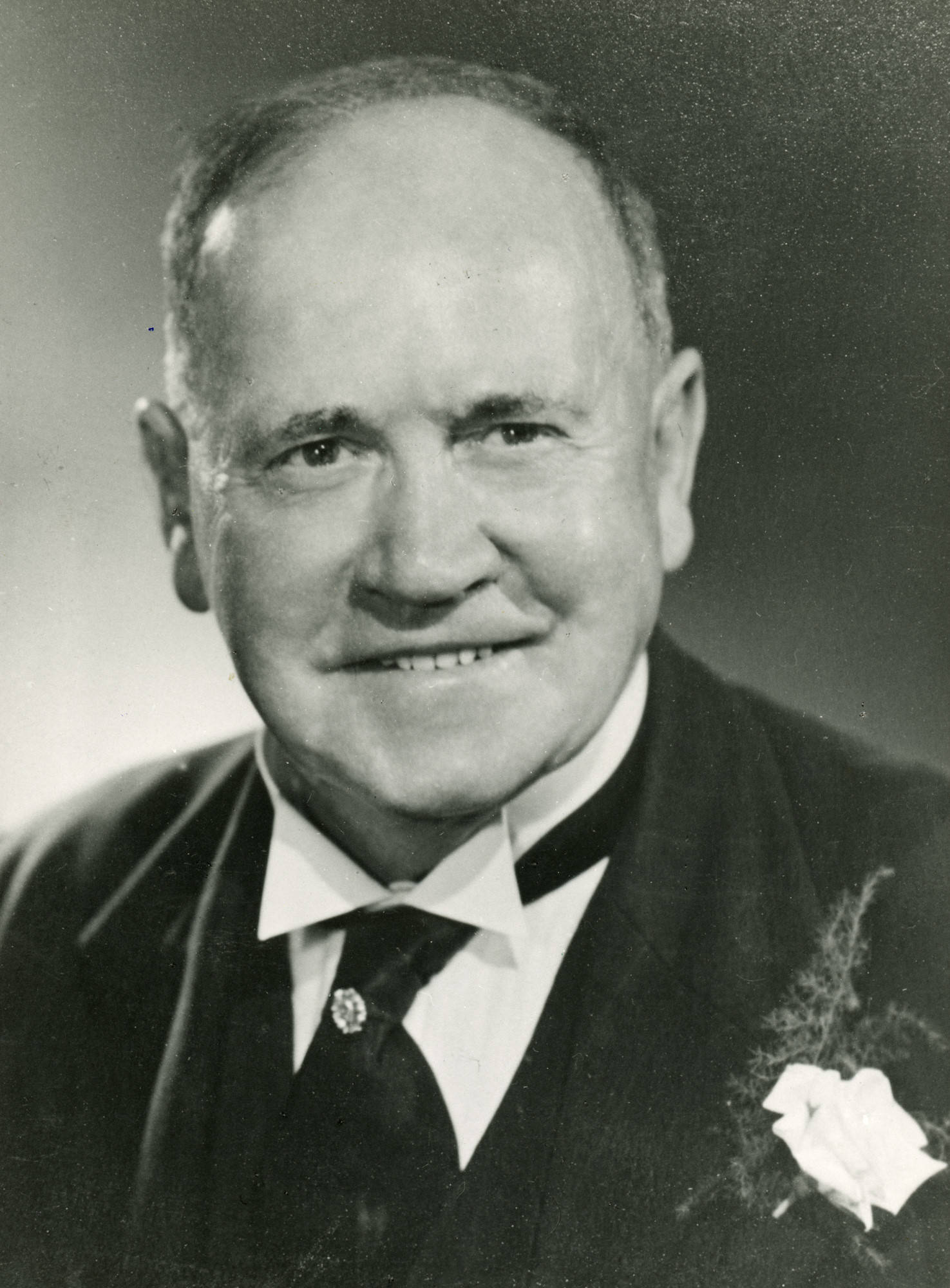
John Guiniven

== Companion of the Imperial Service Order (ISO) ==
- Percy Roy Angus AMIMechE MNZIE – of Lower Hutt; lately chief mechanical engineer, Railways Department.

== British Empire Medal (BEM) ==
Military division

- Petty Officer Arthur George Cooper – Royal New Zealand Navy.
- Chief Joiner Edward Ernest Dorrell – Royal New Zealand Navy.
- Staff Sergeant (temporary Warrant Officer, Second Class) John Allan – New Zealand Regiment, New Zealand Army
- Flight Sergeant Donald Edward Harris – Royal New Zealand Air Force.
- Corporal Christopher John Lennox – Royal New Zealand Air Force.

== Royal Red Cross ==
=== Associate (ARRC) ===
- Charge Sister Phyllis May Aitcheson – New Zealand Army Nursing Service.

== Air Force Cross (AFC) ==
- Flight Lieutenant Donald Miles Hutton – Royal New Zealand Air Force.
