= Papanui Junction =

- Rural community
- Interactive map of Papanui Junction
- Coordinates: 39.677°S 175.549°E
- Country: New Zealand
- Region: Manawatū-Whanganui
- Territorial authority: Rangitikei District
- Wards: Northern General Ward; Tiikeitia ki Uta (Inland) Māori Ward
- Community: Taihape Community
- Electorates: Whanganui; Te Tai Hauāuru (Māori)

Government
  - Territorial Authority: Rangitikei District Council
  - Regional council: Horizons Regional Council
  - Mayor of Rangitikei: Andy Watson
  - Whanganui MP: Carl Bates
  - Te Tai Hauāuru MP: Debbie Ngarewa-Packer

Area
  - Total: 190.99 km^{2} (73.74 sq mi)

Population (2023 Census)
  - Total: 141
  - Density: 0.738/km^{2} (1.91/sq mi)

Papanui Junction is a rural community in the Rangitikei District and Manawatū-Whanganui region of New Zealand's North Island. It is located west of Taihape, in the Turakina Valley.

== Overview ==
Several Māori land blocks are located in the hill country north-east of the junction, including a 157.7-hectare (390-acre) lot with 87 owners and a 52.5-hectare (130-acre) lot with 173 owners.

The area's windy gravel roads may have been a factor in a fatal crash in 2008.

GNS Science recorded slight landsliding on the hills between Papanui Junction and Kakatahi during flooding in June 2015.

== Demographics ==
Papanui Junction locality covers 190.99 km^{2} (73.74 sq mi). It is part of the larger Mokai Patea statistical area.

Historical population
Year	Pop.	±% p.a.
2006	141	—
2013	141	+0.00%
2018	129	−1.76%
2023	141	+1.79%

Papanui Junction had a population of 141 in the 2023 New Zealand census, an increase of 12 people (9.3%) since the 2018 census, and unchanged since the 2013 census. There were 84 males and 57 females in 51 dwellings. The median age was 28.2 years (compared with 38.1 years nationally). There were 27 people (19.1%) aged under 15 years, 45 (31.9%) aged 15 to 29, 54 (38.3%) aged 30 to 64, and 12 (8.5%) aged 65 or older.

People could identify as more than one ethnicity. The results were 83.0% European (Pākehā), 14.9% Māori, 4.3% Pasifika, and 4.3% other, which includes people giving their ethnicity as "New Zealander". English was spoken by 91.5%, Māori by 6.4%, and other languages by 4.3%. No language could be spoken by 2.1% (e.g. too young to talk). The percentage of people born overseas was 8.5, compared with 28.8% nationally.

The sole religious affiliation given was 38.3% Christian. People who answered that they had no religion were 57.4%, and 4.3% of people did not answer the census question.

Of those at least 15 years old, 12 (10.5%) people had a bachelor's or higher degree, 72 (63.2%) had a post-high school certificate or diploma, and 27 (23.7%) people exclusively held high school qualifications. The median income was $46,300, compared with $41,500 nationally. 6 people (5.3%) earned over $100,000 compared to 12.1% nationally. The employment status of those at least 15 was 84 (73.7%) full-time and 18 (15.8%) part-time.

== Education ==
Papanui Junction School is a co-educational state primary school for Year 1 to 8 students, with a roll of 10 as of July 2026. It is the most isolated school in the wider Taihape area. It has been open since at least 1909.

The school held a commemorative Daffodil Day in August 2016 to commemorate a local man who was heavily involved in the school, who had recently died of cancer.

Papaunui Junction School is a sole charge school due to its low roll. In June 2018, the New Zealand Educational Institute campaigned for better conditions for the sole charge principal.
