= Turakina River =

River in New Zealand

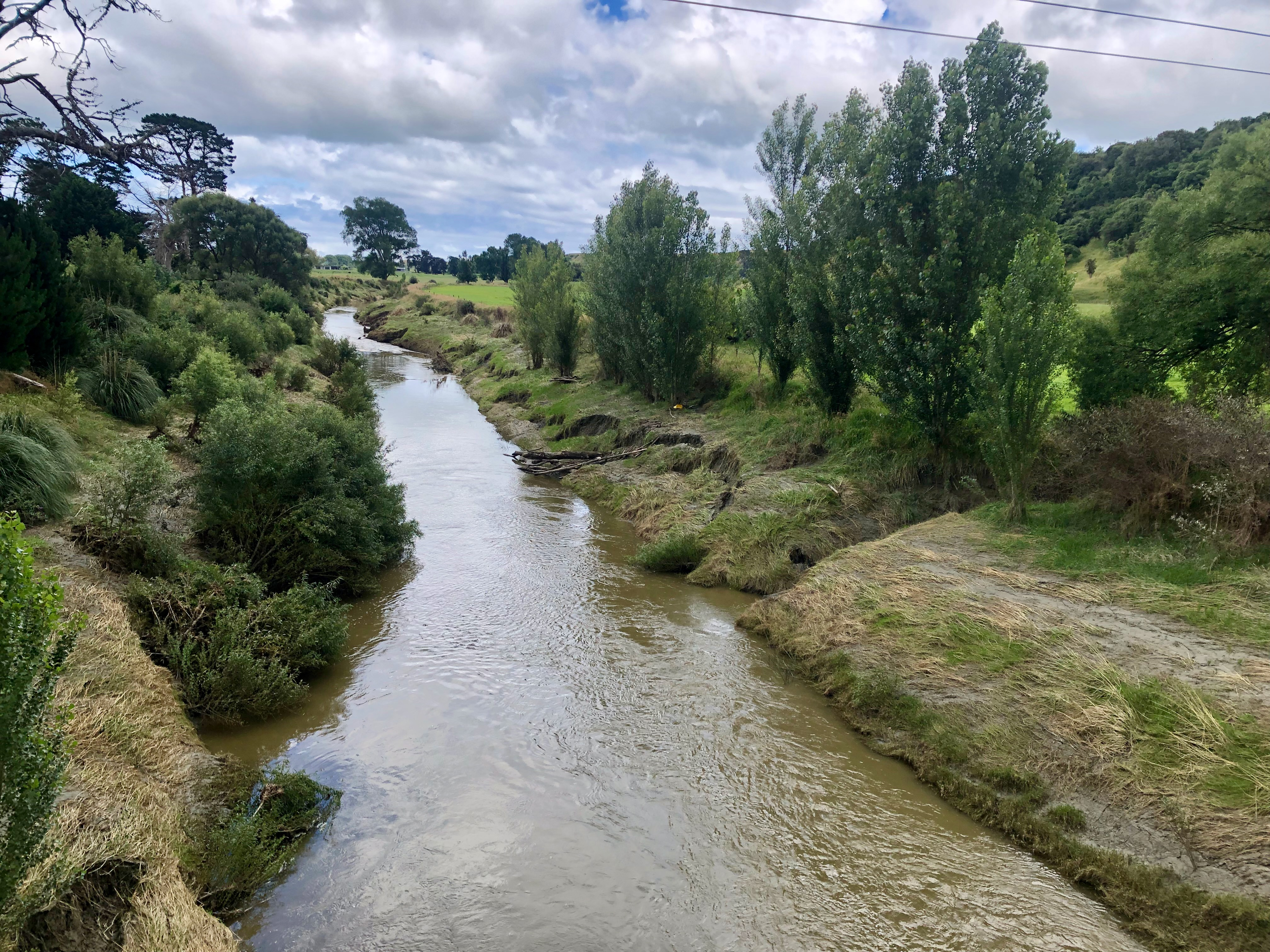
- Turakina River. looking south west from SH3 bridge, after 13 Dec 2021 flood
- Etymology: Māori meaning "tree felled across a river for a bridge"
- Native name: Turakina (Māori)

Location
- Country: New Zealand
- Region: Manawatū-Whanganui
- Settlements: Papanui Junction, Turakina, Koitiata

Physical characteristics
- Source: 5 km (3.1 mi) south west of Waiouru
  - coordinates: 39°31′0″S 175°37′57″E
  - elevation: 900 metres (3,000 ft)
- Mouth: Tasman Sea
  - location: Koitiata
  - coordinates: 40°03′58″S 175°07′35″E
  - elevation: Sea level
- Length: 137 kilometres (85 mi)
- Basin size: 962 square kilometres (371 sq mi)
- Discharge
  - average: 12,528 cubic metres (442,400 cu ft)/day

Basin features
- River system: Turakina River
- Tributaries
  - left: Mangapapa River

The Turakina River is a river of the southwestern North Island of New Zealand. It flows generally southwestward from its source south of Waiouru, roughly paralleling the larger Whangaehu River, and reaches the Tasman Sea 20 kilometres (12 mi) southeast of Whanganui.

The river flows near Papanui Junction and Turakina. Pā sites existed at Te Maire, Pukemata, Toakaituna, and Maipaua. Donald McLean arranged signing of the Rangitīkei–Turakina deed with some of the owners on 15 May 1849, when The Crown claimed the Rangitīkei Block. Scottish settlers arrived from the late 1860s.

Floods on the Turakina are frequent, including 1897, 1920, 1939, 1940, 2013, 2015, 2017 and 2021.

Te Araroa long-distance walkway crosses the river at the beach at Koitiata at low tide. The outlet of the river changes frequently, moving up to 4.5 km (3 mi) along the lagoon, which is formed by a sand bar. In 1997 an outlet was dug to reduce flooding.

12% of samples taken at the lagoon in 5 years to 2022 found E. coli levels too high for swimming. 81.1% of land in the catchment is used for animal grazing. Native bush covers only 8.5%.

Redfin bully live in the river.

Turakina Valley Road closely follows the river for 104 km (65 mi) between Tangiwai and Turakina. Much of it is a gravel road.

The river is crossed by SH3 and by the Marton–New Plymouth railway.
