= Elizabeth Gunn (paediatrician) =

New Zealand physician and child health administrator

Elizabeth Gunn MBE
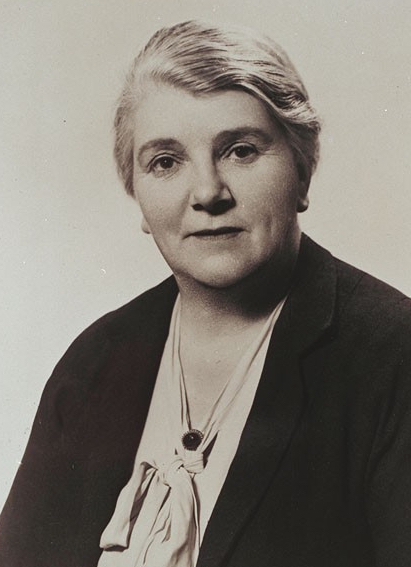
- Born: Elizabeth Catherine Gunn; 23 May 1879; Dunedin, New Zealand
- Died: 26 October 1963 (aged 84); Wellington, New Zealand
- Occupation: Paediatrician
- Years active: 1912–1940
- Known for: Establishing Children's Health Camp movement in New Zealand
- Medical career
- Profession: Doctor
- Field: Paediatrics

Elizabeth Catherine Gunn MBE (23 May 1879 – 26 October 1963) was a New Zealand school and army doctor and public health official. She was a pioneer in the field of children's health, and was instrumental in the establishment of children's health camps in New Zealand.

== Biography ==
Gunn was born in Dunedin, the daughter of an ironmonger whose interests in medicine led him to change career initially to pharmacy and then to dentistry. She attended Timaru and Otago Girls' High Schools, and from there went to the University of Otago. After a year at Otago she left for Scotland, completing her medical qualifications at Edinburgh Medical School in 1903, and then taking postgraduate studies in obstetrics at Trinity College Dublin.

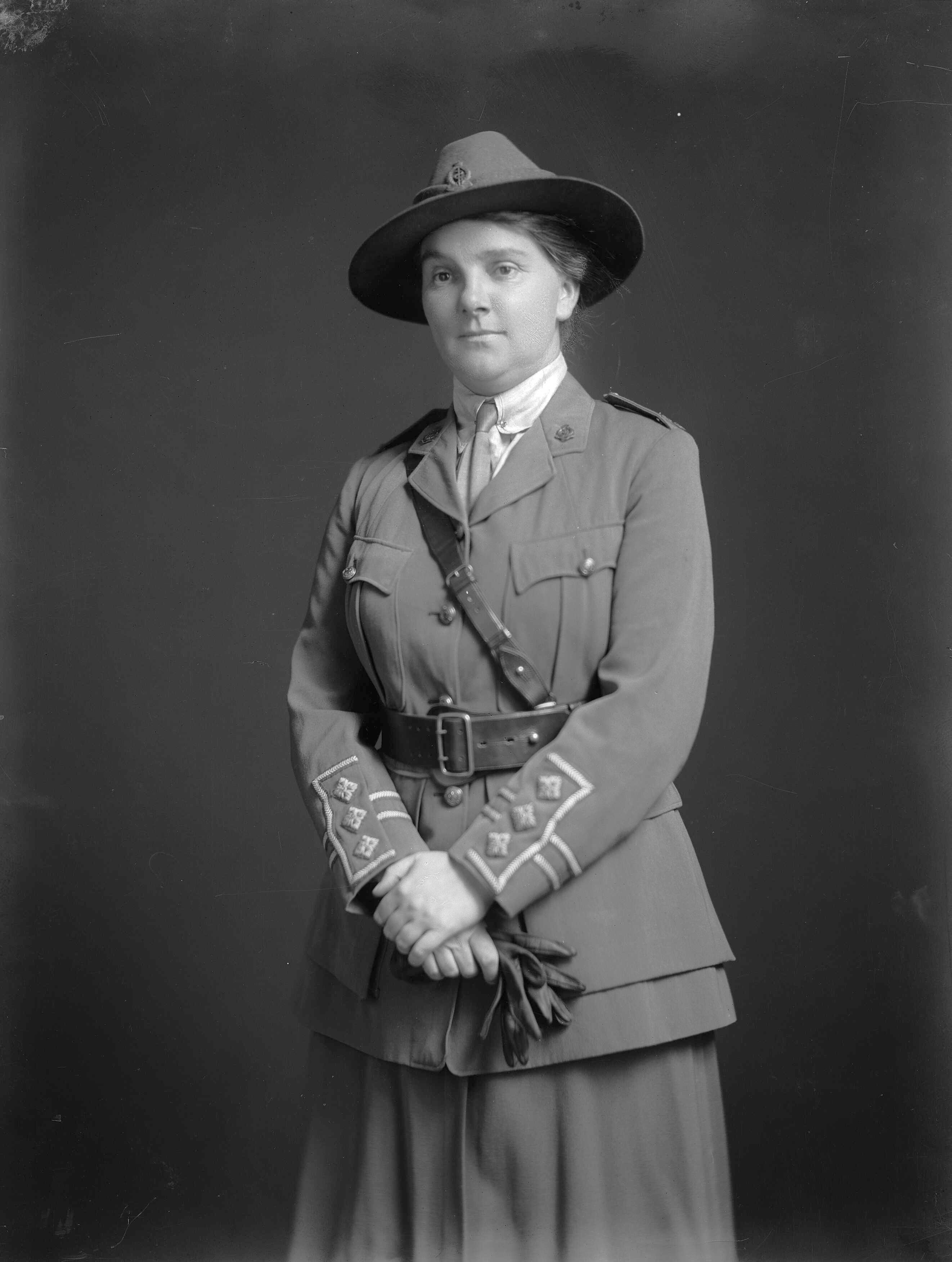
Gunn in uniform as a captain in the New Zealand Medical Corps, 1917

After completing her studies, Gunn returned to New Zealand, working as a general practitioner in Wellington before joining the school medical service in 1912. From 1915 to 1917, she was a captain in the New Zealand Medical Corps (NZMC), having succeeded in gaining admission to a predominantly male preserve by her formidable force of character: upon initially failing to gain admittance to the NZMC she took her case directly to Prime Minister William Massey, claiming that this snubbing was injurious to her reputation in medical circles. She served during World War I with the NZMC at Trentham, where she was the Medical Officer at Izard's Convalescent Home and then served as Medical Officer on the troopship Tahiti. On her return to new Zealand she continued to work at Trentham, but her own health suffered and she came down with a rheumatic condition.

During her convalescence Gunn travelled, ending up in Britain in 1917. Here she visited child welfare institutions, and became acutely aware of the problems of child malnutrition. On returning to New Zealand she rejoined the school medical service, serving in the southwestern North Island. During her time in this service, based at Wanganui, she became a much feared but much respected character. Gunn was infamous for her habit of removing children's loose or rotten teeth with a spatula. "The doctor is in the habit of removing portions of decayed teeth by means of the spatula used for depressing the tongue. The doctor refrained from doing this after I had protested" (George Kidson, Headmaster, Kilbirnie School, 6 July 1922).

Gunn's most notable contribution to children's health was the inauguration of the Children's Health Camp movement. Based on the system of open-air schools used in Britain to aid tuberculosis sufferers, Gunn proposed to Wanganui Hospital Board member B.P. Lethbridge that a simplified system of camps for malnourished children would improve child health. She and Lethbridge had a wager as to the success of such a scheme, and Gunn set about using her persuasive powers in gaining the necessary equipment to open a camp. In November 1919, 55 children arrived at Turakina to spend three weeks under the supervision of Gunn and a small group of school nurses and teacher trainees.

Gunn continued to personally organise and run camps throughout the 1920s, at Turakina and later at Awapuni, Palmerston North. Her last camp was held at Awapuni Racecourse in 1930. Camps were organised on a military-like schedule, creating an atmosphere that was somewhere between an open-air hospital and a scout camp. Other voluntary health camps started up, and in 1936, a National Federation of Health Camps was inaugurated, with permanent, year-round facilities and substantial government subsidies, some of these coming through the sale of health stamps, postage stamps with a set charity premium which went towards the running of the camps.

Between 1937 and 1940, Gunn served as director of the Health Department's Division of School Hygiene, succeeding Ada Gertrude Paterson. She retired from the Division of School Hygiene on 31 March 1940. After retiring from the post she continued to be interested and to work in the fields of child health and paediatrics. Gunn was appointed a Member of the Order of the British Empire in the 1951 King's Birthday Honours for her work in child health. Gunn died at Ranui rest home in Wellington on 26 October 1963.
