= Thomas Garland (broadcaster) =

New Zealand choirmaster (1877–1964)

Thomas Threader Garland MBE (7 February 1877 – 7 July 1964) was a New Zealand businessman, broadcaster, Methodist lay preacher and choirmaster. He was born in London, England, on 7 February 1877.

In the 1951 King's Birthday Honours, Garland was appointed a Member of the Order of the British Empire for services to the community, especially as a conductor of children's choirs. In 1953, he was awarded the Queen Elizabeth II Coronation Medal.
