= Elizabeth Gunn (author) =

American mystery writer (1927–2022)

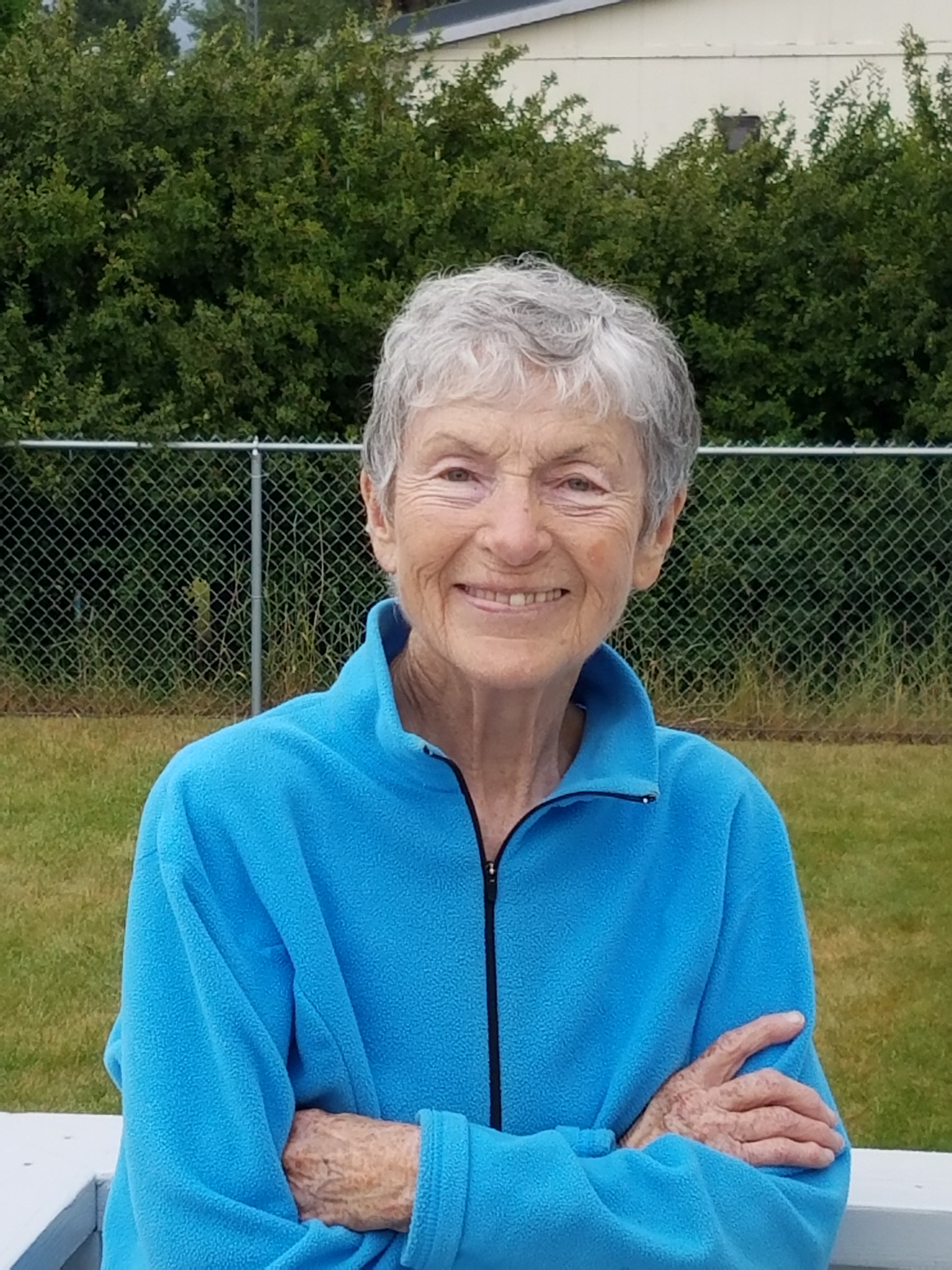
- Born: Elizabeth Anne McConnell; June 10, 1927; Chatfield, Minnesota, U.S.
- Died: August 30, 2022 (aged 95); Helena, Montana, U.S.
- Education: University of Minnesota (BA,1992))
- Occupation: Writer
- Writing career
- Language: English
- Period: c. 1995 – 2022
- Genres: Police procedural mystery; travel writing; short fiction

Elizabeth Anne Gunn (née McConnell; June 10, 1927 – August 30, 2022) was an American writer.

== Biography ==
Gunn was born in Chatfield, Minnesota on June 10, 1927, spent most of her writing career in Tucson, Arizona, and died in Helena, Montana on August 30, 2022. Her careful research into police techniques resulted in "precision-tooled procedurals" according to Marilyn Stasio of The New York Times. Her Jake Hines Series is set in the fictional city of Rutherford, Minnesota. Her Sarah Burke Series, is set in Tucson, where she moved in 1999. Her publishers included Walker, Dell, Harlequin, Forge, Severn House, and Joffe Books.

Prior to her career as a writer, Gunn was a runner, skier, earned her private pilot's license, became a sky and scuba diver, hiked deserts and mountains, and travelled extensively in the U.S., Canada, Mexico, and Europe, including several years as a live-aboard sailor. While she was sailing, Gunn began to write travel articles. Many were published in regional papers around the U.S. This was the beginning of her path to becoming a full-time writer. Her first novel was published when she was 70, her last two after she turned 90. Before "retiring" to her career as a writer, Gunn made her living as an innkeeper, in Helena, Montana, where she owned a motel with her husband, Phillip. Together they raised two daughters and the family lived in a small apartment directly above the lobby of their motel. As a result of those cramped quarters, Gunn developed her desire to travel.

== Works ==
=== The Jake Hines Mystery Series ===
The series features Jake Hines, a dumpster baby who survived a childhood of foster homes to become a detective with the Rutherford Police Department.

- Triple Play (1997)
- Par Four (1999)
- Five Card Stud (2000)
- Six-Pound Walleye (2001)
- Seventh-Inning Stretch (2002)
- Crazy Eights (2005)
- McCafferty's Nine (2007)
- The Ten-Mile Trials (2010)
- Eleven Little Piggies (2013)
- Noontime Follies (2015)

=== The Sarah Burke Mystery Series ===
Sarah Burke is a divorced homicide detective, and the protector of her substance-abusing sister's youthful daughter, Denny. Gunn chose the setting of Tucson because she viewed it as a rich resource. Tucson's proximity to the Mexican border allowed her to pursue the thriving drug corridor and people-smuggling operations typical of the community. Severn House published the Sarah Burke novels in matching trade paperbacks a few months after the hardcover.

In 2021, Gunn and Severn House jointly signed a new publication deal with Joffe Books to reissue the Sarah Burke series with new titles and new covers, in Kindle editions and trade paperbacks.

- Close to Her (2021), originally published as Cool in Tucson (2007)
- At Close Range (2022), originally published as New River Blues (2009) then as Rio Nuevo (2019)
- Too Close to Kill (2022), originally published as Kissing Arizona (2010)
- Close to Death (2022), originally published as The Magic Line (2012)
- Closing Ranks (2022), originally published as Red Man Down (2014)
- Close to Home (2022), originally published as Denny's Law (2016)
- Close to the Edge (2022), originally published as Sarah's List (2020)

=== Stand-alone mysteries ===
- Burning Meredith: A mystery set in Montana (2018)

=== Anthology contributions ===
- "Too Many Santas" in How Still We See Thee Lie (2002)
- "The Butler Did It" in Fifteen Tales of Murder, Mayhem, and Malice (2012)

=== Short fiction e-books ===
Gunn was an early adopter of the e-book format, publishing her Jake Hines backlist as Kindle novels almost as soon as that format became available. In addition, she has published a few pieces of short fiction as standalone ebooks:

- Runaway (2011)
- The Fountain (2011)
- Math (2011)
- Too Many Santas (2011)
