= Turakina, New Zealand =

Settlement in New Zealand

Turakina
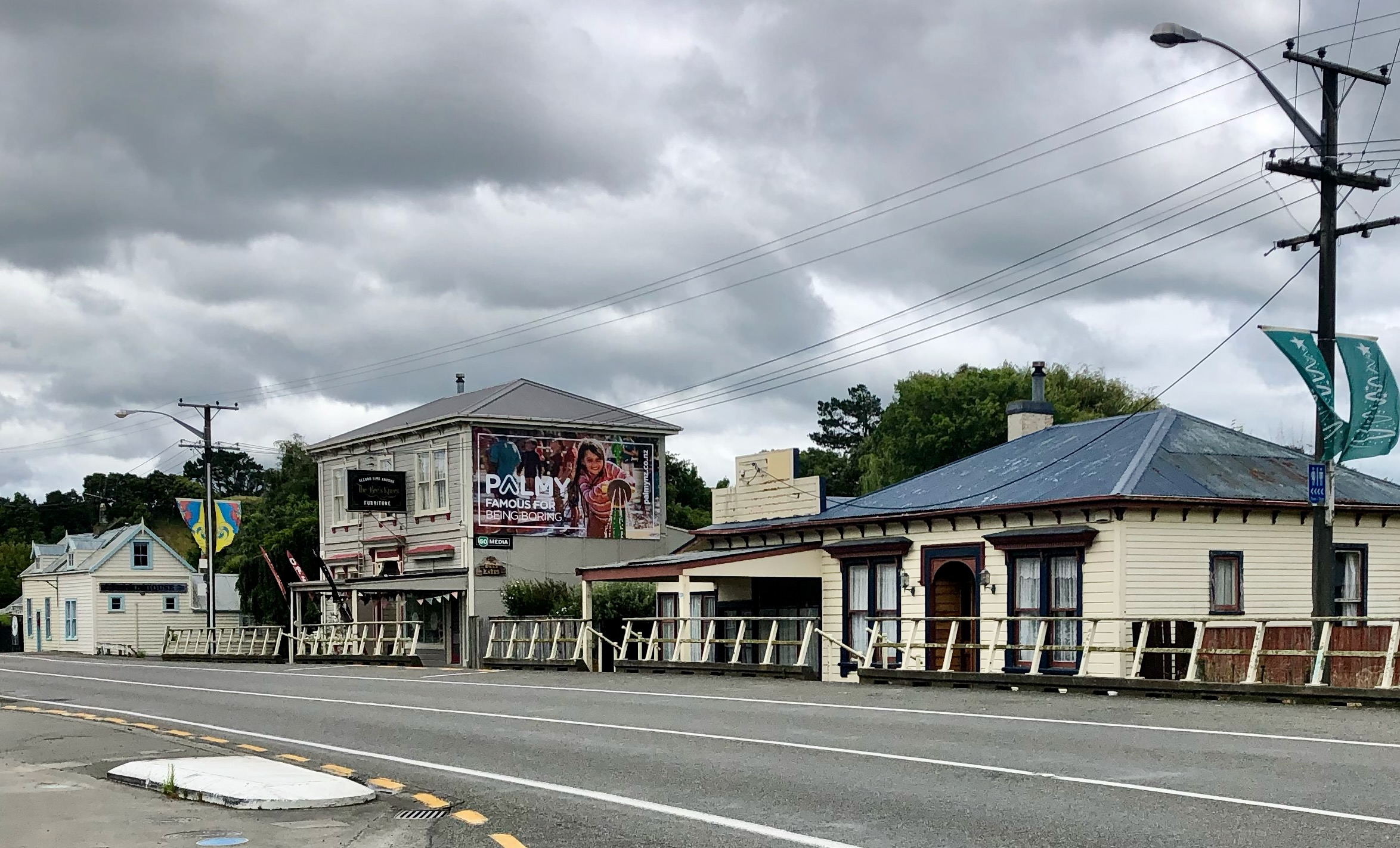
- Interactive map of Turakina
- Coordinates: 40°02′S 175°13′E}
- Country: New Zealand
- Region: Manawatū-Whanganui
- District: Rangitikei District
- Wards: Southern General Ward; Tiikeitia ki Uta (Inland) Māori Ward
- Electorates: Rangitīkei; Te Tai Hauāuru (Māori)

Government
  - Territorial Authority: Rangitikei District Council
  - Regional council: Horizons Regional Council
  - Mayor of Rangitikei: Andy Watson
  - Rangitīkei MP: Suze Redmayne
  - Te Tai Hauāuru MP: Debbie Ngarewa-Packer

Area
  - Total: 4.96 km^{2} (1.92 sq mi)

Population (2023 Census)
  - Total: 132
  - Density: 26.6/km^{2} (68.9/sq mi)

Turakina is an old Māori settlement situated southeast of Whanganui city on the North Island of New Zealand. Turakina village derives its name from the Turakina River, which cut its passage to the sea from a source south of Waiouru.

Turakina is notable as the site of the first of New Zealand's children's health camp, established by Elizabeth Gunn in November 1919.

== History and culture ==
=== Pre-European history ===
The original inhabitants of the area were the descendants of the Kahui Rere and the Kahui Maunga, later naming themselves Ngā Wairiki. However, after the migration of Ngāti Apa from the Bay of Plenty toward Rotoaira then south to the Rangitikei river, they found themselves slowly being taken over by generations of intermarriage with the latter tribe.

The hapū of Ngā Āriki still live in Turakina.

=== European settlement ===
Scottish settlers arrived in the area in the 19th century, and their descendants still live there to the present day. Many Māori families intermarried with the Scottish also.

Celtic feeling is still strong in Turakina. For example, Highland games are held every year late January, attracting many from around New Zealand.

=== Marae ===
The local Tini Waitara Marae and Te Horo Taraipi meeting house is a traditional meeting place of Ngāti Apa.

== Demographics ==
Turakina locality covers 4.96 km^{2} (1.92 sq mi). It is part of the larger Turakina statistical area.

Historical population for Turakina locality
Year	Pop.	±% p.a.
2006	147	—
2013	108	−4.31%
2018	99	−1.73%
2023	132	+5.92%

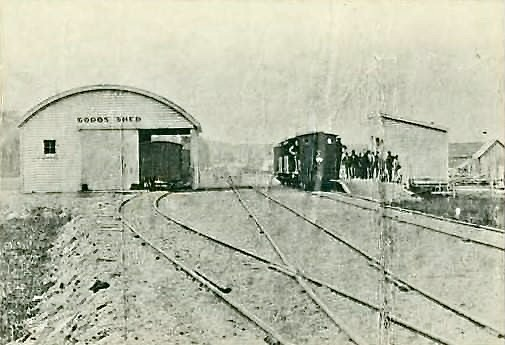
First passenger train from Aramoho to Turakina on 17 May 1877

Turakina had a population of 132 in the 2023 New Zealand census, an increase of 33 people (33.3%) since the 2018 census, and an increase of 24 people (22.2%) since the 2013 census. There were 69 males and 63 females in 57 dwellings. 2.3% of people identified as LGBTIQ+. The median age was 53.0 years (compared with 38.1 years nationally). There were 21 people (15.9%) aged under 15 years, 12 (9.1%) aged 15 to 29, 69 (52.3%) aged 30 to 64, and 27 (20.5%) aged 65 or older.

People could identify as more than one ethnicity. The results were 75.0% European (Pākehā), 25.0% Māori, 4.5% Asian, and 4.5% other, which includes people giving their ethnicity as "New Zealander". English was spoken by 95.5%, Māori by 6.8%, and other languages by 4.5%. No language could be spoken by 2.3% (e.g. too young to talk). The percentage of people born overseas was 11.4, compared with 28.8% nationally.

Religious affiliations were 31.8% Christian, 4.5% Hindu, 6.8% Māori religious beliefs, and 2.3% New Age. People who answered that they had no religion were 45.5%, and 13.6% of people did not answer the census question.

Of those at least 15 years old, 21 (18.9%) people had a bachelor's or higher degree, 60 (54.1%) had a post-high school certificate or diploma, and 33 (29.7%) people exclusively held high school qualifications. The median income was $38,500, compared with $41,500 nationally. 9 people (8.1%) earned over $100,000 compared to 12.1% nationally. The employment status of those at least 15 was 54 (48.6%) full-time, 18 (16.2%) part-time, and 6 (5.4%) unemployed.

=== Turakina statistical area ===
Turakina statistical area, which also includes Koitiata, Rātana Pā and Whangaehu, covers 276.62 km^{2} (106.80 sq mi) and had an estimated population of 1,400 as of June 2025, with a population density of 5.1 people per km^{2}.

Historical population for the statistical area
Year	Pop.	±% p.a.
2006	1,260	—
2013	1,236	−0.27%
2018	1,254	+0.29%
2023	1,362	+1.67%

Turakina had a population of 1,362 in the 2023 New Zealand census, an increase of 108 people (8.6%) since the 2018 census, and an increase of 126 people (10.2%) since the 2013 census. There were 678 males, 681 females, and 3 people of other genders in 501 dwellings. 2.4% of people identified as LGBTIQ+. The median age was 43.2 years (compared with 38.1 years nationally). There were 270 people (19.8%) aged under 15 years, 207 (15.2%) aged 15 to 29, 654 (48.0%) aged 30 to 64, and 231 (17.0%) aged 65 or older.

People could identify as more than one ethnicity. The results were 66.1% European (Pākehā); 40.3% Māori; 2.4% Pasifika; 2.4% Asian; 0.2% Middle Eastern, Latin American and African New Zealanders (MELAA); and 1.8% other, which includes people giving their ethnicity as "New Zealander". English was spoken by 96.0%, Māori by 14.8%, Samoan by 0.9%, and other languages by 3.3%. No language could be spoken by 2.6% (e.g. too young to talk). New Zealand Sign Language was known by 0.9%. The percentage of people born overseas was 7.7, compared with 28.8% nationally.

Religious affiliations were 28.9% Christian, 0.4% Hindu, 0.2% Islam, 25.8% Māori religious beliefs, 0.4% New Age, and 0.2% Jewish. People who answered that they had no religion were 37.2%, and 7.3% of people did not answer the census question.

Of those at least 15 years old, 168 (15.4%) people had a bachelor's or higher degree, 627 (57.4%) had a post-high school certificate or diploma, and 297 (27.2%) people exclusively held high school qualifications. The median income was $36,700, compared with $41,500 nationally. 87 people (8.0%) earned over $100,000 compared to 12.1% nationally. The employment status of those at least 15 was 555 (50.8%) full-time, 162 (14.8%) part-time, and 36 (3.3%) unemployed.

== Education ==
Turakina School is a co-educational state primary school for Year 1 to 8 students, with a roll of 30 as of July 2026. While a primary school was founded in Turakina in 1857, the school celebrated its centenary in 1959.

Turakina Māori Girls' College was established at Turakina in 1905. It moved to Marton in 1927, and closed in 2016.
