= Koitiata =

Settlement in Manawatū-Whanganui Region, New Zealand

- Settlement
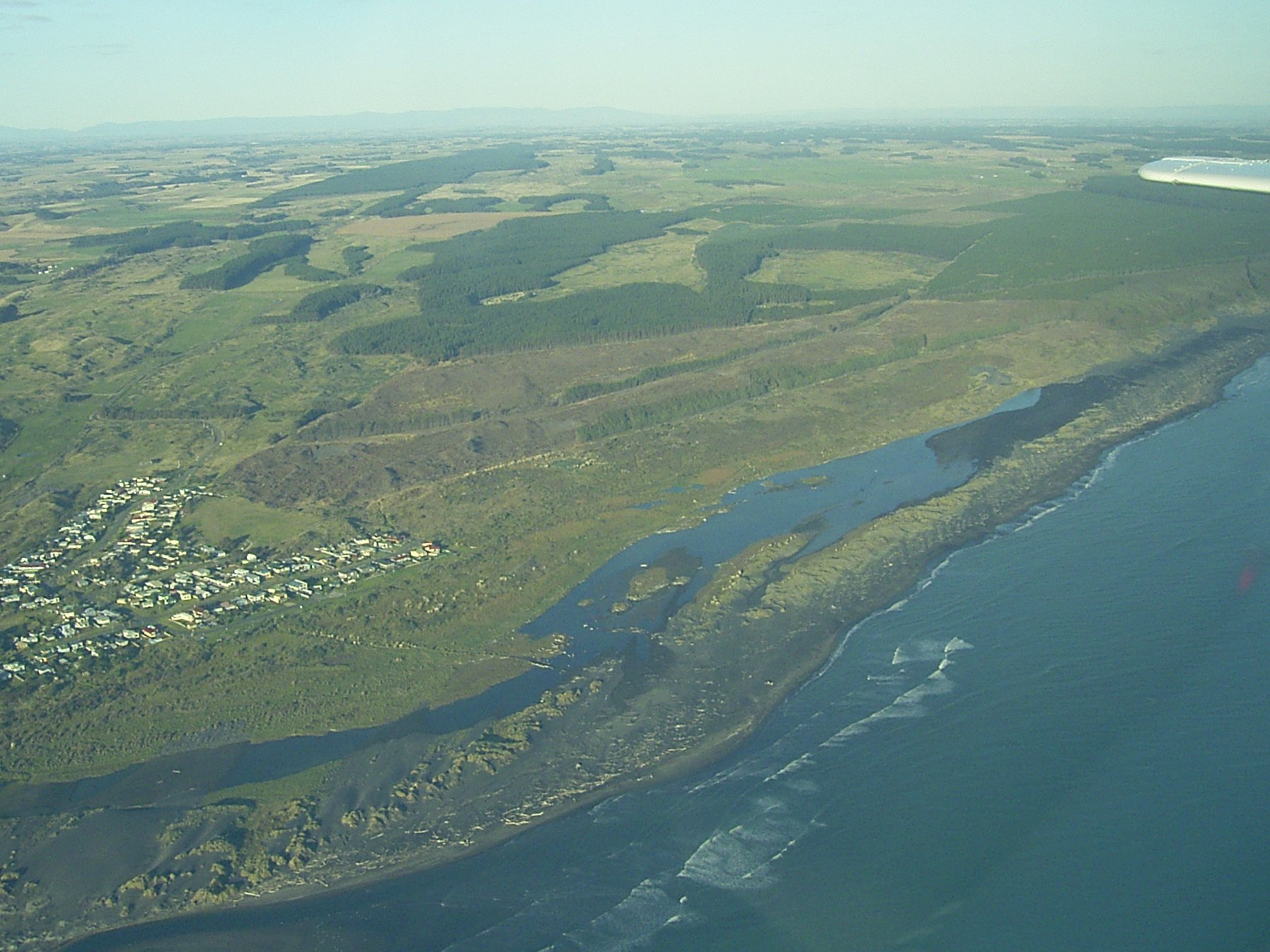
- Interactive map of Koitiata
- Coordinates: 40°04′28″S 175°08′23″E
- Country: New Zealand
- Region: Manawatū-Whanganui
- District: Rangitikei District
- Wards: Southern General Ward; Tiikeitia ki Uta (Inland) Māori Ward
- Electorates: Rangitīkei; Te Tai Hauāuru (Māori)

Government
  - Territorial Authority: Rangitikei District Council
  - Regional council: Horizons Regional Council
  - Mayor of Rangitikei: Andy Watson
  - Rangitīkei MP: Suze Redmayne
  - Te Tai Hauāuru MP: Debbie Ngarewa-Packer

Area
  - Total: 0.21 km^{2} (0.081 sq mi)

Population (June 2025)
  - Total: 140
  - Density: 670/km^{2} (1,700/sq mi)
- Website: www.koitiata.nz

Koitiata is a settlement located in the southwestern part of Rangitikei District of the Manawatū-Whanganui region of New Zealand's North Island. At the time of the 2018 census, Koitiata had a population of 126. Marton is located 24 km to the east and Whanganui is located 29 km to the northwest. Nearby Koitiata is Lake Koitiata.

== Government and politics ==
=== Local government ===
As part of the Rangitikei District, the current Mayor of Rangitikei since 2013 is Andy Watson.

Koitiata forms part of the Southern ward of the Rangitikei District Council, which elects two of the eleven district councillors.

=== National government ===
Koitiata, like the rest of the Rangitikei District, is located in the general electorate of Rangitīkei and in the Māori electorate of Te Tai Hauāuru. Rangitīkei is a safe National Party seat since the 1938 election with the exception of 1978–1984 when it was held by Bruce Beetham of the Social Credit Party. Since 2011 it is held by Ian McKelvie.

Te Tai Hauāuru is a more volatile seat, having been held by three different parties since 1996, i.e. New Zealand First, Te Pāti Māori and the Labour Party.

== Education ==
The nearest primary school is Turakina School in Turakina and the nearest secondary schools are in Whanganui and Marton.

== Demographics ==
Koitiata is described by Statistics New Zealand as a rural settlement. It covers 0.21 km^{2} (0.081 sq mi) and had an estimated population of 140 as of June 2025, with a population density of 667 people per km^{2}. It is part of the larger Turakina statistical area.

Historical population
| Year | Pop. | ±% p.a. |
|---|---|---|
| 2001 | 114 | — |
| 2006 | 93 | −3.99% |
| 2013 | 108 | +2.16% |
| 2018 | 126 | +3.13% |
| 2023 | 144 | +2.71% |

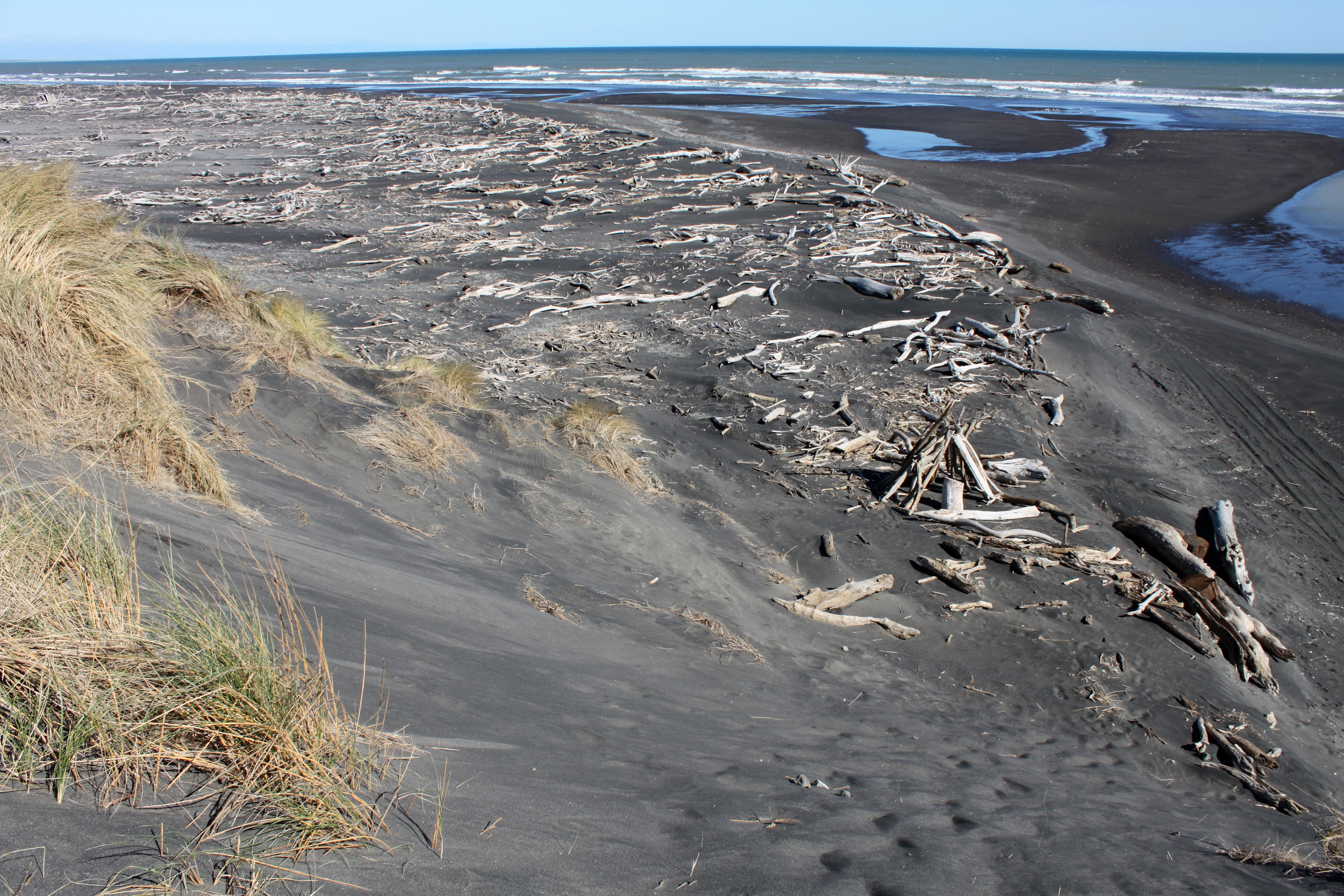
Beach at Koitiata

Koitiata had a population of 144 in the 2023 New Zealand census, an increase of 18 people (14.3%) since the 2018 census, and an increase of 36 people (33.3%) since the 2013 census. There were 75 males and 69 females in 75 dwellings. 6.2% of people identified as LGBTIQ+. The median age was 58.6 years (compared with 38.1 years nationally). There were 6 people (4.2%) aged under 15 years, 9 (6.2%) aged 15 to 29, 81 (56.2%) aged 30 to 64, and 42 (29.2%) aged 65 or older.

People could identify as more than one ethnicity. The results were 93.8% European (Pākehā), 12.5% Māori, 2.1% Asian, and 4.2% other, which includes people giving their ethnicity as "New Zealander". English was spoken by 97.9%, Māori by 2.1%, and other languages by 2.1%. New Zealand Sign Language was known by 4.2%. The percentage of people born overseas was 6.2, compared with 28.8% nationally.

Religious affiliations were 29.2% Christian, 2.1% Islam, and 2.1% Māori religious beliefs. People who answered that they had no religion were 58.3%, and 10.4% of people did not answer the census question.

Of those at least 15 years old, 21 (15.2%) people had a bachelor's or higher degree, 69 (50.0%) had a post-high school certificate or diploma, and 39 (28.3%) people exclusively held high school qualifications. The median income was $30,900, compared with $41,500 nationally. 6 people (4.3%) earned over $100,000 compared to 12.1% nationally. The employment status of those at least 15 was 51 (37.0%) full-time, 21 (15.2%) part-time, and 3 (2.2%) unemployed.

== Transport ==
State Highway 3 is located 8 km to the northeast of Koitiata. This national state highway connects Woodville (25 km east of Palmerston North) and Hamilton via New Plymouth.

The nearest airport is Whanganui Airport, located 30 km to the northwest of the town.

== Fusilier shipwreck ==
About 8 km (5.0 mi) south of Koitiata the 404 ton, iron barque, Fusilier, was blown onto the coast on 16 January 1884. She was 24 years old and had been sailing in ballast from Wellington to Adelaide. Attempts to refloat her were abandoned The Fusilier is now in the sand dunes, about 200 yd (180 m) from the highest tides.
