= Timeline of Māori battles =

This is a timeline of battles involving Māori people in New Zealand.

== Pre-colonial time (c. 1350 to 1839) ==
=== 16th century ===
- Ngāti Hotu suffered a major defeat at the battle of Pukekaikiore ('hill of the meal of rats') to the southwest of Lake Taupō where Ngāti Tūwharetoa devastated them, causing the few survivors to flee.
- The battle of the five forts at Kakahi: The Ngāti Hotu set up a ring of five forts around Kakahi which the Whanganui Māori attacked and took one by one until finally the last two, Otutaarua and Arikipakewa, fell. The final, brutal episode of the battle was played out on the flats between Kakahi and the Whanganui river.

=== 17th century ===
- 1642, Dec: Four of Tasman's crew are killed at Wharewharangi (Murderers) Bay by a Ngāti Tūmatakōkiri war party. Tasman's ships are approached by 11 waka as he leaves and his ships fire on them, hitting a Māori standing in one of the waka. Tasman's ships depart without landing. The Dutch chart the west of the North Island.

=== 18th century ===
- c. 1741, Te-Rangi-hinganga-tahi ("the day when all fell together"), also known as The Battle of Paruroa. The battle near Parau in the lower Waitākere Ranges, where paramount chief of Waiohua, Kiwi Tāmaki, was defeated by the Te Taoū hapū of Ngāti Whātua, led by Waha-akiaki, Tūperiri and Waitaheke. This battle signified the end of Waiohua hegemony in the Auckland isthmus.
- c. 1740s: the final major battle between Ngāti Whātua and Waiohua at Māngere Mountain. The few regrouped Waiohua forces, led by Mahitokotoko and Mahikourona, scattered shells around the base of the pā on top of Māngere Mountain, to warn the warriors of any invading forces. A Ngāti Whātua war party led by Tūperiri attacked the pā by stealth, by placing tōpuni (dog skin cloaks) on top, to muffle the sounds of the shells. After the battle, Tūperiri began to settle central Tāmaki Makaurau, leading to the birth of Ngāti Whātua-o-Ōrākei. The names Te Ara Tōpuni or Te Ara Pūeru ("the road of cloaks") can refer to this battle, or describe the site on Māngere Mountain where the battle occurred.
- 1772, 12 Jun: Marion du Fresne is killed at Tacoury's Cove, Bay of Islands by local Māori.
- 1773, 18 Dec: A skirmish at Grass Cove in Queen Charlotte Sound results in the deaths of two Māori and nine members of Cook's expedition.
- Late 1700s: Tūhuru, chief of Ngāti Waewae (a hapu of Ngāi Tahu) defeats Ngāti Wairangi in a battle at Kōtukuwhakaoho (Stillwater, West Coast), securing Ngāi Tahu control over pounamu on the West Coast.

=== 19th century pre-1839 ===
- c. 1807: The Battle of Hingakaka (sometimes called Hiringakaka) was fought between two Māori armies, an allied southern North Island army and a Tainui alliance army, near Ōhaupō in the Waikato, and was reputedly "the largest battle ever fought on New Zealand soil" – so many chiefs died that it is known as Hingakaka (the fall of parrots).
- 1807–1845: The Musket Wars were a series of three thousand or more battles and raids fought in New Zealand and the Chatham Islands amongst Māori between 1807 and 1845, after Māori obtained muskets.
  - 1807 or 1808: Ngāpuhi fight Ngāti Whātua, Te Uri-o-Hau and Te Roroa iwi at the battle of Moremonui on the west coast of Northland, the first battle in which Māori used muskets.
  - 1821: Battle of Okoki with Potatau Te Wherowhero. Te Hiakai was shot in the battle.
  - 1825: The battle of Te Ika-a-ranganui between Ngapuhi and hapu against Ngatiwhatua, resident occupiers of the land fought upon. It was a battle of utu.
- c. 1810s: Ngāi Tahu defeats Ngāti Tūmatakōkiri in a battle at Kōtukuwhakaoho (Stillwater, West Coast), at which Tūhuru, chief of Ngāti Waewae, kills the paramount chiefs of Ngāti Tūmatakōkiri, Te Pau and Te Kokihi, leaving Ngāti Tūmatakōkiri lands in the north-west South Island to be divided between Ngāi Tahu, Ngāti Apa and Ngāti Kuia.

== Post-colonial time (1839–1872) ==
=== 19th century post-1839 ===
- New Zealand Wars
  - 1842, Jun 17: Wairau Affray
  - 1845, Mar 11: Flagstaff War
  - The Battle of Ohaeawai was fought between British forces and local Māori during the Flagstaff War in July 1845 at Ohaeawai.
  - c. 1846, May: Hutt Valley Campaign
    - 1846, Aug 6–13: Battle of Battle Hill. British troops, local militia and kūpapa pursued a Ngāti Toa force led by chief Te Rangihaeata through steep and dense bushland.
  - 1847, Apr 16: Wanganui Campaign
  - 1860, Mar to 1861, Mar: First Taranaki War
  - 1863, Jul to 1864, Apr: Invasion of the Waikato
    - 1863, Nov 20–21: The Battle of Rangiriri was a major engagement in the invasion of Waikato. More than 1400 British troops defeated about 500 warriors of the Kingitanga (Māori King Movement).
  - 1864: War in the Waikato ends with battle of Ōrākau.
  - 1864: The Ohura Fight of 1864 - "This was probably the last purely Maori apart from European organisation in New Zealand" - The Journal of the Polynesian Society – Vol. 35
  - 1864, Apr 29: Tauranga Campaign
  - 1863, May 4: Second Taranaki War
  - 1865, April to 1866, Oct: East Cape War
  - 1868, Jun to 1869, Mar: Titokowaru's War
  - 1868, Jul to 1872, May: Te Kooti's War
