= Ngāti Wairangi =

Ngāti Wairangi may refer to:

- Ngāti Wairangi (South Island iwi), a historical iwi of the West Coast of New Zealand; see Timeline of Māori battles
- Ngāti Wairangi, a subtribe of Ngāti Raukawa, based at Mōkai and Waiwharangi
