= Taupō railway proposals =

Proposals in Taupō, New Zealand

There have been a number of proposals to build a Taupō railway line as a branch railway linking the township of Taupō in the central North Island of New Zealand to New Zealand's rail network. One proposal proceeded as far as the construction stage before being stopped.

== Background ==
By 1952, nearly every main centre in New Zealand was served by a railway, the exceptions being Kaitaia, Queenstown and Taupō. Taupō is one of New Zealand's biggest forestry centres and is a very popular tourist destination.

== Proposed routes ==
=== North Island Main Trunk line ===
The first time consideration was made to link Taupō with a railway was in 1884 when routes for extending the North Island Main Trunk (NIMT) railway south from Te Awamutu to Wellington were being explored and surveyed. One of the proposed routes was from just south of Te Awamutu following the course of the Puniu River inland through to Taupō, and onwards east to link at Hastings with the proposed Palmerston North - Gisborne Line. This route did not eventuate and the present route via Taumarunui was chosen.

=== Taupo Totara Timber Company Railway ===
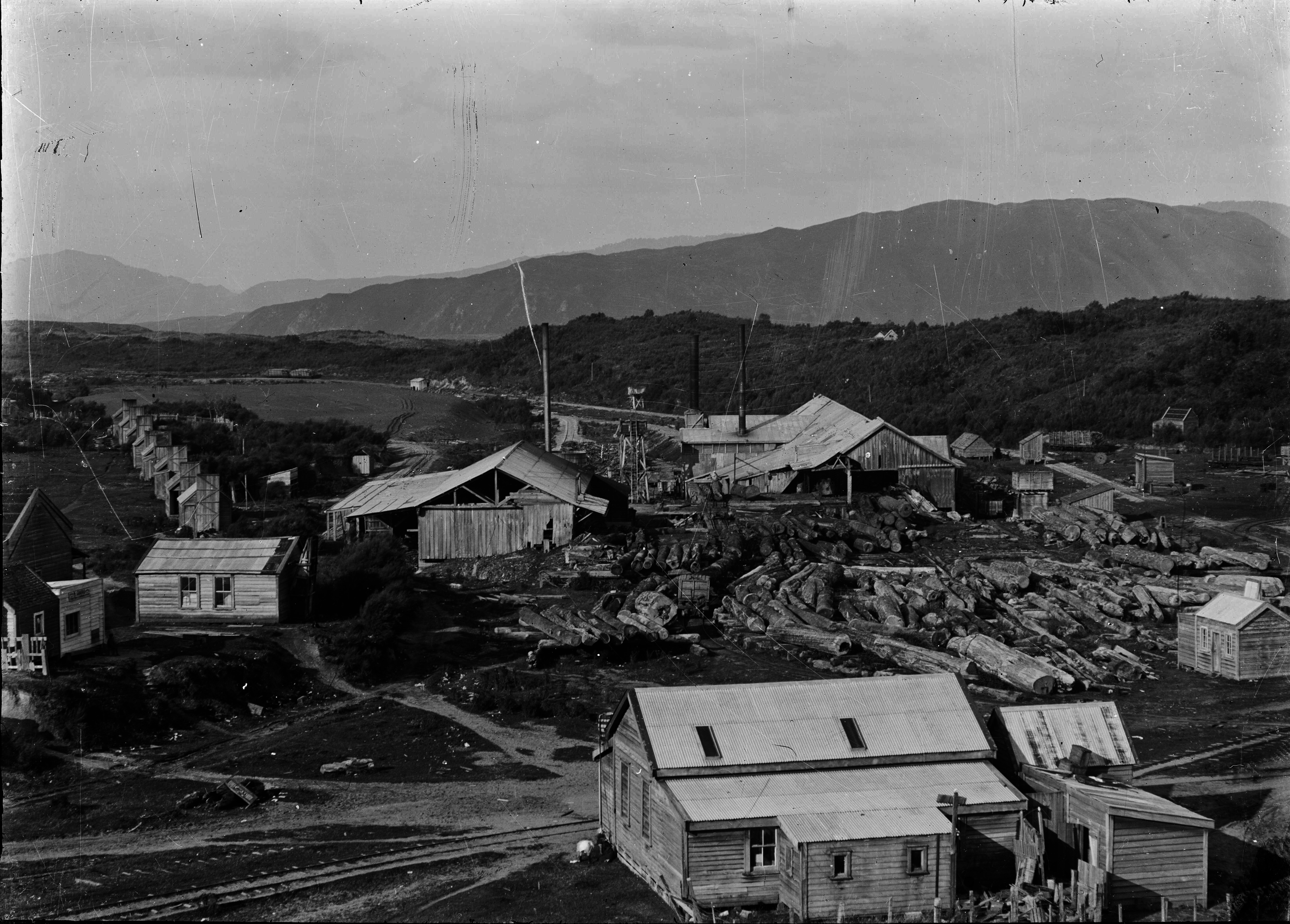
Taupo Totara Timber Company sawmill at Mokai

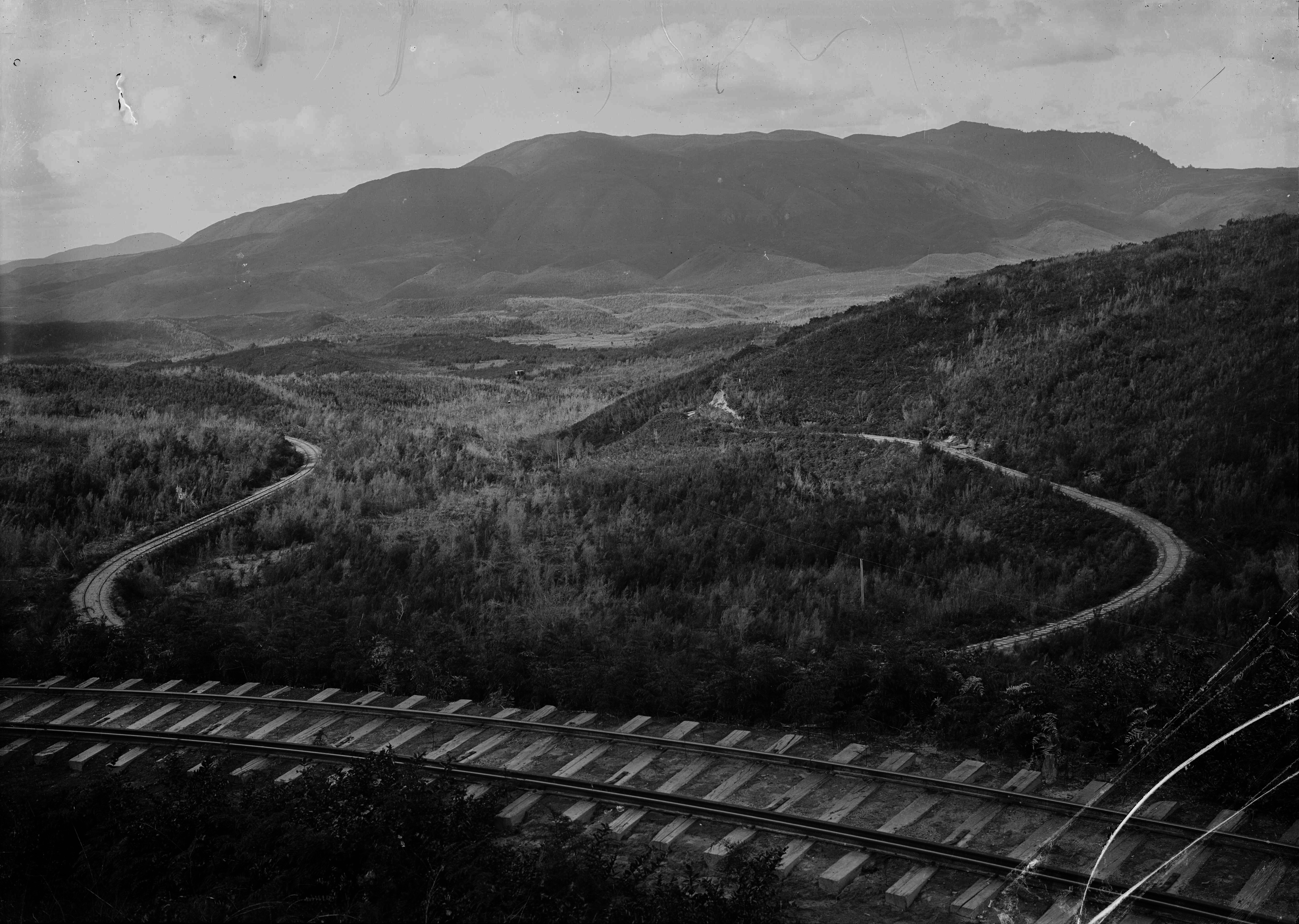
Railway line of the Taupo Totara Timber Company showing "the corkscrew", with five different levels

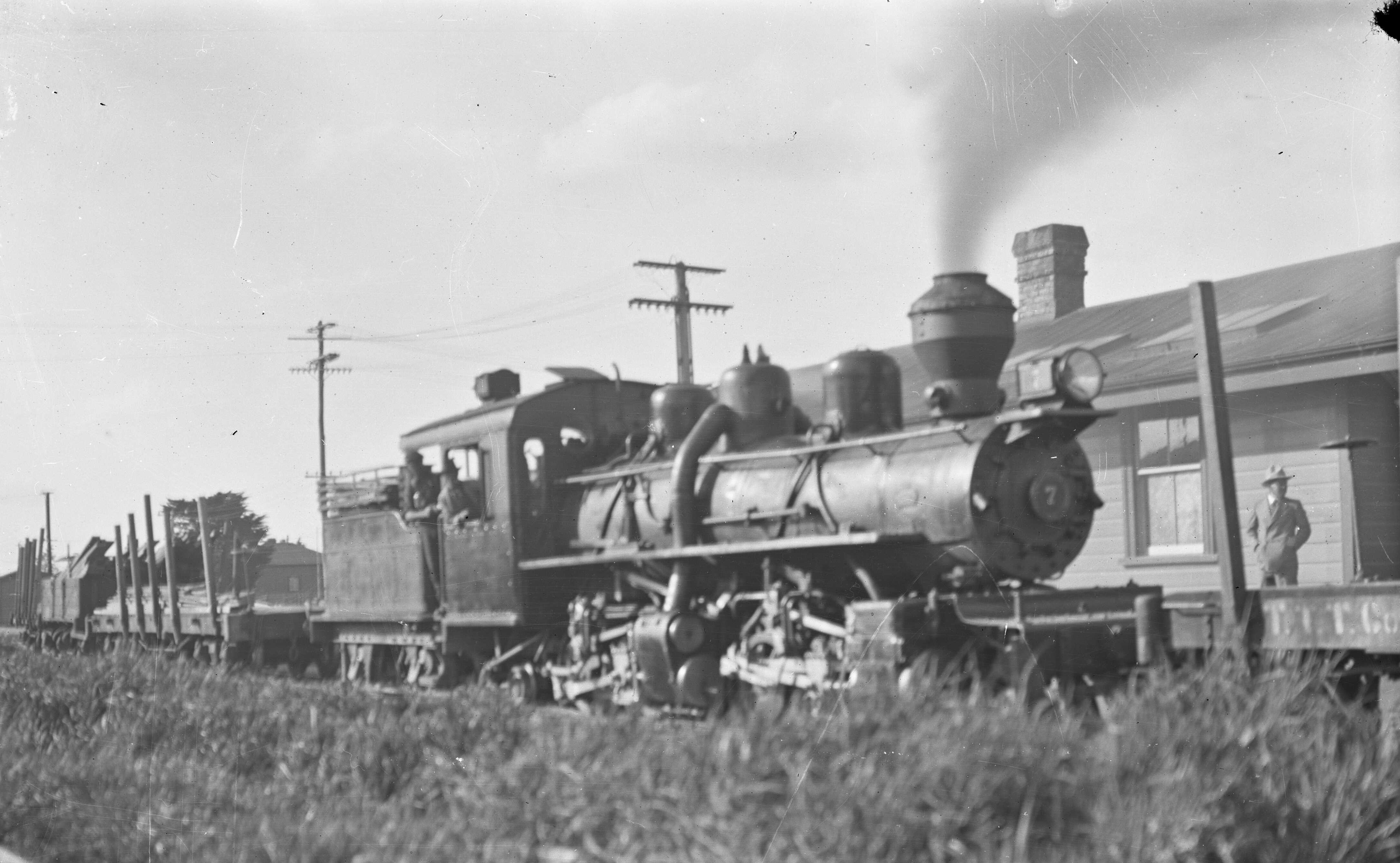
ALCO mallett steam locomotive No 7

In 1903 the Taupo Totara Timber Company (TTT Co) built the 82 kilometres (51 mi) Taupo Totara Timber Company railway to link their milling centre at Mokai with the New Zealand Government Railways line (NZR) at Putāruru. The line was built over the former Lichfield Branch line, which was originally built by the Thames Valley and Rotorua Railway Company to be part of the line to Rotorua. The TTT Co line then went onwards south of Lichfield through what is now Tokoroa and Kinleith and crossed the Waikato River at Ongaroto.

The TTT Co line was constructed as a contour railway, with tight curves designed for later alignment improvement and a ruling grade of 1 in 35. Some TTT directors hoped the railway might help "open up the district" for settlement.

In 1911 the TTT Co put forward a proposal to extend their line from Mokai into Taupō township via Oruanui. The station, and terminus of the line, were to be on Spa Road where Taupo-nui-a-Tia College now stands. This would have required another bridge across the Waikato River.

The proposal was quickly endorsed and praised by many in Taupō, and to support the extension the Taupo District Railway League was formed with powers to support the scheme and ensure it succeeded. The TTT Co proposed running the railway as a private trust-owned company.

However, considerable objection was made to this proposal by the people of Rotorua, particularly the Rotorua Chamber of Commerce. They believed that any railway to Taupō should be from the railhead at Rotorua, running south via Waiotapu. The Rotorua Chamber of Commerce lodged a complaint to Parliament regarding the proposal. The Taupo District Railway League consequently lodged a complaint to the Member of Parliament for the district, Mr MacDonald, protesting the opposition being made by the Rotorua Chamber of Commerce.

As time passed, the proposal for the TTT Co scheme was eventually shelved, largely due to the outbreak of World War I and the considerable objections made by the Rotorua Chamber of Commerce. The line would have required considerable improvements to bring it up to NZR standard as it was only built to carry timber and it consequently had very tight curves, narrow cuttings and light rails. It was not a fast railway line at all and the passengers that the TTT Co trains carried were noted to be able to climb off the train and walk alongside the train as it slowly crawled along.

The TTT Co line eventually closed on 26 October 1944. The Government saw that the line had greater potential and in September 1946 acquired the first 29 km between Putāruru and Kinleith. This section of line opened again on 9 June 1947 under the control of the Public Works Department using steam locomotives purchased from the TTT Co.

Around the same time plans were being made for a large pulp and paper mill to be constructed at Kinleith. The line with its sharp curves, steep grades and light rails, needed to be significantly upgraded to enable heavy traffic. Reconstruction of the line began in 1949, reducing grades from 1 in 44 to 1 in 70 and curves from a 201-metre radius to 322-metre radius. The rebuilt line was handed over to NZR on 12 June 1950.

Around this time there was a proposal to rebuild the line and extend it to Taupō. Nothing further was heard of this proposal after the 1949 election. This proposal has been brought up many times since.

=== 1980 Kinleith-Taupō line ===
In 1980 NZR investigated four possible routes for an extension of the Kinleith Branch to Taupō. The principal route ran south from the railhead at Kinleith following a route similar to State Highway 1 through to Atiamuri, then followed the western side of the Waikato River through Ohakuri and Orakei Korako to Aratiatia, where the line would cross the river over the rapids, before descending in an arc like curve heading north, then south in the vicinity of View Road and Broadlands Road, to terminate at the Fletchers Taupō Mill on Centennial Drive.

=== Rotorua–Taupō line ===
Proposals to link Taupō with Rotorua and the greater Bay of Plenty with a railway date back to 1911. It had long been intended that the Rotorua Branch would be extended into the Bay of Plenty to connect with the line being built from Gisborne. A railway into the Bay of Plenty would link Rotorua and surrounding regions to the Port of Tauranga. Rotorua interests at the time lobbied very hard to have a line built between Rotorua and the Bay of Plenty, claiming the considerable amounts of land that would be opened up and linked to the port, particularly if the line were to be extended to Taupō.

When the TTT Co announced a proposal in 1911 to extend its line running from Putāruru to Mokai into Taupō, this caused much upset in Rotorua, as it weakened Rotorua's case to have a line built to link Rotorua with the Port of Tauranga. The Rotorua Chamber of Commence consequently voiced strong opposition to the TTT Co proposal, and said that "any railway connection to Taupō should be from the Government railway at Rotorua".

The Government however was more focused on completing the East Coast Main Trunk Railway linking Tauranga and Gisborne, and would not consider linking Rotorua to the Bay of Plenty until that line was completed. The outbreak of World War I temporarily put a stop to the Rotorua proposal but once the war was over, enthusiasm for a line to link Rotorua and Taupō with the Port of Tauranga was renewed.

In 1920 a Royal Commission was set up to investigate the viability of the government purchasing either the entire TTT Co or just the TTT Co tramway and options for building a railway into Taupō. The commission consisted of H.J.H. Blow, chief engineer of the Public Works Department, as chairman; Mr. F.W. Furkert, chief engineer of the TTT Co; Mr. H. Buxton of NZR; and Mr. G.H.M. McClure, Commissioner of Crown Lands for Wellington, with Mr. H.H. Sterling as secretary. In 1921 the commission brought forward a unanimous finding "There is urgent necessity in order to avoid great national waste, for an extension of the Rotorua Government Railway to Waiotapu with as little delay as possible". Despite this finding, no further action was taken by the government. The Rotorua Taupō Railway League, led by Edward Earle Vaile, continued to vigorously campaign for the Rotorua–Taupo railway to be built.

In May 1922 a Royal Commission was set up to investigate the construction and working of a Rotorua–Taupō railway, with five members: H. Buxton, G. T. Murray, L.M. Ellis, J.D. Ritchie and H. Munro. Its terms of reference were to access anticipated traffic and profitability and assess the area's settlement potential and a possible route. A favourable report was returned by the commission; despite this, no further action was taken by the government.

In 1924 a line from Rotorua to Reporoa was authorised by Parliament in the Railways Authorisation Act, 1924 as the Rotorua-Taupō (Line): an extension of the authorised line from Rotorua southward to Reporoa. Length about 28 miles (45 km). However construction was not started as the Government's focus at the time was on completing the construction of the East Coast Main Trunk Line.

Much lobbying continued by Rotorua interests and by the Rotorua Taupō Railway League, which consisted of settlers living between Taupō and Rotorua. By 1928 support for the Rotorua–Taupō line was very strong.

==== Cabinet approval ====
In June 1928 the Coates government cabinet approved the construction of the Rotorua–Taupō railway. The line was to be constructed initially as far as Waiotapu, and then onwards to Taupō via Reporoa. Work began almost immediately with teams of construction workers transferred from the extension of the East Coast Main Trunk from Taneatua to Ōpōtiki, which had been stopped. An ex-railways employee doubted whether the new line would be economic.

In Rotorua, it had been hoped that work on the line would go to Rotorua people, as unemployment was very high in the town. For approximately one year from the date of approval by cabinet, men worked on constructing embankments and cuttings along the proposed route a short distance out of Rotorua between Waipa and Waiotapu.

However, in 1929, as a result of the depression and a downturn in economic activity, the Forbes government cabinet announced that work on the Rotorua–Taupō railway would cease as soon as jobs could be found in other parts of the country for the men working on this scheme. This was a real blow to the supporters of the railway and did not help Rotorua at a time of high unemployment. There was much vocal opposition in Rotorua at the line being stopped and calls for the work to be resumed. The Rotorua Taupō Railway League produced a pamphlet titled "The truth about the Taupō Railway - the story of a great crime" arguing the need for and numerous benefits this line would bring, and the unjust stopping of the project by the government. The work did not resume and the formation and cuttings were abandoned. Some of this work can still be seen between Rotorua and Taupō along State Highway 5, on the western side of the road, a short distance out of Rotorua.

From 1929 onwards there were various calls for the railway between Rotorua and Taupō to be restarted but nothing of any great significance occurred until 1968.

=== Paengaroa-Rotorua-Taupō line ===
In 1968 NZR announced a proposal to construct a new line to Rotorua from Paengaroa on the East Coast Main Trunk, with an extension to the Waipa State Mill. This was a similar route to the one first proposed by the Tauranga East Coast and Hot Lakes District Railway in the 1880s. An extension to Taupō was also seen by NZR "as being very attractive". This proposal followed from the recommendations of a 1963 Commission of Inquiry report to investigate "Improved Access by Land to the Port of Tauranga and Bay of Plenty", which had recommended:

- The construction of a deviation from Waharoa to Apata through the Kaimai Range, and the closure of the Paeroa to Apata section of the East Coast Main Trunk.
- The construction of a Rotorua to Paengaroa deviation to eliminate the Mamaku Bank on the Rotorua Branch.
- An extension of the Rotorua Branch to the Waipa State Mill.

The proposal created much attention both in support and against the idea. NZR wanted a better link into the Rotorua region to tap into and serve the central North Island pine forests with the Port of Tauranga and a line with easier grades than the steep line over the Mamaku ranges.

The route of the proposed new line and in particular, the proposed siting of new marshalling yards at Rotorua was the reason for much of the objections. NZR wanted to extend the existing Rotorua Branch line from the central city station, across Fenton Street to Ngapuna where they proposed having a large marshalling yard, along with a spur line running south to the Waipa State Mill. Many people in Rotorua objected to having a railway crossing Fenton Street and wanted the railway marshalling yards located at Waipa instead of Ngapuna. NZR objected to shifting the marshalling yards to Waipa, as it would significantly increase the cost of the project by around $6m. However an equally great number of people in Rotorua supported the railway proposal and consequently it became a hot political debate. By 1973 NZR started to back down on the proposal and stated that the scheme would only proceed if the people of Rotorua agreed upon where the marshalling yards would be located. The scheme fell through shortly after.

=== 1980 Rotorua-Taupō line ===
In 1980 NZR carried out a number of investigations into possible rail routes to Taupō, one of which was a route between Tarukenga on the Rotorua Branch, via Paradise Valley and the western side of Pukehangi Road through to the Waipa State Mill, and then onwards south to the Fletchers Taupō Mill via the Reporoa dairy factory.

The route proposed was considered an improvement on the original 1920s route and was said to address the contentious issues raised with the earlier route of the proposed Paengaroa-Rotorua line, such as the location of marshalling yards in Rotorua and avoiding having the line running through the urban area in Rotorua city. This new route however was still limited by the steep grades of the existing Rotorua Branch over the Mamaku ranges, to which it would connect to. A northern extension of the proposed new line from Tarukenga onwards around the northern side of Lake Rotorua to Paengaroa on the ECMT was said to address this if included, and would also provide a shorter and more direct link between Taupō and the Port of Tauranga.

In 1989 the central city station and railway yard at Rotorua closed, and along with the last 2 km of the line were lifted and relocated to Koutu.

=== Kakahi-Pukawa line ===
A proposal to construct a railway between Kakahi on the North Island Main Trunk and Pukawa on the shores of Lake Taupō, near Tokaanu, was made by a group of three people - Te Heuheu Tukino, Paramount chief of the Ngati Tuwharetoa iwi (tribe); Lawrence Grace, who was closely related through marriage to the tribe; and Tudor Atkinson, the founder of the TTT Co.

The three set up a company called the Tongariro Timber Company Limited with the intention to construct the railway and to have branch lines heading into the bush at various points along the route to harvest the native timber along the way. The railway was intended to be paid for using some of the large sums of money expected to be earned from the timber to be harvested. It was agreed that the land would remain in Māori ownership and that the Tongariro Timber Company Limited would operate the railway. Once the railway was built the company would carry freight other than timber, such as dressed flax and grain, and passengers at Government rates. The railway would connect with a ferry service on Lake Taupō.

In January 1908 an Order in Council was made allowing the Māori owners to sell land for the construction of the railway. Work began immediately on surveying the proposed railway line. Tudor Atkinson tried locally to raise the necessary capital to build the railway. His efforts proved unsuccessful, and in 1916 he went to London where he formed a separate company to finance the railway. However World War I intervened and the company ended up being dissolved with all money being returned to the prospective shareholders.

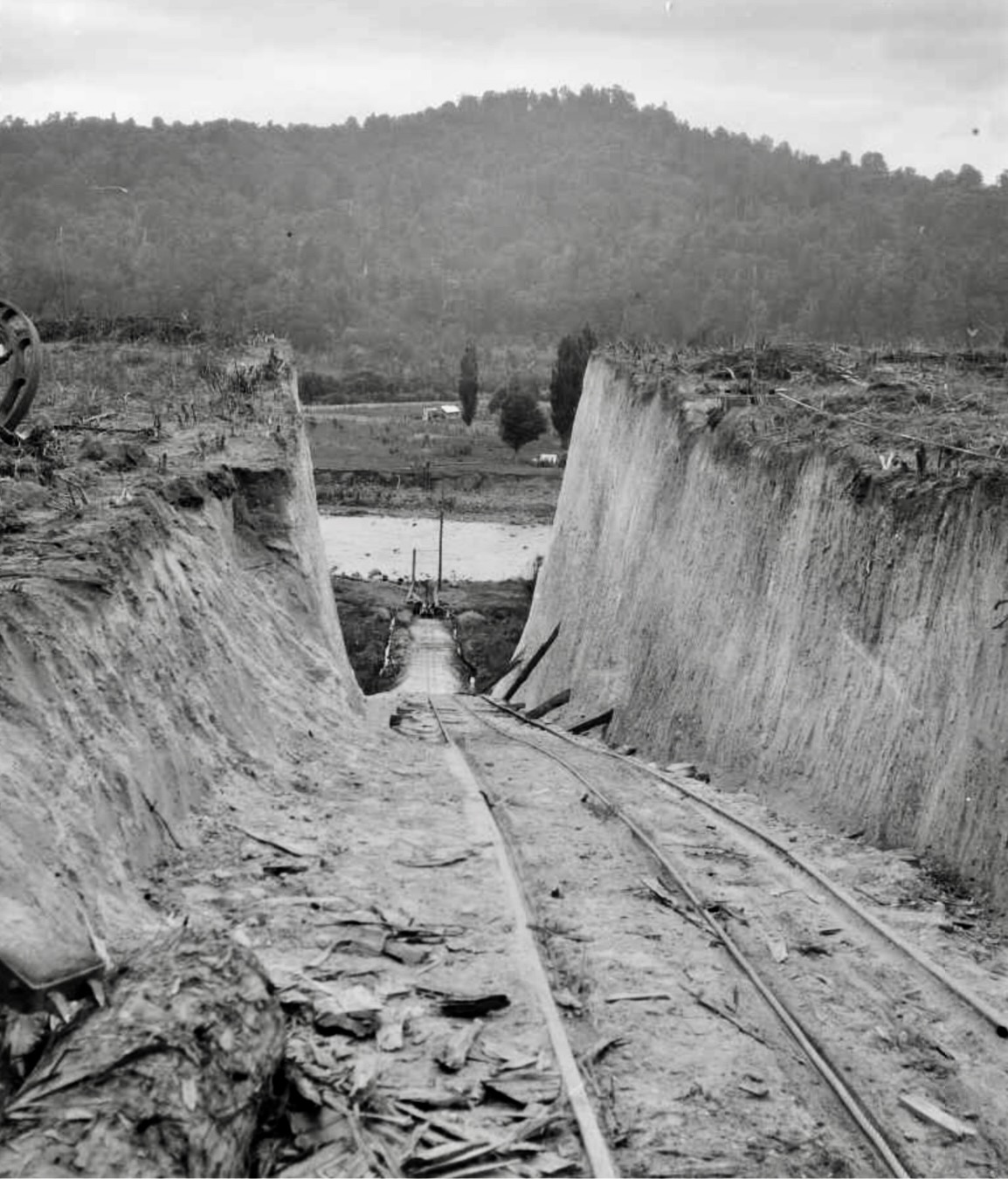
Kakahi cutting and Whakapapa River about 1914. The incline appears to have been rope worked

In 1913 the Egmont Box Company Limited arrived at Kakahi in search of white pine (Kahikatea) for constructing boxes for dairy products. The company found suitable quantities of white pine on land next to which the Tongariro Timber Company held cutting rights to. The company obtained the cutting rights to this land, however it was found that the Egmont Box Company would need to construct a light railway to haul the logs out on. With the Tongariro Timber Company already having plans to build such a railway, it was proposed that the railway be constructed jointly by the two companies.

It was agreed that the Egmont Box Company would construct the railway as far as the land that they were to harvest logs from, and then the Tongariro Timber Company would construct the rest of the line to Pukawa. Work started immediately and soon various cuttings, bridging, and track had been laid. However, with World War I by now claiming many of the necessary fit and able men needed to do the job, work began to slow and it was becoming increasingly difficult to obtain materials, though cuttings and embankments had been built by 1916.

In 1916 progress was further hindered with the New Zealand Government Railways (NZR) changing its mind on how the line was to connect with their line at Kakahi station. This meant that the Egmont Box Company would need to spend a very large amount of money to change the route to that now required to join up with the NZR line at Kakahi. This was money the company did not have and nor did the Tongariro Timber Company. Tudor Atkinson tried very hard to obtain the necessary capital but from this time onwards it was to be the end of the scheme as far as the Tongariro Timber Company and Egmont Box Company were concerned.

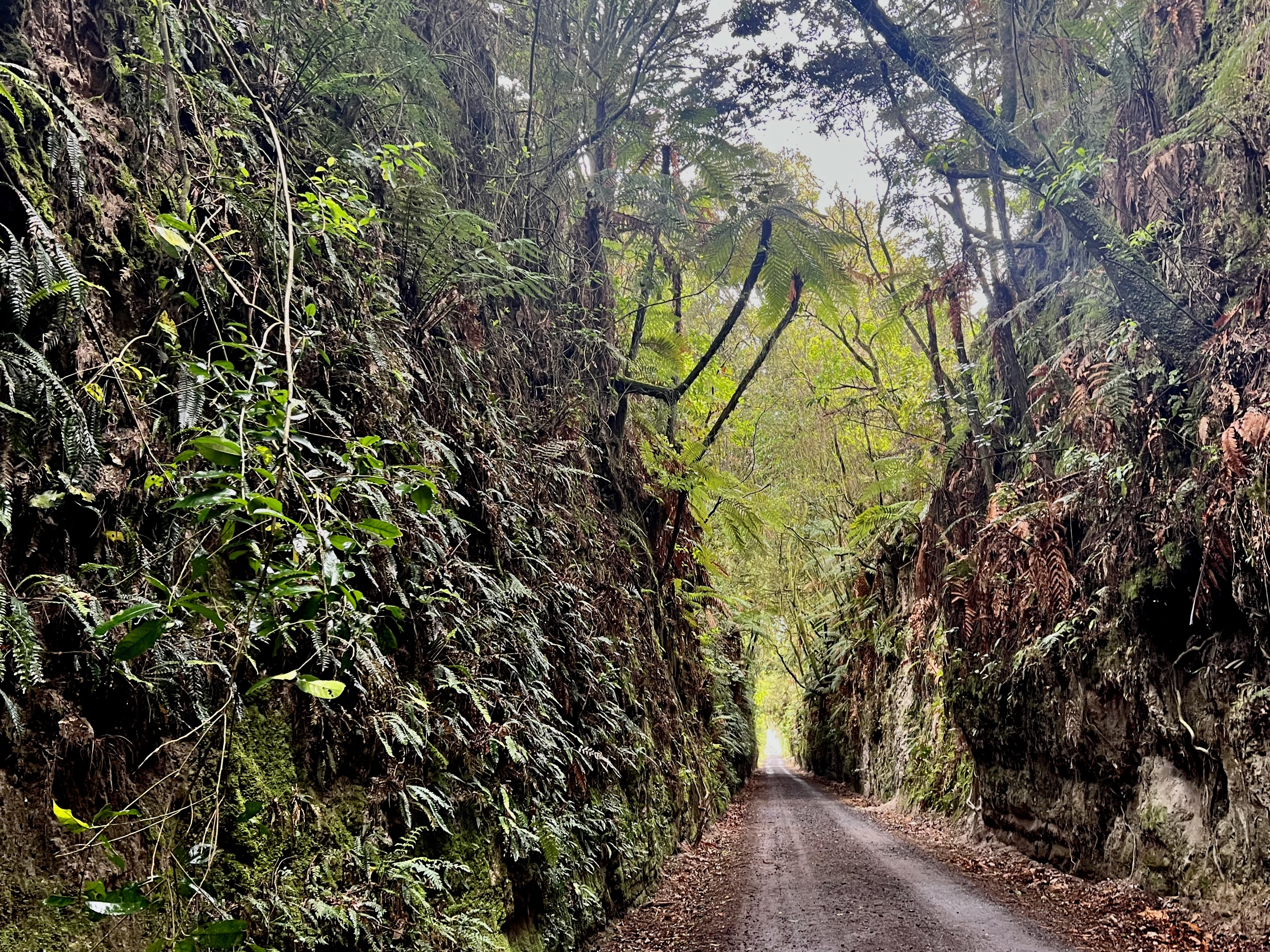
The railway cutting east of Kakahi is now Te Rena Road and best known for its glowworms

Other parties tried to carry out and construct the railway, but all failed to do so with either not being able to obtain the necessary capital or the economic viability of the scheme prevented them making any progress. One group in the 1920s however did raise the necessary capital and gained the support from the Māori landowners but not the Government. Consequently, this lack of support from the Government was why their scheme did not eventuate. A 1921 Order in Council said the line was to be completed within 7 years, money was raised in 1922 and there was a report of a £500,000 contract for Cammell Laird to build it in 1924, but which was then said to be only at the negotiating stage. In 1927 there was a complaint that construction hadn't started. An attempt was made to form another company in 1928.

The forest between Kakahi and Lake Taupō remained standing until after World War II when it was felled. By then the railway proposal had given way to road transport. Today all that can be seen of this scheme is the rail formation and large cutting built from Kakahi to the Whakapapa River (better known for its glowworms) and a concrete pier on the river bed. A 1923 map shows the line extending to a bridge over the Whanganui River at Whangapeki. In 1927 the suggestion to link the line to Taupō via Tokaanu was briefly revived.

=== Murupara Branch line ===
Since 1980 there have been proposals to extend the Murupara Branch line to Taupō. The principal reason for extending this line has been to tap into the plantation pine forests in the central North Island and in particular those in the Taupō region.

==== 1980 proposal ====
In 1980 a report was produced by NZR on possible rail routes to Taupō, which included two possible routes from the railhead at Murupara. The principal route of the line was to be constructed from the railhead at Murupara by way of two possible routes to address the steep climb up onto the Kaingaroa plains, where it would cross towards the State Highway 5 Napier-Taupō Road, then sweep around the southern flank of Mt Tauhara in an arc like shape and then head north towards the Taupō industrial area before sweeping around in another arc in the Broadlands Road area and terminating at the Fletchers Taupō Mill on Centennial Drive.

The report also suggested possible extensions could be made from this proposed route to Napier, Waiouru and National Park.

The route to Napier would run from Te Awa (near High Level Road) through to Waikoau (north of Napier) on the Palmerston North-Gisborne line.

The routes to Waiouru and National Park would run from Waimihia on the State Highway 5 Napier-Taupō Road, south through to Rangipo, with the route to Waiouru following a similar route south to the State Highway 1 Desert Road, and the route to National Park running east from Rangipo following a similar route to State Highway 47 and 46 along the northern boarder of the Tongaririo National Park to join the NIMT just south of National Park station.

==== 1983 proposal ====
In 1983 a study by town and country planners of the Ministry of Works found that if a railway were to be constructed into the Taupō region, it would be very beneficial in transporting logs and sawn timber out of the region to the Pulp and Paper Mill at Kawerau and for export through the Port of Tauranga. It was also found that such a line would break even with revenue made from it covering the costs of constructing it.

The line was to be constructed from the present railhead at Murupara, across the Kaingaroa plains where it would sweep around the southern flank of Mt Tauhara in an arc like shape and then head north towards the Taupō industrial area before sweeping around in another arc in the Broadlands Road area and terminating at the Taupō Mill on Centennial Drive. It was also suggested that there be a second stage to construct a line from the first stage line, near the State Highway 5 Napier-Taupō Road through to Rangipo, so as to tap into forests in the Turangi area.

==== 1985 proposal ====
In 1985 Deputy General Manager of the New Zealand Railways Corporation, Bob Henare, stated that a proposed extension of the Murupara Branch line to Taupō would be a "no frills" style of railway with sharper curves and steeper grades so as to keep costs down. The line was to be a forestry style railway similar to the Murupara Branch, with its key role being to transport timber. Predicted increases in the number of logging trucks on public roads would also become a major problem when logging commenced in the region. He also said that the line would need to be constructed quickly as the rapidly maturing forests would not wait while people argued over whether or not to build the line. It was also intended for the line to be electrified from Taupō through to Mt Maunganui, once men who were at the time working on the electrification of the North Island Main Trunk, could be transferred on completion of the project.

The 1985 proposal did not eventuate following the large scale restructuring and downsizing of NZR in the mid 1980s, as part of the large scale economic reforms being undertaken the Fourth Labour Government at this time. Proposals to have the line extended to Taupō have been raised since that time, the last being in 1998.

==== 1998 proposal ====
In 1998 the findings of a study by consultants Woodward-Clyde for Environment Bay of Plenty, Environment Waikato, the Taupō District Council and Tranz Rail Limited were published to evaluate the various proposals to deal with transporting forestry products out of the Taupō region. The report stated that railheads could be accessed at Waiouru, National Park, Kinleith, and Murupara. The report said that it would be unlikely that rail connections would be made at National Park or Waiouru as the distance to forestry ports and processing plants would increase. A connection from Kinleith was a possibility but it would need to traverse difficult terrain and two crossings of the Waikato River may be needed. The report recommended an extension of the Murupara Branch line as being the best rail option.

The route recommended was similar to the 1985 proposal. The line would have travelled across the Kaingaroa Plains and followed the route more or less presently taken by the private forestry road, High Level Road. Stage one of the proposal would terminate at the junction between the two private forestry roads, High Level Road and the Off-Highway road leading from the Taupō Mill, near the State Highway 5 Napier-Taupō road. A recommendation was made that a log-processing yard be built at the junction of these two roads in conjunction with the rail line extension from Murupara.

The second stage of the proposal was to extend the line into the Taupō industrial area. The line would extend from the proposed log-processing yard around the southern flank of Mount Tauhara and head north towards Broadlands Road before completing a horseshoe like curve south into the Taupō Mill on Centennial Drive. The report said the line would be used for transporting sawn timber from the processing yard to the mill on Centennial Drive. Forest industry people did not express an interest in this option, as they did not believe it would bring any new opportunities to them.

The report concluded in respect to the rail options that Tranz Rail (now KiwiRail) and Fletcher Forests (now Tenon) would need to check the opportunities in extending a line south from the Murupara railhead.

A roading option was consequently chosen and the rail proposal did not eventuate. The roading option involved a network of private forestry roads and did not use the proposed rail route.

=== Kinleith-Rotorua-Taupō line ===
In 2014 the New Zealand First political party included a proposal to investigate a Kinleith-Rotorua-Taupō line as part of its transport policy. The proposal consists of an extension of the Kinleith Branch line east across to Waipa mill at Rotorua, before heading south to Taupō via Reporoa and Broadlands, terminating at the Taupō mill.

== See also ==
- Edward Earle Vaile
