= Vaile =

Vaile is a surname. Notable people with the surname include:

- Bobbie Vaile (1959–1996), Australian astronomer
- Bryn Vaile, British yacht racer
- Edward Earle Vaile (1869–1956), New Zealand farmer and philanthropist
- Gertrude Vaile (1878-1954), American social worker
- Mark Vaile (born 1956), Australian politician
- William N. Vaile (1876–1927), American politician
