= Kakahi =

Kakahi may refer to:

- Kākahi, the New Zealand freshwater mussel, Echyridella menziesii
- Kakahi, New Zealand, a settlement in the King Country
- Tohu Kākahi (1828–1907), Māori leader
