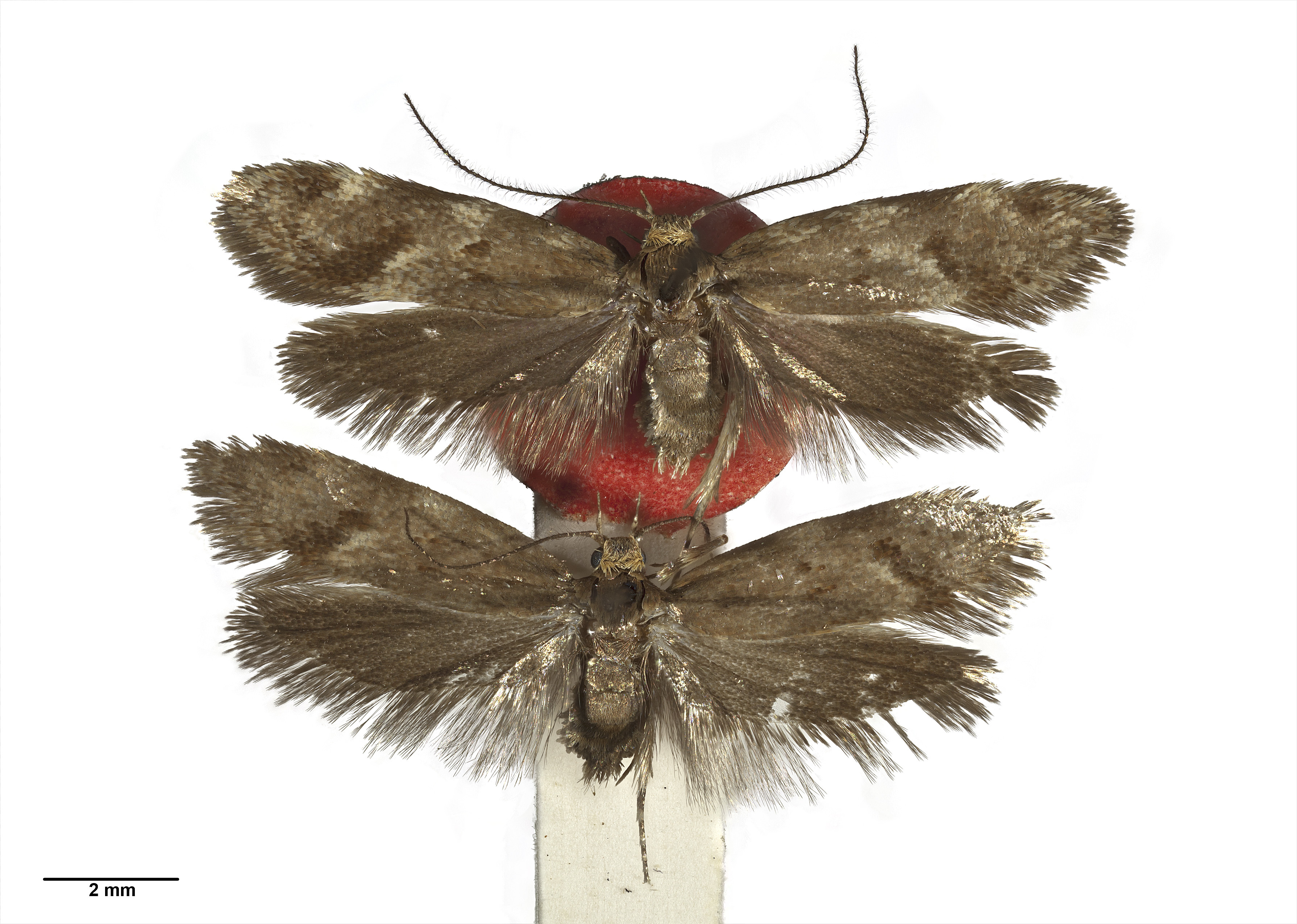
- Holotype and allotype Locheutis fusca specimens held at Auckland Museum

Scientific classification
- Kingdom: Animalia
- Phylum: Arthropoda
- Class: Insecta
- Order: Lepidoptera
- Family: Oecophoridae
- Genus: Locheutis
- Species: L. fusca

Binomial name
- Locheutis fusca Philpott, 1930

= Locheutis fusca =

Species of moth

Locheutis fusca is a moth of the family Oecophoridae. This species was discovered on 16 January 1930 by Alfred Philpott in the Tongariro National Park. L. fusca was described by him later in that same year. It is endemic to New Zealand.

== Description ==
This moth is 13 - 14mm in size. L. fusca can be distinguished from the similar looking species Locheutis pulla as L. fusca has much longer hairs on its antenna. It is also has a much less coppery sheen to its wings than Locheutis vagata.

== Habitat ==
Philpott recorded it as being common amongst Beech forest on the banks of the Whakapapa River.
