= Stillwater, West Coast =

Stillwater
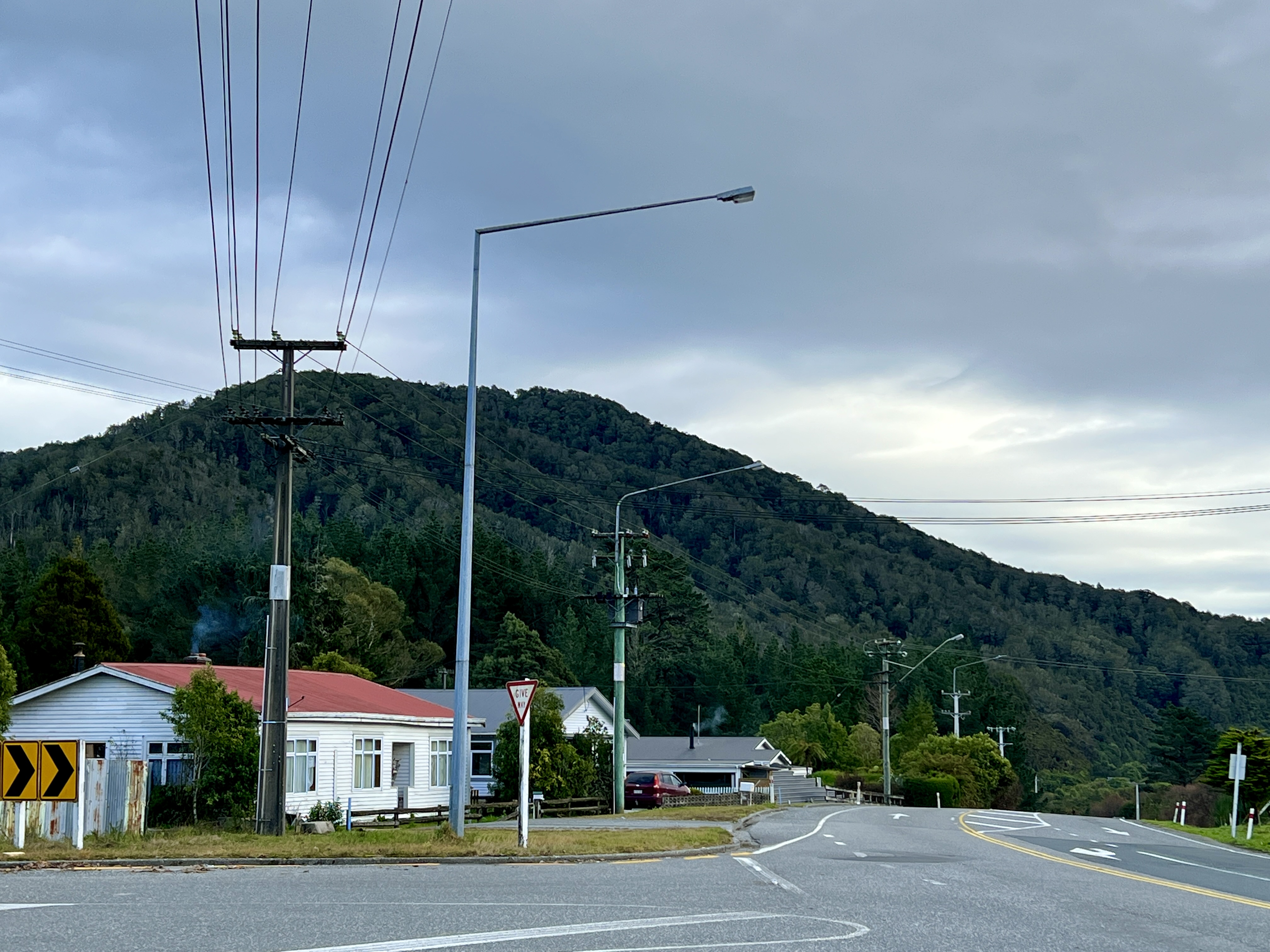
- Stillwater and Mount Buckley

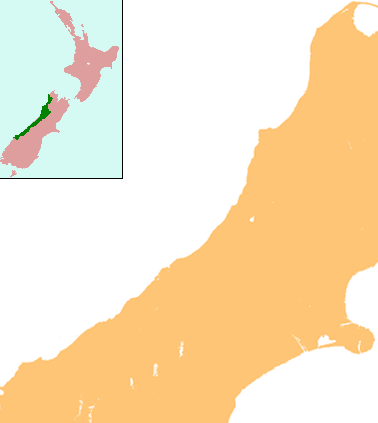
- Location within West Coast
- Coordinates: 42°26′24″S 171°21′11″E
- Country: New Zealand
- Region: West Coast
- District: Grey District

Stillwater is a town in the South Island of New Zealand east of Greymouth on the banks of the Grey River, at the confluence with the Arnold River, in the Grey District of the West Coast, next to Brunner.

== History ==
The junction of the Arnold and Grey rivers, known as Kotukuwhakaoho, was an important site of battles for Ngāi Tahu, as it was the location where Ngāti Wairangi was defeated in the late 18th century, and later Ngāti Tūmatakōkiri in the 1810s.

The miners who died in the Brunner Mine Disaster on 26 March 1896 were buried in the cemetery at Stillwater. Thirty three men were buried in a mass grave. Hundreds of people came by train from towns on the West Coast to attend the funerals.

In 1906 the town's industry was centred on saw milling. It had a hotel, store, post and telegraph office and a school which opened in 1888.

In 2015 the hotel was still in operation but has since closed.

== Sawmilling ==
In November 2009 the saw mill at Stillwater was completely destroyed in a fire. The 2009 West Coast Industry Review by Crown Forestry recommended reducing 'off-Coast' log sales and local processing of the West Coast's wood harvest; it identified Stillwater as the best location for a saw mill because of the ease and cost of cartage. The mill's owners Southern Pine Products rebuilt the mill and took the opportunity to upgrade the plant with the latest technology. Production from the mill recommenced in late 2009.

The mill installed New Zealand's first continuous wood drying kiln in 2010 in addition to its existing batch kiln. It was built by the New Zealand company Windsor Engineering. The continuous drying kiln takes the timber into the kiln on an automated track where it is dried to the right moisture content using heating and heat recovery and forced cooling and conditioning phases.

In 2015 the mill employed 42 full-time staff.

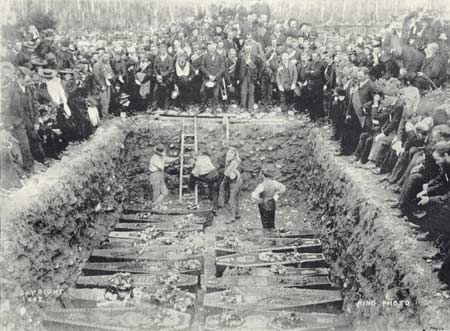
The mass burial of Brunner Mine disaster victims at the Stillwater cemetery.

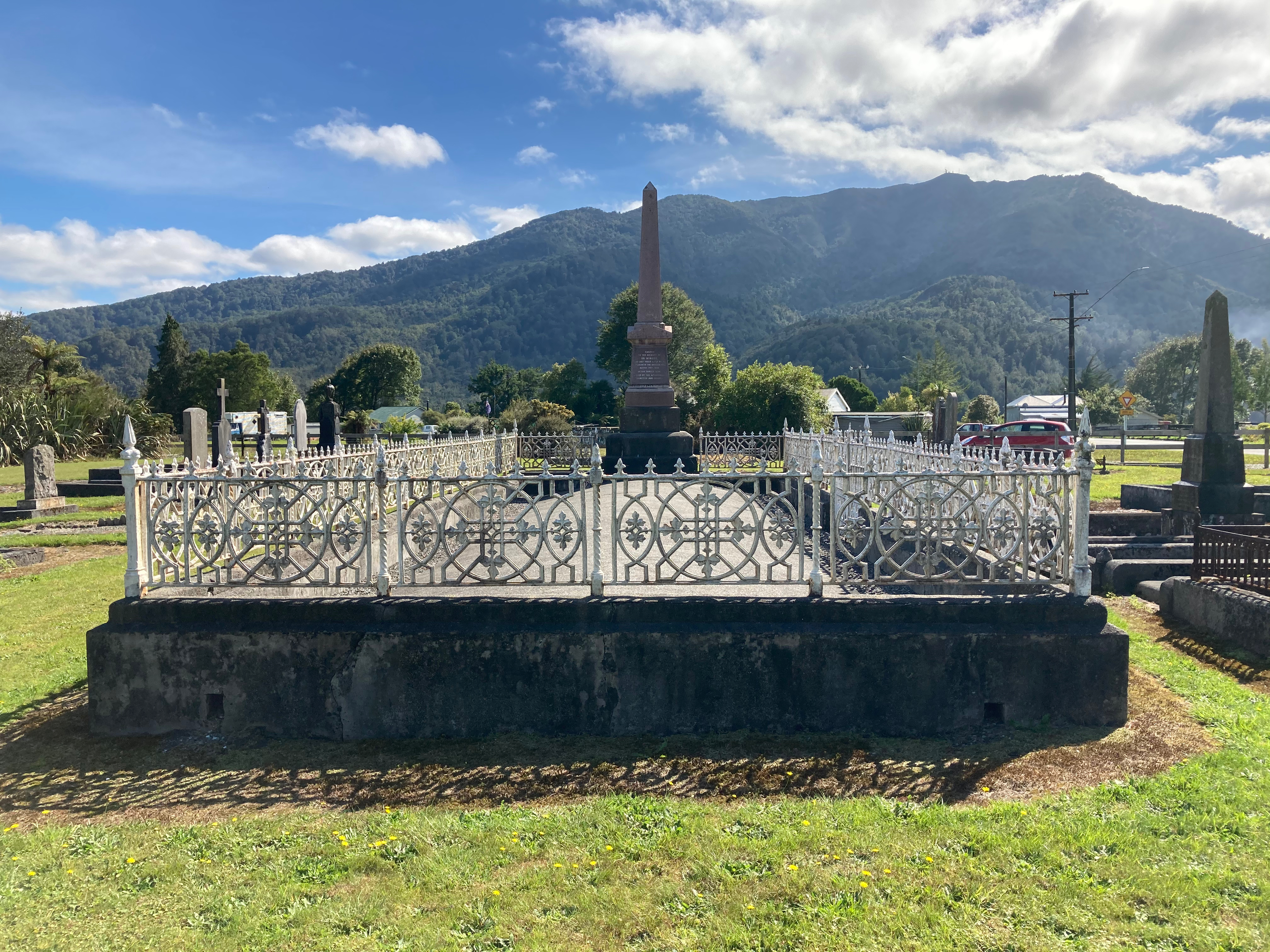
The mass grave site in March 2021.

== Transport ==
State Highway 7 passes through Stillwater, and it is a railway junction where the Stillwater - Westport Line meets the Midland Line. The Stillwater Junction Railway Station opened on 14 November 1887. The railway bridge (Bridge 103) was designed by Charles Napier Bell, one of New Zealand's notable colonial civil engineers, and built by the New Zealand Midland Railway Company. It spans Stillwater Creek, west of the station. In 2008–2009 the bridge was rebuilt retaining its original design and heritage features.

The TranzAlpine passenger express train which runs the length of the Midland Line from Christchurch to Greymouth passes through Stillwater, but does not stop. Previous passenger services did stop, e.g. a service to Westport run by RM class Vulcan railcars up to 1967. The station refreshment room closed at the same time.

== Notable people ==
- Ruth Croft, ultrarunner, grew up in Stillwater.

== See also ==
Timeline of Māori battles
