= Ōwhango =

Settlement in Manawatū-Whanganui Region, New Zealand

- Town
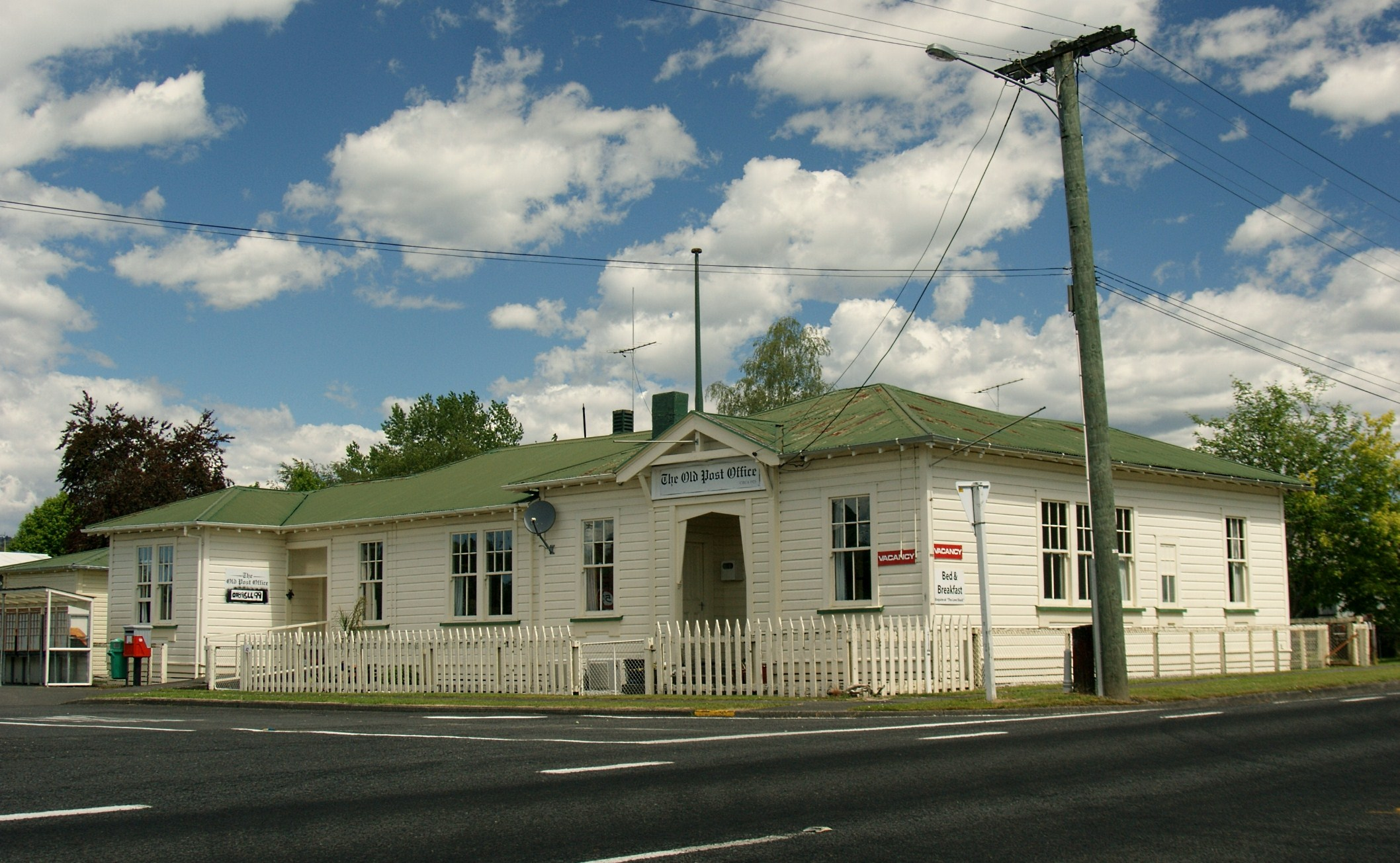
- The old Owhango Post Office c. 1919
- Interactive map of Ōwhango
- Coordinates: 39°00.0′S 175°22.6′E
- Country: New Zealand
- Region: Manawatū-Whanganui
- District: Ruapehu District
- Ward: Ruapehu General Ward; Ruapehu Māori Ward
- Community: Ōwhango-National Park Community
- Electorates: Whanganui; Te Tai Hauāuru (Māori)

Government
  - Territorial Authority: Ruapehu District Council
  - Regional council: Horizons Regional Council
  - Mayor of Ruapehu: Weston Kirton
  - Whanganui MP: Carl Bates
  - Te Tai Hauāuru MP: Debbie Ngarewa-Packer

Area
  - Total: 0.61 km^{2} (0.24 sq mi)

Population (June 2025)
  - Total: 200
  - Density: 330/km^{2} (850/sq mi)

Ōwhango is a small town in New Zealand situated about 20 kilometres (12 mi) south of Taumarunui on State Highway 4 (SH4), and about 2 kilometres (1.2 mi) west of the Whakapapa River, a tributary of the nascent Whanganui River.

Ōwhango has been the official name since 16 July 2020. It is a Māori name that translates as "the place of wheezy noises".

The village features a backdrop of native forest and Mount Ruapehu, with native birds like tūī and kererū. The domain, set amongst native forest, includes large open playing fields, children's play area and two tennis courts.

The Main Trunk Line passes through Ōwhango on the western side of State Highway 4, with two crossing points for vehicles, one controlled (Owhango Road, centrally located) and the other uncontrolled (Onematua Road, on the northern boundary). From 1905 to 1985 Ōwhango had a railway station.

== Geography ==
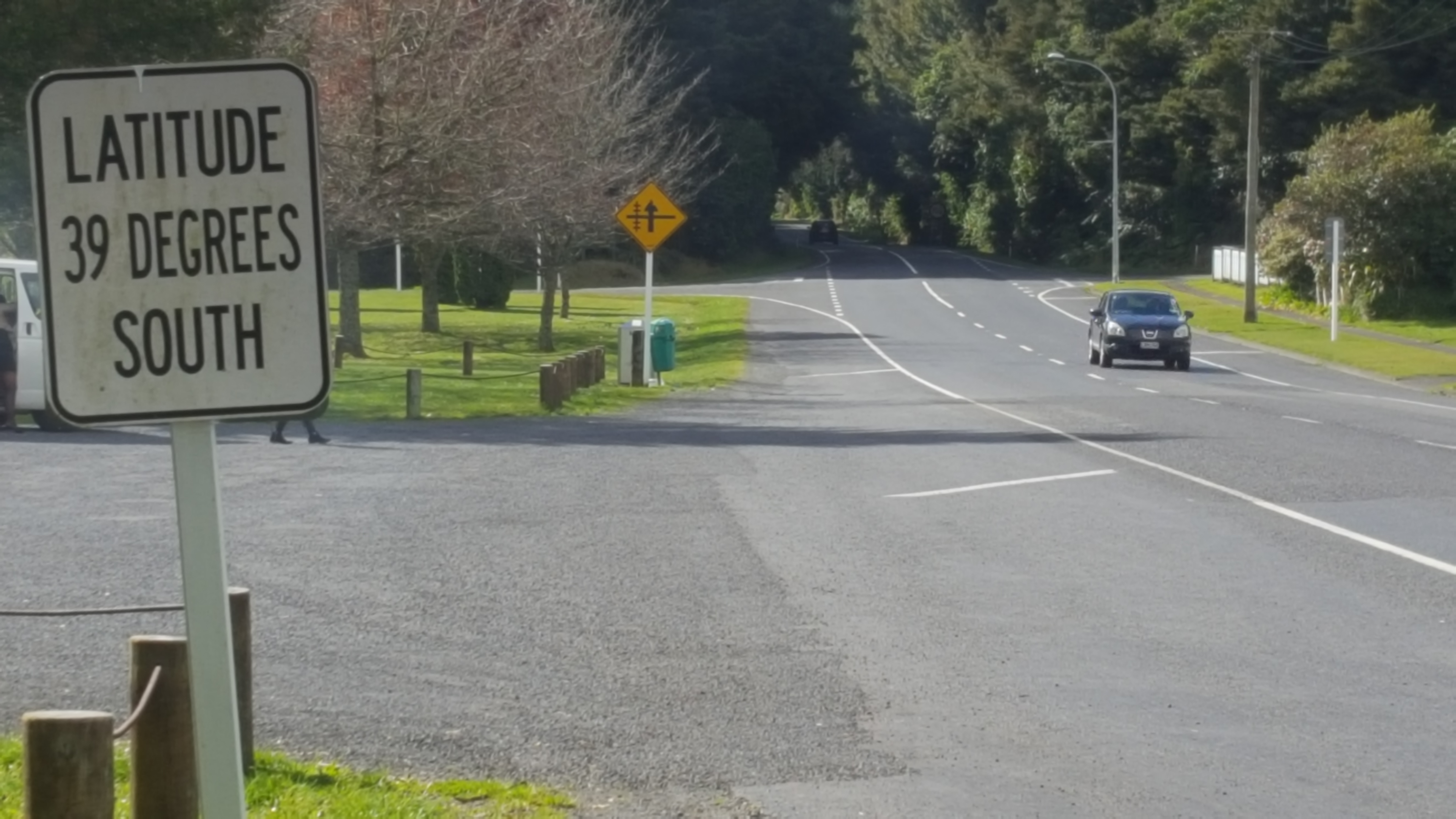
Latitude 39 degrees south sign in Ōwhango, looking north, September 2019

Ōwhango is located on the 39° latitude line, placing it on the boundary of the old Auckland Province and Wellington Province.

Halfway through Ōwhango is a sign marking "39° South". This sign is accurate (to within a few metres) when using NZ Geodetic Datum 1949. The position of 39° South when using WGS84 (or NZ Geodetic Datum 2000) is about 196 metres further south, but this is not marked.

The native forest is part of the Ohinetonga Scenic Reserve which contains unlogged old growth native forest containing some forest giants and a lagoon accessible from a looped walking track. A road through the reserve, signposted from the State Highway, leads down to the view from the old logging bridge over the Whakapapa River. Along the river are picnic spots with swimming pools containing rainbow and brown trout. It is also a launch point for kayakers heading for Kakahi, or even further down the Whanganui River.

Beyond the bridge is the vast expanse of Tongariro Forest Conservation Area, once the source of timber for local mills, but now protected as conservation land thanks to a successful campaign in the 1980s led by local people to save the forest from clearance. Bisecting the forest is one of New Zealand's best mountain bike rides, the 42 Traverse. The forest also has excellent tramping, camping and deer hunting opportunities. In the heart of the regenerating forest is one of only a handful of national kiwi sanctuaries where the Department of Conservation controls alien predators to protect a population of the North Island Brown Kiwi.

== History ==
Ōwhango began as a mill town, milling native timbers from around the local area. The last operational mill burned to the ground in the 1970s. Many of the mill houses are now holiday homes owned by city dwellers keen on the skiing, fishing, hunting, canoeing and tramping opportunities that abound in the surrounding area. The village had a permanent population of 177 (2013 census data) and has a primary school, garage (no fuel sold there, however), hotel, accommodation lodges, cottages for hire and bed and breakfast/homestay places and a café and public hall where the monthly market is held.

There is a historical swimming pool actually constructed into the bed of the Kakahi Stream, located about 500 metres (1,600 ft) west down Onematua Road from State Highway 4 at the northern boundary of Ōwhango. The pool was created by locals in the hope of preparing one of the local athletes for the British Empire and Commonwealth Games. Beside the pool is a monument marking the centenary of the Treaty of Waitangi. Local records indicate the pool was first ready for use over the 1939/1940 summer. In 1961 a conventional swimming pool in the grounds of the local school was opened.

The Ōwhango Hall was originally used as a silent movies cinema seating 250. In more recent times it has mainly been used for community meetings and events, indoors bowls, and market days.

The Ōwhango Volunteer Fire Brigade has been operating since 1965.

== Demographics ==
Ōwhango is described by Stats NZ as a rural settlement. It covers 0.61 km^{2} (0.24 sq mi) and had an estimated population of 200 as of June 2025, with a population density of 328 people per km^{2}. It is part of the larger National Park statistical area.

Historical population
Year	Pop.	±% p.a.
2006	189	—
2013	177	−0.93%
2018	174	−0.34%
2023	195	+2.31%

Ōwhango had a population of 195 in the 2023 New Zealand census, an increase of 21 people (12.1%) since the 2018 census, and an increase of 18 people (10.2%) since the 2013 census. There were 87 males, 105 females, and 3 people of other genders in 84 dwellings. 3.1% of people identified as LGBTIQ+. The median age was 44.3 years (compared with 38.1 years nationally). There were 45 people (23.1%) aged under 15 years, 24 (12.3%) aged 15 to 29, 84 (43.1%) aged 30 to 64, and 42 (21.5%) aged 65 or older.

People could identify as more than one ethnicity. The results were 83.1% European (Pākehā), 27.7% Māori, 1.5% Asian, and 3.1% other, which includes people giving their ethnicity as "New Zealander". English was spoken by 95.4%, Māori by 7.7%, and other languages by 6.2%. No language could be spoken by 3.1% (e.g. too young to talk). New Zealand Sign Language was known by 1.5%. The percentage of people born overseas was 12.3, compared with 28.8% nationally.

Religious affiliations were 21.5% Christian, 1.5% Hindu, 4.6% Māori religious beliefs, and 1.5% other religions. People who answered that they had no religion were 58.5%, and 12.3% of people did not answer the census question.

Of those at least 15 years old, 27 (18.0%) people had a bachelor's or higher degree, 90 (60.0%) had a post-high school certificate or diploma, and 33 (22.0%) people exclusively held high school qualifications. The median income was $33,400, compared with $41,500 nationally. 6 people (4.0%) earned over $100,000 compared to 12.1% nationally. The employment status of those at least 15 was 60 (40.0%) full-time, 27 (18.0%) part-time, and 3 (2.0%) unemployed.

Farming and tourism are the largest employers.

== Sports and events ==
School & Sports Colours
LightGreen	White
Shorts/Skirt

The local sports teams generally dress in green and white. Historically, especially in the 1950s, the Ōwhango Domain played host to a sub-regional annual sports day. It is still used for occasional sports and school events.

The Ōwhango Hall is sometimes used for indoor bowls, and is also just big enough for one badminton court.

Regular events at the domain and hall include the annual Ōwhango Pumpkin Growing Competition, monthly community markets, and an annual T42 mountain biking, running and walking event.

== Education ==
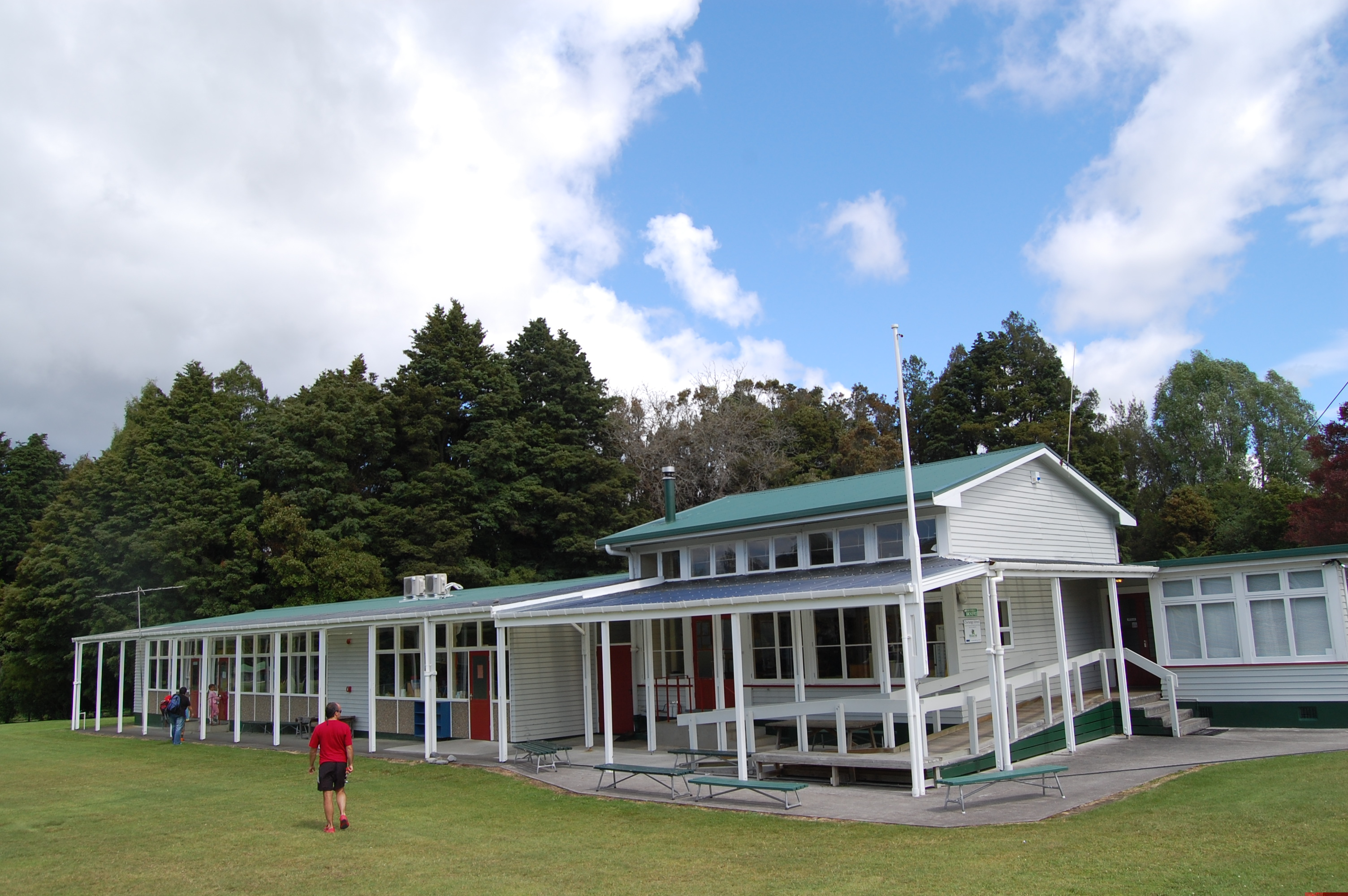
Ōwhango school, with a roll of 69 as at July 2026.

Ōwhango School is a co-educational state primary school for Year 1 to 8 students, with a roll of 69 as of July 2026.

The earliest schooling in Ōwhango was in canvas tents, starting from about 1904 and coinciding with the construction of the railway line through the area. The first permanent school opened in 1910. The current school buildings date from about 1970, with the previous building later relocated to a nearby section.

The Taumaranui Mobile Library visits the school regularly, to provide access to children living remotely.

== Notable people ==
- Don Rowlands, rower
