= Ngāti Hotu =

Māori iwi (tribe) in Aotearoa (New Zealand)

- Iwi (tribe) in Māoridom

Ngāti Hotu was a Māori tribe that, according to tradition, lived in the central North Island of New Zealand in the area surrounding southern Lake Taupō, where the Ngāti Tūwharetoa tribe now resides.

Ngāti Hotu were believed to have been part of the Tini o Toi Tribes of the Bay of Plenty and tradition describes Ngāti Hotu as 'a very fierce and warlike people' whom it took many generations of warfare to destroy, beginning from around the year 1450. Other traditions describe them as spirit people, which as is typical in Māori tradition, had reddish hair and pale white skin, symbolising their tapu nature.

Some members of Ngāti Hotu assert that their ancestors arrived in Aotearoa from the region now known as Iran. They believe as aboriginal people, they are considered a parent tribe predating the arrival of Toi aboard Te Paepae-ki-Rarotonga, with lineage tracing back to Ruatipua and Mouruuru.

== History ==
=== The battle of the five forts ===
Ngāti Hotu were found living around the shores of lakes Taupō and Rotoaira by the Ngāti Tūwharetoa iwi (tribe) in perhaps the 15th century. Ngāti Tūwharetoa were then resident at Kawerau and associated with Te Arawa iwi which today occupies the area from the Bay of Plenty coastline to the Lake Taupō district. Ngāti Hotu suffered a major defeat at the battle of Pukekaikiore ('hill of the meal of rats') to the southwest of Lake Taupō where Ngāti Tūwharetoa devastated them, causing the few survivors to flee.

Some of the survivors are believed to have settled around the village of Kakahi ('freshwater mussels') which lies 30 kilometres west of Lake Taupō. They were discovered there by a party of Whanganui Māori journeying up the river of the same name, who soon called up reinforcements to attack the settlement. The Ngāti Hotu set up a ring of five forts around Kakahi which the Whanganui Māori attacked and took one by one until finally the last two, Otutaarua and Arikipakewa, fell. The final, brutal episode of the battle was played out on the flats between Kakahi and the Whanganui river when the now, effectively victorious Whanganui Māori hung the legs of fallen Ngāti Hotu warriors from poles mounted in the forks of trees - a gesture at which their remaining enemies broke and fled off into the depths of the King Country and were thought to have vanished from history, until a Ngati Hotu Matriarch, Monica Matamua, travelled to object to this at the Waitangi Tribunal in the 1990s. Today the Tribe consists of around 2000 registered members, most based in the central North Island near Taumaranui.

The battle is estimated to have occurred circa 1450 and its story has since been handed down through 15 generations to the Whanganui kaumatua Takiwa Tauarua, who related it to prominent New Zealand artist Peter McIntyre in the 1960s.
