= Whakapapa River =

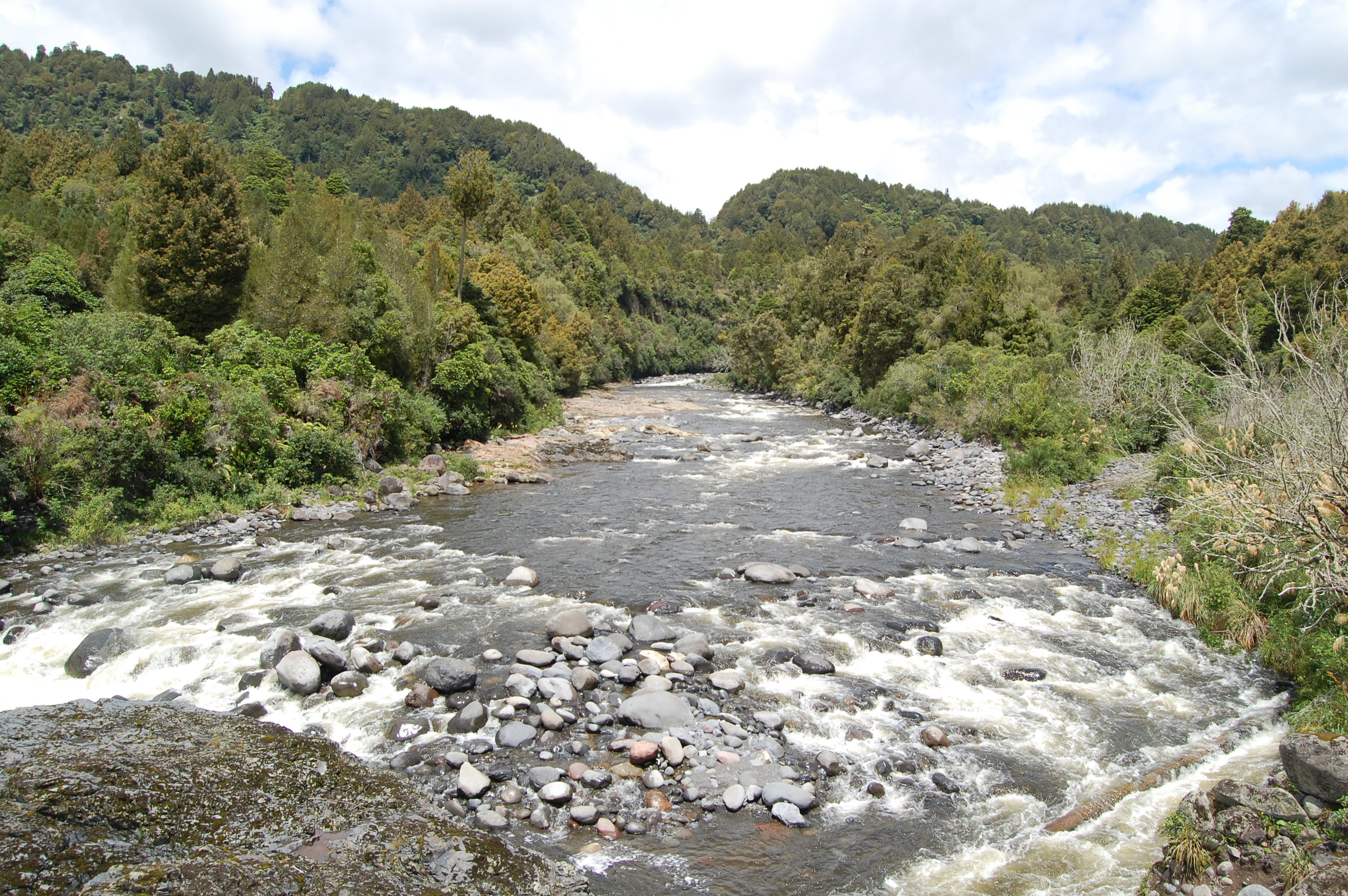
- Whakapapa River near Ōwhango

- Location within New Zealand
- Native name: Whakapapa (Māori)

Location
- Country: New Zealand
- Region: Manawatū-Whanganui
- District: Ruapehu

Physical characteristics
- Source: Mount Ruapehu
  - location: Whakapapa skifield (Whakapapaiti Stream)
  - coordinates: 39°15′40″S 175°33′50″E
  - elevation: 1,930 m (6,330 ft)
- 2nd source: Confluence of Whakapapaiti & Whakapapanui Streams
  - elevation: 740 m (2,430 ft)
- Mouth: Whanganui River
  - coordinates: 38°55′48″S 175°24′28″E
  - elevation: 255 m (837 ft)
- Length: 40 km (25 mi)

Basin features
- Progression: Whakapapanui Stream → Whakapapa River → Whanganui River
- River system: Whanganui River
- Waterfalls: Tawhai Falls

The Whakapapa River in New Zealand forms from streams which trickle off the Whakapapa skifield of Mount Ruapehu and down the western slopes of the mountain. The river passes near Ōwhango, before finally merging with the Whanganui River just east of Kakahi, about 40 km (25 mi) from where it starts, which is in a 100 m (330 ft) deep gorge, at the confluence of the Whakapapaiti and Whakapapanui Streams.

Before construction of the North Island Main Trunk Railway began in about 1904, most of the valley was a dense podocarp forest. In 1914 logging of the last sizeable west bank section of that bush began, near Oio.

Peter McIntyre had a home near Kakahi overlooking the confluence of the Whanganui and Whakapapa rivers, and painted several oil landscapes of the Whakapapa River. After his death, the Whakapapa River undermined the white pumice cliffs where his house was built and claimed the house as its own.

Occasionally people kayak a 7.5-kilometre (4.7 mi) stretch of the river from near Ōwhango (38°59.80′S 175°23.92′E) to near Kakahi (38°56.41′S 175°24.50′E). When the river was high enough, kayaks went 23 km (14 mi) from the Whakapapa Intake to Ōwhango bridge. However, Intake Road was closed when a Landcorp farm passed to Te Kotahitanga a Ngāti Tūwharetoa on 1 July 2019. Herenga ā Nuku and Fish and Game have since been negotiating for public access.

Eels and Crans bullies live in the river. Trout were put in the river around 1911 and Fish & Game now describe it as very clear and having one of the finest trout fisheries, with rainbow and brown trout.

However, the upper reaches were diverted from the Whakapapa Intake, via tunnels (about 11 km (6.8 mi) and 5.5 km (3.4 mi) long and over 3 m (9.8 ft) in diameter), Te Whaiau Stream and Lake Otamangakau reservoir to Lake Rotoaira, as part of the Tongariro Power Scheme, built between 1964 and 1971. Since then the water has been warmer, as about 80% of the river's headwaters now flow into the Waikato catchment. It has also increased the proportion of water coming from developed land. The river is among the worst 25% of rivers for dissolved reactive phosphorus pollution. The Intake was also repaired in 2009.

== Tributaries ==
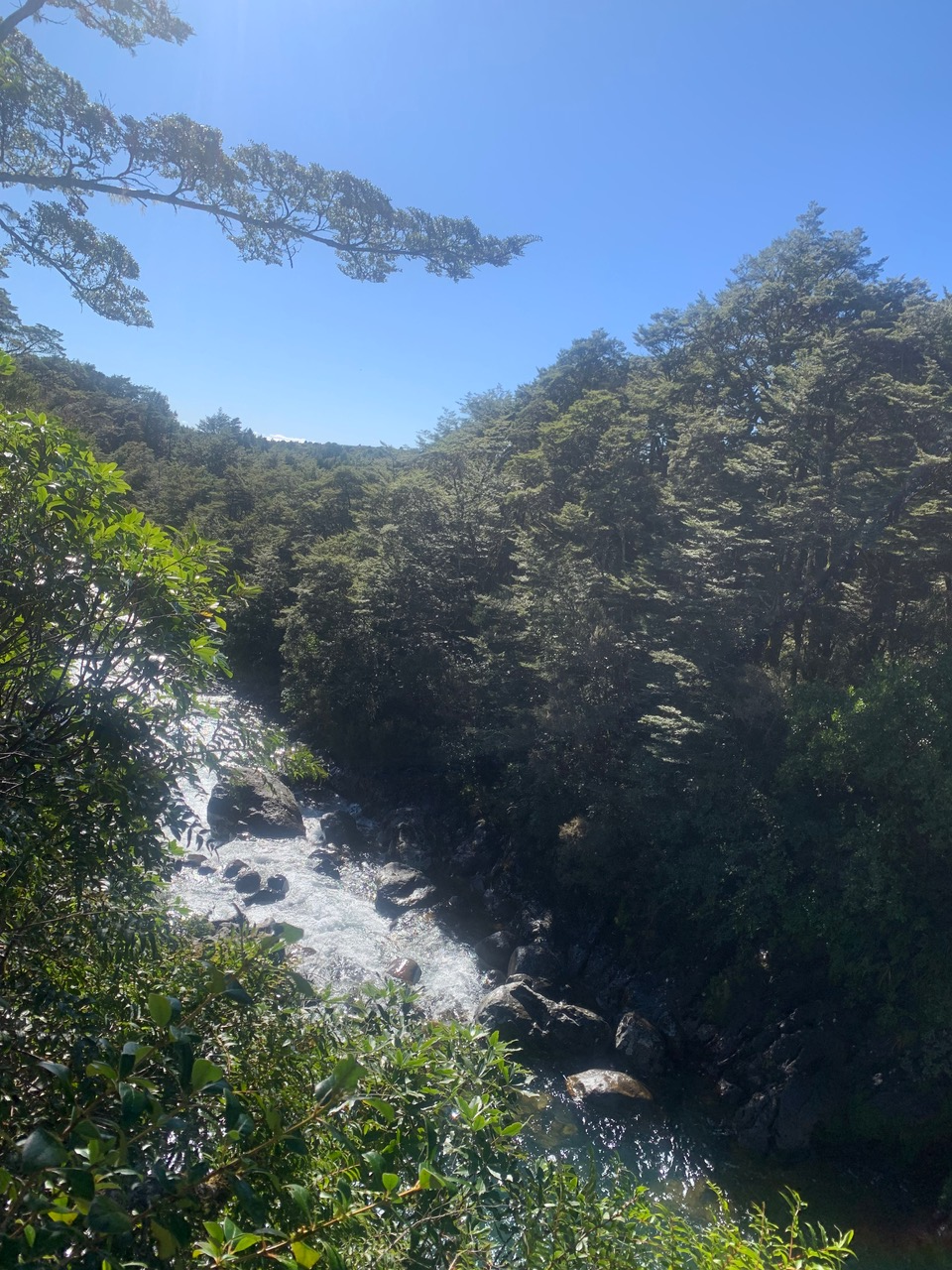
Whakapapanui stream near Tawhai Falls that flows into Whakapapa River

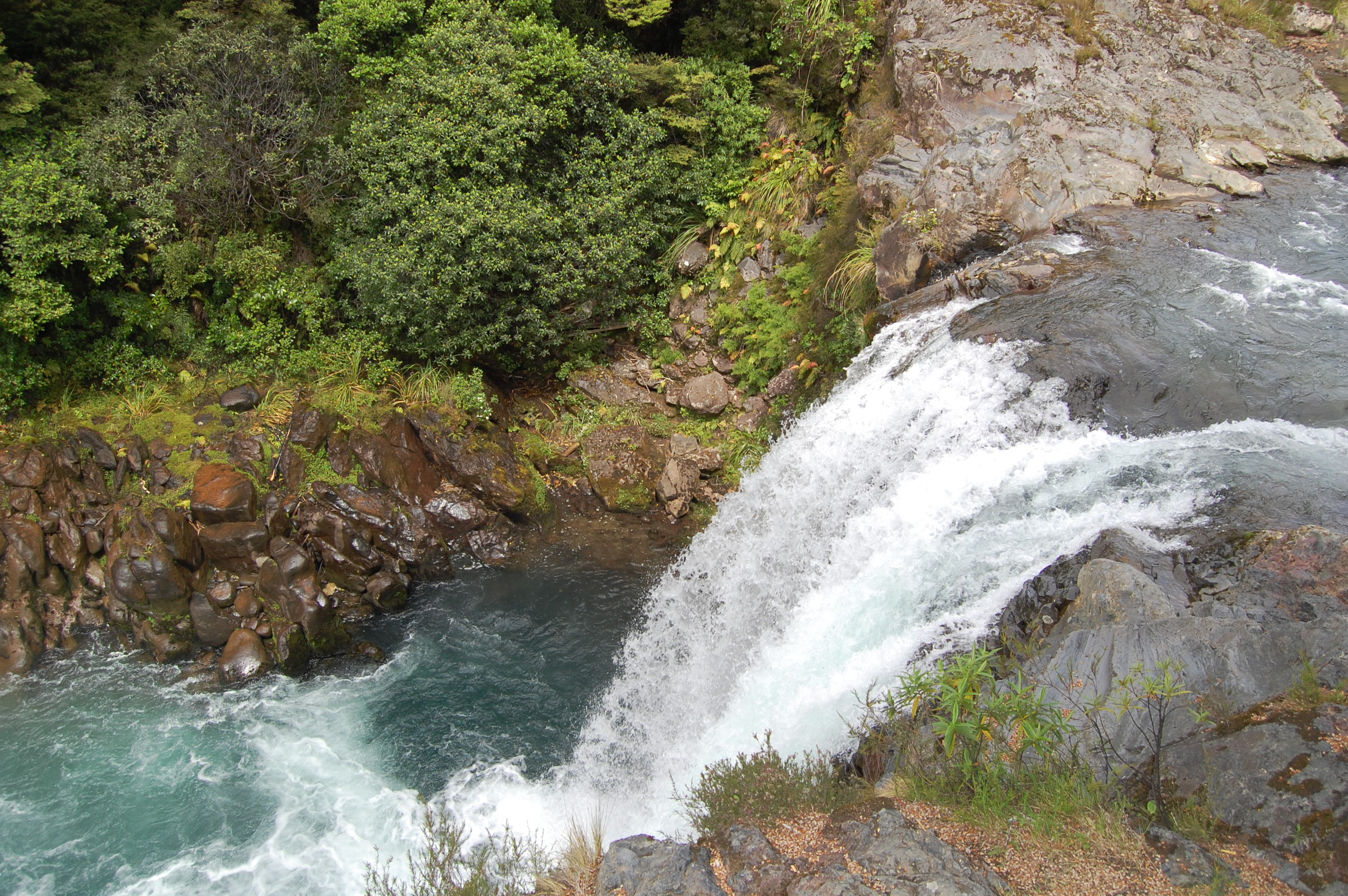
Tawhai Falls

Tributary Name	Length (km)	km From Mouth	Confluence Coordinates
Mount Ruapehu	River Source		39°15′40″S 175°33′50″E
Tepure Stream			39°03.54′S 175°23.78′E
Whanganui River	River Mouth	0 km	38°55′48″S 175°24′28″E

The river starts where the Whakapapaiti and Whakapapanui streams meet. They both run from Ruapehu and are joined by several other streams. These include the Waikare and Tawhai streams that join the Whakapapaiti stream before its confluence to form the river. The 13 m (43 ft) tall Tawhai Falls are on the Whakapapanui stream, rather than the Tawhai stream and are accessible by a walking track from the Bruce Road. The upper stream catchment has had several lahars run down them in the last 10,000 years, including 1969 and 1975. There was a major sector collapse without eruption of Ruapehu about 9500 years ago that impacted on the upper catchment.

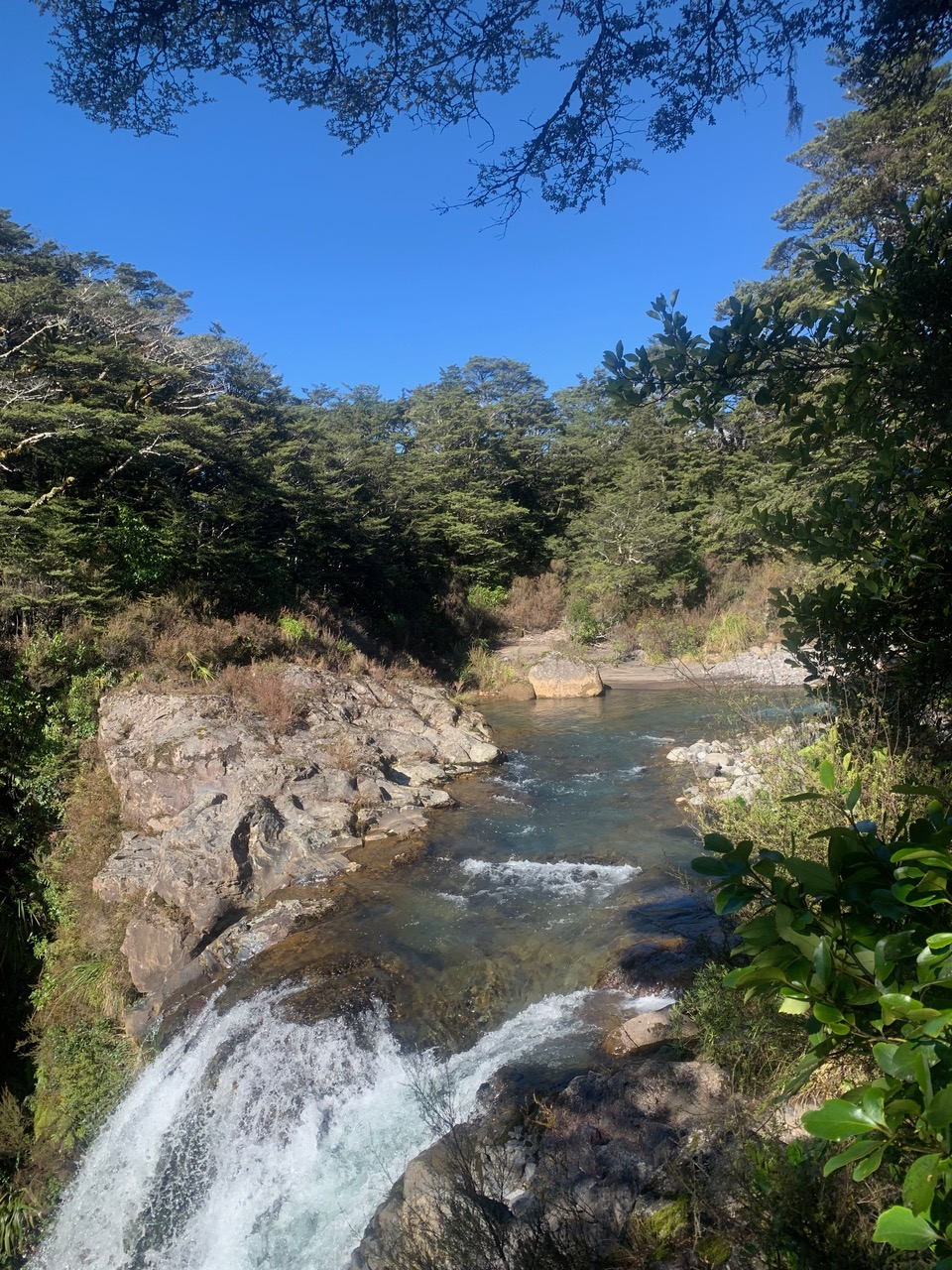
Whakapapanui stream above Tawhai Falls

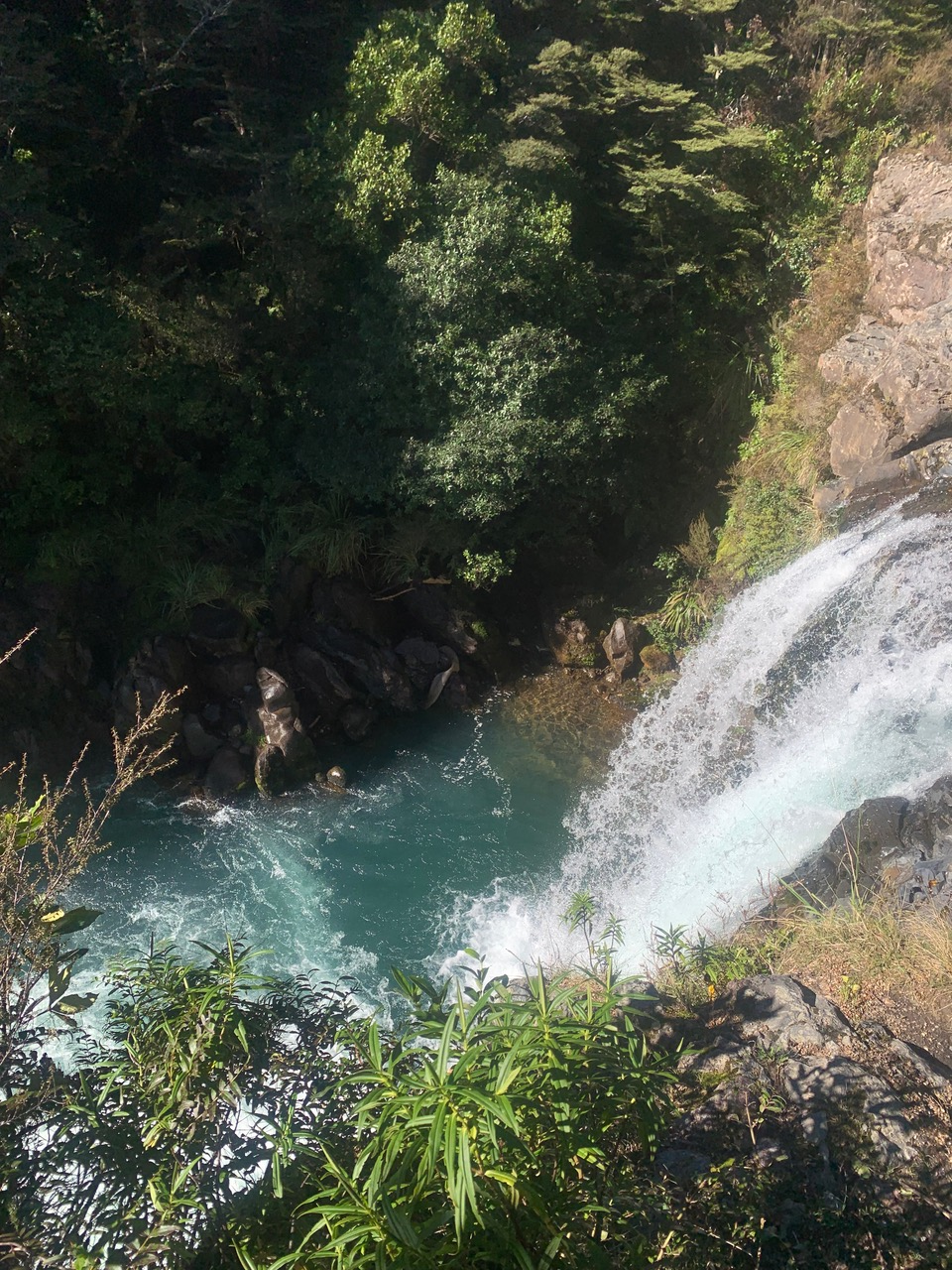
Plunge pool below Tawhai Falls
