= Edward Earle Vaile =

Edward Earle Vaile OBE (3 March 1869 – 11 January 1956) was a real estate agent, farmer, philanthropist, author, railway campaigner and a pioneer of the pumice country - Broadlands, North Island, New Zealand.

Vaile was born at Hampstead, London, England in 1869. He was a very strong advocate for the building of a government railway between Rotorua and Taupo via Waiotapu and Reporoa. From 1911 onwards he led campaigns and lobbied vigorously for many years to have a railway built between Rotorua and Taupo. He formed and led the Rotorua Taupo Railway League and the Reporoa Railway League, and in 1928 published a campaign pamphlet advocating the construction of a railway between Rotorua and Taupo. In 1929 published another campaign pamphlet titled "The truth about the Taupo railway - the story of a great crime" advocating the need for and the numerous benefits such a line would bring, in response to the government stopping the project in that year. He stood in the 1931 election in the Rotorua electorate as an independent supporter of the Reform Party with the construction of the line as his main issue. The United and Reform Parties had formed the United/Reform Coalition, and Vaile was heavily beaten by both the official coalition and the Labour candidates.

In the 1952 Queen's Birthday Honours, Vaile was appointed an Officer of the Order of the British Empire, for services to the community in Auckland.

== Bibliography ==
- Encyclopedia of New Zealand 1966, A. H. McLintock; Government Printer, Wellington, 1966
- Pioneering the Pumice, E. Earle Vaile; Whitcombe and Tombs Limited, 1939
- Some Interesting Occurrences in Early Auckland City and Provinces, E Earle Vaile; Whitcombe and Tombs Limited, 1955
- The New Century in Rotorua, D. M. Stafford/Rotorua District Council; Ray Richards Publisher, Auckland, 1988
- Don Stafford Collection – Railways; Rotorua Public Library, Rotorua
- Rotorua Taupo Railway League campaign pamphlet; Rotorua Taupo Railway League, 1928
- The Truth about the Taupo Railway - The Story of a Great Crime pamphlet; Rotorua Taupo Railway League, 1929
- Waitakere City Council - Waikumete Cemetery records
