= Peter McIntyre (artist) =

New Zealand artist

Peter McIntyre OBE
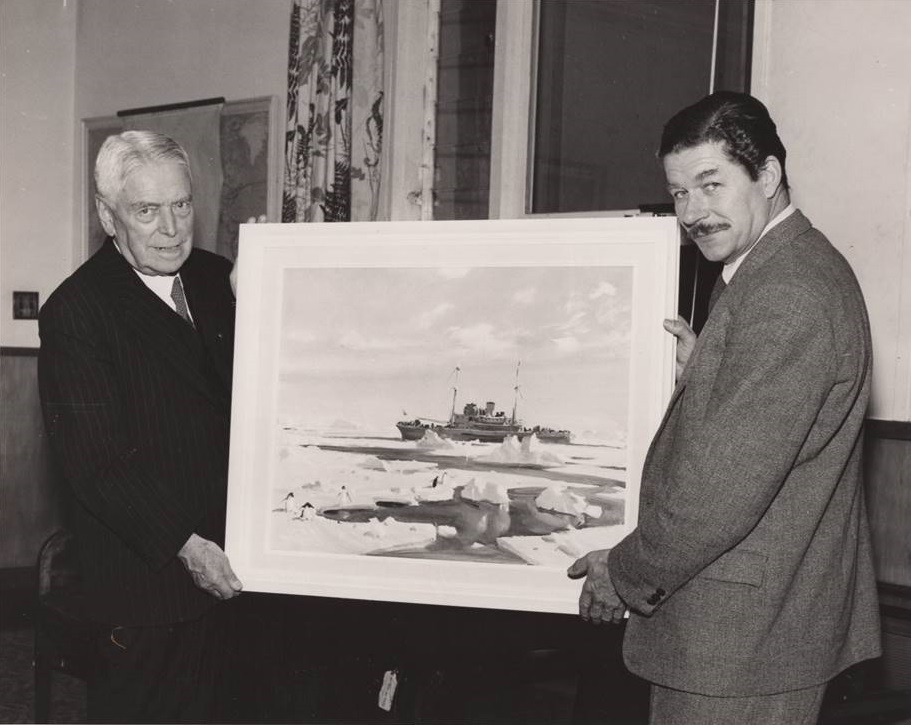
- McIntyre (right) with Prime Minister Walter Nash in May 1958
- Born: 4 July 1910; Dunedin, New Zealand
- Died: 11 September 1995 (aged 85); Wellington, New Zealand
- Education: Slade School of Fine Art
- Known for: War art Watercolour

Peter McIntyre OBE (4 July 1910 – 11 September 1995) was a New Zealand painter and author who rose to prominence as a result of artwork produced in his capacity as an official war artist during the Second World War.

Born in Dunedin, McIntyre commenced a journalism degree at the University of Otago but abandoned his studies and went to England in 1931 to attend the Slade School of Fine Art. After graduating he worked as a commercial artist in London. At the outbreak of the Second World War, he enlisted in the Second New Zealand Expeditionary Force (2NZEF) and was posted to the 34th Anti-tank Battery. By 1940, he was serving in the Middle East with the 2nd New Zealand Division, where his artwork caught the attention of Major General Bernard Freyberg, the commander of the 2NZEF. Freyberg appointed him the official war artist of the 2NZEF, and McIntyre went on to produce many notable works depicting the efforts of the 2nd New Zealand Division during the war, including major engagements in Egypt, Libya, Tunisia and Italy.

After the war, McIntyre returned to New Zealand and worked as a professional painter. In his later years, he produced an autobiography and a number of art books, covering topics such as New Zealand, the Pacific Islands, and his war art. These helped maintain his high profile in New Zealand and in 1970 he was appointed an Officer of the Order of the British Empire. He died in Wellington in 1995, aged 85, one of the country's best known artists.

== Early life ==
Peter McIntyre was born in Dunedin, New Zealand, on 4 July 1910, the son of Peter McIntyre, an emigrant from Scotland, and his wife, Isabella Edith Cubitt. His father, a co-founder of the Caxton Printing Company, was well known for his lithographs and work in watercolours, and also worked as a cartoonist for the Otago Daily Times. He was educated at Otago Boys' High School and, encouraged by his father, received instruction in art from Alfred O'Keeffe, a local artist, executing several works for family and friends. After completing his schooling, he then went to the University of Otago, to study journalism. However, by 1931, McIntyre had decided to pursue art studies and abandoned his courses in New Zealand.

== London ==
Initially funded by his family, McIntyre went to London where he attended the Slade School of Fine Art, studying for a Bachelor of Fine Arts. His work at this time was influenced by the likes of Russell Flint, Maurice Greiffenhagen and Alfred Munnings. He enjoyed life in London, mixing with fellow students and attending exhibitions. Despite limited income, he often travelled to mainland Europe and painted scenes in France, Germany, Italy and Spain. In 1934, his final year of studies at Slade, he won prizes in composition and figure drawing.

Following his graduation, McIntyre remained in London and worked as a free-lance commercial artist. The 1930s in Britain were difficult due to the state of the economy and work was not easy to come across. As a consequence, his output was varied; he did art for theatre productions, murals for restaurants, and serials for woman's magazines. He also did his own contemporary work in modern styles such as French cubism and English avant-garde. (Note: Unfortunately, these works, stored in a warehouse in London, were later destroyed during the Second World War.) In 1937, he married an Englishwoman, Lillian née Welbourn, herself a painter in addition to being a model.

== Second World War ==
On the outbreak of the Second World War, McIntyre attempted to enlist in the British Army but was declined. He soon found out that New Zealand expatriates were able to join a section of the 2nd New Zealand Expeditionary Force (2NZEF) that was being raised in London. He promptly enlisted, seeking "the promise of excitement after a decade of paralysis, the doldrum thirties". The London section of the 2NZEF became the 34th Anti-tank Battery which received its training at Aldershot. In April 1940, the unit left England for Egypt, where it was initially based at Maadi Camp, on the outskirts of Cairo, and attached to the 2nd New Zealand Division.

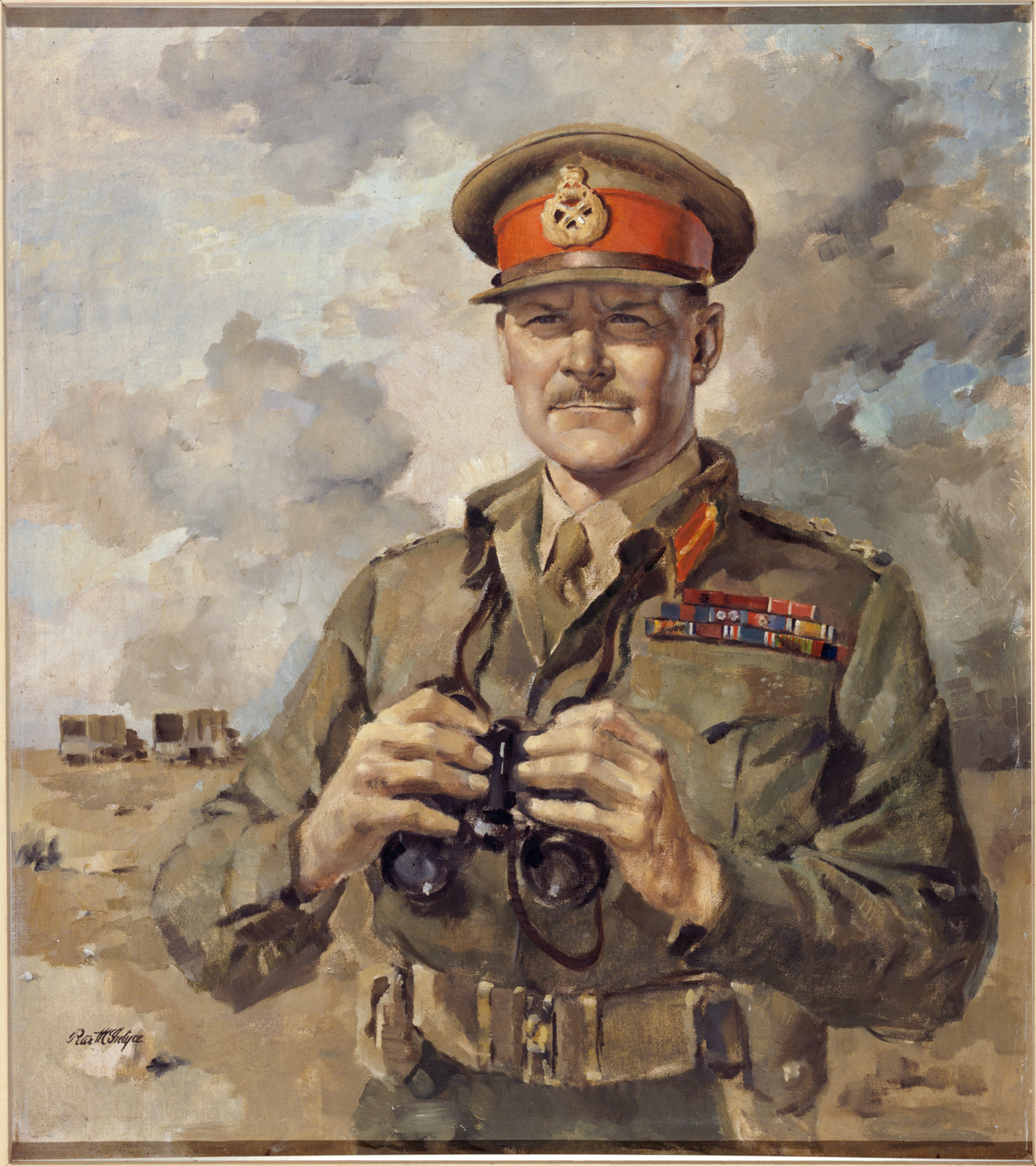
McIntyre's portrait of Major General Bernard Freyberg, who selected him to be the official war artist of the 2NZEF

While in Egypt, McIntyre's artistic skills were soon recognised. He provided drawings for Parade, a military magazine and was invited to prepare artwork to form the basis of a security poster. The artwork was later used for a postcard and McIntyre also worked on the divisional Christmas card. On his own time, he also executed landscapes and portraits of fellow soldiers of the 2NZEF.

His skills soon saw him transferred to the draughting office at the headquarters of the 2nd New Zealand Division, preparing maps and drawings of Italian defensive positions based on aerial photographs. His workspace was surrounded by some of his own artwork which soon attracted the attention of the division's commander, Major General Bernard Freyberg. (Note: Some of his work from this period was given to another draughtsman of the 2NZEF who later settled in England. The art was forgotten for over 50 years until it was found by family. It was put up for sale in New Zealand in 2010.) For some time, the New Zealand government had been considering appointing an official war artist to record the exploits of its men at war but was yet to make a commitment. In January 1941, Freyberg, tiring of the lengthy appointment process, selected McIntyre as the official New Zealand war artist, promoting him to lieutenant at the same time.

In his new role, it was proposed that McIntyre would execute portraits of decorated soldiers, battle scenes, and a series on the life of a New Zealand soldier, both in the frontlines and in the rear areas. McIntyre's first orders from Freyberg were to paint portraits of the brigadiers of the 2nd New Zealand Division, a task of which he soon tired. However, he soon found that Freyberg allowed him plenty of leeway in what was to be produced.

=== Crete ===
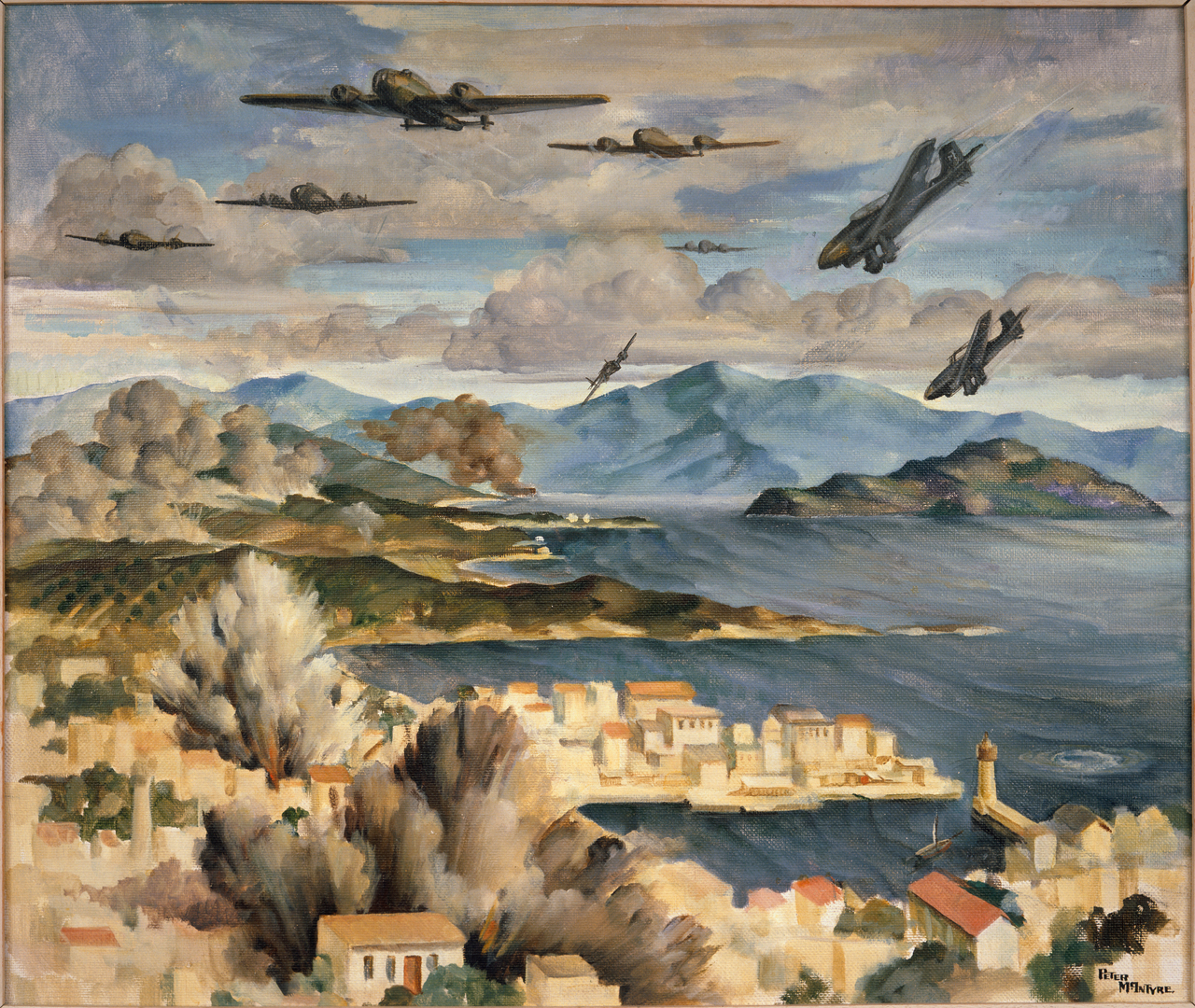
McIntyre's depiction of the airborne attack by German forces at Canea, a city on Crete

When the 2nd New Zealand Division was sent to Greece, as one of a number of Allied units dispatched to support the country in early March 1941 in anticipation of an invasion by Germany, McIntyre was ordered to remain in Egypt. Following the disastrous Allied campaign in Greece, the division was evacuated to Crete. He petitioned Freyberg for permission to be sent there, was successful, and arrived in Crete on 14 May. His first task was to paint a portrait of the King of Greece, who had been evacuated to the island. McIntyre was present during the airborne invasion of 20 May and it was at this time that he began to establish his methods for capturing events as they unfolded before him. He would work relatively close to the frontlines, executing sketches from which he would later work up paintings. In doing so, he moved away from his avant-garde influenced style and developed a romantic realism in his work.

From the fighting in Crete, McIntyre produced a number of notable works; landings of Fallschirmjäger (paratroopers), bombing of divisional field hospitals, and crashed German gliders. The latter images featured German war dead; he did not depict New Zealand dead although he would show wounded. On returning to Egypt after the division had been evacuated from Crete at the end of May, several of McIntyre's works were published in Parade magazine. He was not able to bring with him all his paintings; some of the larger watercolours had to be abandoned in Crete.

=== North Africa ===
In Egypt, McIntyre's initial focus was converting the many sketches he had made on Crete into proper paintings. Impressed by the output, Freyberg promoted him to captain. The first exhibition of his work was held in Cairo in July 1941 and some of his work was also used to illustrate an article in the Illustrated London News later in the year. The 2nd New Zealand Division was in the process of being rebuilt following the campaigns in Greece and Crete and McIntyre captured aspects of this process; he depicted many scenes of camp life and the daily activities. When authorities announced the award of the Victoria Cross to Lieutenant Charles Upham of the 20th Battalion, McIntyre was instructed to undertake a portrait of him. When the division moved to the front to participate in Operation Crusader, McIntyre went with it, sketching battle scenes and depictions of New Zealanders on the move. He was among those who were able to get into Tobruk and once there made several sketches and paintings of the besieged port.

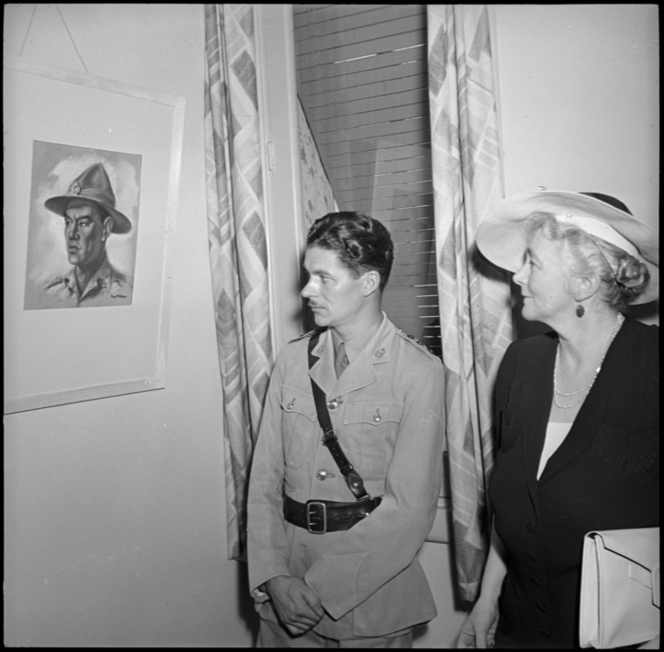
McIntyre with Lady Wavell, the wife of General Archibald Wavell, at an exhibition of his work in Cairo, 1941

After Operation Crusader, McIntyre returned to Egypt and spent time working up his sketches into completed paintings. Another exhibition of his work was held in Cairo in April 1942, which was well received. He then spent time with the Long Range Desert Group, which had many New Zealanders serving with it. He would produce several works from this experience, describing the desert as "the most fascinating country to paint that I had ever seen".

In June 1942, the 2nd New Zealand Division was heavily engaged at Minqar Qaim, where it had been encircled by the Axis forces but successfully broke out. It then fought in the First Battle of El Alamein. Notable works were produced by McIntyre during this period; he would often focus on the comradeship of the New Zealand soldiers. Following the withdrawal of the Axis forces into Libya and then Tunisia, the 2nd New Zealand Division, along with the rest of the British 8th Army, and McIntyre followed, painting along the way. He was present for the victory parade at Tripoli on 4 February 1943, at the behest of Freyberg who wanted a painting of the parade to be presented to Winston Churchill, also present at Tripoli. McIntyre was unable to produce a satisfactory painting and instead worked up sketches instead.

=== Furlough to New Zealand ===
With the war in Africa over following the surrender of the Axis forces there, in July 1943 the first group of long serving soldiers of the 2NZEF were returning to New Zealand on furlough. McIntyre went with them, for his first visit to the country for 12 years. During his time there, his war art were exhibited around the country. Several had already been reproduced as prints but this was the first time the originals had been exhibited in New Zealand.

Beginning in Dunedin, McIntyre's home town, he gave a series of talks about his work and experiences with the 2NZEF. The exhibition moved onto Christchurch, Wellington and then Auckland. At the latter city, the paintings were displayed from 30 November to 3 January 1944 at the Auckland Art Gallery and were seen by over 28,000 people. Selected pieces of McIntyre's art work were used by the New Zealand publishing company A.H. Reed Limited, to illustrate Passage to Tobruk, a memoir by Francis Jackson that was published under Reed's Raupo imprint.

=== Italy ===
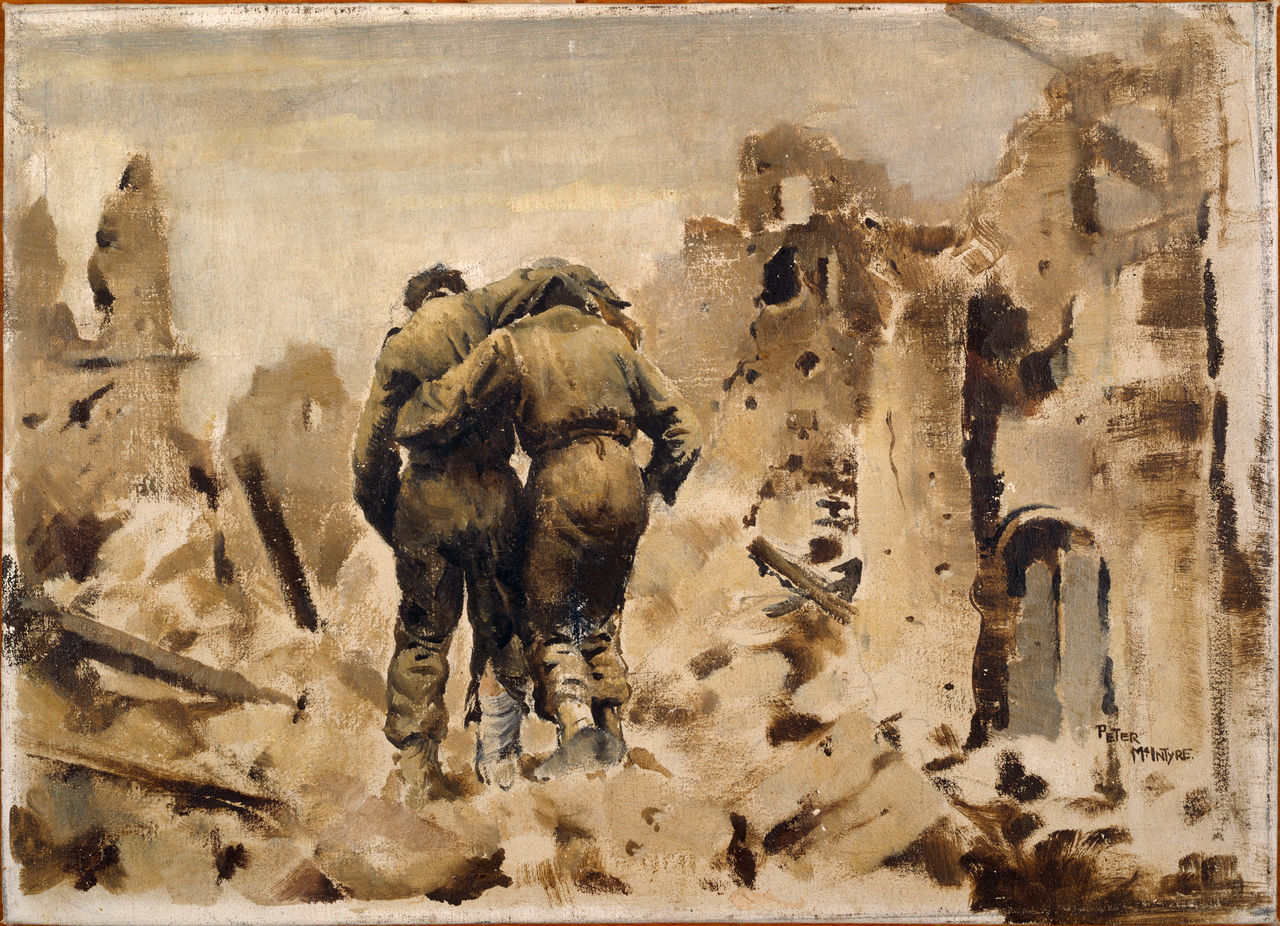
Wounded at Cassino, one of the most "iconic" of McIntyre's war paintings

McIntyre left for Egypt on 12 January, intending to go onto to Italy where the 2nd New Zealand Division was engaged in the Italian campaign. However, while in Egypt he became ill with pneumonia and had to be hospitalised. It was not until March 1944 that McIntyre headed for Cassino, where the division was involved in heavy fighting. Some of his most notable war art was produced at this time, including depictions of the controversial bombing of the Cassino Monastery. He was in Rome shortly after the city's liberation by American forces, where at Freyberg's request he executed a portrait of Pope Pius XII. For most of the remainder of the war he followed the 2nd New Zealand Division as it advanced up Italy.

Later in the year McIntyre went to London to put on an exhibition of the work he had produced during the Italian campaign, which totalled 39 paintings. It was well attended, with viewers including Noël Coward, the 7th Duke of Wellington, and General Ian Hamilton. Sir Russell Flint commented favourably on McIntyre's work. At the end of the exhibition, he travelled to France, linking up with New Zealand personnel serving in the Royal Air Force, before making his way back to Italy in time to see the end of the war there. Promoted to major on 6 May 1945, McIntyre was not immediately repatriated to New Zealand, instead remaining for several months around the Mediterranean. During this time, he visited Trieste, Florence, monasteries in Italy and Greece, returned to Crete, before receiving his discharge orders at the end of the year.

== Later life ==
Arriving in Dunedin in February 1946, McIntyre set up a studio on the city's Princes Street and started working full-time on commissioned portraits and landscapes. He later conceded that he "had great difficulty in adjusting myself to peacetime painting after the hurlyburly of war". He had planned on establishing a school for the arts beginning with the development of a community of like-minded artists. However, this proved to be a challenge as he found the local art scene to be amateurish. He was somewhat disparaging of the local art scene, considering it to merely replicate the painting styles of British and European artists. In return, many established local artists, such as Toss Woollaston and Colin McCahon who were both pacifists, decried the fact that McIntyre's reputation was based on his war art.

In early 1949, his marriage to Lillian McIntyre ended in divorce and he promptly remarried. He and his new wife, Patricia née Miles, soon moved to Wellington, where he based himself in Mount Victoria. His first showing there was successful, in contrast to a failed exhibition he had in Dunedin before the shift north. Among the purchasers of his work was Freyberg, who was now the Governor-General of New Zealand. As a result of his marriage, he admitted to being much more settled and taking painting more seriously. He was successful in art competitions, placing third in the 1957 Kelliher Art Award with a landscape of the Rangitikei River and winning outright two years later with a scene of Dunedin's Octagon. He was third again in 1960, 1961, and 1963. In 1953, McIntyre was awarded the Queen Elizabeth II Coronation Medal.

=== Publications ===
In 1962 McIntyre was approached by Ray Richards, of A.H. Reed Limited, with a suggestion of writing a book on his career. This resulted in The Painted Years, the first of several books authored and illustrated by McIntyre. It was a success, and led to his commissioning by Reed to produce a volume with landscapes of New Zealand. This was Peter McIntyre's New Zealand, published in 1964. The first print run of 5,000 sold out within days. The book was particularly important in highlighting the work of a local artist in New Zealand, bringing his work to the attention of a wider audience, and would remain in print for 20 years. His next book, Peter McIntyre's Pacific, published in 1966, was also a success and ended up being distributed into the United States. A Californian company, Lane Publishing Company, partnered with Reed and McIntyre to produce Peter McIntyre's West, containing scenes from the western states. This was published in 1970, selling over 27,000 copies and boosting McIntyre's profile in the United States.

A particularly personal project for McIntyre was Kakahi. Named for the small town of Kākahi in the King Country where he owned a holiday home, the book highlighted themes of conservation and rural landscapes. McIntyre's daughter would later note of Kākahi, that her father was "very content here". McIntyre's Country was published in 1979 and the last of his books was Peter McIntyre: War Artist. This was published in 1981 and returned his war art to the public eye.

After journalists made enquiries, it was found that the works executed by the official war artists during the Second World War, and which were the property of the New Zealand government, had been widely dispersed throughout the country. Many were displayed at Returned Services Associations, regional museums, and government departments without thought given to their care. The poor condition of many works resulted in public criticism being directed towards the nominal custodian of the works, the Department of Internal Affairs. After initially claiming it lacked hanging space for them, it set about centralising the war artist's work to the National Archives. It transpired that of the 160 Mcintyre works in the collection, 40 needed some restoration work.

== Final years and legacy ==
McIntyre's work remained of public interest, with high prices paid throughout the 1970s and 1980s for his paintings. In 1983, at an Auckland exhibition of his paintings of Venice scenes, he achieved over $110,000 in sales. Two years later, in recognition of his work, he was awarded the Governor General’s Art Award. Several years earlier he had been appointed an Officer of the Order of the British Empire for services to the arts. He died in Wellington on 11 September 1995, survived by his wife and two children. Earlier in the year, Wellington City Gallery held an exhibition of his war art; over 22,000 people had viewed his work by the time of his death.

For many New Zealanders, McIntyre's work was their first introduction to local art and he was well known across the country. His paintings continue to be sought after; an auction held in November 2015 of paintings of farming scenes fetched prices well above of what was expected. An exhibition of his paintings of Kākahi was held in Wellington in February 2021.

== Notes ==
Footnotes

Citations
