= Kakahi, New Zealand =

Settlement in King Country, New Zealand

Kakahi
- Rural community
- Interactive map of Kakahi
- Country: New Zealand
- Region: Manawatū-Whanganui
- District: Ruapehu District
- Ward: Ruapehu General Ward; Ruapehu Māori Ward
- Community: Taumarunui-Ōhura Community
- Electorates: Whanganui; Te Tai Hauāuru (Māori)

Government
  - Territorial Authority: Ruapehu District Council
  - Regional council: Horizons Regional Council
  - Mayor of Ruapehu: Weston Kirton
  - Whanganui MP: Carl Bates
  - Te Tai Hauāuru MP: Debbie Ngarewa-Packer

Area
  - Total: 83.56 km^{2} (32.26 sq mi)

Population (2023 Census)
  - Total: 147
  - Density: 1.76/km^{2} (4.56/sq mi)

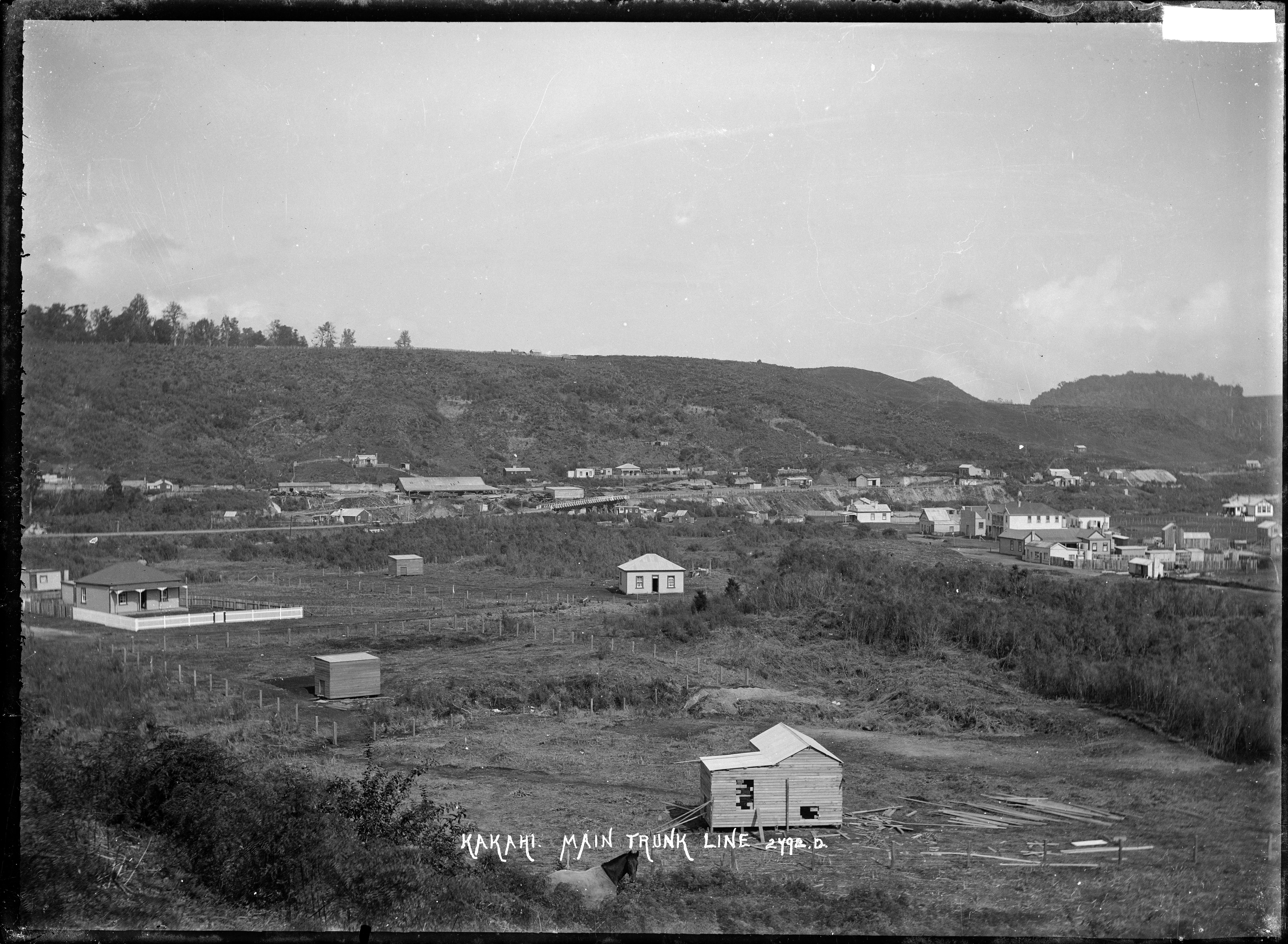
Kakahi in the early 1900s

Kakahi (Māori: Kākahi)) is a small King Country settlement about 10 kilometres (6.2 mi) up the Whanganui River from Taumarunui, New Zealand. Founded as a sawmill town, it takes its name from the Māori word for the New Zealand freshwater mussel.

== Geography ==

Kakahi can be reached from State Highway 4, and the North Island Main Trunk railway passes through it across a bridge over the Kakahi Stream; a railway station was open from 1904 to 1978. The Whanganui River and Whakapapa River meet about 1.5 kilometres (0.93 mi) to the east, and a similar distance down the Whakapapa River from the end of Te Rena Road (an old logging tram line). Te Rena Road is notable for extensive colonies of glowworms along the sheer banks where the road cuts deeply through the hillside.

== History ==
=== Early history ===
Kakahi has a long history of Māori settlement, and four fortified pā sites. In about the 15th century, Ngāti Hotu people were defeated here by Whanganui Māori in the battle of the five forts.

In February 1862 James Coutts Crawford crossed the Whakapapa River and camped across from Terena.

=== 20th century ===
Last century Kakahi was a King Country sawmill town, with four timber mills around the township, many tram lines for moving the timber (mainly tōtara). Kakahi also had three churches, one hotel (burned to the ground), one boarding house and a pool hall. The Kakahi Primary School closure had a serious impact on population numbers, the Kakahi General Store and post office, and the new Kakahi Hall.

In 1906, Ngāti Tūwharetoa and the Tongariro Timber Company struck an agreement for the construction of a 40-mile (64 km) Kakahi to Pukawa railway line, connecting the main trunk line to the shores of Lake Taupō. This was in exchange for the milling rights of 134,500 acres (544 km^{2}) of land, and other considerations. Subsequently, in 1908 a case was put to the Stout Ngata Commission over the lack of action. By May 1929 this line had still not been built and the government acquired the Tongariro Timber Company. A road was deemed at being more viable. The Tongariro Timber Company railway land was finally disposed by the New Zealand Parliament in the Māori Purposes Act.

In 1922 Te Rena School is closed.

In 1923 Lake Falconer Ayson, Chief Inspector of Fisheries, visits the Kakahi hatcheries, to liberate half a million Atlantic salmon fry into the Whanganui River, Whakapapa River, Kakahi Stream, Punga Punga Stream and other tributaries. These fry were successfully hatched in the Kakahi hatchery by Mr. Bebbington.

=== Modern history ===
The Kakahi Town Hall was commissioned by one of the local timber milling businesses and was used as a silent movies cinema and dance hall. It still retains its piano, fireproof celluloid film projection room, and copper tubing in the ceiling for the "white spirit" internal lighting system.

Other commercial buildings that remain but are not used for their original purpose are the butchery, bakery (complete with retired bread oven), the original post office and a blacksmith's stables. The Kakahi bakers were known for trucking their hot bread widely in the region, and even supplied many of the bush mills in the hills as far away as National Park. The expression "the best thing since sliced bread" belies the fact that many small bakers could not afford the expensive patented (and sometimes unreliable) bread slicers. This was a contributing factor in the closing of bakers here.

Kakahi had a general store run by the Lala family from 1937. Manu Lala, who ran it from 1957 after taking it over from his father, was to close it in June 2026 at the age of 85.

The Kakahi area is noted for trout fly fishing.

=== Marae ===
Kākahi Marae and its Taumaihiorongo meeting house, built in 1913, are a meeting place for the Ngāti Tūwharetoa hapū of Ngāti Manunui. A Catholic church, complete with a bell tower, stands on the edge of the marae. In October 2020, the Government committed $1,338,668 from the Provincial Growth Fund to upgrade it and four other marae.

Te Rena Marae and Hikairo meeting house, located near Kakahi, is a meeting place for the Ngāti Tūwharetoa hapū of Ngāti Hikairo. In October 2020, the Government committed $1,560,379 to upgrade it and 7 other nearby marae.

== Demographics ==
Kakahi locality covers 83.56 km^{2} (32.26 sq mi). The locality is part of the larger Ngapuke statistical area.

Historical population
Year	Pop.	±% p.a.
2006	177	—
2013	138	−3.49%
2018	111	−4.26%
2023	147	+5.78%

Kakahi had a population of 147 in the 2023 New Zealand census, an increase of 36 people (32.4%) since the 2018 census, and an increase of 9 people (6.5%) since the 2013 census. There were 72 males and 75 females in 57 dwellings. 2.0% of people identified as LGBTIQ+. The median age was 45.1 years (compared with 38.1 years nationally). There were 33 people (22.4%) aged under 15 years, 24 (16.3%) aged 15 to 29, 66 (44.9%) aged 30 to 64, and 27 (18.4%) aged 65 or older.

People could identify as more than one ethnicity. The results were 57.1% European (Pākehā); 65.3% Māori; 4.1% Pasifika; 2.0% Asian; and 2.0% Middle Eastern, Latin American and African New Zealanders (MELAA). English was spoken by 95.9%, Māori by 14.3%, and other languages by 4.1%. No language could be spoken by 4.1% (e.g. too young to talk). The percentage of people born overseas was 8.2, compared with 28.8% nationally.

Religious affiliations were 32.7% Christian, 2.0% Hindu, 6.1% Māori religious beliefs, 2.0% Jewish, and 2.0% other religions. People who answered that they had no religion were 51.0%, and 8.2% of people did not answer the census question.

Of those at least 15 years old, 6 (5.3%) people had a bachelor's or higher degree, 63 (55.3%) had a post-high school certificate or diploma, and 42 (36.8%) people exclusively held high school qualifications. The median income was $27,800, compared with $41,500 nationally. 3 people (2.6%) earned over $100,000 compared to 12.1% nationally. The employment status of those at least 15 was 45 (39.5%) full-time, 12 (10.5%) part-time, and 6 (5.3%) unemployed.

== Sports ==
Hockey Team Colours
Blue	Gold

School Team Colours
Grey
Blue
Grey
Blue
Shorts/Skirt

The local sports teams are generally dressed in blue and gold. The Domain, a sports field to the north of the village, was the base of the Kakahi field hockey team, and regular motocross and the Kakahi rodeo Club competitions in the 1970s, which raised funds for community activities. Around the Domain are the remains of a racing bicycle track, part of which was washed away during the 1950s flood.

== Education ==
Kakahi School was opened in 1910 to account for an economic and industrial boom in the area. Kakahi School was a co-educational state primary school for Year 1 to 8 students. In 2015, nine students were reported on the school roll, by 2016 there were zero students on the roll. Kakahi School officially closed April 15, 2016.

== Notable people ==
- Keith Chapple (1944–2005), former Royal Forest and Bird Protection Society of New Zealand president.
- Peter McIntyre (1910–1995), official New Zealand war artist in WWII, had a holiday house at Kakahi, and published a 1972 book of paintings entitled Kakahi New Zealand.
