= Ngāti Wairangi (South Island iwi) =

Māori iwi (tribe) in New Zealand

Ngāti Wairangi was a Māori iwi (tribe). Its rohe (tribal area) covers the West Coast of the South Island of New Zealand.

It was the last Kāhui tribe to be integrated into Ngāi Tahu, the principal tribe of the South Island today. The West Coast was commonly known as Te Tai Poutini, named for a Taniwha who protected the people and pounamu of the region. They held control over Arahura, a settlement known for its deposits of pounamu (greenstone), which led to conflict as Ngāi Tahu conquered the South Island in the 1600s and 1700s.

== History ==
It is believed that the Ngāti Wairangi were a pre-Aotea tribe (originating from before when New Zealand was known as Aotearoa), migrating from the Taranaki Region to the West Coast in the first Waitaha migration south. Ngāti Wairangi was a relatively isolated tribe, as there were no known paths across the Southern Alps to the Canterbury Plains until Raureka discovered one crossing from west to east. The tribe eventually connected with Ngāi Tahu through multiple strategic marriages before eventual conflict between the two iwi that assimilated Ngāti Wairangi into Ngāi Tahu at the battle of Lake Mahinapua by the late 1700s. The region was invaded again by northern tribes in the 1830s, but Ngāi Tahu maintained control and still does to this day.
