= Tangiwai railway station =

Railway station in New Zealand

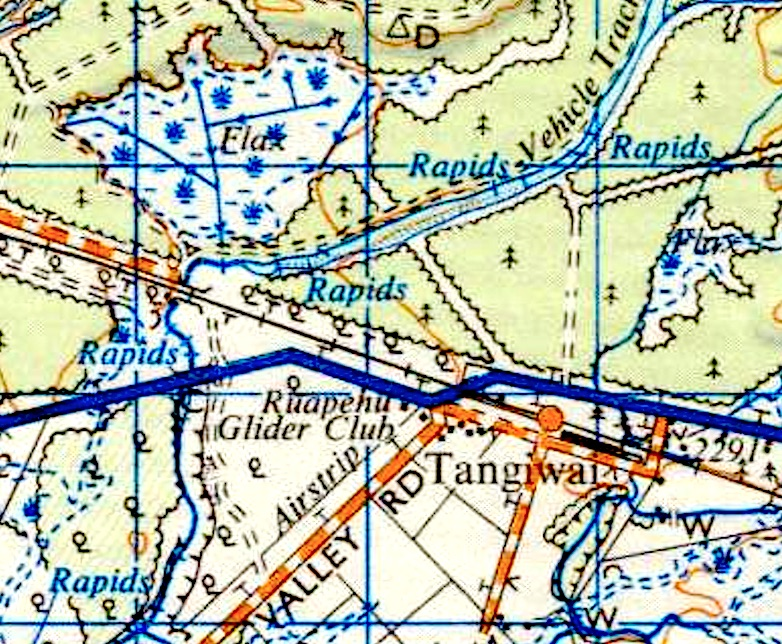
- Tangiwai railway station on 1966 map

General information
- Location: New Zealand
- Coordinates: 39.468628°S 175.593744°E
- Elevation: 700 m (2,300 ft)
- Line: North Island Main Trunk
- Distance: Wellington 299.49 km (186.09 mi)

History
- Opened: 12 August 1907
- Closed: goods 13 October 1986 passenger 26 November 1978
- Electrified: June 1988
- Former names: Waitangi until 24 July 1910

Services
Preceding station	Historical railways	Following station
Karioi; Line open, station closed 7.65 km (4.75 mi)	North Island Main Trunk; KiwiRail	Waiouru; Line open, station closed 9.19 km (5.71 mi)
Location

Tangiwai was a station on the North Island Main Trunk line, in the Ruapehu District of New Zealand. The station served the settlement of Tangiwai. The nearby pulp and saw mills are now one of the main sources of freight on NIMT. In 1953 the Tangiwai disaster occurred when the nearby bridge over the Whangaehu River was swept away.

Tangiwai has one of four substations supplying power to NIMT's electric trains.

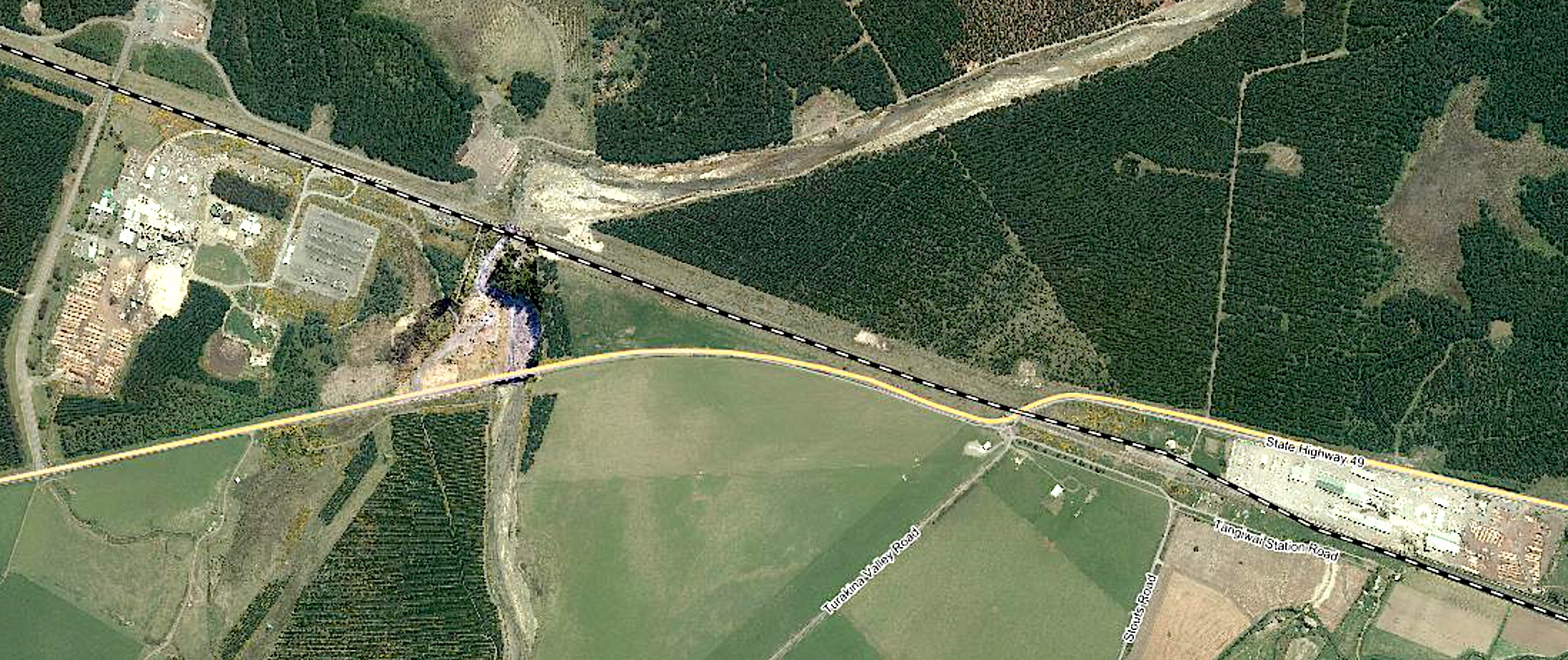
Tangiwai in 2011, showing pulp mill to west and sawmill and forest to north

== Name ==
On 24 July 1910 the name of Waitangi flag station was changed to Tangiwai. Karioi Forest extends to just north of the station, so that the nearby pulp mill is called Karioi, as was the more distant next station to the north-west. Waitangi Stream flows just to the south of the station.

== History ==
Surveying for the route between Hīhītahi and Piriaka began in 1894. An 1897 report noted ballast available at Waitangi and a temporary line opened to carry it and other building materials along the route by 1907. The ballast pit remained in use until 4 June 1946.

The line opened from Waiouru to Rangataua for goods traffic on 12 August 1907. A 4th class station was built by March 1908 with a budget of £2,100. When opened it had rooms for a lobby, a tablet office, urinals and ladies, on a 200 ft (61 m) by 15 ft (4.6 m) platform. There was also a 20 ft (6.1 m) by 30 ft (9.1 m) goods shed with verandah, a loading bank, cattle yards, two 4,000 imp gal (18,000 L) water tanks and a cart approach. On 15 May 1910 the goods shed burnt down and on 1 April 1912 the station was damaged by fire. Cottages for railway staff were built from 1904 to 1954. A crossing loop could take 54 wagons, extended to 85 wagons in 1946 for £263 and to 126 wagons in 1980. There was a Post Office at the station from 1913 to 1967. The station building was sold for $30 in 1971, though still mentioned as being in place in 1973. The stockyards were leased out from 21 July 1980.

== Bridges ==
Waitangi Stream to the east of the station is bridged by two spans of 22 ft (6.7 m). Wangaehu River to the west is crossed by two spans of 44 ft (13 m) and five of 22 ft (6.7 m). Both were built with plate girders made in England.

== Timber traffic ==
George Syme's sawmill was linked to the station by a 1 1/4 mi (2.0 km) tramway from 1908 until 1930. It was worked by an A Class 0-4-0 shunter until about 1928 and then an 1870s vertical boilered 0-4-0, built in Auckland by Fraser & Tinne. Traffic ran to the company's Egmont Sash and Door factory at Hāwera.

Tangiwai Sawmill was built beside the railway station in 1966, when the station was open continuously and had 3 staff. In 1979 by Karioi Pulp Mill, almost 3 km (1.9 mi) north of the sawmill, began production, using rail from the start. The pulp travels in 4-tonne packs, previously on ZH wagons, but now increasingly loaded on 38-tonne ZHC Class box wagons, which have been converted from ZA Class wagons since 2012. Exports were through ports at New Plymouth, then Wellington and, since 2014, Napier, using 3 sets of wagons.

In 1970 private sidings for the sawmill were built to hold two rows of 29 wagons each. However, the station closed to all traffic on 13 October 1986, so that by 2009 the sidings were disused and up to 3,000 trucks a year carried the timber to Wellington. A government grant switched the traffic back to rail, so the milled timber is now added to the daily train from the pulp mill. A DSA class shunter has worked in the yard at Karioi since 1990.

== Incidents ==
A Silver Fern railcar, RM 18, collided with a stock truck at the SH49 level crossing on 24 January 1989.
