= Tangiwai =

Rural community in Manawatū-Whanganui Region, New Zealand

- Rural community
- Interactive map of Tangiwai
- Coordinates: 39.465856°S 175.576329°E
- Country: New Zealand
- Region: Manawatū-Whanganui
- District: Ruapehu District
- Ward: Ruapehu General Ward; Ruapehu Māori Ward
- Community: Waimarino-Waiouru Community
- Electorates: Whanganui; Te Tai Hauāuru (Māori)

Government
  - Territorial Authority: Ruapehu District Council
  - Regional council: Horizons Regional Council
  - Mayor of Ruapehu: Weston Kirton
  - Whanganui MP: Carl Bates
  - Te Tai Hauāuru MP: Debbie Ngarewa-Packer
- Postcode(s): 4691

Tangiwai is a 2,696.66-square-kilometre (1,040-square-mile) census area and a small rural community in the Ruapehu District of the Manawatū-Whanganui region of New Zealand's North Island. It is located east of Ohakune and Rangataua and west of Waiouru on State Highway 49. In 2018, 37.5% of the area's 1,281 residents worked in agriculture, forestry and fishing and 7.1% in manufacturing.

The New Zealand Ministry for Culture and Heritage gives a translation of "weeping water" for Tangiwai.

New Zealand's worst rail accident, the Tangiwai disaster, occurred near Tangiwai on 24 December 1953. The Whangaehu River rail bridge collapsed beneath a Wellington-to-Auckland express passenger train. The locomotive and first six carriages derailed into the river, killing 151 people. The subsequent Board of Inquiry found that the accident was caused by the collapse of the tephra dam holding back nearby Mount Ruapehu's crater lake, creating a large lahar in the Whangaehu River, which destroyed one of the bridge piers at Tangiwai only minutes before the train reached the bridge. A memorial has been built at the accident site.

Tirorangi Marae and Rangiteauria meeting house is located in the Tangiwai area. It is a traditional meeting ground of the Ngāti Rangi hapū of Ngāti Rangihaereroa, Ngāti Rangiteauria and Ngāti Tongaiti.

== Demographics ==
Tangiwai statistical area, which includes Rangataua and which surrounds but does not include Raetihi, Ohakune and Waiouru, covers 2,696.66 square kilometres (1,041.19 sq mi). It had an estimated population of 1,490 as of June 2025, with a population density of 0.55 people per km^{2}.

Historical population for the statistical area
Year	Pop.	±% p.a.
2006	1,368	—
2013	1,227	−1.54%
2018	1,281	+0.87%
2023	1,449	+2.50%

The statistical area had a population of 1,449 in the 2023 New Zealand census, an increase of 168 people (13.1%) since the 2018 census, and an increase of 222 people (18.1%) since the 2013 census. There were 786 males, 660 females, and 3 people of other genders in 627 dwellings. 1.4% of people identified as LGBTIQ+. The median age was 41.2 years (compared with 38.1 years nationally). There were 300 people (20.7%) aged under 15 years, 210 (14.5%) aged 15 to 29, 696 (48.0%) aged 30 to 64, and 240 (16.6%) aged 65 or older.

People could identify as more than one ethnicity. The results were 78.9% European (Pākehā); 36.2% Māori; 2.7% Pasifika; 3.3% Asian; 0.6% Middle Eastern, Latin American and African New Zealanders (MELAA); and 2.9% other, which includes people giving their ethnicity as "New Zealander". English was spoken by 96.9%, Māori by 6.2%, and other languages by 5.4%. No language could be spoken by 2.1% (e.g. too young to talk). New Zealand Sign Language was known by 0.4%. The percentage of people born overseas was 10.4, compared with 28.8% nationally.

Religious affiliations were 27.5% Christian, 0.2% Hindu, 0.2% Islam, 5.2% Māori religious beliefs, 0.4% Buddhist, 0.2% New Age, and 0.4% other religions. People who answered that they had no religion were 57.6%, and 8.5% of people did not answer the census question.

Of those at least 15 years old, 168 (14.6%) people had a bachelor's or higher degree, 705 (61.4%) had a post-high school certificate or diploma, and 276 (24.0%) people exclusively held high school qualifications. The median income was $42,100, compared with $41,500 nationally. 123 people (10.7%) earned over $100,000 compared to 12.1% nationally. The employment status of those at least 15 was 645 (56.1%) full-time, 186 (16.2%) part-time, and 27 (2.3%) unemployed.

== Timber ==
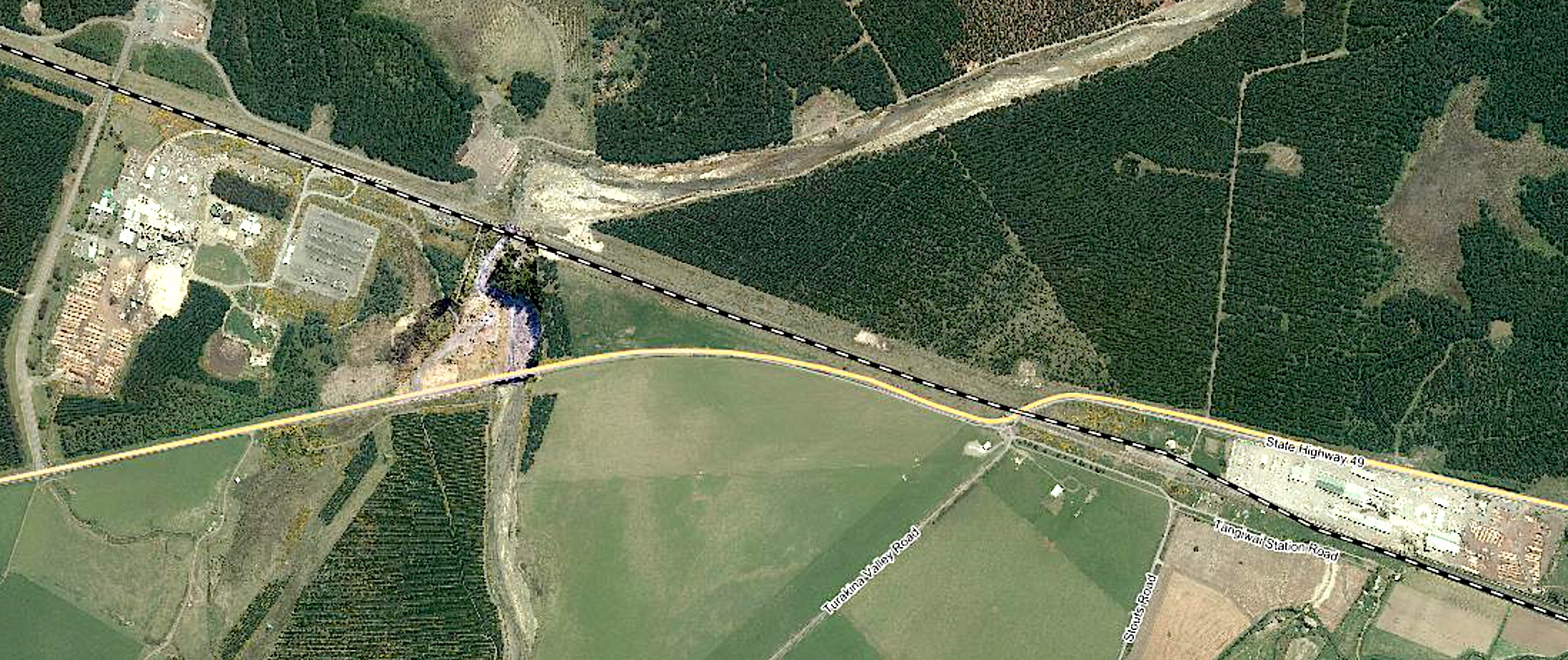
Tangiwai in 2011, showing pulp mill to west and timber mill and forest to the north of the railway

George Syme & Co ran a saw mill to cut totara, rimu, matai and kahikatea, linked to the station by a 1 1/4-mile (2.0-kilometre) tramway from 1908 until 1930. The mill burnt down in 1926.

Karioi state forest was set up in November 1926, with 33,516 acres (52.369 sq mi; 135.63 km^{2}) set aside for forestry, and taken on by New Zealand Forest Service from 31 March 1927. It stretches about 12 km (7.5 mi) north east from Tangiwai onto the southern slopes of Ruapehu. By March 1931, over 10.7m trees had been planted on 11,650 acres (4,710 ha), for £56,524, 15s 10d. Most of the planting was on land with cobalt deficiency and therefore considered unsuitable for farming, though it also included at least 700 acres (1.1 sq mi; 2.8 km^{2}) of flax. Trees have been harvested since the late 1960s. Winstone Pulp International (WPI) bought 13,893 ha (34,330 acres) of Waimarino Forest in 1989 and cutting rights to 11,056 ha (27,320 acres; 110.56 km^{2}) of Karioi Forest in 1990.

=== Sawmill ===
To cut the timber, MSD Spiers built Tangiwai Sawmill beside the railway station in 1966. It was bought by nearby pulp mill owner, Winstone Pulp International, in 1993 and upgraded to mill over 100,000 cubic metres (3,500,000 cubic feet) a year, using 200,000 m^{3} (7,100,000 cu ft) of logs, a planer, optimiser, dry-sheds, kilns and a 5 MW (6,700 hp) wood waste heat plant, added in 2001. In April 2008, Ernslaw One Ltd purchased WPI. Ernslaw One owned by the Malaysian Tiong Family, bought WPI for $117,293,314. WPI employed about 300 staff. At 30 September 2006, its forest crop was valued at $83m and its fixed assets at $38.7m. It earned $131m, but lost $10.1m. Ernslaw One also has forests and mills in Gisborne, Naseby and Tapanui.

=== Pulp mill ===
A further use for the timber was the pulp mill, though it had a troubled beginning. In 1976 Winstone and Chonju Paper Manufacturing, a Samsung subsidiary, built a thermo-mechanical pulp mill, almost 3 km (1.9 mi) north of the sawmill. In 1978 the first load of logs was delivered to the mill. At least 70% of the pulp was to go to Chonju, but, when the mill came on stream in 1979, prices for pulp and newspaper had fallen and the pulp was of variable quality. In 1981 the mill was caught up in the Think Big debate, when the government took $10m in preference shares and made a $5m loan. Losses that year were $7.133m and rose to $11m. Later in 1981 H.W. Smith Ltd, a company linked with Brierley Investments, increased its 10% holding in Winstone to 24.9% and to 27% in 1983. Brierley gained full control of Winstone when the government sold its interests. The last remaining director from the Winstone family, Donald, retired. In early 1988, Fletcher Challenge bought Winstone for $444m. Karioi was sold within months to a Hong Kong investment company. The name of Winstone Pulp International was adopted. WPI was sold to Ernslaw One group in 2008.

The mill produced 100,000 m^{3} (3,500,000 cu ft) a year when running a single-shift. It was mainly used for newsprint and paperboard, much of it exported through New Plymouth, then CentrePort Wellington and then Napier. A 12 MW (16,000 hp) bark furnace and a heat exchanger recovered 3 MW (4,000 hp) of heat from steam for drying the pulp, electricity and LPG supplying the other energy. Excess heat was used to dry timber from the sawmill. In 2004 the mill had 145 staff.

=== 2024 mills closure ===
In August 2024, Winstone Pulp International proposed closing its two central North Island mills due to high power prices. At a public meeting in Raetihi on 27 August, Mayor of Ruapehu Weston Kirton urged the New Zealand Government to offer an electrical subsidy to Winstones' mills. National Party Member of Parliament Suze Redmayne responded that the Government was working with electrical utility companies to find solutions. On 10 September 2024, the company confirmed that it would close down its Karioi pulp mill and Tangiwai timber mill by October 2024, leading to the loss of 230 jobs. WPI chief executive Mike Ryan attributed the closure to the "dual impacts of internationally uncompetitive energy prices in New Zealand and the relatively low current and forecast market prices for pulp and timber". Ryan confirmed that WPI would support staff by helping them to find jobs with other industry companies, work with the Ministry of Social Development and Inland Revenue Department to support retrenched staff and provide access to wellbeing providers and financial advisers.

WPI had previously criticised high power prices for making its business operations unsustainable, which was disputed by electrical utility company Mercury Energy. On 5 August, the company had also temporarily paused operations at both Karioi and Tangiwai, citing high energy prices. In response to WPI's closure proposal, workers had unsuccessfully petitioned to save the mills and made 189 submissions to improve the mills and cut down on costs. RNZ reported that many employees had said that the mill's closure would lead to job losses in the Ruapehu District and cause families to migrate to Australia for work in the timber industry.

First Union and E tū issued a joint statement describing the mills' closure as "devastating." First Union general secretary Dennis Maga thanked the local mayors and Associate Energy Minister Shane Jones for fighting to keep the mills open but criticised the Government for not intervening to address the impact of its previous energy reforms. Ruapehu Mayor Kirton described the mills' closures as a "massive blow to Ruapehu and our communities." He confirmed that the Ruapehu District Council would work with WINZ and its iwi partners to support affected workers. Energy Minister Simeon Brown defended the New Zealand Government's decision not to intervene, describing it as a "commercial decision." In response, Labour Party's small business and manufacturing spokesperson Helen White criticised the Government for not doing more to keep the mills open.

Closure of the Winestone pulp and timber mills adversely affected the nearby township of Raetihi, leading to emigration and economic decline.

== Climate ==
Climate data for Tangiwai (Karioi Forest) (5km WSW of Tangiwai, 1971–2000 normals, extremes 1930–1987)
Month	Jan	Feb	Mar	Apr	May	Jun	Jul	Aug	Sep	Oct	Nov	Dec	Year
Record high °C (°F)	29.4 (84.9)	31.2 (88.2)	29.2 (84.6)	26.7 (80.1)	21.8 (71.2)	19.3 (66.7)	16.7 (62.1)	18.9 (66.0)	23.9 (75.0)	24.8 (76.6)	27.2 (81.0)	29.7 (85.5)	31.2 (88.2)
Mean maximum °C (°F)	26.4 (79.5)	26.7 (80.1)	24.3 (75.7)	21.4 (70.5)	17.8 (64.0)	15.6 (60.1)	14.3 (57.7)	15.5 (59.9)	17.3 (63.1)	20.2 (68.4)	22.7 (72.9)	24.3 (75.7)	27.5 (81.5)
Mean daily maximum °C (°F)	21.2 (70.2)	21.4 (70.5)	19.5 (67.1)	16.1 (61.0)	12.4 (54.3)	10.1 (50.2)	9.3 (48.7)	10.5 (50.9)	12.1 (53.8)	14.8 (58.6)	17.0 (62.6)	19.2 (66.6)	15.3 (59.5)
Daily mean °C (°F)	15.3 (59.5)	15.3 (59.5)	13.6 (56.5)	10.8 (51.4)	7.9 (46.2)	6.0 (42.8)	5.2 (41.4)	6.0 (42.8)	7.6 (45.7)	9.8 (49.6)	11.6 (52.9)	13.6 (56.5)	10.2 (50.4)
Mean daily minimum °C (°F)	9.4 (48.9)	9.2 (48.6)	7.7 (45.9)	5.6 (42.1)	3.5 (38.3)	1.9 (35.4)	1.2 (34.2)	1.5 (34.7)	3.2 (37.8)	4.9 (40.8)	6.2 (43.2)	8.0 (46.4)	5.2 (41.4)
Mean minimum °C (°F)	3.0 (37.4)	2.2 (36.0)	1.6 (34.9)	−0.3 (31.5)	−2.9 (26.8)	−4.5 (23.9)	−4.4 (24.1)	−3.6 (25.5)	−2.5 (27.5)	−1.5 (29.3)	0.0 (32.0)	1.7 (35.1)	−5.8 (21.6)
Record low °C (°F)	−1.1 (30.0)	−2.8 (27.0)	−3.6 (25.5)	−5.6 (21.9)	−8.1 (17.4)	−8.3 (17.1)	−9.6 (14.7)	−9.7 (14.5)	−7.3 (18.9)	−7.7 (18.1)	−4.4 (24.1)	−4.4 (24.1)	−9.7 (14.5)
Average rainfall mm (inches)	94.6 (3.72)	56.8 (2.24)	76.5 (3.01)	74.6 (2.94)	133.3 (5.25)	102.6 (4.04)	134.4 (5.29)	100.3 (3.95)	110.3 (4.34)	96.1 (3.78)	76.6 (3.02)	120.0 (4.72)	1,176.1 (46.3)
Source: NIWA
