= Rangataua railway station =

Railway station in New Zealand

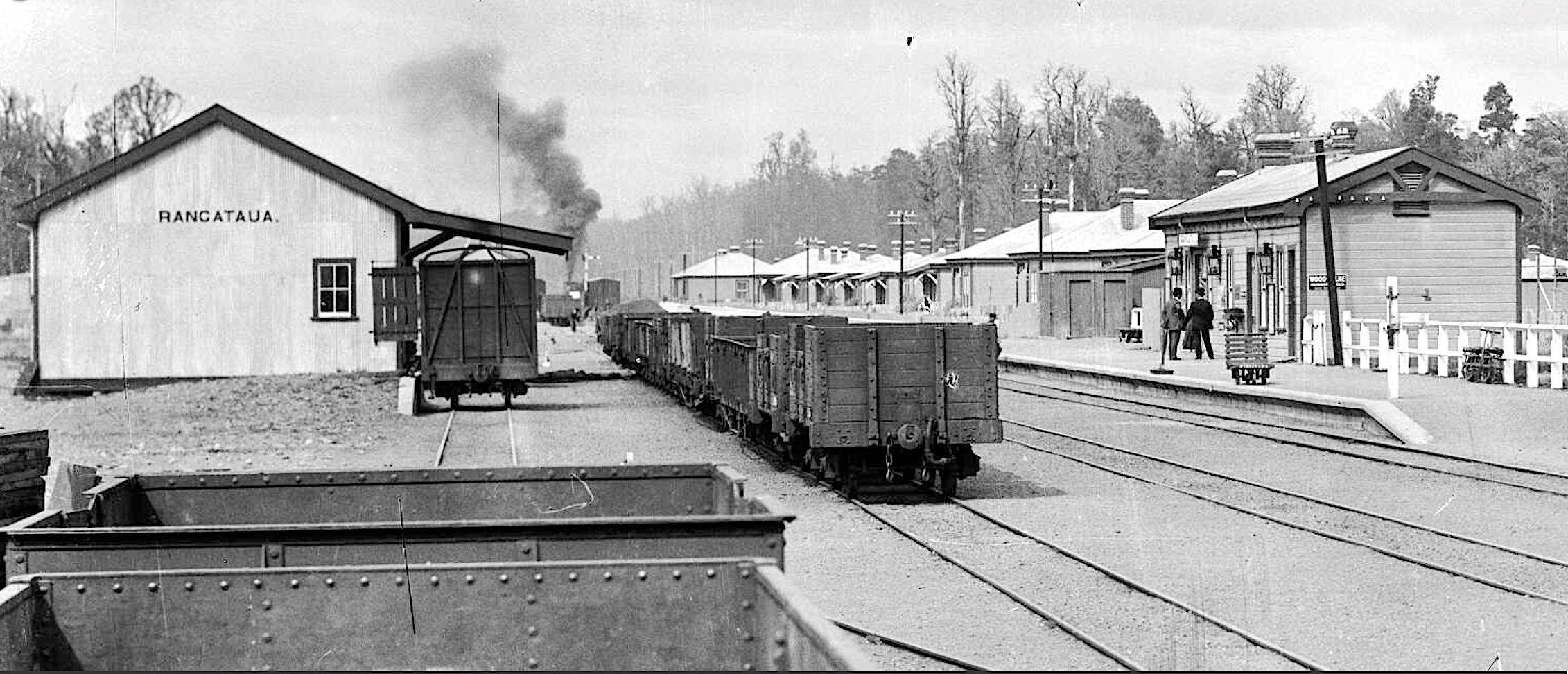
- Railway station Rangataua 1910s

General information
- Location: New Zealand
- Coordinates: 39.42638°S 175.45713°E
- Elevation: 670 m (2,200 ft)
- Line: North Island Main Trunk
- Distance: Wellington 312.66 km (194.28 mi)

History
- Opened: in use from 31 May 1907 goods 12 August 1907 passengers 15 February 1909
- Closed: goods 19/9/1986 passengers before December 1975
- Electrified: June 1988

Services
| Preceding station | Historical railways | Following station |
|---|---|---|
| Ohakune; Line open, station open 4.43 km (2.75 mi) | North Island Main Trunk; KiwiRail | Karioi; Line open, station closed 5.52 km (3.43 mi) |
Location

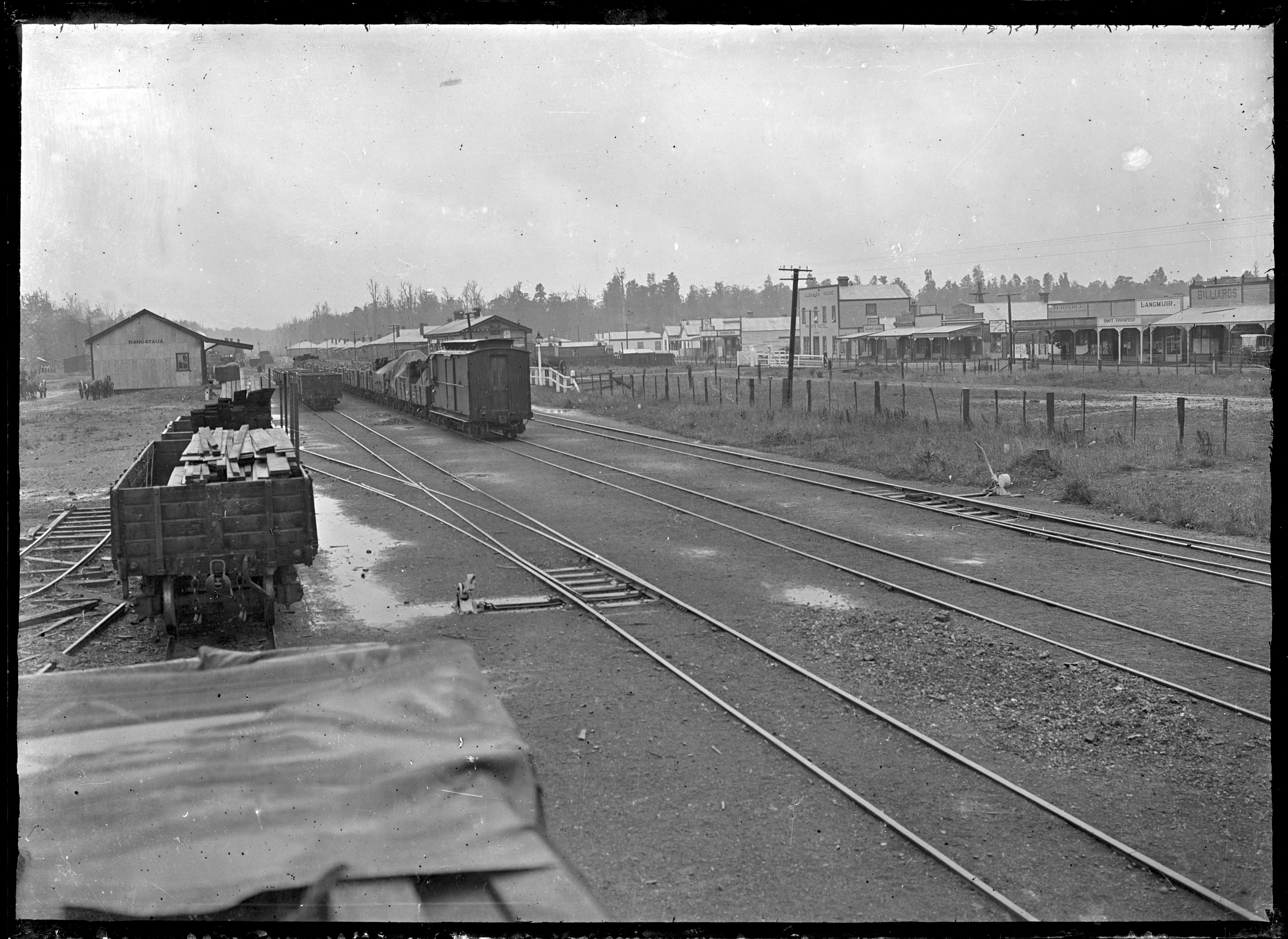
Rangataua station and township about 1914

Rangataua was a station on the North Island Main Trunk line, in the Ruapehu District of New Zealand. Like most of the stations on the central part of the NIMT, a large timber trade exploited the native bush until it was largely felled. What is now the small village of Rangataua developed to the south of the station. Just a single track now passes through and virtually nothing remains of the once busy station and workshops.

== History ==
Surveying for the route between Hīhītahi and Piriaka began in 1894. Bush felling for the railway started in 1900. The rails were extended to the station on 31 May 1907 and a passenger train with dignitaries and reporters reached it in July. The line opened from Waiouru to Rangataua for goods traffic on 12 August 1907. A stationmaster was appointed in August 1907. There was mention of cars for passenger trains from Mataroa to Rangataua in September 1907.

During construction a small workshop was built at Rangataua in 1907 and 1908, with a plumber, carpenter, painter, store, and smithy. Further machinery was added in 1912 and a shed in 1928.

A 3rd class station was built by September 1909 for around £11,000, including workshops and housing for an inspector, a stationmaster and two platelayers. 5 railway cottages were built by 1908 and some were moved from Waiouru to Rangataua in 1909. The stationmaster got hot water in 1912, the others in 1915, and it was proposed to light the cottages with electricity in 1914. When opened, Rangataua had rooms for a stationmaster, booking office, lobby, luggage, urinals and ladies, on a 300 ft (91 m) by 15 ft (4.6 m) platform. There was also a 40 ft (12 m) by 30 ft (9.1 m) goods shed with verandah, a loading bank, cattle and sheep yards and a cart approach. There was a tablet and fixed signals. A water tank was added in 1910. A crossing loop could take 60 wagons.

As timber traffic declined (see table below), so did the station. In 1934 Rangataua was converted to a tablet station which could be switched out. On 28 February 1959 it lost its stationmaster. Approval to remove the station building was given in 1971. On 19 September 1986 the station closed to all traffic.

== Timber ==
As shown in the table below, timber traffic reached a peak in 1913 and declined rapidly after 1930. There were several timber mills. R A Wilson proposed a siding in the station yard in 1907, Perham & Larson applied for a siding 20 ch (1,300 ft; 400 m) south of the station in 1908, Rangataua Timber Co (formed in 1907) applied to extend theirs in 1908. Perham & Larson had about 10 acres (4.0 ha) in 1909 In 1910 they sent timber to Lower Hutt. Perham, Larsen & Co's private siding was 1 1/2 mi (2.4 km) from the station. Perham, Larson & Co had a tramway, with a Climax loco, from about 1909 (they had a tramway license in 1913) to 1944. Waiakaki Sawmilling Co had a tramway from around 1928 to 1933. In 1940 Marton Sash & Door Co were cutting the bush.

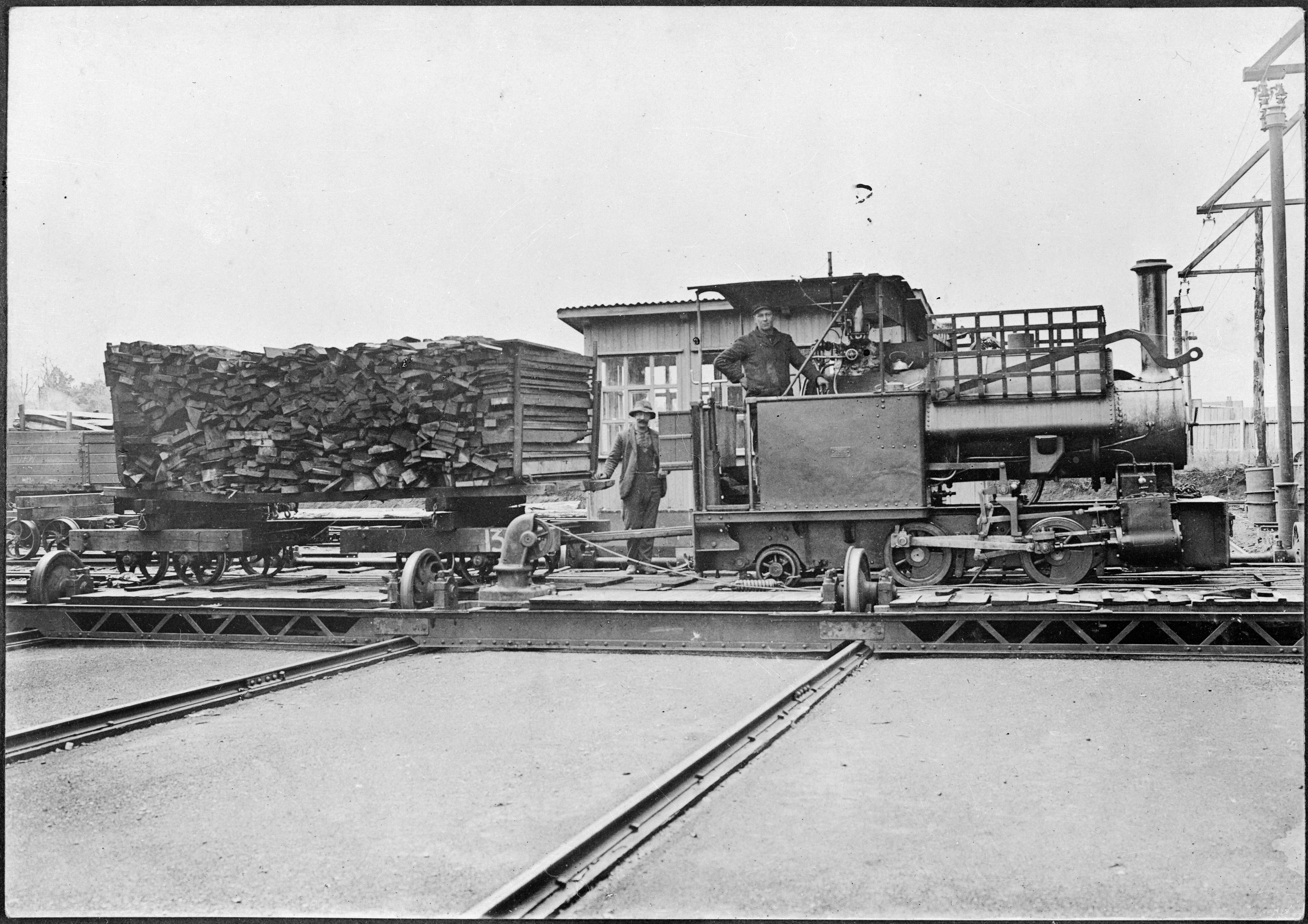
Powell's tramway; probably a W.G. Bagnall Ltd 1911 0-4-2 ST, transferred to Westfield Freezing works in 1916

=== Powell Wood Process Ltd ===
In 1908 a new sawmill and treatment works were built to produce Powellised timber, which was claimed to resist rot and insect damage. They had rights to fell 4,402 acres (1,781 ha) of rimu, mataī, kahikatea, māpou, kāmahi and hard beech forest, The works were connected to that and the railway by a tramway, which extended some 6 mi (9.7 km) towards Mount Ruapehu, the total cost being about £30,000; a 1910 photo showed a group on horses following a tramline on the way to the mountain. A 1913 plan was for 7 mi (11 km) of tramway. The works was expanded in 1909 and 1911, but a 1915 report cast doubt on the claims for the process and, after the works burnt down in the Raetihi forest fire of 1918, the company went into liquidation. A 1930 report on wooden paving in Auckland noted how well the Powellised timber had lasted.

== Patronage ==
As shown in the table and graph below, like many NIMT stations, passenger numbers were highest during World War II, but then fell back to an average of around 25 a day. However, Rangataua ranked 3rd among NIMT stations in terms of the volume of its timber traffic by 1913. By 1910 it was sending out an average of 25 wagons a day. World War I labour shortages, the 1918 fire and conversion of land to grazing, then reduced timber traffic, but sheep numbers rose from 1,222 in 1913 to 12,662 in 1949.

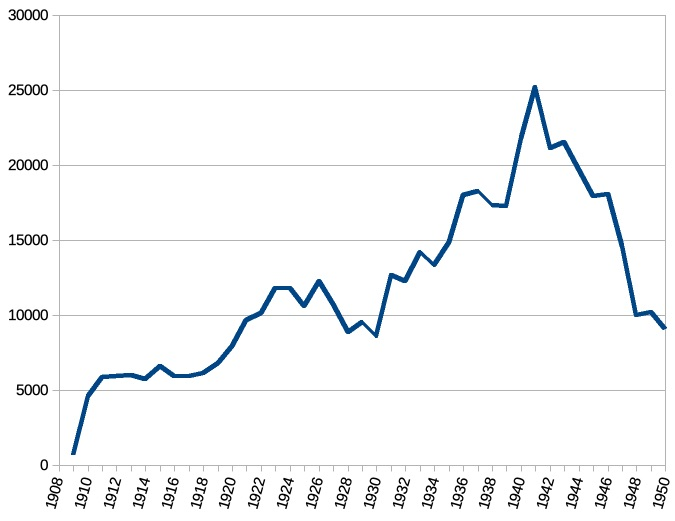
Rangataua ticket sales 1908–1950 – derived from annual returns to Parliament of "Statement of Revenue for each Station for the Year ended"

| year | tickets | season tickets | timber superficial feet | staff |
| 1908 | | | 1,040,000 | 2 |
| 1909 | 648 | 2 | 4,664,300 | 6 |
| 1910 | 4,603 | 9 | 4,984,600 | 4 |
| 1911 | 5,865 | 2 | 9,279,400 | 4 |
| 1912 | 5,876 | 3 | 11,285,100 | 5 |
| 1913 | 5,955 | 6 | 13,449,800 | 7 |
| 1914 | 5,721 | 22 | 10,762,800 | |
| 1915 | 6,551 | 10 | 8,957,300 | |
| 1916 | 5,930 | 26 | 8,925,200 | |
| 1917 | 5,908 | 77 | 6,447,000 | |
| 1918 | 6,101 | 77 | 5,706,600 | |
| 1919 | 6,779 | 63 | 5,431,700 | |
| 1920 | 7,886 | 117 | 7,010,100 | |
| 1921 | 9,678 | 106 | 6,951,800 | |
| 1922 | 10,138 | 80 | 5,525,200 | |
| 1923 | 11,807 | 69 | 4,385,500 | |
| 1924 | 11,778 | 137 | 5,187,300 | |
| 1925 | 10,607 | 72 | 5,204,000 | |
| 1926 | 12,219 | 133 | 6,265,800 | |
| 1927 | 10,737 | 73 | 5,758,400 | |
| 1928 | 8,867 | 72 | 4,716,800 | |
| 1929 | 9,511 | 26 | 5,466,200 | |
| 1930 | 8,607 | 32 | 5,723,500 | |
| 1931 | 12,668 | 38 | 4,044,400 | |
| 1932 | 12,228 | 71 | 2,723,500 | |
| 1933 | 14,152 | 118 | 1,839,200 | |
| 1934 | 13,301 | 76 | 1,386,600 | |
| 1935 | 14,813 | 72 | 1,366,900 | |
| 1936 | 17,980 | 94 | 2,008,200 | |
| 1937 | 18,222 | 110 | 1,335,400 | |
| 1938 | 17,308 | 82 | 980,500 | |
| 1939 | 17,278 | 73 | 1,771,600 | |
| 1940 | 21,799 | 53 | 1,574,300 | |
| 1941 | 25,186 | 43 | 1,916,800 | |
| 1942 | 21,100 | 24 | 1,862,100 | |
| 1943 | 21,528 | 17 | 2,548,400 | |
| 1944 | 19,630 | 12 | 1,680,500 | |
| 1945 | 17,938 | | 1,773,700 | |
| 1946 | 18,049 | | 1,748,100 | |
| 1947 | 14,585 | 1 | 1,837,700 | |
| 1948 | 9,986 | 2 | 1,256,500 | |
| 1949 | 10,181 | | 1,434,800 | |
| 1950 | 9,030 | | 950,100 | |
