= Rangataua =

Settlement in Manawatū-Whanganui Region, New Zealand

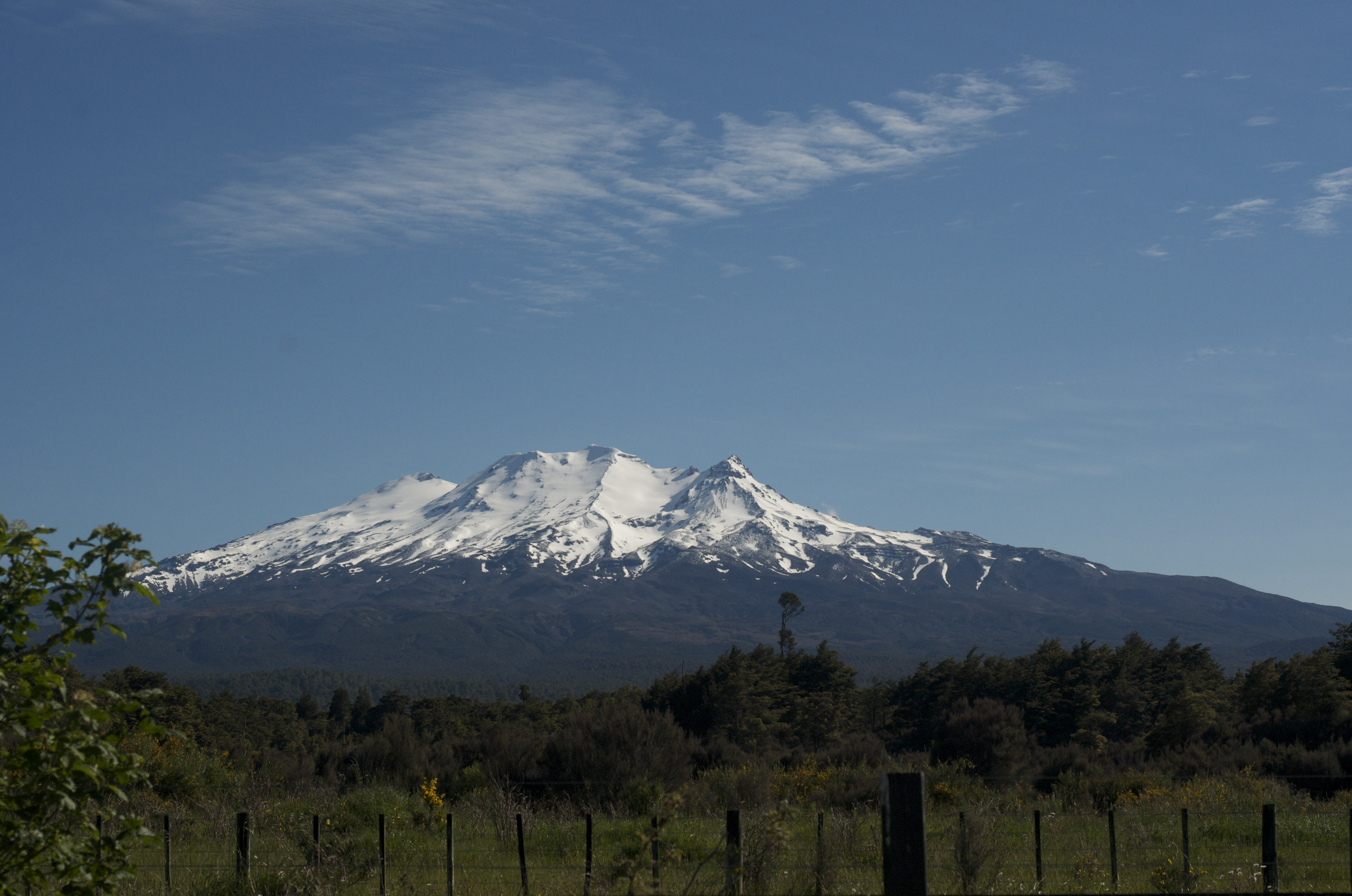
- Mount Ruapehu seen from Rangataua
- Interactive map of Rangataua
- Coordinates: 39.429°S 175.455°E
- Country: New Zealand
- Region: Manawatū-Whanganui
- District: Ruapehu District
- Ward: Ruapehu General Ward; Ruapehu Māori Ward
- Community: Waimarino-Waiouru Community
- Electorates: Whanganui; Te Tai Hauāuru (Māori)

Government
  - Territorial Authority: Ruapehu District Council
  - Regional council: Horizons Regional Council
  - Mayor of Ruapehu: Weston Kirton
  - Whanganui MP: Carl Bates
  - Te Tai Hauāuru MP: Debbie Ngarewa-Packer

Area
  - Total: 0.77 km^{2} (0.30 sq mi)

Population (June 2025)
  - Total: 190
  - Density: 250/km^{2} (640/sq mi)
- Time zone: UTC+12 (NZST)
  - Summer (DST): UTC+13 (NZDT)
- Postcode: 4691
- Area code: 06

Rangataua is a small village in the North Island of New Zealand. It is located at the southern end of both the Tongariro National Park and Rangataua State Forest, adjacent to the southwestern slopes of the active volcano Mount Ruapehu. Part of the Manawatū-Whanganui region, the town is 5 kilometres east of Ohakune, 75 kilometres northeast of Whanganui, and 20 kilometres west of Waiouru.

The village's permanent population work in the nearby region with much of the seasonal population working at the Turoa Skifield. When the timber industry was at its peak, Rangataua had a population of 957 in 1914.

Rangataua contains many properties that are owned as holiday villas or baches usually used for skiing at the nearby Turoa Skifield.

== Transportation ==
State Highway 49 runs immediately adjacent to the village, as does the North Island Main Trunk railway. There is no station and all passenger rail traffic uses the railway station at Ohakune.

== History ==
The name Rangataua comes from two Māori words: Ranga - to parade in ranks; to fall in, and taua - war party. Rangataua was the site of a Māori village. In the mid seventeenth century this village was attacked and subsequently destroyed. The survivors of the attack established a pā on the site of present-day Ohakune.

The town grew rapidly after the railway opened. A 1909 report said a billiard room, hair-dressing saloon, stationery shop and bakery were open, or being built. Marino and Piwari Streets were nearing completion and Miharo was expected to be a business street. A skating rink opened in 1911.

The Raetihi forest fire of March 18–20, 1918 almost destroyed Rangataua. Many houses and sawmills were burnt down. Fires had previously threatened the town in January 1914.

== Demographics ==
Rangataua is described by Statistics New Zealand as a rural settlement. It covers 0.77 km^{2} (0.30 sq mi) and had an estimated population of 190 as of June 2025, with a population density of 247 people per km^{2}. It is part of the larger Tangiwai statistical area, which covers 2,696.63 km^{2} (1,041.17 sq mi).

Historical population
Year	Pop.	±% p.a.
2006	120	—
2013	132	+1.37%
2018	132	+0.00%
2023	183	+6.75%

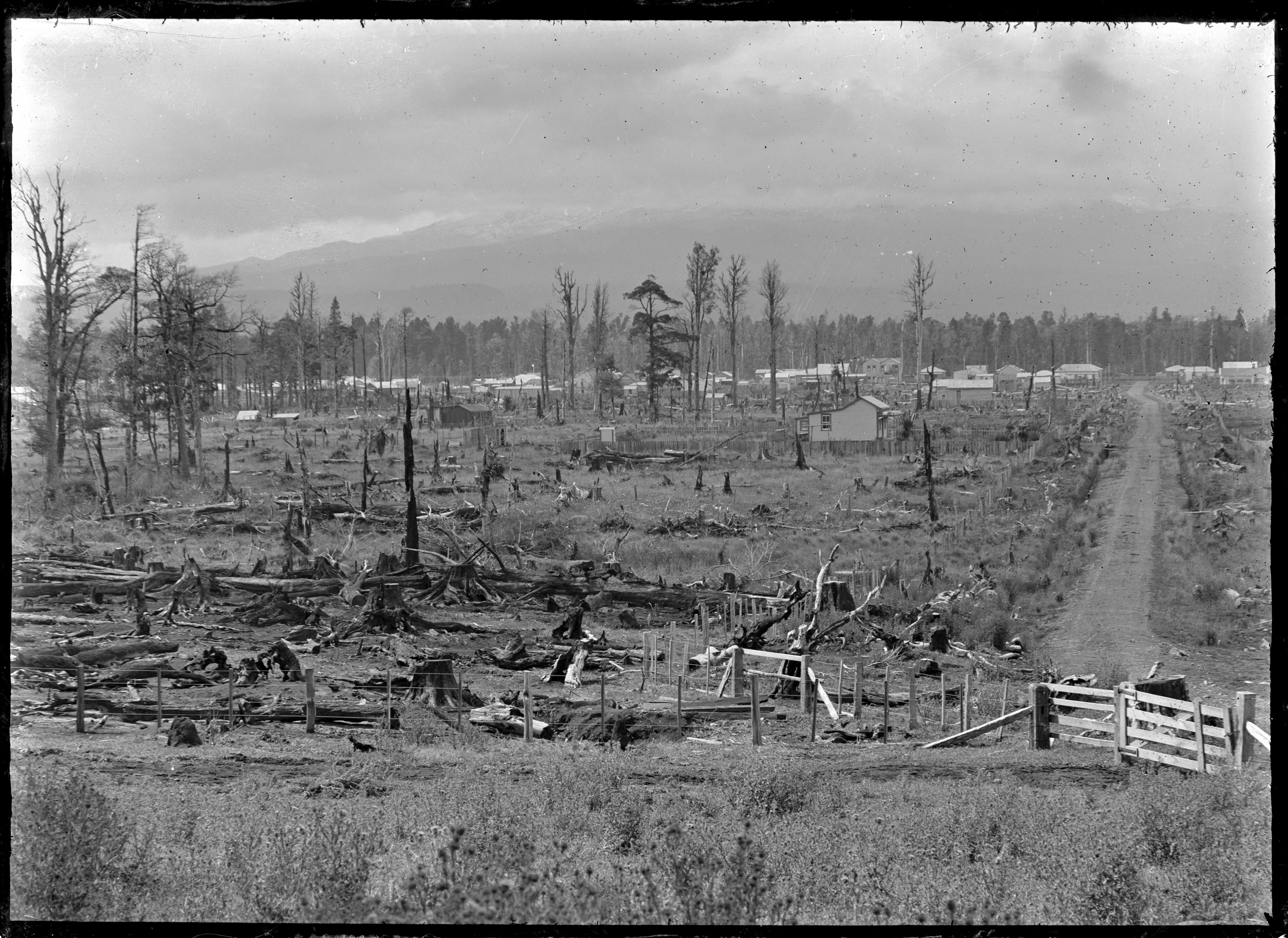
Paddocks with tree stumps, on the outskirts of Rangataua between 1912 and 1916

Rangataua had a population of 183 in the 2023 New Zealand census, an increase of 51 people (38.6%) since the 2018 census, and an increase of 51 people (38.6%) since the 2013 census. There were 90 males and 90 females in 93 dwellings. 4.9% of people identified as LGBTIQ+. The median age was 38.5 years (compared with 38.1 years nationally). There were 33 people (18.0%) aged under 15 years, 24 (13.1%) aged 15 to 29, 102 (55.7%) aged 30 to 64, and 27 (14.8%) aged 65 or older.

People could identify as more than one ethnicity. The results were 90.2% European (Pākehā), 21.3% Māori, 1.6% Pasifika, 1.6% Asian, and 3.3% other, which includes people giving their ethnicity as "New Zealander". English was spoken by 98.4%, Māori by 6.6%, and other languages by 11.5%. No language could be spoken by 3.3% (e.g. too young to talk). The percentage of people born overseas was 16.4, compared with 28.8% nationally.

Religious affiliations were 18.0% Christian, 1.6% Māori religious beliefs, 1.6% Buddhist, 1.6% New Age, and 1.6% other religions. People who answered that they had no religion were 60.7%, and 14.8% of people did not answer the census question.

Of those at least 15 years old, 30 (20.0%) people had a bachelor's or higher degree, 93 (62.0%) had a post-high school certificate or diploma, and 27 (18.0%) people exclusively held high school qualifications. The median income was $36,900, compared with $41,500 nationally. 9 people (6.0%) earned over $100,000 compared to 12.1% nationally. The employment status of those at least 15 was 66 (44.0%) full-time, 21 (14.0%) part-time, and 6 (4.0%) unemployed.

== Conservation areas ==
To the immediate east of the village is the 6710 hectare Rangataua Conservation Area, which is contiguous with the UNESCO World Heritage Site Tongariro National Park on its northern boundary. Rangataua is bounded to the north by the 58 hectare Rangataua Scenic Reserve, and to the immediate southeast by the 77 hectare Mangaehuehu Scenic Reserve.

== Climate ==
Climate data for Rangataua (Karioi Forest) (7km SE of Rangataua, 1971–2000 normals, extremes 1930–1987)
Month	Jan	Feb	Mar	Apr	May	Jun	Jul	Aug	Sep	Oct	Nov	Dec	Year
Record high °C (°F)	29.4 (84.9)	31.2 (88.2)	29.2 (84.6)	26.7 (80.1)	21.8 (71.2)	19.3 (66.7)	16.7 (62.1)	18.9 (66.0)	23.9 (75.0)	24.8 (76.6)	27.2 (81.0)	29.7 (85.5)	31.2 (88.2)
Mean maximum °C (°F)	26.4 (79.5)	26.7 (80.1)	24.3 (75.7)	21.4 (70.5)	17.8 (64.0)	15.6 (60.1)	14.3 (57.7)	15.5 (59.9)	17.3 (63.1)	20.2 (68.4)	22.7 (72.9)	24.3 (75.7)	27.5 (81.5)
Mean daily maximum °C (°F)	21.2 (70.2)	21.4 (70.5)	19.5 (67.1)	16.1 (61.0)	12.4 (54.3)	10.1 (50.2)	9.3 (48.7)	10.5 (50.9)	12.1 (53.8)	14.8 (58.6)	17.0 (62.6)	19.2 (66.6)	15.3 (59.5)
Daily mean °C (°F)	15.3 (59.5)	15.3 (59.5)	13.6 (56.5)	10.8 (51.4)	7.9 (46.2)	6.0 (42.8)	5.2 (41.4)	6.0 (42.8)	7.6 (45.7)	9.8 (49.6)	11.6 (52.9)	13.6 (56.5)	10.2 (50.4)
Mean daily minimum °C (°F)	9.4 (48.9)	9.2 (48.6)	7.7 (45.9)	5.6 (42.1)	3.5 (38.3)	1.9 (35.4)	1.2 (34.2)	1.5 (34.7)	3.2 (37.8)	4.9 (40.8)	6.2 (43.2)	8.0 (46.4)	5.2 (41.4)
Mean minimum °C (°F)	3.0 (37.4)	2.2 (36.0)	1.6 (34.9)	−0.3 (31.5)	−2.9 (26.8)	−4.5 (23.9)	−4.4 (24.1)	−3.6 (25.5)	−2.5 (27.5)	−1.5 (29.3)	0.0 (32.0)	1.7 (35.1)	−5.8 (21.6)
Record low °C (°F)	−1.1 (30.0)	−2.8 (27.0)	−3.6 (25.5)	−5.6 (21.9)	−8.1 (17.4)	−8.3 (17.1)	−9.6 (14.7)	−9.7 (14.5)	−7.3 (18.9)	−7.7 (18.1)	−4.4 (24.1)	−4.4 (24.1)	−9.7 (14.5)
Average rainfall mm (inches)	94.6 (3.72)	56.8 (2.24)	76.5 (3.01)	74.6 (2.94)	133.3 (5.25)	102.6 (4.04)	134.4 (5.29)	100.3 (3.95)	110.3 (4.34)	96.1 (3.78)	76.6 (3.02)	120.0 (4.72)	1,176.1 (46.3)
Source: NIWA

== See also ==
- Ruapehu District
