= State Highway 49 (New Zealand) =

Road in New Zealand

State Highway 49

Route information
- Maintained by NZ Transport Agency Waka Kotahi
- Length: 36.2 km (22.5 mi)

Major junctions
- West end: SH 4 at Tohunga Junction
- East end: SH 1 at Waiouru

Location
- Country: New Zealand
- Primary destinations: Ohakune

Highway system
- New Zealand state highways; Motorways and expressways; List
← SH 48	→ SH 50

State Highway 49 (SH 49) is a New Zealand state highway, linking SH 4 and SH 1, via the tourist town of Ohakune. It forms the southern part of the ring road surrounding Tongariro National Park and provides access to the southern side of Mount Ruapehu and the Turoa skifield. It roughly follows the North Island Main Trunk railway.

SH 49, along with SH 4, SH 47, and SH 46, is used as an alternative route to SH 1 and the Desert Road, and is well used when the Desert Road is closed due to snow.

SH 49 lies entirely within the Ruapehu District.

== Route ==
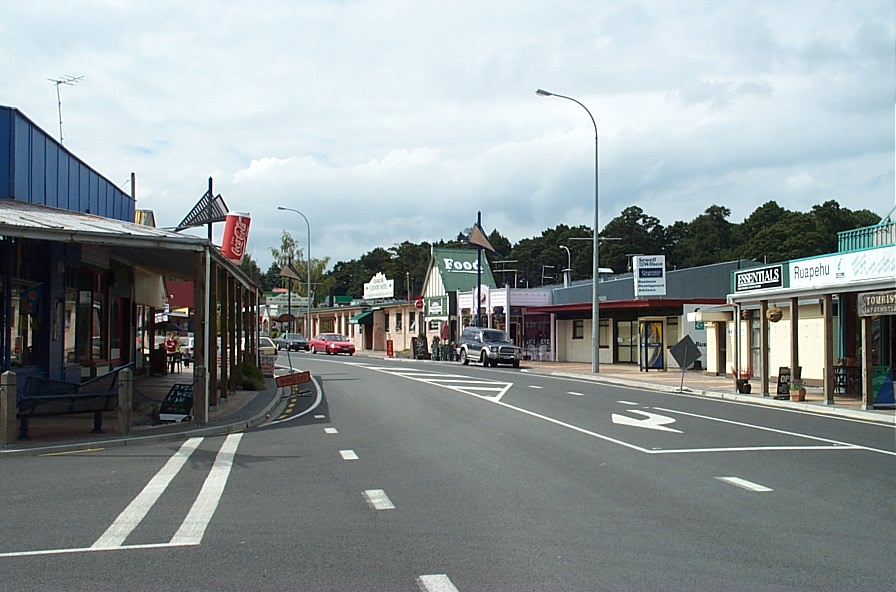
State Highway 49 passing through Ohakune.

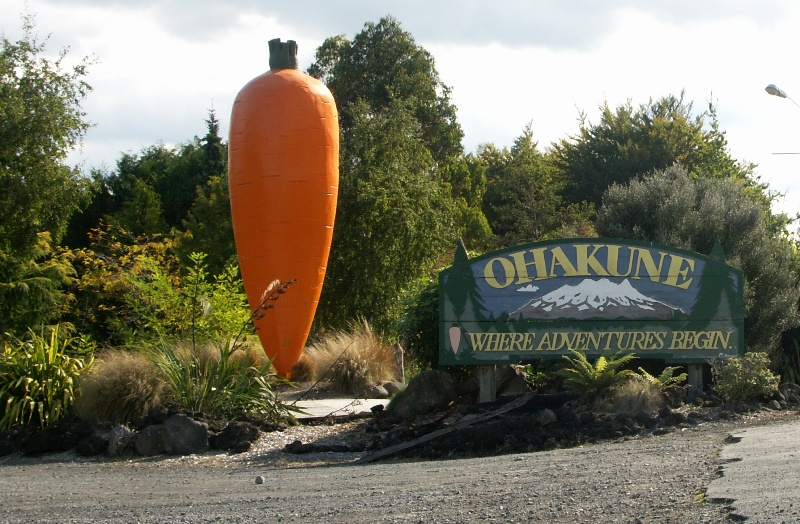
Ohakune's famous giant carrot lies just off State Highway 49 at the eastern end of the township.

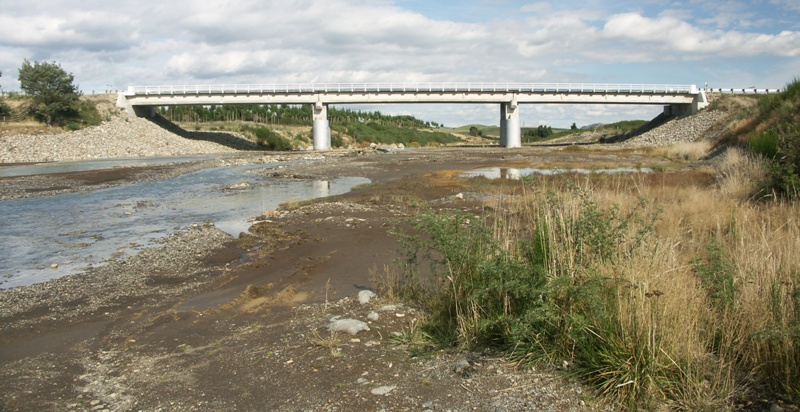
State Highway 49's bridge over the Whangaehu River at Tangiwai.

SH 49 leaves SH 4 at Tohunga Junction, some eight kilometres north of Raetihi, and heads southeast across rolling hills to the tourist town of Ohakune. Following Ohakune's main street, the road continues southeast out of the township, passing Ohakune's famous giant carrot.

SH 49 continues southeast across rolling hills, running broadly in the same direction as the North Island Main Trunk. It passes the rural villages of Rangataua and Karioi, before meeting the railway line at the Whangaehu River at Tangiwai. The bridge here has flashing lights and gates to block off the road in case of a lahar from Mount Ruapehu's crater lake. To the side of the bridge is the Tangiwai memorial, erected to remember the 151 people who died in the Tangiwai disaster when a Wellington to Auckland express train plunged into the river following a lahar on 24 December 1953.

After crossing the Whangaehu River, and the railway line, SH 49 turns east for several kilometres, before turning south into Waiouru. At Waiouru, SH 49 ends at the intersection with SH 1.

== Former Spur ==
SH 49 used to have one spur; SH 49A. It deviated from SH 49 at Ohakune, and ran west to Raetihi, where it terminated at SH 4. SH 49A was revoked in 1991–92.

Some older New Zealand maps instead have SH 49 running on the section between Ohakune and Raetihi, and SH 49A on the section between Ohakune and Tohunga Junction.

== Major intersections ==
The highway lies entirely within the Ruapehu District.

Location	km	jct	Destinations	Notes
Tohunga Junction	0		SH 4 north – National Park; SH 4 south – Wanganui	SH 49 begins
Ohakune			Goldfinch Street – Turoa skifield	
Ohakune			Raehiti Ohakune Road – Raetihi	Former SH 49A
Tangiwai	29		Whangaehu River	
Waiouru	38		SH 1 north (Desert Road) – Taupō; SH 1 south – Palmerston North	SH 49 ends

== See also ==
- List of New Zealand state highways
