= Karioi railway station =

Railway station in New Zealand

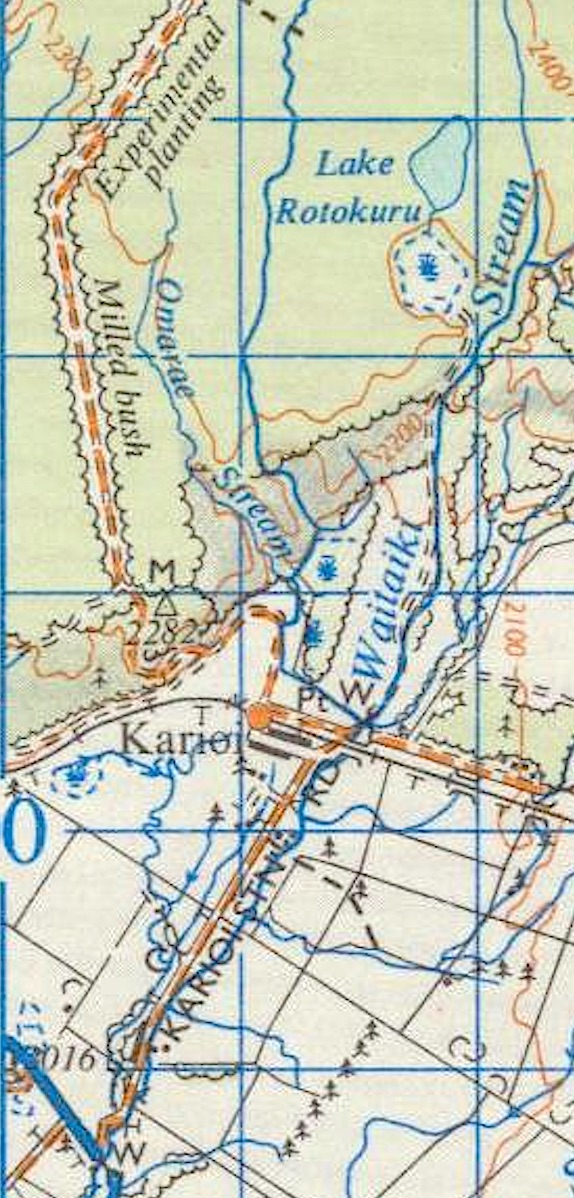
- Karioi railway station on 1966 map

General information
- Location: New Zealand
- Coordinates: 39.447576°S 175.512587°E
- Elevation: 630 m (2,070 ft)
- Line: North Island Main Trunk
- Distance: Wellington 307.14 km (190.85 mi)

History
- Opened: 12 August 1907
- Closed: 23 June 1984
- Electrified: June 1988
- Former names: Ninia

Services
Preceding station	Historical railways	Following station
Rangataua; Line open, station closed 5.52 km (3.43 mi)	North Island Main Trunk; KiwiRail	Tangiwai; Line open, station closed 7.65 km (4.75 mi)
Location

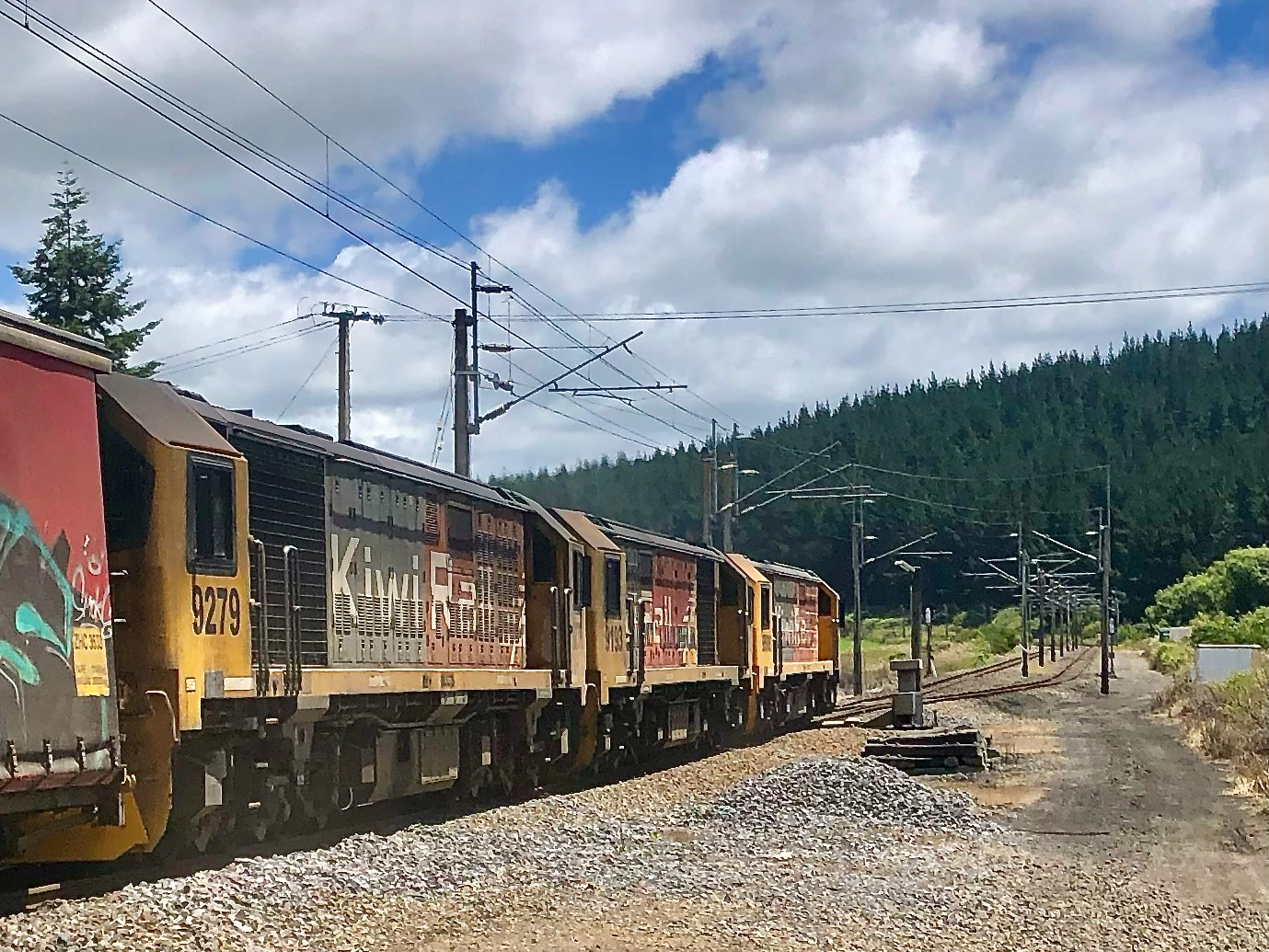
Container train entering Karioi crossing loop from the south

Karioi was a station on the North Island Main Trunk line, in the Ruapehu District of New Zealand. A passing loop remains.

== Name ==
The name was changed to Ninnia, or Ninia in 1907, but reverted to Karioi in 1910, though Ninia was still on the 1926 map. Ninia was also later used, further north on the NIMT, at Waione Siding. Karioi settlement lay 2 mi (3.2 km) to the south at what is now Karioi Domain.

== History ==
Surveying for the route between Hīhītahi and Piriaka began in 1894. Bush felling for the railway started in 1900. The rails were extended to the station in March, or April 1907 and the line opened from Waiouru to Rangataua for goods traffic on 12 August 1907.

A road to the station was built in 1907 for £1,078.10s. A 3rd class station was built by March 1908 with a budget of £7,672, though that may have included Ohakune. When opened Karioi had rooms for a stationmaster, luggage, urinals and ladies, on a 240 ft (73 m) by 15 ft (4.6 m) platform. There was also a 40 ft (12 m) by 30 ft (9.1 m) goods shed with verandah, a loading bank, cattle and sheep yards, two 4,000 imp gal (18,000 L) water tanks and a cart approach. There was a tablet and fixed signals. Cottages for railway staff were built from 1904 to 1919. A crossing loop could take 85 wagons. There was a Post Office at the station from 1913 to 1951. Approval to remove the station building was given in 1971. On 31 January 1982 the station closed to all traffic except in wagon lots and closed to that on 23 June 1984.

== Mangawhero Sawmilling tramway ==
An agreement to log 3,700 acres (1,500 ha) was made in 1906. Mangawhero Sawmilling Co's logging tramway ran east from the station between about 1922 and 1929. About 1926 the mill bought 3 Nattrass Tractors and were quoted as saying, "After spending £7000 on a tramway, and purchasing a locomotive (unable to shift any timber because of the grade being one in nine), one million and a half feet of timber accumulated, and your Rail Tractor saved the situation." The line was worked by an NZR P class (1876) loco, transferred from the Sanson Tramway in about 1922, but it was dismantled by 1932.

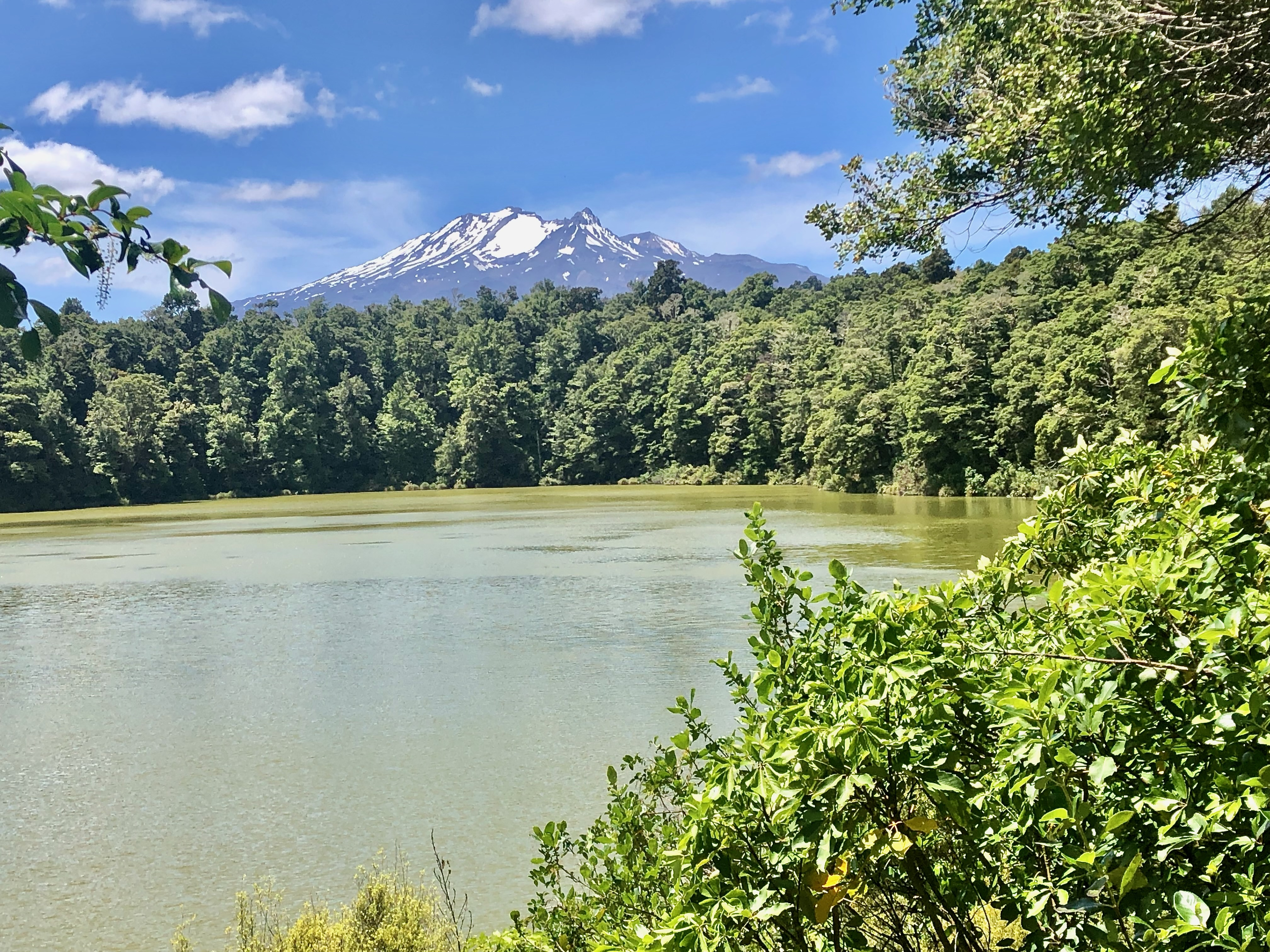
Lake Rotokura and Ruapehu.

== Lake Rotokura ==
To the north of the station, Lake Rotokura and Dry Lake are maar crater lakes. A half hour walk from the station leads to the lake. It remains surrounded by beech forest, in which tūī, kākā, korimako, pīwakawaka and toutouwai are commonly seen. Mistletoe is being monitored in the area.
