= Frank Aickin =

Francis William (Frank) Aickin (7 July 1894 – 23 July 1982) was the General Manager of New Zealand Railways (NZR) from 1948 to 1951.

== Early life and family ==
He was born in Onehunga in 1894, where his father Thomas Aickin was the stationmaster.

He was in the New Zealand Expeditionary Force in World War I, having joined the Army as a 14 year old trumpeter. He served at Gallipoli and Samoa (Army Reg No 4-66).

He joined NZR in 1911.

He studied part-time at Victoria University of Wellington (VUW) for a law degree; and qualified as a lawyer.

In World War II he was a Colonel in the NZEF 16th Railway Operating Company in the Middle East; later promoted to Major.

== General Manager ==
As General Manager of NZR, he advocated for Railway electrification in New Zealand, though some of his engineering staff disagreed with this emphasis. He was a qualified lawyer and had previously been Staff Superintendent and Chief Legal Advisor to the Department.

His successor Horace Lusty favoured dieselification, except for the Wellington suburban network. Brett says that Aicken fell out with NZR colleagues and with the new National Government when he retired at only 57 years, although public servants in the Government Superannuation Fund (GSF) then usually had to retire after 40 years of service, and there is no indication on his file that there was any desire for an extension of service by him or the minister. But both his successors Horace Lusty, and Alan Gandell had their service extended.

He retired on 31 July 1951 aged 57 with 40 years of service, and died in Island Bay, Wellington on 23 July 1982 aged 88 years.
