= Railway electrification in New Zealand =

Overview of electric railway systems in New Zealand

Railway electrification in New Zealand consists of three separate electric systems, all on the North Island. Electrification was initially adopted by the New Zealand Railways for long tunnels; the Otira Tunnel, the Lyttelton Rail Tunnel and the two Tawa Tunnels of the Tawa Flat Deviation. Electrification of Wellington suburban services started with the Johnsonville Line and Kāpiti Line out of Wellington from the 1930s. Auckland suburban services were electrified in 2014–2015. Electrification of long-distance services on the North Island Main Trunk (NIMT) dates from 1986. New long tunnels, for example the Rimutaka Tunnel and the Kaimai Tunnel, were operated by diesels, and the Otira and Lyttelton Tunnels have converted to diesel operation.

From 1908 to 1953, there was an electrified mine railway from the Stockton mine on the West Coast of the South Island.

Earlier NZR electrified routes from 1923 to the 1940s operated at 1500 V DC, but the NIMT (1986) and Auckland suburban services (from 2014) use 25 kV 50 Hz AC; all with overhead catenary supply. The use of 16 kV 16.7 Hz AC for the NIMT was proposed in 1950.

== History ==
=== Stockton mine railway ===
The Stockton mine railway was, in 1908, New Zealand's first electric railway. It carried coal from the Westport-Stockton Coal Companies mine to the NZR railhead at Ngakawau on the West Coast of the South Island from 1908 to 1953, when it was replaced by an aerial cableway. The line was 10.5 km (6.5 mi) long, with 2.4 km (1.5 mi) in two long tunnels. The system used 275 V DC from a low overhead line via trolley poles, and 915 mm (3 ft) gauge track. The seven locos were of low built "mine" type.

=== Otira and Lyttelton Tunnels ===
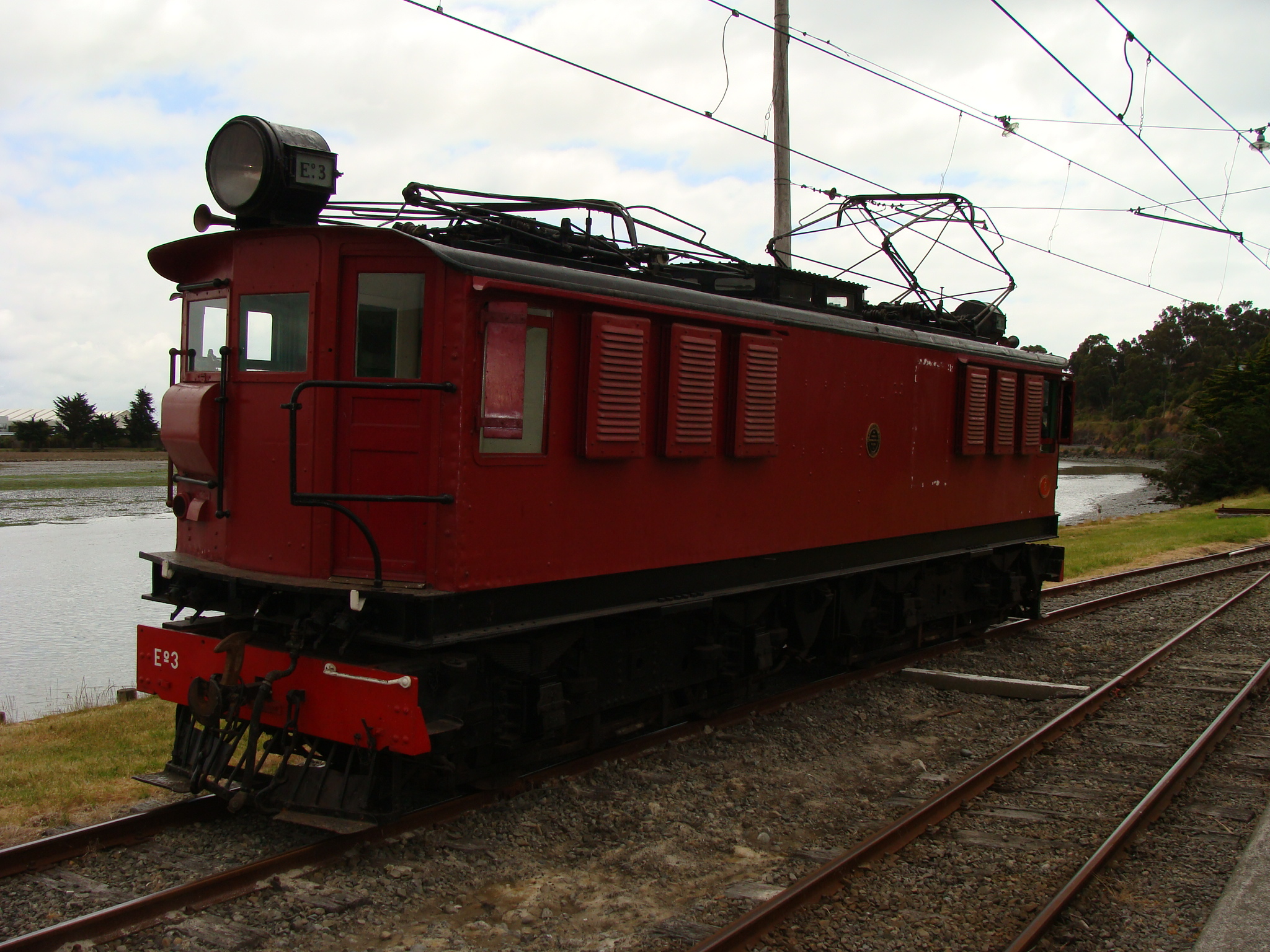
An E^{O} class locomotive as used at Otira at the Ferrymead Heritage Park on 29 November 2009.

The first NZR line to be electrified in New Zealand was the Otira Tunnel in 1923. This long tunnel (8.55 km (5.31 mi)) with a steep gradient (1 in 33) could not have been worked by steam. In 1916, there was consideration of electrification of the entire 100 km (62 mi) section with steep grades from Jackson (West Coast) to Springfield (Canterbury), but in 1923, just the Otira-Arthur's Pass section (14 km (8.7 mi)) was electrified.

On 14 February 1929, the Lyttelton Line through the Lyttelton Rail Tunnel was electrified. This tunnel (opened on 9 December 1867) was short and had a lesser gradient than the Otira (0.3%) but replacement of steam operation was desirable. Electrification of this and other lines was being studied by the Public Works Department as early as 1911.

=== The Merz & McLellan Report ===
The 1925 report by the English consulting firm of Merz & McLellan was commissioned by the Minister of Railways Gordon Coates to investigate electrification of suburban services in the four main centres of Auckland, Wellington, Christchurch and Dunedin. For Christchurch it recommended electrification of the Lyttelton Line but not the main lines north and south. Now only Auckland and Wellington have suburban passenger services. The firm's partner Charles Merz of Newcastle upon Tyne had reported on Melbourne suburban electrification in 1908 and 1912.

=== Wellington electrification ===
Several Wellington lines were then electrified: in 1938, the Johnsonville Line; and from 1940, the Kāpiti Line section of the NIMT north of Wellington to Paekakariki through the two Tawa Tunnels which were part of the Tawa Flat Deviation. This line also had steep gradients (1 in 57) on the bank from Paremata up to Pukerua Bay.

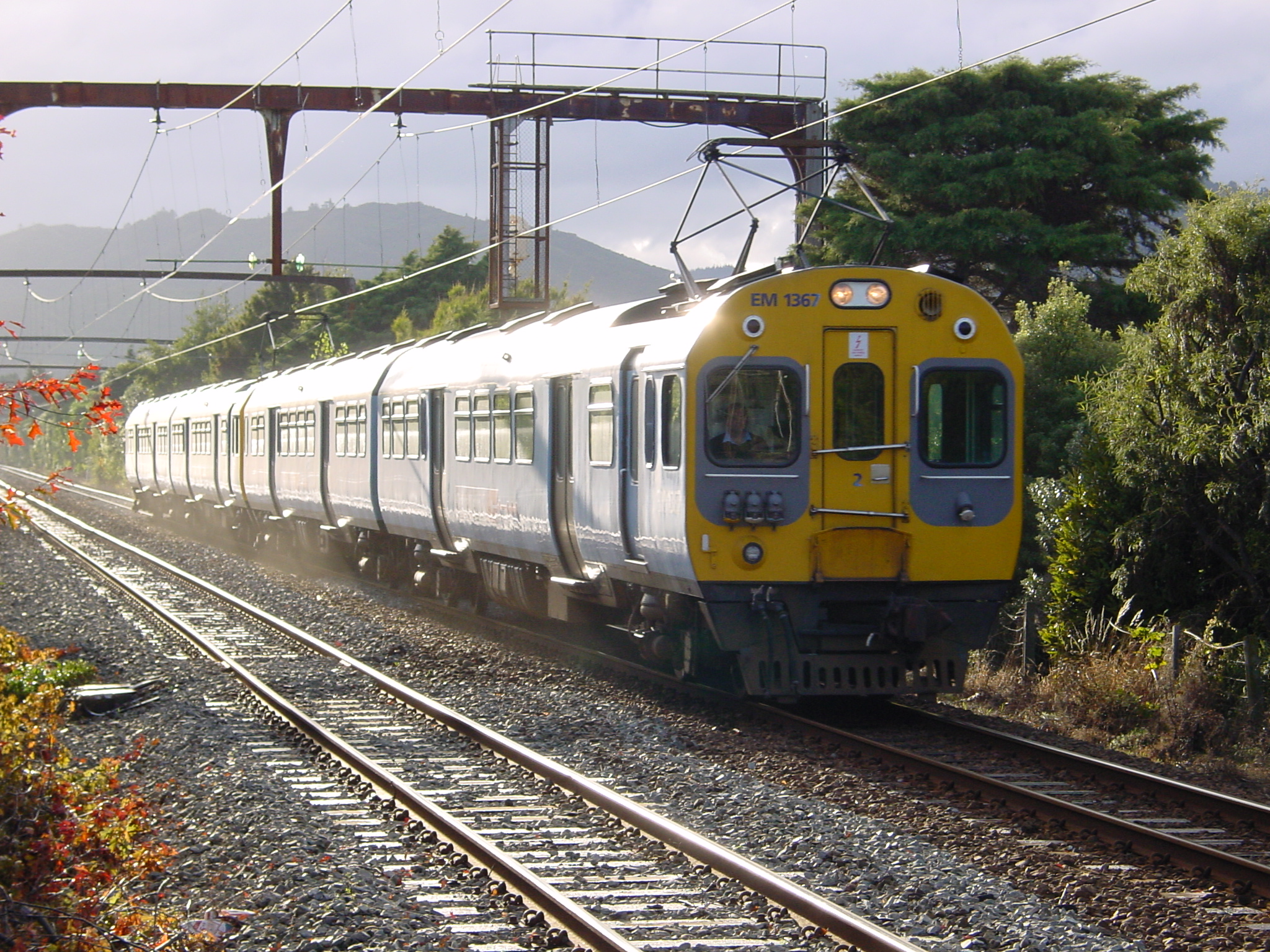
An EM Ganz-Mavag EMU on the Hutt Valley Line near Epuni, 2003

In February 1946, it was decided to electrify the remaining Wellington suburban lines to the Hutt Valley as there was a shortage of coal for locomotives, and also to replace commuter steam trains with EMUs, as the Hutt Valley was now largely residential with new state housing replacing market gardens. When the extra EMUs arrived in 1949, they were initially used for the Kāpiti Line to Paekakariki while the Hutt Valley lines to Upper Hutt and Melling were electrified. So in the Hutt Valley, EMUs were supplemented in peak periods by older carriages hauled by electric locomotives until they were replaced by the Ganz-Mavag EMUs from 1986.

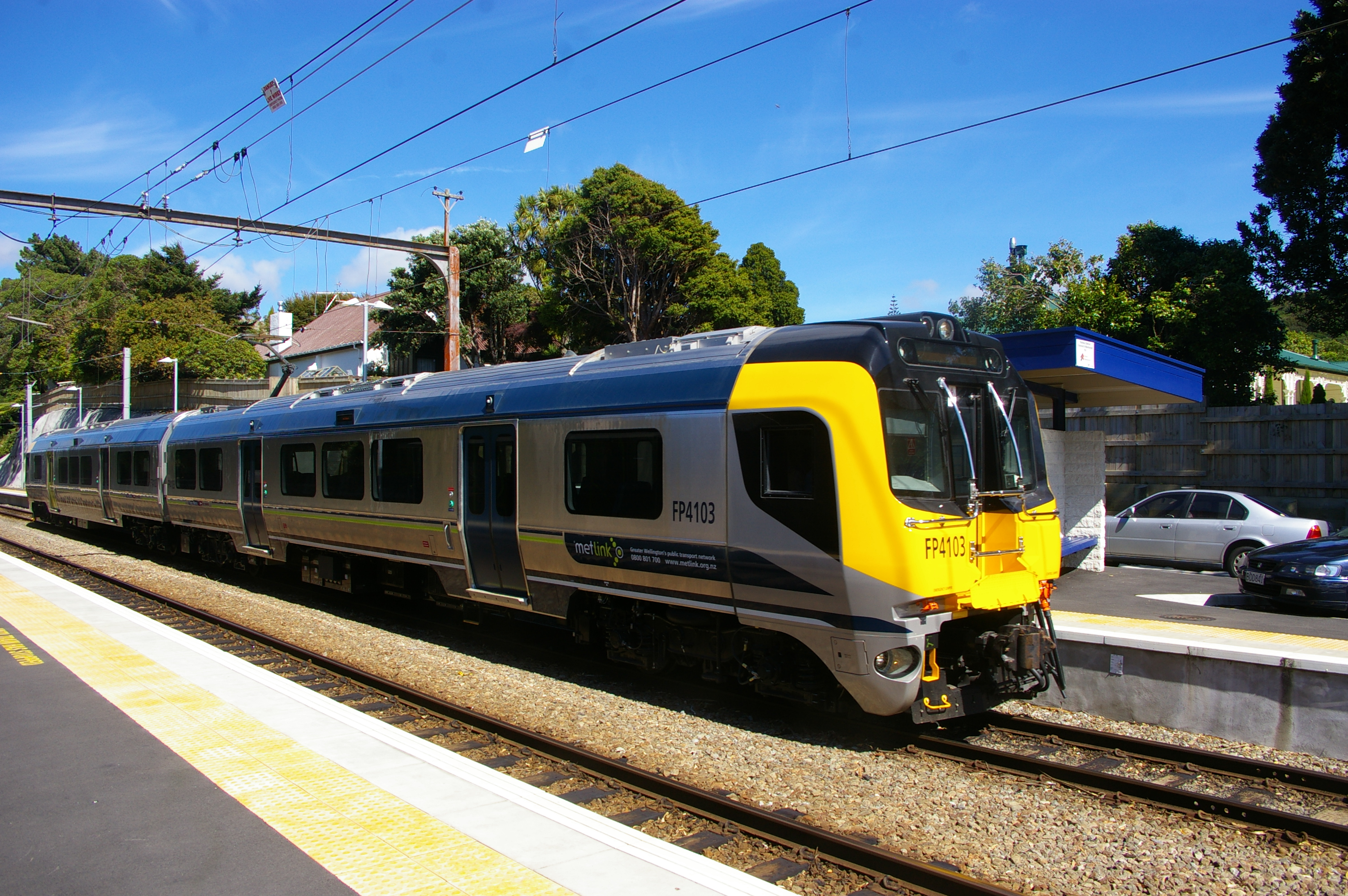
An FP class Matangi EMU at Khandallah on the Johnsonville Line, 2011

The Johnsonville and Melling lines were short branch lines which were originally part of the main line (NIMT) north and the Hutt Valley line to the Wairarapa, until the lines were replaced by deviations. The sections of these lines that were retained were mainly used for suburban commuter services, with initially some stock traffic (cattle and sheep) to Johnsonville (later to Raroa).

=== Dieselisation ===
For two new long tunnels, diesel operation was more economic than a short electrified section; the Rimutaka Tunnel (1955) and the Kaimai Tunnel (1978). The Rimutaka Tunnel required an intermediate ventilation shaft. From 1967, diesel locomotives (D^{A} class) replaced electric locomotives (E^{W} class) on freight trains south of Paekakariki on the Kāpiti Line after the track in some older tunnels on the North–South Junction were lowered, so diesels could run under the catenary into Wellington.

On two existing electrified tunnels, the electrified section was only a small part of the total line. Hence, the Lyttelton Rail Tunnel was operated by diesel locomotives from 19 September 1970. The Otira Tunnel was long and steep, so for dieselisation from 1997, a door and special ventilation fans were fitted (electrification of the whole 100 km (62 mi) Springfield to Jackson section with its steep gradients had been considered in 1906 and in the 1950s; possibly using 50 Hz AC instead of DC).

=== Electrification of the NIMT ===
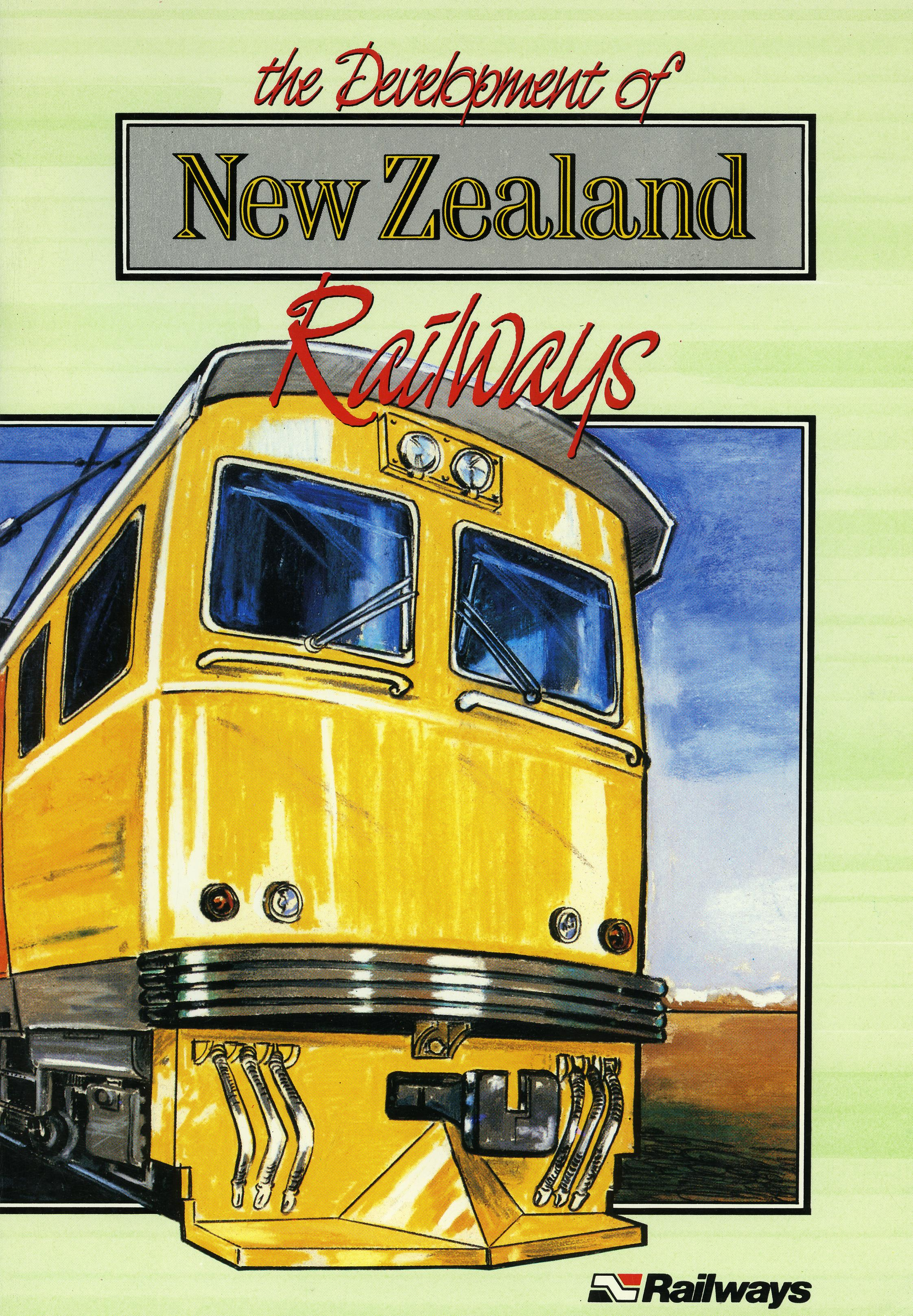
The electrification of the central section of the North Island Main Trunk was completed in 1988.

In 1950, electrification of the entire North Island Main Trunk (NIMT) from Auckland to Paekakariki (the terminus of the Wellington electrification) was proposed by the General Manager Frank Aickin; the system comprised 657 route miles or 1,000 km (620 mi) of track. Operation at 16 kV 16.7 Hz AC was proposed, so would have been similar to the systems in Austria, Germany, Sweden, Switzerland and Norway; although it has been superseded by 25 kV 50 Hz AC or 25 kV 60 Hz AC for new systems;

The NIMT represented only 12% of the network length, but carried 40% of the system tonnage (13% more than the total South Island tonnage). A hundred Bo-Bo locomotives would be required, and in Auckland, there would be suburban electric services to Henderson west of Auckland and to Papakura 34 km (21.1 mi) south of Auckland. A report by two Swedish engineers (Thelander and Edenius) was also obtained. Their report said electrification was a matter of necessity and estimated greater capital cost saving with AC electrification instead of DC (1500 V; or 3000 V as proposed by English Electric) than Aickin had allowed for. But the proposal was dropped in favour of dieselisation, with the first mainline DF class diesel locomotives arriving in 1954. However the English Electric diesel-electric locos were unreliable and delivery was slow. With the central section of the NIMT approaching saturation this was avoided in 1955 by prompt delivery of the New Zealand DA class locomotives from two factories in the United States and Canada.

In 1974, a study was undertaken to consider the looming problem of "traffic saturation" on the mountainous central section, particularly the Raurimu Spiral. In 1975, the study recommended electrification using 25 kV 50 Hz AC; but with a decline in traffic the proposal was dropped. In the late 1970s with the "oil shocks" of 1973 and 1979, the Third National Government embarked on several projects to reduce dependence on imported oil.

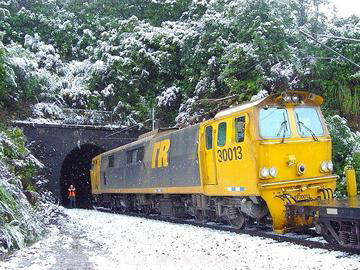
A NIMT EF locomotive in Bumble-Bee livery 10 September 2006.

Electrification of the 412 km (256 mi) centre section of the NIMT was one of the Think Big projects. The project was approved in December 1981; specifications were prepared in 1982 and tenders let in 1982–83. Other works improved the line by easing curves and gradients and replacing signalling. Work started in late 1984 and was completed in 1988 though on 24 June rather than March as planned, with an official train traversing the whole section. Brush Traction supplied 22 EF class locomotives; the design was scaled up to the Eurotunnel Class 9 locomotives supplied by Brush for the Channel Tunnel.

In December 2016, KiwiRail announced that it proposed to dieselise this section of the NIMT due to the age of the present electric locomotives and the cost and time delays in changing locomotives at each end of the electrified section at Te Rapa and Palmerston North. The decision was reversed in 2018.

=== Electrification of the Auckland suburban network ===
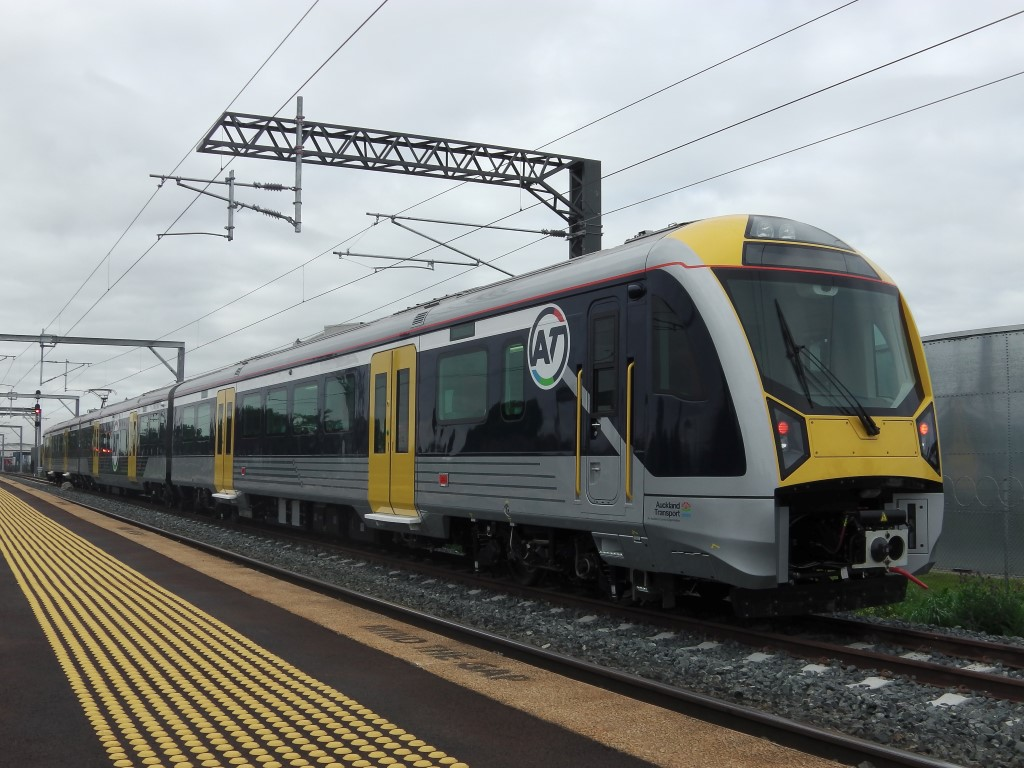
A new AM class electric multiple unit at Puhinui in 2013, introduced as part of railway electrification in Auckland.

The extensive suburban rail network around Auckland which had been operated by steam locomotives and then by diesel locomotives and railcars was electrified using 25 kV 50 Hz AC between April 2014 and July 2015. Electrification goes south to Pukekohe, and there are no immediate plans to extend further south on the NIMT to Hamilton (the Waikato Connection and earlier Auckland-Hamilton passenger services did not succeed; though Te Huia is now operating). In 2020, the government announced funding to extend electrification from Papakura to Pukekohe. In 2021, New Zealand rail operator KiwiRail secured independent panel approval of the resource consents for the main works related to its electrification project in South Auckland. The sanction for the electrification of the rail line between Papakura and Pukekohe has been given as per the COVID-19 fast-track legislation. Electrification works between Papakura and Pukekohe were completed in August 2024.

== Existing systems ==
=== Auckland metro ===
All electrified lines in the Auckland metro area uses the 25 kV 50 Hz AC system.

The system is fed from Transpower's 220 kV grid at three locations: Penrose, Southdown, and Glen Eden with a fourth feed planned to start construction at Drury in late 2026.

=== North Island Main Trunk ===
The North Island Main Trunk uses 25 kV 50 Hz AC. The system used is a 25-0-25 kV auto-transformer system, with autotransformers spaced along the line interconnecting the "positive" 25 kV contact line, earth, and the "negative" 25 kV feeder line.

The system is fed at four traction substations, taking power from Transpower's 220 kV national grid.

NIMT traction substations
Name	Location	Type	Notes
Bunnythorpe	40.2841°S 175.6323°E	Feeder	
Tangiwai	39.4640°S 175.5751°E	Feeder	
Taumarunui	38.8892°S 175.3212°E	Feeder	
Hamilton	37.7967°S 175.2660°E	Feeder	

=== Wellington metro ===
All electrified lines in the Wellington metro area use the 1500 V DC system.

- Johnsonville Line: completed 2 June 1938.
- Kāpiti Line: Wellington Railway Station to Paekakariki completed 24 July 1940; extended to Paraparaumu 7 May 1983; extended to Waikanae 20 February 2011.
- Hutt Valley Line: Wellington Distant Junction to Taita completed 14 September 1953; extended to Upper Hutt 24 July 1955.
- Melling Line: Hutt Valley Junction to Lower Hutt (Western Hutt) completed 23 September 1953; extended to Melling 1 March 1954.

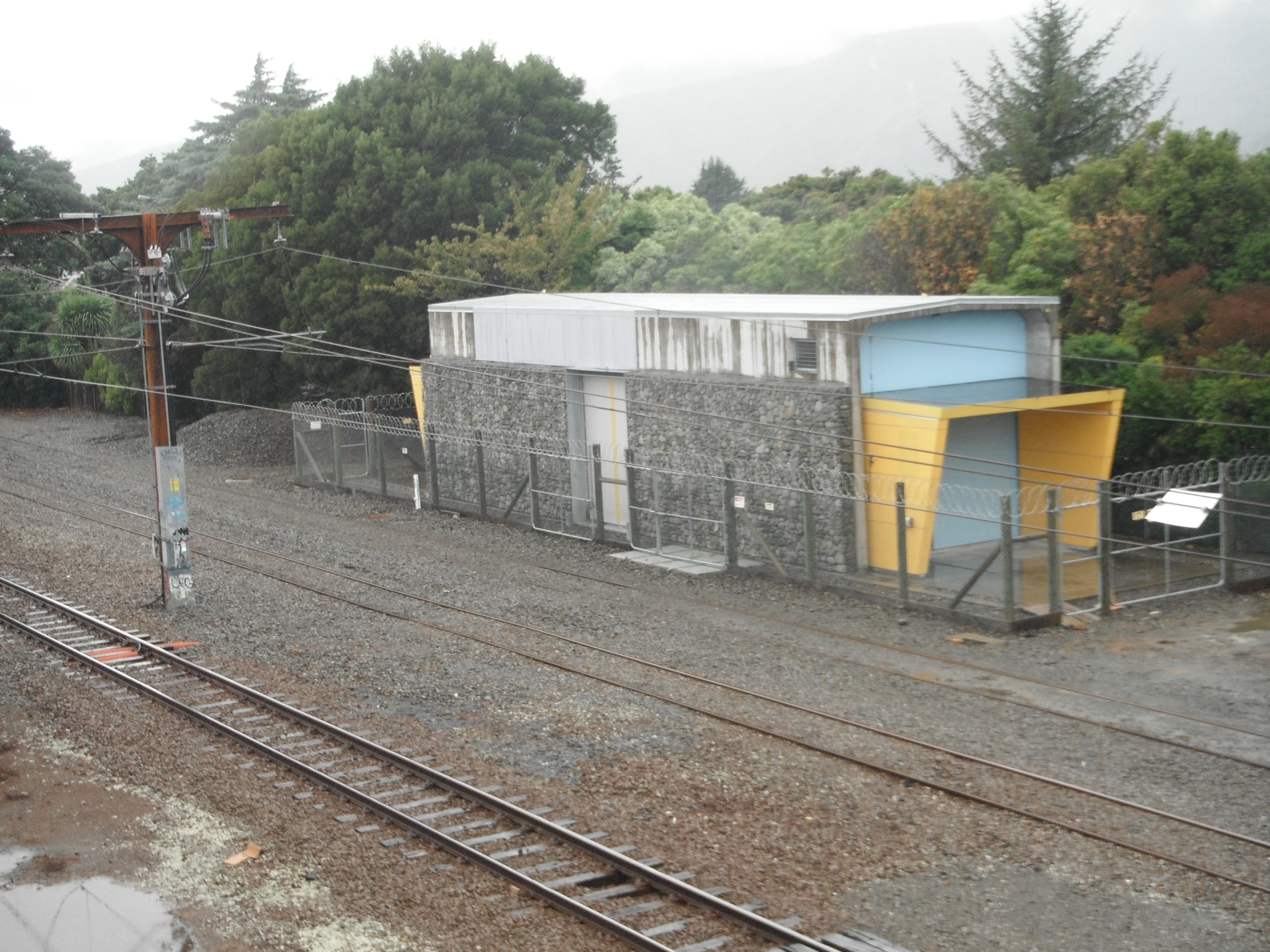
Woburn traction substation on the Hutt Valley Line

The Wellington metro system is fed by 18 traction substations, taking power from Wellington Electricity's (Wellington metro) or Electra's (Kāpiti Coast) 11 kV distribution networks. There are also a number of cross-tie substations, which do not feed electricity into the lines but perform switching functions.

Wellington metro traction substations
Name	Location	Notes
Epuni	41.2074°S 174.9304°E	cross-tie substation
Glenside	41.2018°S 174.8199°E	
Heretaunga	41.1471°S 174.9910°E	cross-tie substation
Kaiwharawhara	41.2532°S 174.8044°E	
Khandallah	41.2428°S 174.7936°E	
Lindale	40.8915°S 175.0300°E	
Lower Hutt	41.2139°S 174.8871°E	
Mana	41.0943°S 174.8678°E	
Ngaio	41.2521°S 174.7707°E	
Ngauranga		cross-tie substation
Paremata	41.1234°S 174.8501°E	
Paekakariki		
Petone	41.2175°S 174.8804°E	
Pomare	41.1718°S 174.9680°E	
Pukerua Bay	41.0428°S 174.8837°E	
Raumati	40.9367°S 174.9952°E	
Rocky Point	41.2311°S 174.8413°E	cross-tie substation
Silverstream	41.1471°S 174.9910°E	
Tawa	41.1680°S 174.8289°E	cross-tie substation
Upper Hutt	41.1276°S 175.0673°E	
Waikanae		
Wellington	41.2749°S 174.7841°E	
Woburn	41.2201°S 174.9127°E	

== Future ==
In 2008, a paper was produced by former New Zealand Rail senior managers Murray King and Francis Small, on the extension of the NIMT 25 kV electrification from Te Rapa to Papakura and Hamilton to Tauranga. The report put the total cost of electrification at $860 million, with $433 million for the Papakura-Te Rapa section. It concluded that money would be better spent on grade and curvature easements, removing speed restrictions and increasing the length of passing loops.

The 2023 New Zealand budget set aside $369.2 million for 4 years between 2023 and 2026 for the Rail Network Improvement Programme, which included funding for a detailed business case for the electrification of the North Island Main Trunk.

In December 2024 the government announced funding of $137.2 million for five additional substations for power for the new Wairarapa and Manawatu trains and to enable additional 15-minute trains on existing lines.
