= Mayor of Ruapehu =

- Incumbent; Weston Kirton since 2022
- Style: His/Her Worship
- Term length: Three years, renewable
- Formation: 1989
- Deputy: Brenda Ralph
- Salary: $120,497
- Website: Official website

The mayor of Ruapehu officiates over the Ruapehu District Council.

== History ==
The Ruapehu District was created in the 1989 local government reforms. The mayor from 1995 to 2001 was Weston Kirton. Elected to the mayoralty in 2001, Sue Morris sought to brand Ruapehu as more tourist friendly, but faced challenges with maintaining public facilities within a dwindling local economy. Don Cameron was mayor from 2013 to 2022. After a break of 21 years, Weston Kirton was elected mayor again in 2022.

== List of mayors ==
	Mayor	Portrait	Term of office
1	Garrick Workman		1989–1995
2	Weston Kirton		1995–2001
3	Sue Morris		2001–2013
4	Don Cameron		2013–2022
(2)	Weston Kirton		2022–present

== List of deputy mayors ==
^{†} Died in office

	Deputy mayor	Portrait	Term	Mayor
1	Weston Kirton		1989–1992	Workman
2	Graeme Cosford		1992–1995	Workman
3	Bob Peck		1995–1998	Kirton
4	Bob Vine		1998–2001	Kirton
5	John Compton		2001–2004	Morris
6	Craig Woolliams		2004–c. 2006	Morris
7	Warren Furner		fl.2007–2008	Morris
(5)	John Compton		2008–2010	Morris
8	Don Cameron		2010–2013	Morris
9	Marion Gillard		2013–2018^{[†]}	Cameron
10	Karen Ngatai		2018–2022	Cameron
11	Vivienne Hoeta		2022–2025	Kirton
12	Brenda Ralph		2025–present	Kirton
