= Horace Lusty =

New Zealand Railways general manager

Horace Campbell Lusty (11 June 1895 – 23 April 1972) was the General Manager of New Zealand Railways from 1951 to 1955.

== Biography ==
He was born on 11 June 1895 at Petone, and died on 24 April 1972.

He joined the NZR staff as an engineering cadet on 5 February 1912. He was appointed as a draughtsman on 5 December 1917.

He was commended in 1921 for his efforts in suppressing a bush fire at Horopito, which was threatening railway houses on 14 January.

He was stationed in Christchurch, Dunedin, Greymouth, Invercargill, Ohakune, and Wellington.

He was appointed Assistant Chief Engineer on 6 October 1936, Chief Engineer on 1 September 1944, and General Manager on 1 August 1951.

In 1946-47 he studied railway engineering in Australia, South Africa, the United Kingdom, Sweden, Canada, and the United States. He oversaw the replacement of steam traction by diesel traction in the 1950s. He had 40 years of contributory service to the Government Superannuation Fund (GSF) on 4 February 1952 but his service was extended by three years.

In 1953, Lusty was awarded the Queen Elizabeth II Coronation Medal.

He retired on 31 March 1955. He opted for 3 months salary, not 6 months retiring leave (requiring confirmation by Treasury).

He was on the Council of the New Zealand Institution of Engineers (NZIE) in 1942 and president in 1949. He was appointed a Director of Clyde Industries (the Australian manufacturer of the New Zealand DA class locomotive) on 2 July 1957.
