= Ruapehu District Council =

Territorial authority of New Zealand

Coordinates: 38.8856308°S 175.2614936°E

Ruapehu District Council Te Kaunihera ā-Rohe o Ruapehu

Type
- Type: Unicameral of Ruapehu District
- Houses: Governing Body
- Term limits: None

History
- Founded: 6 March 1989

Leadership
- Mayor: Weston Kirton

Structure
- Seats: 10 seats (1 mayor, 6 general ward seats, 3 māori seats)
- Length of term: 3 years

Website
- ruapehudc.govt.nz

Ruapehu District Council (Māori: Te Kaunihera ā-Rohe o Ruapehu) is the territorial authority for the Ruapehu District of New Zealand.

The council consists of the mayor of Ruapehu, Weston Kirton, and 9 ward councillors.

== Composition ==
=== Councillors ===
- Mayor: Weston Kirton
- General Ward: six councillors
- Māori Ward: three councillors

=== Community boards ===
- Ōwhango-National Park Community Board: five elected members, one appointed councillor
- Taumarunui-Ōhura Ward Community Board: five elected members, one appointed councillor
- Waimarino-Waiouru Community Board: five elected members, one appointed councillor

== History ==
The council was established in 1989, through the merger of Taumarunui County Council (established in 1910), Ohakune County Council (established in 1911), and Raetihi County Council (established in 1921).
