= Waiouru railway station =

Railway station in New Zealand

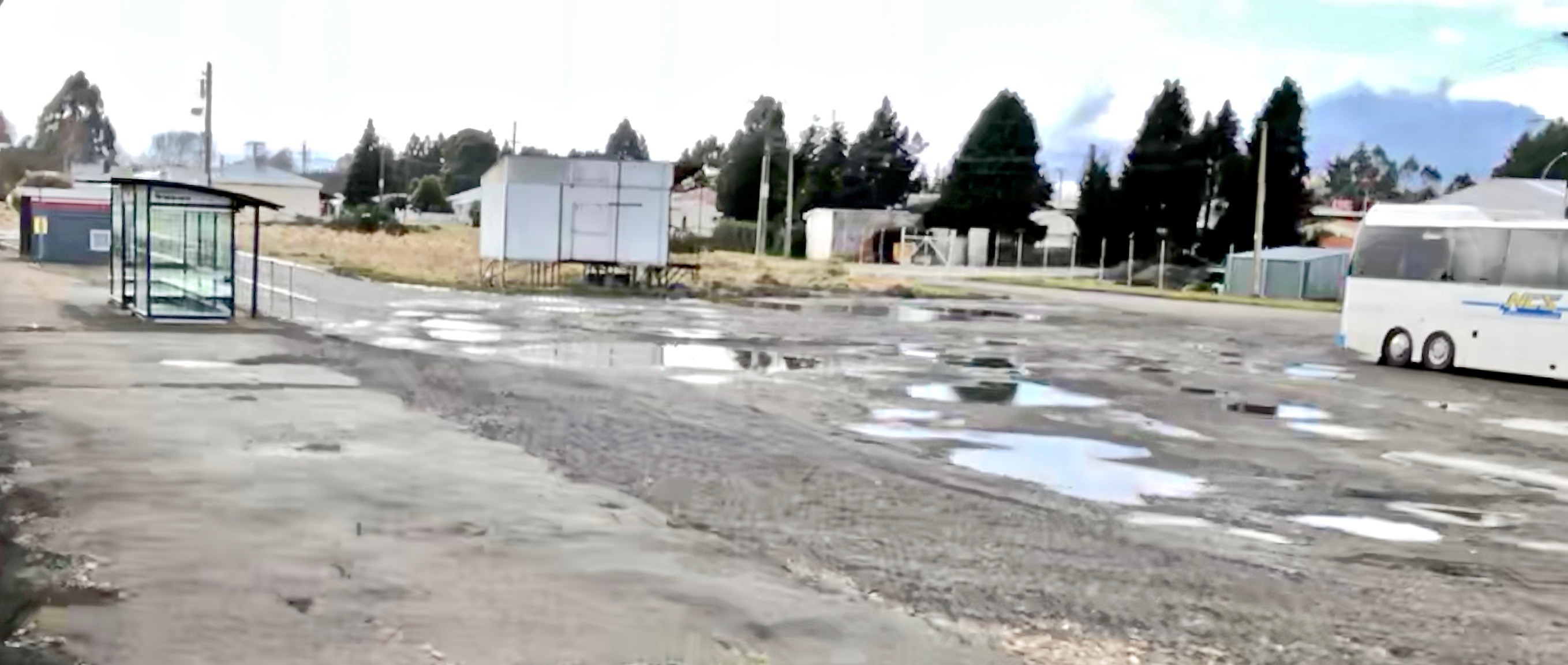
- Waiouru railway station in 2018

General information
- Location: New Zealand
- Coordinates: 39.480659°S 175.667095°E
- Elevation: 813.82 m (2,670.0 ft)
- Line: North Island Main Trunk
- Distance: Wellington 290.30 km (180.38 mi)

History
- Opened: 1 March 1907
- Closed: 10 April 2005
- Electrified: June 1988

Services
Preceding station	Historical railways	Following station
Tangiwai; Line open, station closed	North Island Main Trunk; KiwiRail	Hīhītahi; Line open, station closed
Location

Waiouru railway station in Waiouru, New Zealand was an intermediate station on the North Island Main Trunk line. It was opened for goods traffic in March 1907, and for passengers on 1 July 1908. At 814 m above sea level, the station was the highest station on the New Zealand rail system.

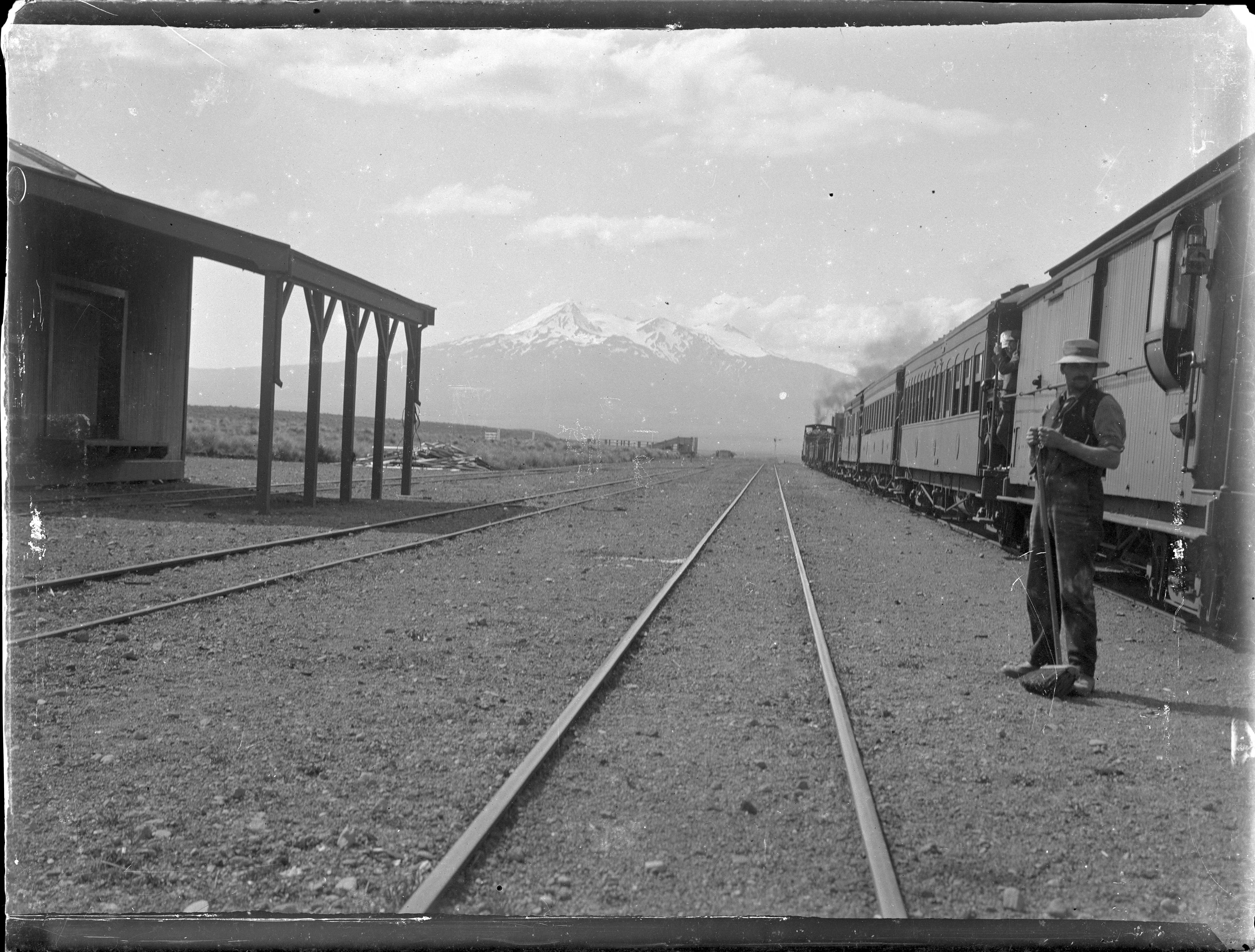
Train at Waiouru Railway Station circa 1930s

The last passenger train on the NIMT to stop at Waiouru was the Overlander, but from 10 April 2005 it no longer stopped here. The station had been closed for goods traffic on 13 October 1986.

In 1940 a branch was built to the military camp, including a 1,000 ft (300 m) platform. The branch opened on 15 November 1940. It stretched about 2 km (1.2 mi) north east from the station and was still in place in 1966.

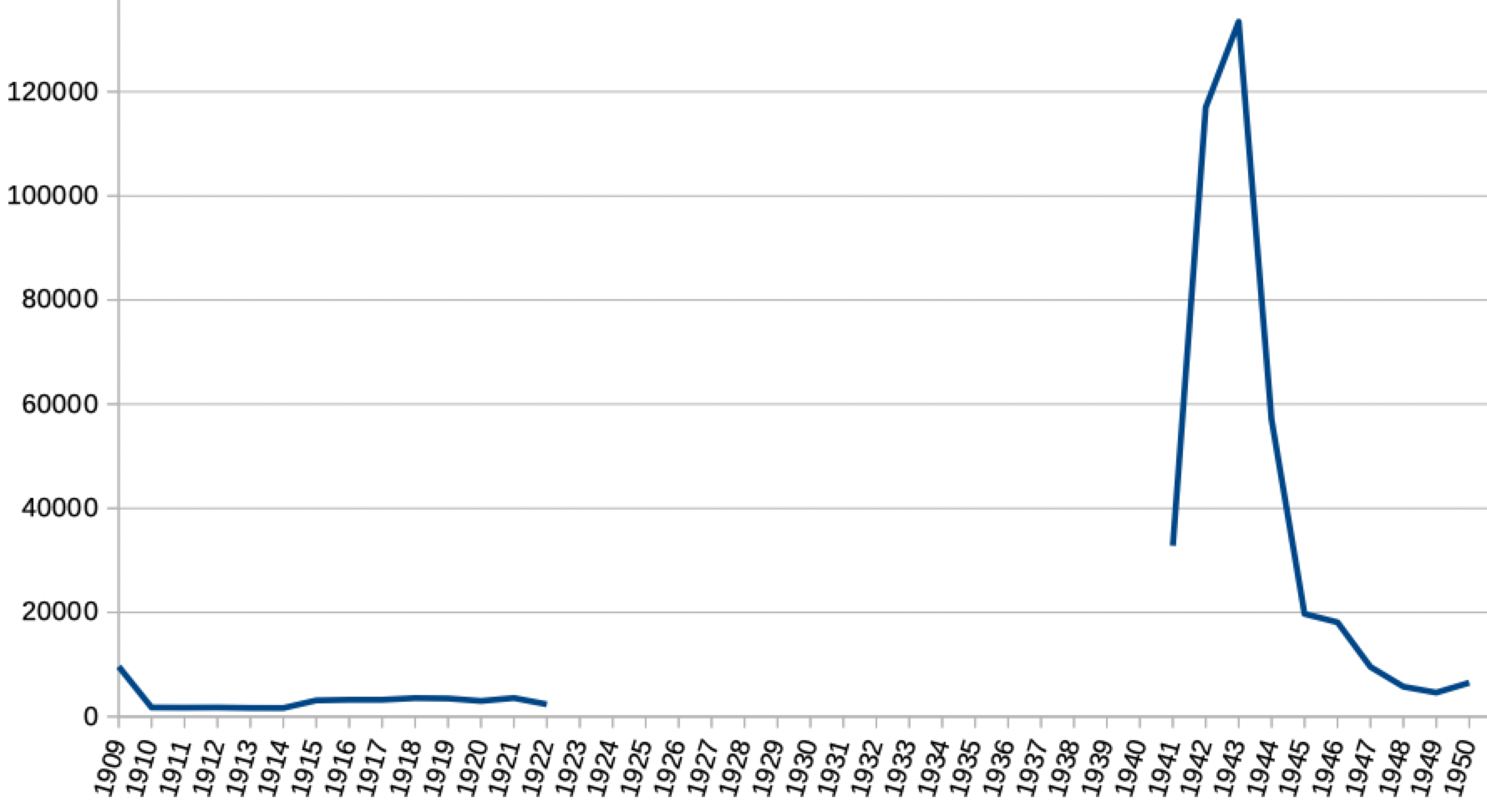
tickets sales 1909–22 and 1941-50 – derived from annual returns to Parliament of "Statement of Revenue for each Station for the Year ended"
