= Ruapehu District =

- Territorial authority district
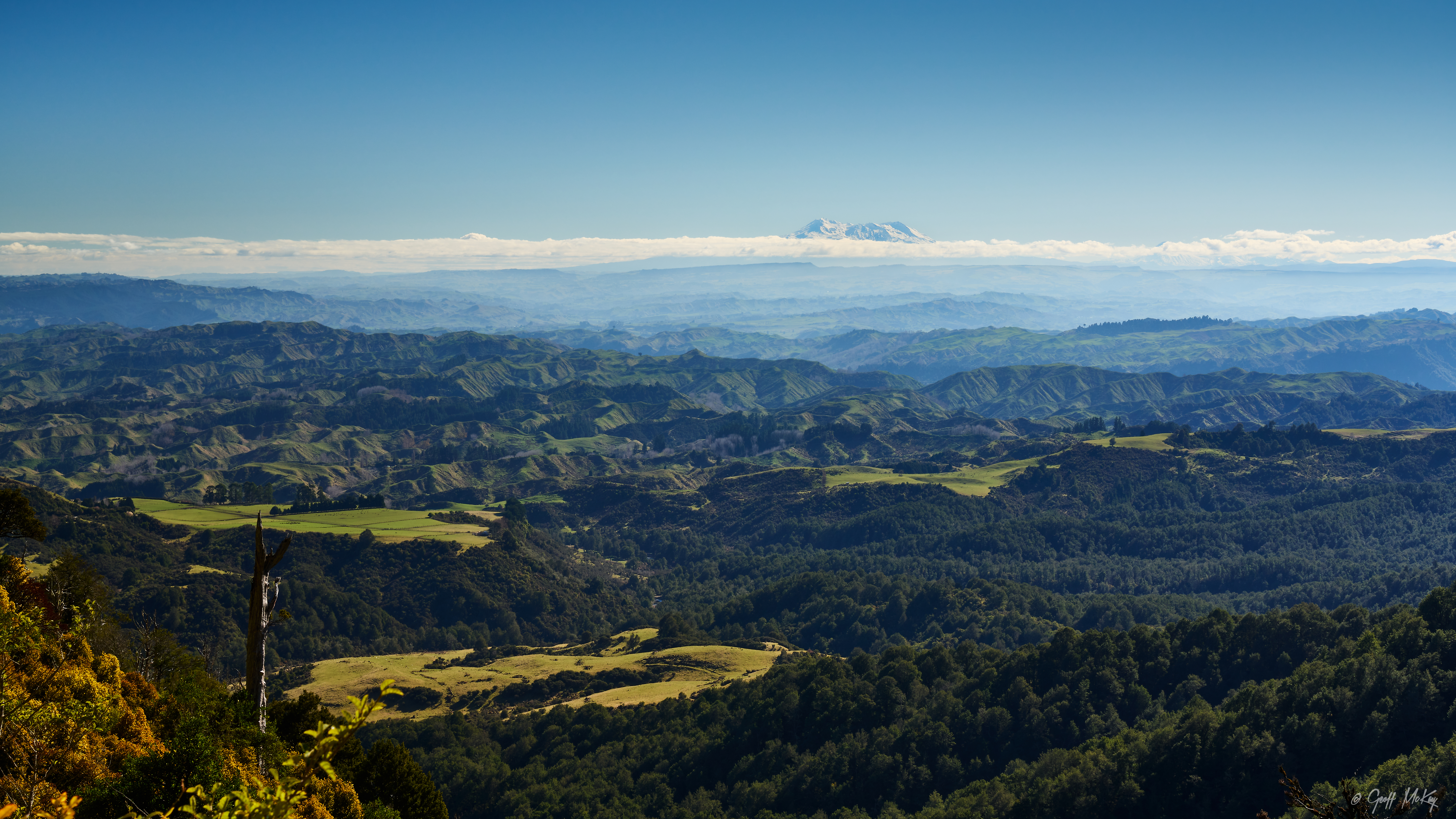

- Ruapehu district within the North Island
- Coordinates: 38°48′14″S 175°15′43″E
- Country: New Zealand
- Island: North Island
- Region: Manawatū-Whanganui
- Wards: General; Māori
- Named for: Mount Ruapehu
- Seat: Taumarunui
- Towns: List: National Park; Ohakune; Ōhura; Ōwhango; Raetihi; Waiouru; Whakapapa Village

Government
  - Mayor: Weston Kirton
  - Deputy Mayor: Vivienne Hoeta
  - Chief Executive: Clive Manley
  - Territorial authority: Ruapehu District Council

Area
  - Land: 6,734.44 km^{2} (2,600.18 sq mi)
- Highest elevation: 2,797 m (9,177 ft)

Population (June 2025)
  - Total: 13,450
  - Density: 1.997/km^{2} (5.173/sq mi)
- Time zone: UTC+12 (NZST)
  - Summer (DST): UTC+13 (NZDT)
- Postcode(s): Map of postcodes
- Area codes: 07 (northern and central); 06 (southern)
- Website: www.ruapehudc.govt.nz

Ruapehu District is a territorial authority in the centre of New Zealand's North Island.

It has an area of 6,734 square kilometers and the district's population in June 2025 was 13,450.

== Features ==
The district is landlocked, and contains the western half of the Tongariro National Park, including Mount Ruapehu and the western sides of Mount Ngauruhoe and Mount Tongariro, as well as part of the Whanganui National Park. The district is also home to the world-famous Raurimu Spiral on the North Island Main Trunk railway line.

The tourist towns of Raetihi, Whakapapa Village, National Park, and Ohakune are located near Mount Ruapehu in the south-east of the district. Waiouru, with an elevation of 815 metres, is in the extreme south-east of the district and houses the large Waiouru Army Camp. The southern section of the infamous Desert Road section of State Highway 1 runs through the east of the district, from Waiouru to Rangipo.

== Demographics ==
Ruapehu District covers 6,734.44 km^{2} (2,600.18 sq mi) and had an estimated population of 13,450 as of June 2025, with a population density of 2.0 people per km^{2}.

Historical population
Year	Pop.	±% p.a.
2006	13,572	—
2013	11,844	−1.93%
2018	12,309	+0.77%
2023	13,095	+1.25%

Ruapehu District had a population of 13,095 in the 2023 New Zealand census, an increase of 786 people (6.4%) since the 2018 census, and an increase of 1,251 people (10.6%) since the 2013 census. There were 6,720 males, 6,333 females and 42 people of other genders in 5,412 dwellings. 2.3% of people identified as LGBTIQ+. The median age was 39.0 years (compared with 38.1 years nationally). There were 2,799 people (21.4%) aged under 15 years, 2,217 (16.9%) aged 15 to 29, 5,688 (43.4%) aged 30 to 64, and 2,391 (18.3%) aged 65 or older.

People could identify as more than one ethnicity. The results were 68.8% European (Pākehā); 45.7% Māori; 3.5% Pasifika; 3.6% Asian; 0.6% Middle Eastern, Latin American and African New Zealanders (MELAA); and 2.3% other, which includes people giving their ethnicity as "New Zealander". English was spoken by 96.8%, Māori language by 11.5%, Samoan by 0.2% and other languages by 5.0%. No language could be spoken by 2.2% (e.g. too young to talk). New Zealand Sign Language was known by 0.5%. The percentage of people born overseas was 10.9, compared with 28.8% nationally.

Religious affiliations were 27.6% Christian, 0.5% Hindu, 0.3% Islam, 5.2% Māori religious beliefs, 0.4% Buddhist, 0.7% New Age, and 1.1% other religions. People who answered that they had no religion were 55.4%, and 9.3% of people did not answer the census question.

Of those at least 15 years old, 957 (9.3%) people had a bachelor's or higher degree, 5,967 (58.0%) had a post-high school certificate or diploma, and 3,096 (30.1%) people exclusively held high school qualifications. The median income was $33,800, compared with $41,500 nationally. 597 people (5.8%) earned over $100,000 compared to 12.1% nationally. The employment status of those at least 15 was that 5,025 (48.8%) people were employed full-time, 1,371 (13.3%) were part-time, and 372 (3.6%) were unemployed.

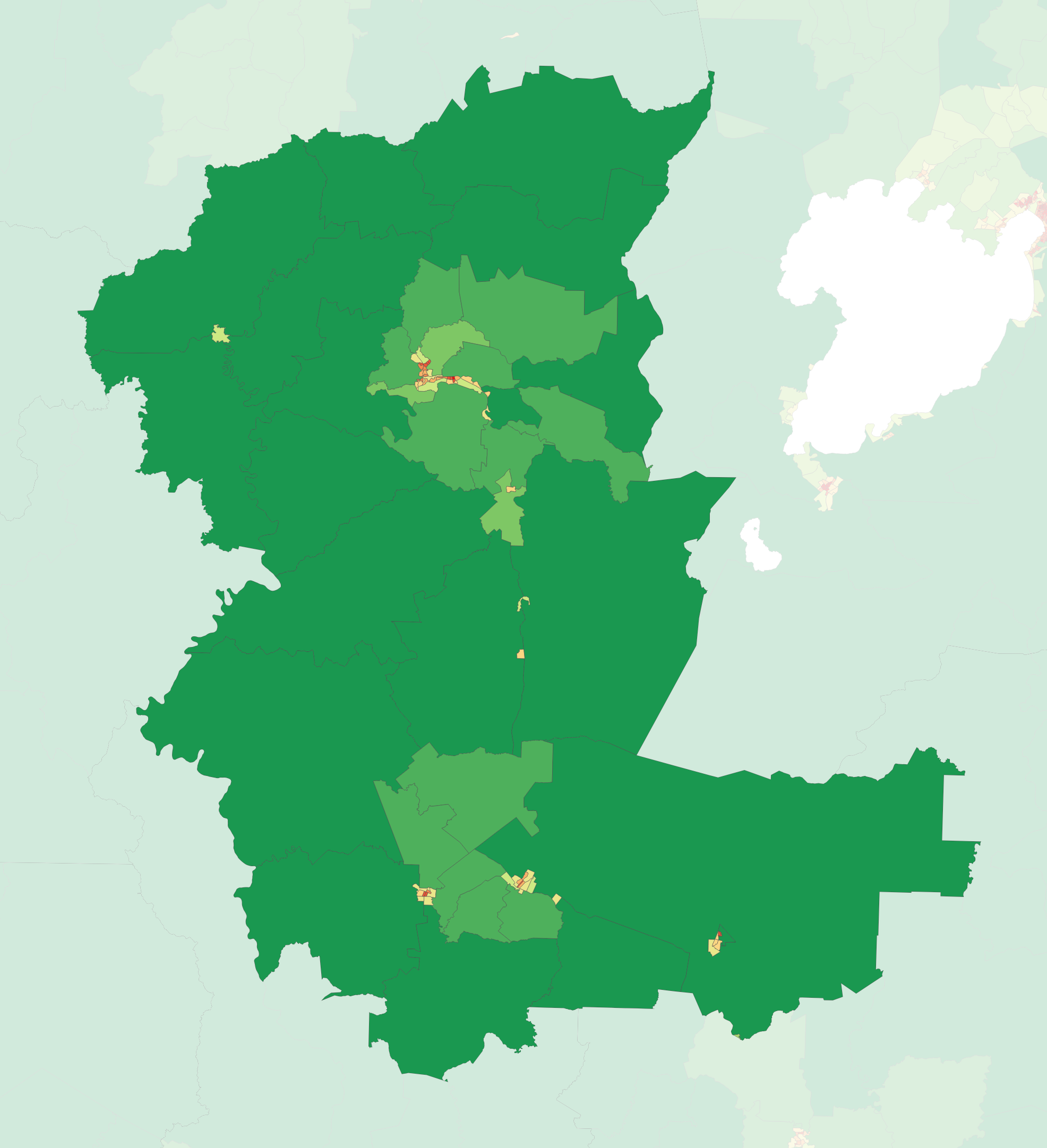
Population density in the 2023 census

== Governmental ==
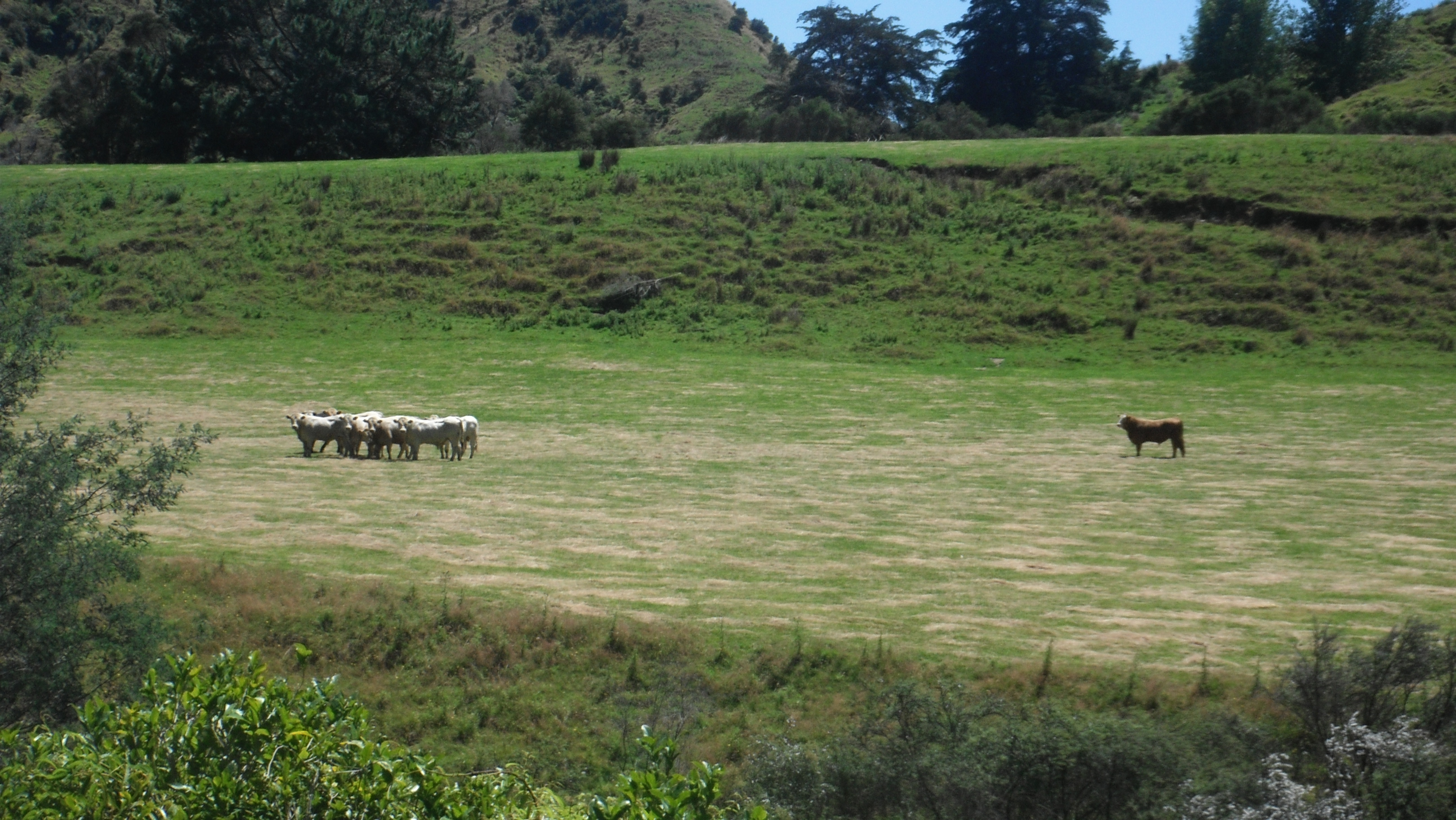
Cattle in Ruapehu District along Ruatiti Road

=== Ruapehu District Council ===
The Ruapehu District Council was established by the 1989 local government reforms. It was formed from the Taumarunui Borough Council, Taumarunui County Council, Waimarino District Council and parts of the Rangitikei County, Taupo District, Waitomo District and Stratford District councils.

The council is made up of 12 elected councillors, including a mayor and deputy mayor. The district is also served by 2 Community Boards and a Ward Committee, with the same functions and powers as the Community Boards.

In the 2022 local body elections, there were two wards, a general ward and a Māori ward.

==== Mayor ====
The current mayor of the Ruapehu District is Weston Kirton, the deputy mayor is Vivienne Hoeta.

==== Council ====
- Taumarunui-Ohura^{♮} Community Board; 5 elected community representatives and 1 appointed Councillor.
- Waimarino-Waiouru Community Board; 5 elected community representatives and 1 appointed Councillor.
- Owhango-National Park Community Board; 5 elected community representatives and 1 appointed Councilor.
