= Wanganui Education Board =

Provinces were abolished in New Zealand and the central government took control of education. The Education Act 1877 established twelve regional education boards, including this the Wanganui Education Board.

== Timeline ==
- 1892 - Wanganui Technical School - founded by the Wanganui Education Board
- 1905 - End of year figures: Schools 85, teaching staff 374, number of pupils 12,983. (Student teacher ratio: 34.7) gross revenue £78,078.
- 1906 - "The Wanganui Education Board has jurisdiction over a district which comprises the Counties of Wanganui, Waitotara, Hawera, Patea, Waimarino, Rangitikei, Oroua, Kairanga, Kiwitea, Pohangina, and Manawatu". - The offices of the Wanganui Education Board are in Nixon Street.

== Primary schools ==
Name of school	Original borough or county	Suburb or riding	Opened	First principal	Closed	Most recent principal	Web or image URL	Maximum known roll (MKR)	Year of MKR	Geo-location
Matarawa	Wanganui Borough?	6 miles from Whanganui	1855							
Westmere	Wanganui Borough?		1894	Miss Emma P Laird	No					
Whakahoro	Kaitieke County	Retaruke Riding			1950s?					Confluence of Whanganui and Retaruke Rivers
Maungaroa	Kaitieke County	Retaruke Riding			1944?					39.120337°S 175.134479°E
Kaitieke	Kaitieke County	Near Raurimu	23 February 1910		No					
Raurimu		Near Owhango			1970s?					
Ōwhango	Taumarunui County				No					
Kakahi	Taumarunui County	Near Owhango			No					38.934694°S 175.382746°E
Piriaka	Taumarunui County	Near Manunui			Yes		[			
Manunui	Taumarunui Borough	Manunui			No					
National Park	?		1 July 1925		No					
Hokowhitu	Palmerston North Borough		5 February 1924	Mr G.K. Hamilton.	No					

== Secondary schools ==
Name of school	Original borough or county	Suburb or riding	Opened	First principal	Closed	Most recent principal	Web or image URL	Max known roll (MKR)	Year of MKR
Taumarunui	Taumarunui Borough				No				
Raurimu					1950s? Burned down				
Apiti DHS	Wanganui Borough?								
