= Whakahoro =

Whakahoro Whakahoro
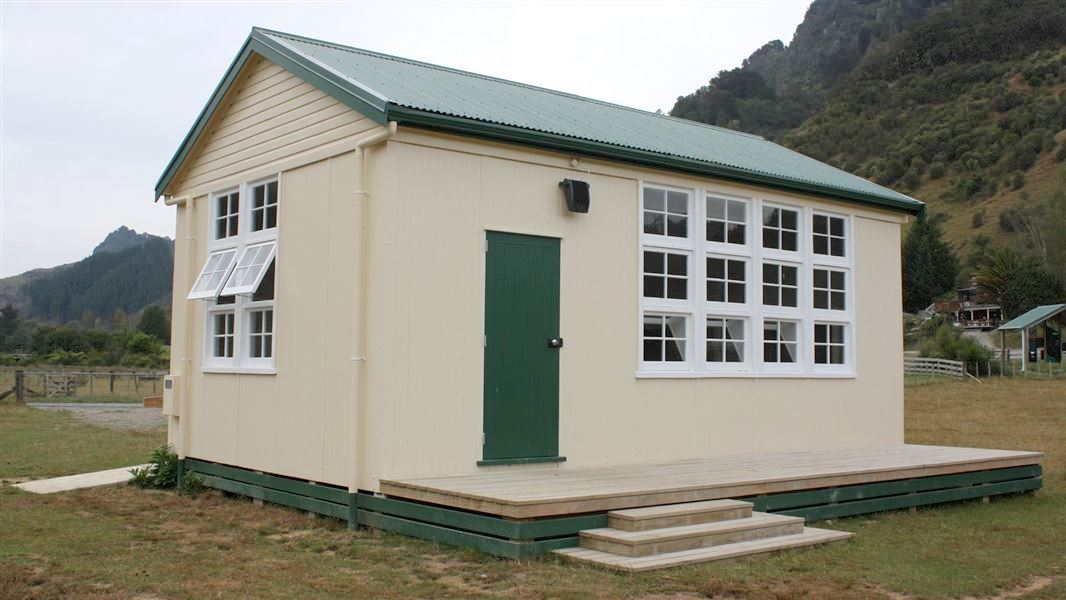
- Old Whakahoro School building, now run by DOC as a hut on the Whanganui Journey.
- Interactive map of Whakahoro
- Coordinates: 39°06′30″S 175°04′15″E
- Country: New Zealand
- Region: Manawatū-Whanganui
- District: Ruapehu District
- Ward: National Park

Whakahoro is a small (now mostly empty) settlement located south of Taumarunui on the junction of the Retaruke and Whanganui Rivers, about 104 mi (167 km) upstream from Whanganui. By gravel roads it is 41 km (25 mi) west of Raurimu and 44 km (27 mi) south west of Ōwhango.

The settlement lies close to the northern edge of the Whanganui National Park in a rugged and largely inaccessible part of the country, connected to the national road network only via Oio Road, which links it to SH 4 via the townships of Retaruke and Kaitieke. Whakahoro is located on Te Araroa, a major walking route which stretches the length of New Zealand and follows the Whanganui River for part of its length. Tree planting has been done in the 21st century, but many sheep and wild pigs remain.

The settlement's name is from Māori, and means "To break into pieces".

Wade's Landing has made itself into various modern hand-held GPS databases, probably due to its historical nautical significance.

Today a bus tour includes Whakahoro, or a jetboat can be chartered locally to take passengers up river to Taumarunui or down river to Pipiriki and Jerusalem.

== History ==
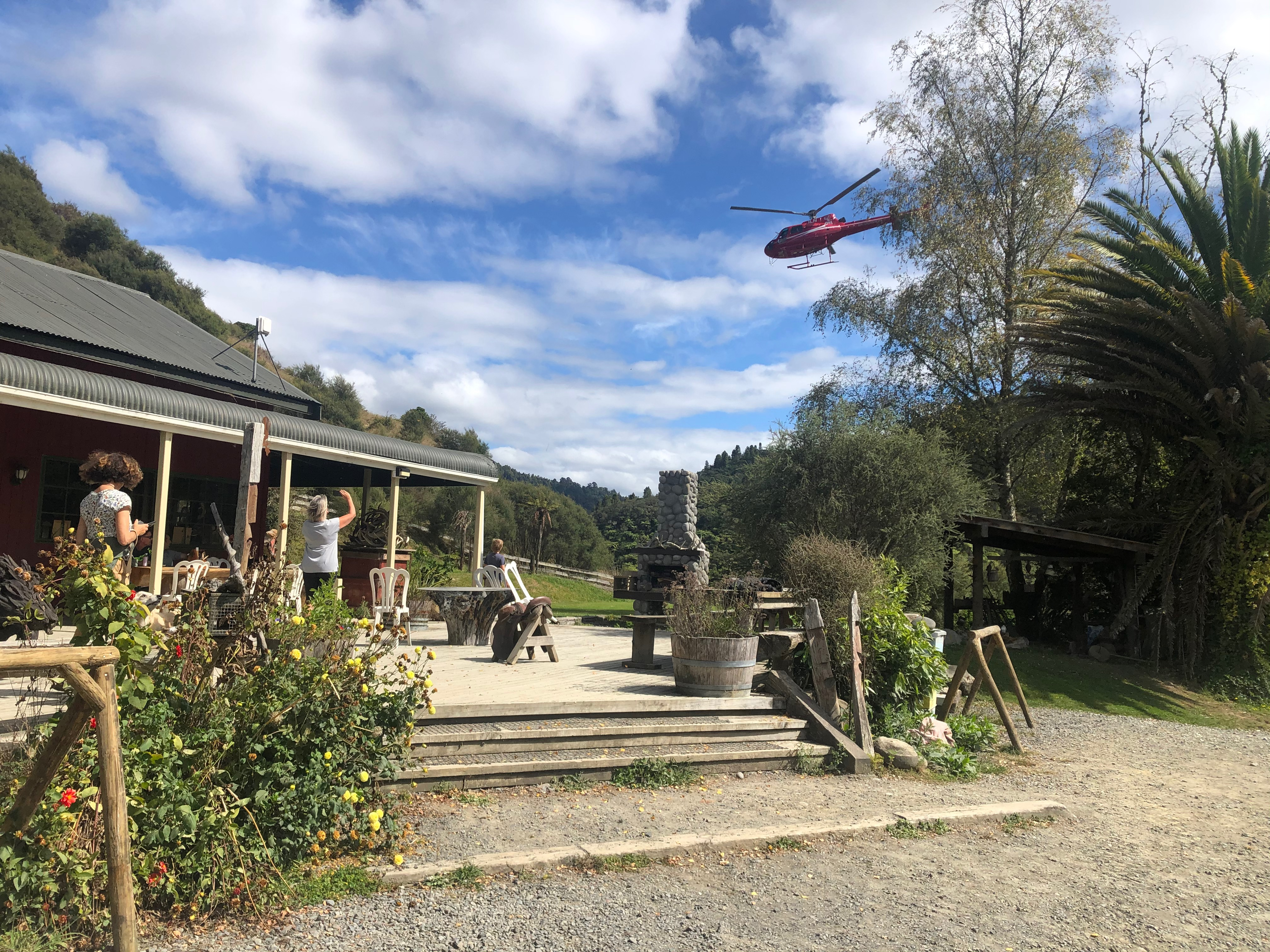
Blue Duck Café and helicopter

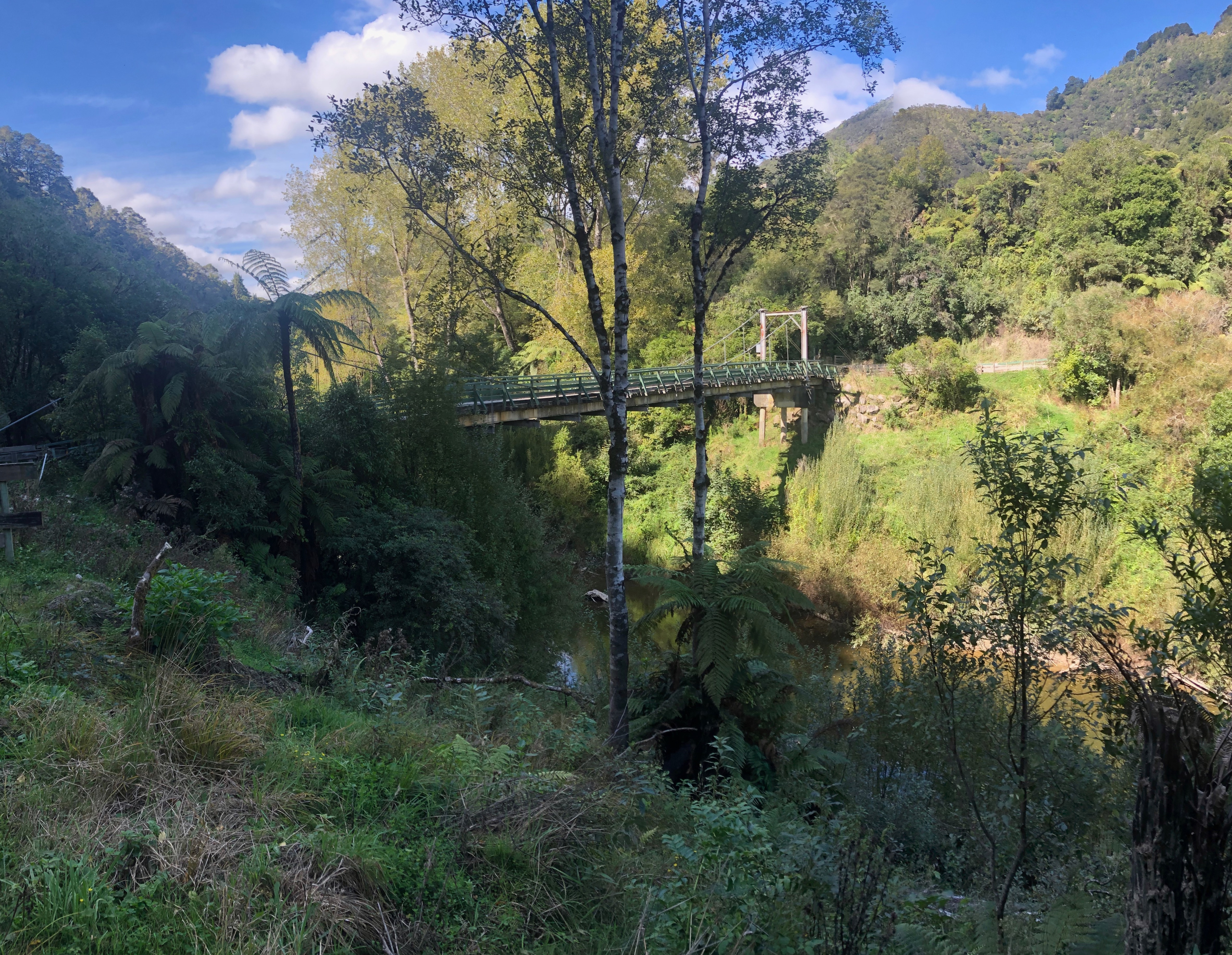
Whakahoro Bridge over Retaruke River from Te Rata Road, on the north bank, looking east

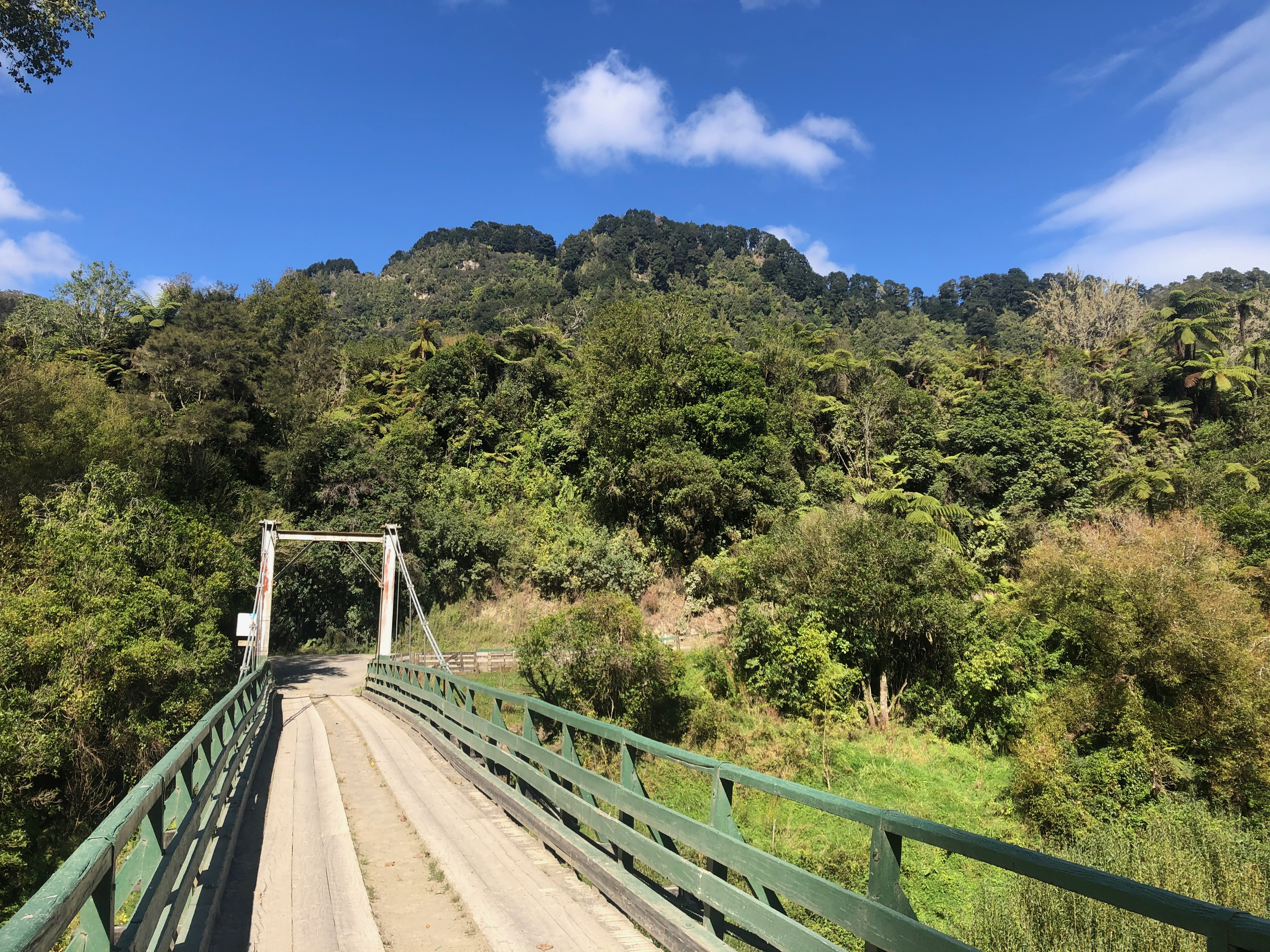
Whakahoro Bridge over Retaruke River

Historically, Whakahoro's Wade's Landing was a stopover point for riverboats steaming up and down the Whanganui River. The landing was located just below Whakahoro at the confluence with the Retaruke River. Work on it started in 1913 and it was in use by 1914. It was here that wool from the Retaruke valley's sheep farms was originally freighted to Wanganui for eventual export.

Improvements to navigation were gradually made. The first Hatrick launches reached the Retaruke in 1903. In 1908 work started on more improvements. A stone wall was built in 1920 to improve navigation on the river. At that time Whakaoro was the name used for the west bank and Whakatara for the east bank settlement.

Over the Whanganui River was the site of a Māori community. The land was subsequently leased to the Rusling family for sheep farming, but now has reverted to bush. The Roadway and Camp Road from here to the self-styled Republic of Whangamomona are no longer maintained.

Just above the confluence is the former Lacy's hotel, which is now a farm house. It had its own separate landing, tennis courts, and in the 1920s locals would meet for a friendly game of Rugby union in their hobnail boots.

From 1927 there was a river boat semi-permanently anchored at the junction. This river boat served alcohol beverages. As the King Country was a dry area, such beverages were actually banned; the boat was considered "offshore" from the King Country.

A township with 16 sections was mapped in 1929. Whakahoro had several streets, notably Lover's Lane and Dempsey Ave.

A school had been established by 1932. In 1933 the teacher married local farmer, Frank Lacy. The 1946 Whakahoro School building, still stands, and has been converted into a stop over hostel for down-river canoeists.

Lacy's Bridge crosses the Retaruke River at Whakahoro. This was built in 1932 to replace an earlier bridge built in 1915–16.

The houseboat caught fire in 1933.

== See also ==
- Te Rata Bridge
