= Retaruke River =

River in New Zealand

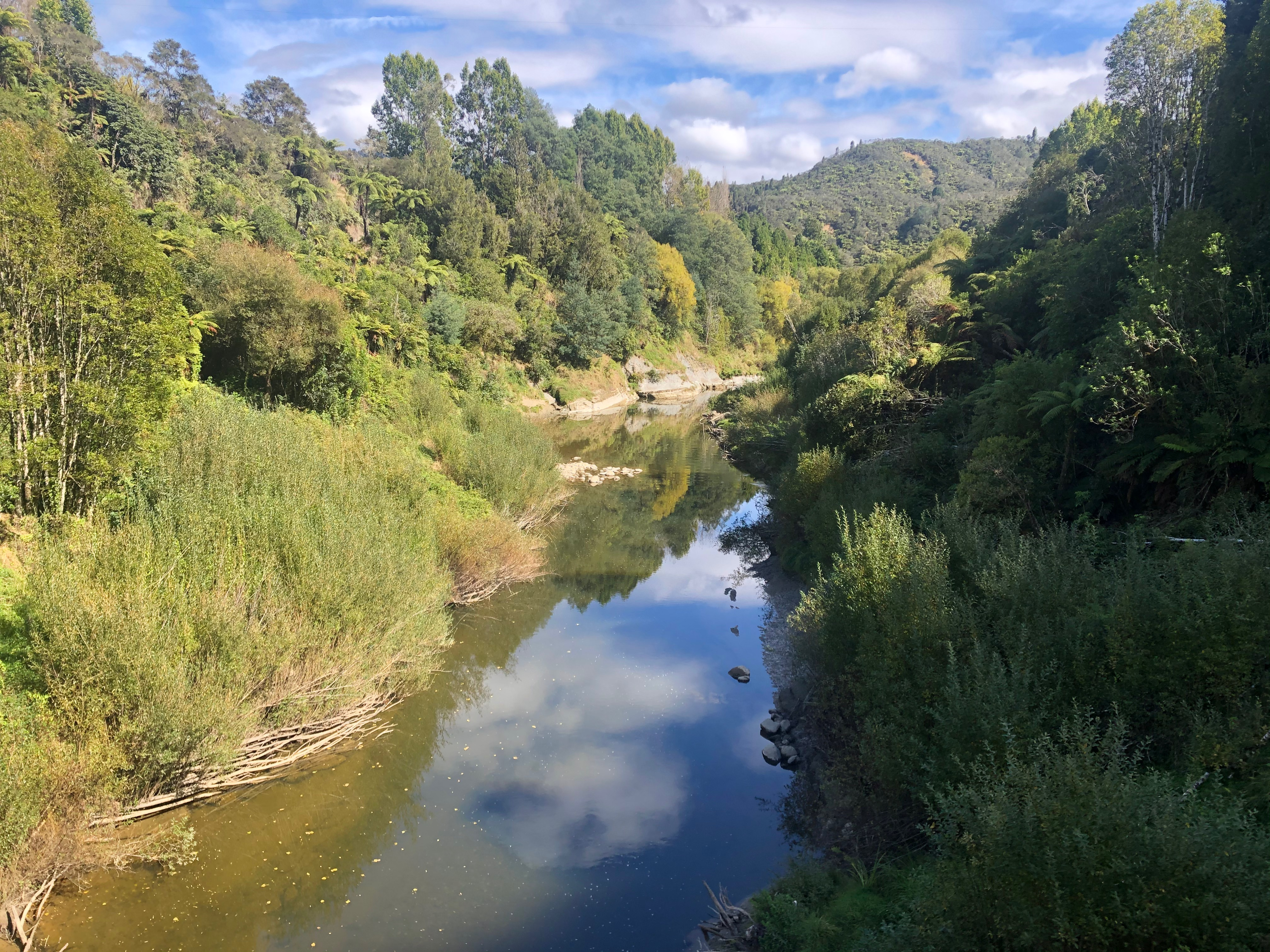
- The Retaruke River from Lacy's Bridge in Whakahoro
- Native name: Retaruke (Māori)

Location
- Country: New Zealand
- Region: Manawatū-Whanganui
- District: Ruapehu
- Settlements: Kaitieke, Whakahoro

Physical characteristics
- Source: Erua Forest
  - location: 2km south west of National Park
  - coordinates: 39°10′59″S 175°22′52″E
  - elevation: 870 m (2,850 ft)
- Mouth: Whanganui River
  - location: Whakahoro
  - coordinates: 39°6′29″S 175°4′12″E
  - elevation: 110 m (360 ft)
- Length: 64 km (40 mi)

Basin features
- Progression: Retaruke River → Whanganui River
- River system: Whanganui River
- Tributaries
  - left: Mangaopatuerua Stream, Tarata Stream, Taurimu Stream, Morinui Stream, Oruru Stream, Poururu Stream, Takapa Stream, Pukupuku Stream
  - right: Tupapakurua Stream, Kauhangaroa Stream, Kaitieke Stream, Kawautahi Stream, Makokomiko Stream, Mangaorakei Stream, Orupe Stream, Makoura Stream, Papapotu Stream, Omaruroa Stream, Tapuae Stream

The Retaruke River is a river in the North Island of New Zealand. It joins with the Whanganui River at Whakahoro just above Wade's Landing and downstream from Taumarunui. The river flows through the farming communities of Upper and then Lower Retaruke Valley. Downstream from this junction is the Mangapurua Landing with its Bridge to Nowhere, servicing the ill-fated Mangapurua Valley farming community.

== Sources ==
The river source is located 2 km (1.2 mi) south west of National Park in the Erua Forest. The river initially flows south west through the forest before bending to flow north west.

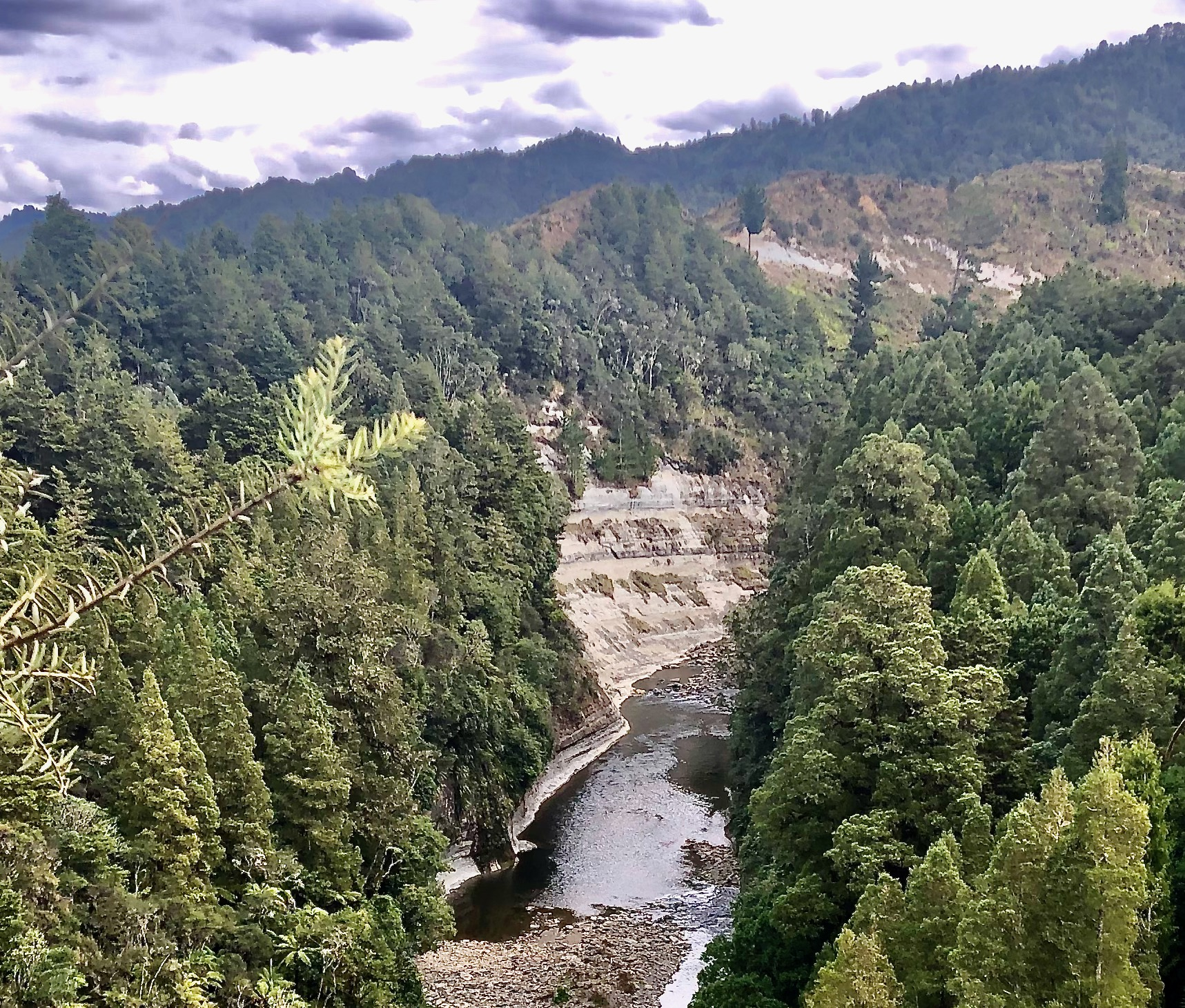
Retaruke River gorge at Ngamoturiki

== Geology ==
Most of the valley is made up of Early Miocene Mahoenui Group rocks. About 65,000 years ago movement of the Waimarino Fault probably allowed capture of the Waimarino Stream and/or Makatote River by the Manganuiateao River, which would have reduced erosion by ending the incidence of lahars and reducing flows in the Retaruke River.

Coal was discovered in 1909 in the Late Miocene Whangamomona Group. During the 1960s and 1970s, an opencast coal mine operated at the top end of Retaruke Road. Between 1938 and 1984 it produced about 3,000 tons of coal.

== Upper Retaruke valley community ==
1 kilometre up the Upper Retaruke Valley road is the location of the annual Kaitieke Collie club sheepdog trials. Next is the location of a "Victory Hall". Further up the valley there was a coal mine, and it was along the upper Retaruke river that fossil whalebones were found by Ken McNaught.

== Lower Retaruke valley community ==
Portions of the Lower Retaruke Valley were settled about 1900 by government run farm ballot. Other portions were independently purchased from the Māori community. The land was then cleared, grassed, and sheep flocks herded in from Raurimu to stock the hills.

The valley previously had a tiny Mangaroa Primary School(39°7.22′S 175°8.06′E). At a location further up there still remain the community hall and sports field, here there are annual children's Christmas parties, occasional Dances/Social and the annual Retaruke Easter Sports Day are run.

Access to the Valley is via three main roads: Oio Road, Kawautahi Road or the Raurimu-Kaitieke Road from Raurimu. However, on foot the valley can be accessed via the old Mangapurua Road, or by jetboat or via the Whanganui River. (Other access routes such as the Kokako Road & Kuotoroa East Road (to Ruatiti), Te Mata Road from Whakahoro to Taumarunui have long since been abandoned. Some of these roads were examples of pack horse tracks that were expanded to roads during the Great Depression 1930s as job creation schemes.)

Historically, the wealth of the valley has come from the production of wool. Early on there were also some small dairy farms producing cream/"butterfat" for the Kaitieke dairy factory that was located in Piriaka near Taumarunui.

== Reserves ==
The Retaruke valley has several scenic reserves. Hautonu 9 acres (3.6 ha), Papapotu 28 acres (11 ha), Ngataumata 7 acres (2.8 ha), Ngamoturiki 12 acres (4.9 ha) and Rotokahu 312 acres (126 ha) were gazetted in 1913 and Ngamoturiki 12.5857 ha (31.100 acres) in 1979. The original vegetation was mainly rimu, rāta, tawa, hīnau, rewarewa, hard beech, and kāmahi. Since about 1960, many kāmahi around the headwaters of the river have died. The highest and steepest hills in the Retaruke catchment have residual tawa-dominated stands or secondary growth of kāmahi and some kānuka and rewarewa. The rest of the valley was largely converted from native bush to pasture in about 40 years from the 1880s.

== Tributaries ==
| Tributary Name | Length (km) | km From Mouth | Confluence Coordinates | Altitude |
|---|---|---|---|---|
| Near Erua Road | River source | | 39°15.60′S 175°20.58′E |
| | | | 39°05.31′S 175°14.66′E |
| Kawautahi Stream | | | 39°04.22′S 175°13.11′E |
| Whanganui River | River Mouth | 0 km | 39°06.65′S 175°03.98′E |

== Climate ==
Climate data for Lower Retaruke (1991–2020 normals, extremes 1966–present)
| Month | Jan | Feb | Mar | Apr | May | Jun | Jul | Aug | Sep | Oct | Nov | Dec | Year |
|---|---|---|---|---|---|---|---|---|---|---|---|---|---|
| Record high °C (°F) | 31.5 (88.7) | 33.1 (91.6) | 30.2 (86.4) | 26.1 (79.0) | 23.2 (73.8) | 20.6 (69.1) | 19.6 (67.3) | 21.7 (71.1) | 25.2 (77.4) | 26.1 (79.0) | 29.5 (85.1) | 32.3 (90.1) | 33.1 (91.6) |
| Mean maximum °C (°F) | 28.4 (83.1) | 28.7 (83.7) | 26.5 (79.7) | 23.0 (73.4) | 19.8 (67.6) | 17.0 (62.6) | 15.9 (60.6) | 16.9 (62.4) | 19.5 (67.1) | 22.0 (71.6) | 24.0 (75.2) | 26.6 (79.9) | 30.0 (86.0) |
| Mean daily maximum °C (°F) | 24.0 (75.2) | 24.3 (75.7) | 22.0 (71.6) | 18.6 (65.5) | 15.6 (60.1) | 12.9 (55.2) | 12.6 (54.7) | 13.4 (56.1) | 15.3 (59.5) | 17.1 (62.8) | 19.4 (66.9) | 21.8 (71.2) | 18.1 (64.5) |
| Daily mean °C (°F) | 17.7 (63.9) | 18.0 (64.4) | 15.7 (60.3) | 13.1 (55.6) | 10.5 (50.9) | 8.2 (46.8) | 7.6 (45.7) | 8.4 (47.1) | 10.3 (50.5) | 12.1 (53.8) | 13.7 (56.7) | 16.3 (61.3) | 12.6 (54.8) |
| Mean daily minimum °C (°F) | 11.5 (52.7) | 11.7 (53.1) | 9.4 (48.9) | 7.5 (45.5) | 5.4 (41.7) | 3.6 (38.5) | 2.7 (36.9) | 3.5 (38.3) | 5.4 (41.7) | 7.0 (44.6) | 8.1 (46.6) | 10.8 (51.4) | 7.2 (45.0) |
| Mean minimum °C (°F) | 4.3 (39.7) | 4.7 (40.5) | 2.2 (36.0) | 0.0 (32.0) | −1.4 (29.5) | −3.1 (26.4) | −3.9 (25.0) | −2.9 (26.8) | −1.6 (29.1) | −0.4 (31.3) | 1.0 (33.8) | 3.8 (38.8) | −4.4 (24.1) |
| Record low °C (°F) | 0.3 (32.5) | 0.2 (32.4) | −2.0 (28.4) | −3.2 (26.2) | −4.6 (23.7) | −6.4 (20.5) | −6.5 (20.3) | −5.3 (22.5) | −4.2 (24.4) | −3.3 (26.1) | −1.0 (30.2) | 0.3 (32.5) | −6.5 (20.3) |
| Average rainfall mm (inches) | 93.6 (3.69) | 99.4 (3.91) | 88.2 (3.47) | 123.4 (4.86) | 133.7 (5.26) | 137.7 (5.42) | 153.7 (6.05) | 162.4 (6.39) | 154.9 (6.10) | 145.0 (5.71) | 126.2 (4.97) | 145.9 (5.74) | 1,564.1 (61.57) |
Source: NIWA
