= Taumarunui High School =

Location
- 202 Golf Road; Taumarunui 3920; New Zealand; 38.8639°S 175.2480°E

Information
- Type: State, Co-Ed Secondary (Year 9–13), Boarding Facilities
- Motto: Kia Manawanui "Be Steadfast"
- Ministry of Education Institution no.: 169
- Principal: John Rautenbach
- Enrolment: 300 (July 2026)
- Colours: Blue and Gold
- Socio-economic decile: 2E
- Website: www.nuihigh.com

Taumarunui High School is a state coeducational secondary school located in Taumarunui, New Zealand. There are approximately 300 students.

The school was originally located in the township.

The school's colours are navy blue and gold.

== Enrolment ==
As of July 2026, Taumarunui High School has a roll of 300 students, of which 213 (71.0%) identify as Māori.

As of 2026, the school has an Equity Index of 528, placing it amongst schools whose students have the most socioeconomic barriers to achievement (roughly equivalent to deciles 1 and 2 under the former socio-economic decile system).

== Notable alumni ==
- Prof. James L. Beck – Professor of Engineering and Applied Science, California Institute of Technology.
- Prof. John C. Butcher ONZM – Honorary Research Professor, Dept. of Mathematics, University of Auckland.
- Ben Fouhy, world champion kayaker.
- Marc and Todd Hunter from the band Dragon.
- Ivan Mercep, 2008 recipient of the New Zealand Institute of Architects Gold Medal.
- Jenny Ludlam – actress.

== See also ==
- List of schools in New Zealand
