= Timothy J. Sinclair =

New Zealand academic (1963–2022)

Timothy Sinclair was a political scientist who wrote extensively on the politics of global finance. He was an expert on the major American credit rating agencies, Moody's Investors Service, Standard & Poor and Fitch.

Sinclair was born in Taumarunui, New Zealand in 1963, and was educated at Taumarunui Primary School, and at St. Andrew's College and the University of Canterbury in Christchurch. In 1988 and 1989 he worked as a trainee analyst at the New Zealand Treasury in Wellington. Sinclair completed his Ph.D. at York University in Toronto and joined the University of Warwick in 1995. He has been a visiting scholar at Harvard University, the University of York and the University of Sheffield.

Timothy authored "To the Brink of Destruction: America's Rating Agencies and Financial Crisis" in 2021.

Timothy died in 2022.
