= Bridges in New Zealand =

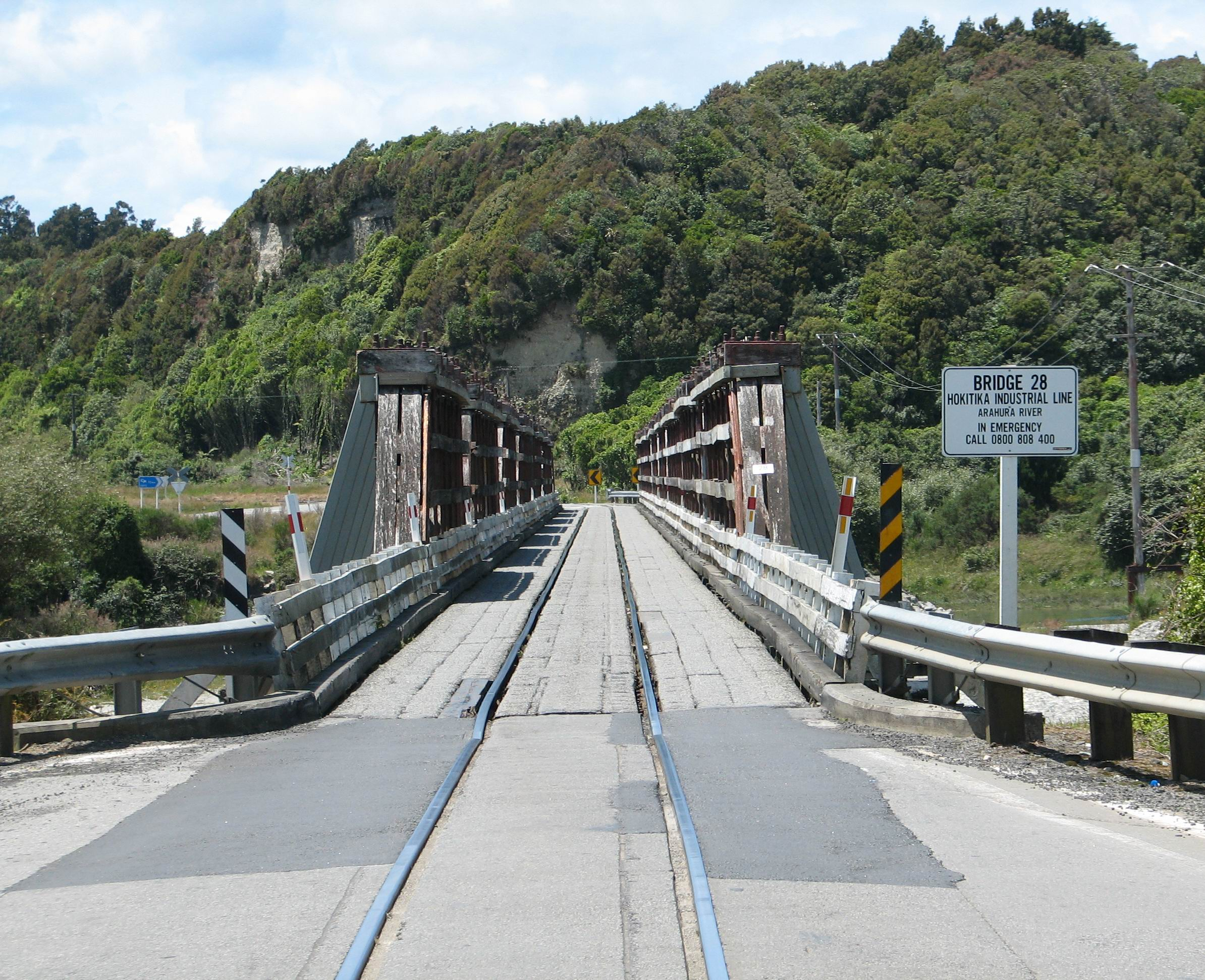
The historic Arahura River road/rail bridge on the West Coast of the South Island. It was replaced with a new bridge with separate road and rail sections in 2009.

Bridges in New Zealand date back to the early European settlement of the mid-19th century.

== Road bridges ==
In 2011 there were 4,024 bridges on State Highways, with a total length of 142 km (88 mi) (1.3% of SH length). There were 13,726 bridges covering 232 km (144 mi) in urban areas, also forming 1.3% of their length. 7,567 of them were single lane bridges. The 120 bridges on special-purpose roads formed only 3.7 km (2.3 mi), or 0.7% of their length. The carbon footprint of the bridges was estimated to be 37.5 times that of their roads.

Some of the longest bridges on the state highway network are:

- Rakaia River bridge – 1,757 m (5,764 ft)
- Auckland Harbour Bridge – 1,020 m (3,350 ft)
- Thorndon Overbridges – 1,335 m (4,380 ft)
- Whirokino Trestle Bridge – 1,098 m (3,602 ft)
- Waitaki River Bridge – 906 m (2,972 ft)
- Hokitika River Bridge – 740 m (2,430 ft)
- Haast River Bridge – 737 m (2,418 ft)

=== Single lane bridges ===
New Zealand, due to its low traffic density, has had many single lane bridges. Some of those still exist on the state highway network and are criticised by road users. These are progressively replaced with two lane structures. The oldest and one of the longest single lane bridge on the state highway network until December 2011 was the 463-metre (1,519 ft) Kopu Bridge spanning the Waihou River. It was replaced by a 580-metre (1,900 ft), two-lane structure, which opened to traffic on 12 December 2011.

== Viaducts ==
- Newmarket Viaduct
- Otira Viaduct
- Percy Burn Viaduct
- Victoria Park Viaduct
- Mohaka Viaduct

== Rail bridges ==
There are 1,787 bridges on the rail network in New Zealand which are maintained by KiwiRail, the infrastructure arm of the New Zealand Railways Corporation, though a 2011 study said there were 1,636 bridges, with a total length of 63.8 km (39.6 mi).

== Road/rail bridges ==
Historically many bridges were combined road and rail bridges. Some were “double-decker” with the rail track above the roadway. e.g. the Awatere River bridge north of Seddon in Marlborough, and Okahukura in the King Country. Most were one (road) lane wide. Many had combined decks particularly in areas with low traffic, so drivers had to navigate over raised rail tracks. In 2004 there were five left; two on the heritage Otago Central Railway. Two were at Arahura and Taramakau between Greymouth and Hokitika. on the West Coast, where the line had only two trains a day. Several former bridges were in Canterbury, over wide braided rivers; e.g. over the Rakaia River (at 1.75 km the longest bridge on the network), the Rangitaka River and on the boundary with Otago the Waitaki River (opened 1876) . They all lasted into the 20th century; the last to be replaced was the Waitaki River bridge (opened 1876), where a new road bridge was opened in 1956, and new rail bridge shortly afterwards.The busy Waitaki River bridge on the South Island Main Trunk had two lanes, and “bridge keepers” closed the road bridge gates to the bridge when in use by trains. There are two bridges on the State Highway on West Coast that have rail lines on the road carriageway. Until 2008 the Awatere River bridge had a rail line above the road way. A new road bridge was constructed with the railway now being the sole use of the original bridge. A combined bridge was at Pekatahi, between Edgecumbe and Taneatua in the Bay of Plenty (the rail line in 2004 was unused, but not closed).

Two bridges on now-closed sections of the East Coast Main Trunk line are still in use by road-traffic only. The single deck Pekatahi Bridge, which spans the Whakatāne River near Taneatua carries State Highway Two and it used to carry the mothballed rails of the ECMT the tracks were removed in 2019. The rare double-deck road-rail bridge at Karangahake Gorge, which crosses the Ohinemuri River, still carries a local road on the lower level, whilst on the upper level, the railway has been replaced by a walkway.

== Footbridges ==
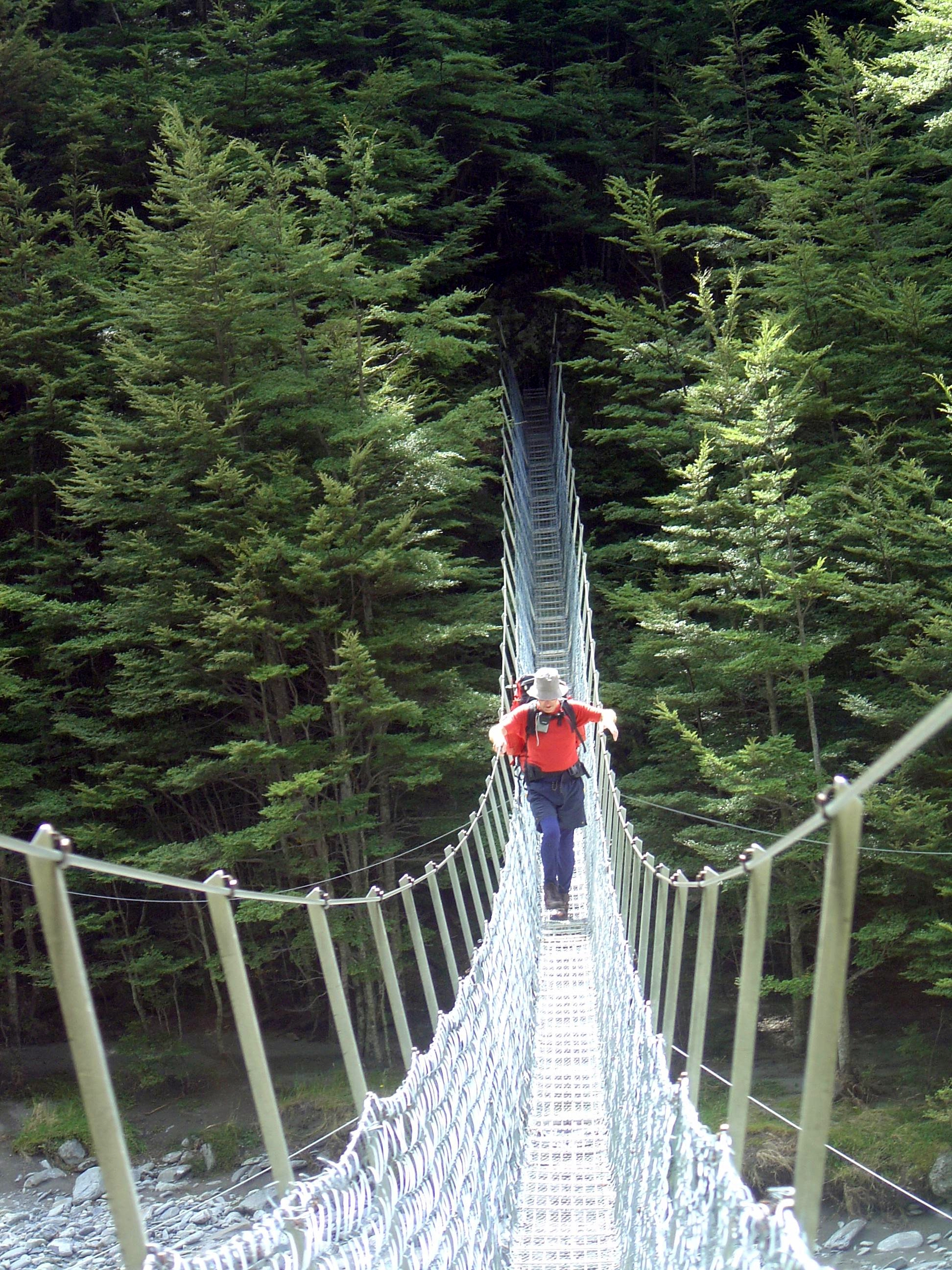
A tramper crossing a swingbridge over a remote river in the South Island.

Since there are numerous large rivers in New Zealand many footbridges have been constructed in the backcountry. During the 1950s many bridges were built, along with backcountry huts, to give hunters access to forested areas to cull introduced deer which had by that stage become a serious pest. Some of the bridges still remain but other have been washed away or replaced with new ones and are now often used due to the popularity of tramping (hiking).

== Notable bridges ==
- The Auckland Harbour Bridge spans the Waitemata Harbour in the largest city in New Zealand.
- The Bridge to Nowhere is a concrete road bridge spanning the Mangapurua Stream in Whanganui National Park. It has no roads leading to it, but it is a popular tourist attraction, accessible by boat or kayak. It was built in a failed attempt to open up a remote forested area for farming.

== Incidents ==
=== Glen Afton rail bridge bombing ===
On April 30, during the 1951 New Zealand waterfront dispute, a rail bridge on the Glen Afton branch line, three miles from Huntly, was sabotaged and damaged with explosives. The morning passenger train ran over the damaged bridge safely, without it collapsing. After regular railway line patrols were commenced, trains ran normally again the next day.

=== Tangiwai disaster ===
The Tangiwai disaster on 24 December 1953, was the worst rail accident in New Zealand. The rail bridge over the Whangaehu river at Tangiwai had been badly damaged by a lahar from Mount Ruapehu just minutes before a passenger train was due to cross it. Of the 285 passengers, 151 died.

=== Berrymans' bridge ===
In 1986 the New Zealand Army built the Te Rata Bridge as a training exercise on a private farm owned by the Berryman family. In 1994 a beekeeper visiting the farm was killed when the bridge collapsed as he drove over it. The incident led to a series of high-profile court cases.

=== Destruction in storms ===
Numerous bridges have been destroyed by floodwaters in storms, including the Waiho Bridge near Franz Josef Glacier in 2019.

== See also ==
- Transport in New Zealand
