= Charles Croft Marsack =

English war veteran (1892–1987)

Charles Croft Marsack OBE
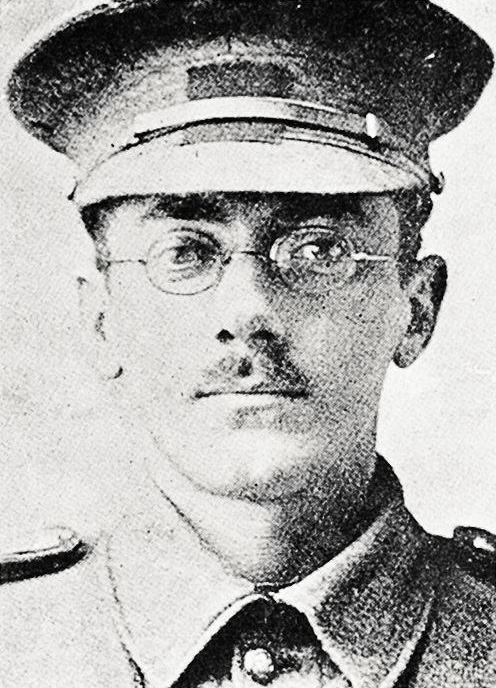
- Charles in WWI

Mayor of Taumarunui
- In office 1923–1925
- Preceded by: G.S. Steadman
- Succeeded by: G.E. Manson

Personal details
- Born: 7 May 1892 Auckland, New Zealand
- Died: 3 October 1987 (aged 95)
- Spouse: Ninette Padiou (m. 1918)
- Children: 2
- Parents: Mary Ann Marsack (mother); Richard Marsack (father)
- Education: Auckland Grammar School
- Alma mater: University of Auckland

Military service
- Years of service: 1915–1948
- Rank: 2nd Lieutenant

Charles Croft Marsack OBE (7 May 1892 – 3 October 1987) was an English war veteran. He was the mayor of the town of Taumarunui from 1923 until 1925. He published two books Teach Yourself Samoan and Samoan Medley. Later in his life, he was a jurist in Samoa and Fiji.

== Early life ==
Charles Croft Marsack was born on 7 May 1892 in Auckland, New Zealand. He was the second son of Mary Ann Marsack and Richard Marsack, and was one of the four children in his family. Marsack attended Auckland Grammar School, and later University of Auckland, where he got a degree in law.

== Military career ==
Marsack first enlisted on 28 April 1915. He set sail to Suez, Egypt, on 9 October 1915, and arrived on 22 November 1915. He was on the same Brigade as his brother. He was eventually promoted to the 2nd Lieutenant where he worked on sending units to the battlefield.

Marsack eventually returned home. He travelled to London where he met and married a French woman named Ninette Padiou in 1918. They later had 2 children.

Marsack went back to serve in WWII. He was then promoted major in 1940, which then led him to being promoted to Lieutenant Colonel. He was then Mentioned in Despatches within The London Gazette in 1940. He served in Egypt and was there based on the Maadi Camp.

=== Political career ===
Marsack became the mayor of Taumarunui in 1923, until the end of his term ended in 1925.

== Personal life ==
After WWII, Marsack went on to have a Civil career. During this time, he was The Chief Justice of Samoa, along with being The Judge of the Fiji Court of Appeal. In 1962, he was appointed as an officer of the Order of the British Empire, which was given to him by Elizabeth II during her visit in Fiji. He later published two books, along with his diaries for his service in WWII.

He died on 3 October 1987.
