= List of Cosmopolitan Clubs =

The following is a list of Cosmopolitan Clubs grouped by continent and geographic region. The Cosmopolitan Club is a private social club with groups located in approximately every corner of the world.

== North America ==
Canada

- Cosmopolitan Club (Winnipeg), service club with special emphasis on supporting efforts to prevent and find a cure for diabetes

United States

In the United States the Cosmopolitan Club movement began in the University of Wisconsin in 1903.

- Bath Cosmopolitan Club (Maine): Established 1913;
- Illinois Cosmopolitan Club: Established 1907;
- Cosmopolitan Club (New York): The New York women's private club. Established 1909;
- Cosmopolitan Club of Philadelphia: Established 1928;

== Asia ==
=== China ===
- Shanghai Cosmopolitan Club;

=== India ===
- Bombay Cosmopolitan Club: Established 1891;
- The Cosmopolitan Club (Chennai): is one of the three 18-hole golf courses in Chennai, India. Established: 1873;
- The Cosmopolitan Club (Coimbatore), founded 1891;
- The Cocanada Cosmopolitan Club (Kakinada), founded 1918

== Europe ==
=== United Kingdom ===
- Dosthill Cosmopolitan Club (Staffordshire);
- London, Cosmopolitan Club (London), active 1852-1902, members included M. E. Grant Duff

== Oceania ==
=== Australia ===
- Innisfail Cosmopolitan Club: Destroyed by a bomb Saturday 28 May 1932 (cf. The Canberra Times);

=== New Zealand ===
- Hamilton Cosmopolitan Club: Established 1964
- Levin Cosmopolitan Club: Establishes when some local gentleman were not permitted to play darts at a local hotel, Established: 1901
- Masterton Cosmopolitan Club: Established 1973;
- Napier Cosmopolitan Club: Established 1877, Chartered 1881;
- Upper Hutt Cosmopolitan Club: Established 1961;
- Wanganui Cosmopolitan Club: Established 1901;

Also: Taumarunui, Taupō and Tokoroa;
