= Te Rata Bridge =

- Coordinates: 39°6.78′S 175°5.76′E
- Carried: Single lane traffic
- Crossed: Retaruke River
- Locale: King Country, New Zealand

Characteristics
- Design: Suspension bridge
- Clearance below: 30 m (98 ft)

History
- Constructed by: New Zealand Army
- Opened: 1986
- Collapsed: 22 March 1994
- Replaced: Hayes bridge

Location
- Interactive map of Te Rata Bridge

The Te Rata Bridge was a suspension bridge across the Retaruke River in the King Country, New Zealand. On 22 March 1994 two transoms (the supporting beams suspended from wire ropes running from side to side beneath the bridge) snapped causing the bridge to collapse while beekeeper Kenneth Richards was crossing in a laden light truck. Richards was killed when the truck fell 30 metres into the river.

== History ==
=== Construction ===
The bridge was built on public land in 1986 for Keith and Margaret Berryman, a nearby landowner, by members of the New Zealand Army and a group of Fijian army trainees, as an exercise. The design was based upon calculations by Lieutenant John Armstrong, with labour and logistics for construction provided at New Zealand Army expense.

The Berrymans were to provide all materials, but instead of the specified macrocarpa or tanalised radiata pine timber for the transoms and bearers, they obtained Douglas fir timber from a demolition site in Wanganui. Lieutenant Armstrong's initial reaction was not to proceed with construction using deficient materials, but he was eventually persuaded when Keith Berryman signed a statement, witnessed by a neighbouring JP, taking responsibility for the materials and their subsequent inspection and maintenance. Loading was recalculated accordingly. Untreated Douglas fir timber has featured in the leaky homes saga around New Zealand; it is difficult to treat against decay and untreated timber is suitable for use only where it can be adequately protected from moisture. Te Rata receives about 1800 mm (72 in) of rainfall per year, and the river gorge is continuously damp with frequent fog.

=== Collapse ===
G. W. Butcher, a retired Lieutenant Colonel and civil engineer, who reported on the collapse for the army, concluded that the failure was caused by "50% reduction in the nominal strength of the member ... entirely due to decay of the untreated timber." Additional factors were "the decision to use two 300x75 beams bolted together for the transoms in place of a solid 300x150 member" and the lack of a "regular inspection and maintenance programme [...] by the owners of the bridge". The army withheld Butcher's report from the 1997 inquest into Richards' death and kept its contents secret until it was published illegally on the internet by the Berrymans' lawyer, Rob Moodie. The Berrymans claim that their fight against attempts by the Occupational Safety and Health department to prosecute them for Richards' death has led to bankruptcy and the loss of their farm.

The complete text of the Butcher report is held at Wikisource:Butcher report. Its author could not previously comment publicly on its implications, but since its illegal distribution the Army has released the report. George Butcher has now spoken publicly and said Keith Berryman admitted to him that the transoms were in poor condition, that there was visible rot in some timbers, and that he was worried about the state of the bridge. Knowledge of an unsafe work environment and failure to prevent or isolate the risk is an offence in New Zealand, but the prosecution of the Berrymans failed when the judge ruled the bridge did not meet the definition of Mr Richards' place of work in the Health and Safety in Employment Act 1992.

=== Timeline of Te Rata bridges ===
The Berryman Bridge was the second suspension bridge to be the primary access to Te Rata. The earlier bridge, which collapsed around the 1980s, was a fearsome structure on the same site. In the 'Otago Born and Bred' articles noted below, this first bridge is referred to as the Hayes Bridge. The Hayes bridge, said to be 100 ft above the water, is understood by the Ruslings, still resident in the valley, to have been built by the Tichner brothers, formerly sailors, around 1915–1916. The cables consisted of bunches of 52 strands of No. 8 wire, and endured the whole life of the bridge, a period of at least 66 years. When the bridge finally collapsed under the weight of a mob of sheep, the uprights on the house side gave way, allowing the anchors to fall away. Evan and Bob Hayes, who were moving the sheep, were fortunately not on the bridge when it collapsed, but most of the sheep were either killed from the fall, or drowned in the Retaruke.

- 1915–1916 Original bridge "Hayes bridge" constructed.
- 1986 – Second bridge constructed.
- 1994 – Bridge collapses.
- 1997 – Inquest into collapse.
- 2008, May – High Court quashes the parts of the 1997 finding by Taumarunui coroner that exonerated the Army, but stops short of exonerating the Berrymans
- 2008, June – Berrymans seek damages from Defence Force at the Court of Appeal
- 2008, 25 September – Court of Appeal decided Berryman's will have their claim of misfeasance heard.
- 2009, 24 December – Berrymans accept Government settlement offer of $150,000.

== See also ==
- Bridges in New Zealand
