= Lindsay Crocker =

New Zealand cricketer (1958–2023)

Personal information
- Full name: Lindsay Mervyn Crocker
- Born: 16 May 1958; Taumarunui, New Zealand
- Died: 7 May 2023 (aged 64); Auckland, New Zealand
- Batting: Right-handed
- Role: Batsman, occasional wicket-keeper

Domestic team information
- Years: Team
- 1982/83–1988/89: Northern Districts

Career statistics
Competition	First-class	List A
Matches	54	34
Runs scored	2,663	633
Batting average	27.45	18.61
100s/50s	2/14	0/2
Top score	126	74
Catches/stumpings	40/1	7/0
- Source: Cricinfo, 28 August 2024

Lindsay Mervyn Crocker (16 May 1958 – 7 May 2023) was a New Zealand cricketer who played 54 first-class matches for Northern Districts in the 1980s.

Crocker scored 2,663 runs at an average of 27.45 for Northern Districts as an opening batsman. He had his most successful season in 1983–84, when he scored 588 runs at an average of 34.58, and made his highest score of 126. After the season, he was selected to tour Zimbabwe in the Young New Zealand team in October 1984, but he had to withdraw before the tour after breaking his wrist.

After his retirement, Crocker involved himself in administration. He was Auckland's chief executive for seven years and managed the national team. Crocker died on 7 May 2023, at the age of 64.
