= Ben Fouhy =

New Zealand canoeist (born 1979)

Medal record

Representing New Zealand

Men's canoe sprint

Olympic Games
Silver medal – second place	2004 Athens	K-1 1000 m

World Championships
Gold medal – first place	2003 Gainesville	K-1 1000 m
Bronze medal – third place	2006 Szeged	K-1 1000 m

Men's canoe marathon

Canoe Marathon World Championships
Bronze medal – third place	2005 Perth	K-1 marathon

Ben Fouhy (born 4 March 1979, in Taumarunui) is a New Zealand flatwater and marathon canoeist who has been competing since the early 2000s. He competed in three Summer Olympics, winning a silver medal in the K-1 1000 m event at Athens in 2004. He also finished fourth in the 2008 Olympics and ninth in the 2012 Olympics in the same event. He is the recipient of the 2003 Halberg Award for NZ Sportsman of the Year and is a former world record holder in the K1 1000m event.

== Career history ==
Fouhy began kayaking competitively in 2002, following a background in multi-sport events. He discovered an aptitude for paddling after increasing his kayak training to improve his overall multisport performance.

After a handful of domestic wins Fouhy, an unknown on the international field at the time, took a surprise gold medal at the ICF Canoe Sprint World Championships in Gainesville, Georgia, USA. Following this achievement, he won several Sportsperson of the Year titles, including the coveted Halberg Award.

The following year, at the 2004 Athens Olympics, Fouhy achieved New Zealand’s first medal in Kayaking since the 1980s.

In 2005, Fouhy was made a Member of the New Zealand Order of Merit (MNZM).

== Career highlights ==
- Gold Medal in K1 1000m – 2003 World Cup regatta Poznan, Poland
- Gold Medal in K1 1000m & K1 500m – 2005 Australian National Championships, Sydney
- Halberg Award – 2003 New Zealand Sportsman of the Year
- Bronze Medal in K1 marathon – 2005 World Marathon Championships, Perth
- Gold Medal in K1 1000m – 2004 English National Championships, Nottingham
- Olympic Silver Medal in K1 1000m – 2004 Athens Olympics
- Bronze Medal in K1 1000m – 2006 World Championships, Szeged, Hungary
- Gold Medal in K2 1000m – 2004 NZ Sprint National Championships, Auckland
- World Champion K1 1000m – 2003 World Championships, Gainesville, Georgia, U.S.
- Gold Medal in K1 1000m – 2004 NZ Sprint National Championships, Auckland
- Gold Medal, Worlds fastest time in K1 1000m – 2006 World Cup regatta, Poland
- Gold Medal in K1 1000m – 2003 NZ Sprint National Championships, Auckland

Awards
Preceded by Craig Perks	New Zealand's Sportsman of the Year; 2003	Succeeded by Hamish Carter
