= Piriaka Power Station =

- Location within New Zealand
- Country: New Zealand
- Location: Manawatū-Whanganui
- Coordinates: 38°55′3.0″S 175°20′26.9″E (For the weir)
- Purpose: Power
- Status: Operational
- Construction began: 1922
- Opening date: 21 March 1924
- Owners: Taumarunui Borough Council (1924–1989); King Country Electric Power Board (1989–1993); King Country Energy (1993– )
- Operator: King Country Energy

Dam and spillways
- Type of dam: Weir
- Impounds: Whanganui River
- Height (foundation): 1 metre

Piriaka Power Station
- Coordinates: 38°54′41.9″S 175°20′35.2″E
- Operator: King Country Energy
- Commission date: 1924
- Type: Run of the River
- Hydraulic head: 8.2 metres
- Turbines: Three
- Installed capacity: 1.3 MW (1,700 hp)
- Annual generation: 7 GWh (25 TJ)
- Website; Piriaka Power Station

The Piriaka power station is a hydroelectric power facility in Manawatū-Whanganui in New Zealand which draws water from behind a weir on the Whanganui River near Piriaka and diverts it through a canal and penstock to the Piriaka Power Station, which is located approximately 9 km (6 miles) southeast of the town of Taumarunui, via SH4. The power station discharges back into the Whanganui River.

== History ==
=== Development ===
Since 1914 the borough of Taumarunui had had a gas plant supplied by the Dreadnought Gas Co. which supplied the town with gas for lighting and cooking but by 1917 the system was beginning to deteriorate.

The passing of the Electric Power Boards Act in 1918 which allowed local authorities to generate and distribute electricity assisted in converting Andrew S. Laird, who had been the mayor of Taumarunui since 1917 into an enthusiastic proponent of electricity generation. While the Taumarunui borough council had intended to wait until after the First World War had finished before pursuing the matter further, Laird was able to convince the council to follow the lead of others in the region such as Ohakune, Raetihi and Te Kuiti in building its own hydroelectric power scheme. As a result, W. J. Gibbs the engineer of the Te Aroha Borough Council was engaged to investigate possible options. However, nothing appears to have resulted from his endeavours. Then in early 1919, the council asked the Minister of Internal Affairs to request Lawrence Birks, the senior electrical engineer in the Public Works Department (PWD) to assess the hydroelectric potential of the Taumarunui area. The government declined the request and suggested that the council employ a private consulting engineer.

Laird became even more supportive of a scheme after while attending a conference of local bodies in Hamilton in February 1919 to consider the development of hydro-electric power in the Auckland region and visiting the Horohara power station. The borough council polled its ratepayers for approval to raise loan to build a power scheme but the motion was defeated by 118 to 80.

Three months later as a result of losing the April 1919 elections Laird was replaced by former mayor, George Steadman and the idea of a power scheme was dropped.

By 1920 despite there being 71 local electrical supply authorities throughout New Zealand. Taumarunui had no electrical supply despite the Public Works Department pointing out that there was potentially a demand of 2,000 hp from combined population of the 9,667 in Taumarunui and the surrounding region, which was more than enough to justify the establishment of an electrical supply authority.

With the reliability of their gas supply system continuing to deteriorate (for instance by January 1919 it was leaking 25,000 to 30,000 cubic feet of gas per month), the borough council decided to investigate the options for switching to electricity. On 5 August 1920 applications (which closed on 6 September 1920) were called for from electrical engineers to undertake the necessary investigations and to provide an estimate of the required cost of a scheme. From the 16 applications the Wellington-based consulting engineers Hay & Vickerman won the contract, with a fee of £100 subsequently being agreed for their preliminary work.

The borough council formally received Hay & Vickerman's report on 18 November 1920. Hay & Vickerman offered four possible hydro-electric power and lighting schemes. The council adopted the engineer's recommended Wanganui River Number 1 proposal, which they estimated would cost £44,000.

Due to the undeveloped and sparsely populated state of the rural area surrounding Hay & Vickerman recommended against establishing a power board.

After the Wanganui River Trust consented to borough council's proposed power scheme, the Whanganui River or Wanganui River as it was then called, Hay & Vickerman applied on behalf of their client for a water power licence, which was granted on 21 February 1924. This licence also granted the borough council the right to distribute electricity with the borough, the town of Manauni, part of Kaitieke County along the sides of the Whanganui River for a mile either side from Kakahi down to the junction of the Onagare and Whanganui Rivers.

A poll of Taumarunui ratepayers in April 1921 by 230 votes to five approved the raising of a loan to pay for the power scheme. Despite having remit over such a large area the borough council followed Hay & Vickerman advice and refused the urgings of the government and local Chamber of Commerce to become a power board. As a result, Piriaka's installed capacity was only sufficient to supply the Taumarunui load. As a result, even the town of Manauni though which the transmission passed from Piriaka to Taumarunui was not allowed to take a supply from the line. Manauni's situation was only rectified in 1928.

An economic slump due to the collapse in export prices for New Zealand's meat and wool exports made obtaining financing difficult. It took seven attempts between May 1921 and June 1922 before in that month a Wellington insurance company agreed to finance the project at an interest rate of 6%.

With the loan approved the borough council on 18 July 1922 established a committee to oversee the work and obtain the land required for the power scheme.

While agreeing to differ payment until a loan was obtained, Hay & Vickerman had continued with a detailed design of the scheme. This allowed construction work to quickly commence following the granting of the loan. One problem that the borough council had was that Cyril Smith the owner of land where it was proposed that the power station was to be located objected to a surveyor coming onto his land to survey the route of the penstock and take bore samples Even after the borough council advised him that the 1908 Public Works Act allowed them to go into his land, he still refused entry. The borough council, therefore, took him to court and received a ruling from the local magistrate on 8 August 1922 that he could not refuse access and had to pay all legal costs. Eventually, Smith and the borough council entered into negotiations, which resulted in it purchasing 15 acres of Smith's land for £450.

Orders for equipment were placed in February 1923 to Boving & Co Ltd for turbines and governors (£1,905), National Electrical & Engineering for General Electric generators and exciters (£2,352) and British Thomson Houston switchgear and power cabling (£2,244).

=== Construction ===
An access road was built to the construction site, where a simple construction camp of four two-man huts together with a workshop and a building to store equipment was established. The workers paid rent of two shillings a week to stay in a hut. Others lived in tents. Construction began on the headworks, canal, penstock and power house and the distribution network under the supervision of construction engineer H. Langdon.

As an indication of how many men were employed to build the power station an average of 21.5 men were employed on-site during February 1923.

On 14 March 1924, with electricity from Piriaka becoming available the council decided that the gas works should be shut down by the end of the month. By this time there were only 49 customers receiving a gas supply.

As work continued on the power station the first customers were being signed up, transmission lines were being constructed, street lighting installed and buildings wired to accept electricity. By January 1925 approximately 210 buildings had been wired.

From the power station a 3.3 kV overhead transmission line using No.8 wire was built to supply the village of Piriaka while a second 3.3 kV line was built using7/14 wire via Manunui to Taumarunui.

=== Commissioning ===
By February 1924 construction had reached the point that commissioning tests could be undertaken. By 4 March 1926, the testing had been completed allowing the main street of Taumarunui to be lit by 22 lamps, while 80 smaller lamps were energized in other streets. The business area shops were lit up with a total of 54 consumers receiving a supply.

The power station was commissioned with two Boving & Co 300 hp vertical Francis turbines which were each directly coupled to a General Electric 250 KVA, 212 kW generator to give a total station output of 425 kW at 3.3 kV. The output of the generators connected to British Thomson-Houston switchgear.

To manage their new power station and reticulation system the borough council created the Taumarunui electricity department with a permanent staff of H. F. (Henry) McLeod, electrical engineer on a yearly salary of £400; W. Milne, power station engineer on a yearly salary of £325; R.S. Uren, lineman on yearly salary of £250 and Crawford McHenry as assistant lineman on wages of £4 per week. Henry McLeod was to serve as an electrical engineer until his retirement in July 1949.

The power scheme had cost £50,000 to build and taken 18 months to complete. The power scheme was officially opened on 21 March 1924 by Prime Minister William Massey first at the power station at 2pm and then following dinner there was a separate evening ceremony in Hakiaka Street in Taumarunui when the street lights were switched on.

By August 1925 the uptake of electricity was such that Henry McLeod was recommending that more capacity be installed at Piriaka and that the 3.3 kV transmission voltage be increased to 11 kW. While no more capacity was added at Piriaka the borough council commenced a project in the later half of 1925 to upgrade the transmission voltage to 11 kV. This involved installing a 500 kVA transformer to step up the voltage at Piriaka, replacing the insulators on the 5 1/2 miles (8.85 km) of transmission lines and installing three step down transformers at various locations in the network.

By the 1927 financial year the connected load had increased to 440 kW during the day and 245 kW at night. In that same 12-month period the station generated 927,126 GWh, but the electricity department's metering could only account for 704,842 GWh.

=== Connection to the national electricity system ===
With it unable to meet the demand for more electricity the borough council after investigating other options such as installing a diesel generator at Piriaka reached an agreement with the government in 1938 to connect the local system to the national electricity system via a new transmission line. The connection to the bulk supply entered service on 2 April 1939. As a part of the agreement to take a bulk supply from the government it had been agreed that Piriaka would only be allowed to remain in service as a pumping station for the borough's water supply system. As a result, on 11 October 1939 Piriaka creased generating.

In May 1940 to help with the war effort and the demand for electricity from the new war-related industries Piriaka was returned to service, with the government requesting that it run at its maximum output, 24 hours a day. A shortage of staff meant that the PWD had to help repair the weir and tailrace, while the Auckland Electric Power Board loaned an operator to help run the power station.

A severe flood on 14 December 1958 damaged the weir, headworks and washed away approximately 2 chains (40 metres) of the canal's concrete lining which reduced the station head, allowing only one of its two generating units being able to remain in service. Even then there were regular stoppages to clear blocked intake screens. The repairs to the power scheme cost £14,000.

=== Upgrading ===
In the 1960s the power station's existing Turell voltage regulator was replaced by an ASEA solid state voltage regular which meant that the station's voltage did not now require constant attention, allowing the number of operators at the station to reduced from four (on a 24-hour shift) to two people.

By the late 1960s, Piriaka had been reduced to a single 300 kW generating unit. Mandeno Chitty & Bell were hired to design and oversee increasing the station's output. As a result, a modified Kaplan turbine driving a 700 kW generator was installed in February 1971 in a separate building. However, the new generating unit gave problems from the time it entered service. It was eventually determined that it had been installed a metre higher than it should have been installed. This led to compensation being paid to the Taumarunui Borough Council which was more than the cost of the new generating unit. Even as late as 1978 the new generating unit was still giving problems with cavitation of the turbine blades and leaking bearing seals, both issues eventually being resolved.

The commissioning in 1972 of the Western Diversion of the Tongariro power scheme resulted in the diversion of water from eight tributaries of the upper Whanganui River. By June 1973 so significant was the diversion of waters that it was impacting on the operation of Piriaka. By the end of the year, the NZED was playing compensation to the borough council, the amount depending upon weather conditions and the amount of water they were taking. The lower river flows attracted the attention of other parties which resulted in hearings by Rangitikei – Wanganui Catchment Board in 1982 with 17 submissions and again in 1988 with 1,250 submissions being received. Unhappy with the tribunal's ruling that the NZED and its successor, the Electricity Corporation of New Zealand (ECNZ), should return river flows to full into summer and half in winter and also continue to pay compensation they appealed the decision. By September 1989 a total of NZ$510,00 had been paid to date to the borough council for loss of generation at Piriaka.

In late 1978 a flood blocked the intake gates with mud and the mistake was made to allow the canal to drain through the generating units, rather than keeping it full of water. With nothing to push back against it, the pressure from the saturated ground beside canal caused the canal walls to collapse inwards. It took three months to repair the damage and return the power station to service.

In response to the passing of the 1987 Empowering Act, which opened the electricity supply industry to market forces discussion began between the Taumarunui Borough Council and the King Country Electric Power Board. As a result, the borough council in 1989 sold its electricity assets (including Piriaka) for NZ$750,000 to the power board.

In response to the 1992 Energy Companies Act, the King Country Electric Power Board on 1 July 1993 transitioned to a public company King Country Energy Ltd, which took over ownership of Piriaka.

In the early 1990s, a fire in the windings of the generating unit G1 resulted in it being out of service for 2 1/2 months.

== Design ==
The scheme was originally designed with provision to allow the mechanical output to be increased from 600 hp (447 kW) to 1,800 hp (1,342 kW).

Three one-metre-high concrete weirs, approximately 200 mm thick connecting natural islands on the Whanganui River impound water in a small headpond. From here water is diverted to control gates and then via a 232-metre-long (761 ft) concrete-lined canal to a forebay (fitted with screens) from which it flows through a buried 2.74-metre-diameter (9.0 ft) by 245-metre-long (804 ft) concrete penstock to a concrete surge chamber located beside the two powerhouses, from which water passes via penstocks to the turbines.

There are two powerhouses, the original 1924 building which houses two vertical Francis turbines, each powering a 0.25 MW generating unit, designated G2 and G3. In a separate adjacent building which was commissioned in 1971 is located generating unit G1 which consists of a horizontal Kaplan turbine driving a 1 MW synchronous generator. From each building, separate tailraces discharge the water back into the Whanganui River.

The scheme has a head of 8.2 metres. Because of the limited storage capacity in the headpond and canal the scheme is essentially run-of-river.

The power station has a total output of 1.3 MW and a mean output of 7 GWh per year.

At the power station the voltage is stepped up to 11 kV for transmission.

The power station is embedded within The Lines Company network behind Transpower's Hangitaki Substation, but can also be switched within The Lines Company network to support Transpower's Whakamaru substation on a limited supply basis.

== Operation ==
Operation of the power station is covered by the requirements of three resource consents which expire in December 2030.

As the power station is located in an area covered in pumice, the intake to the power station required regular maintenance in its early days to remove the pumice which had become dislodged and then floats down the river to build up behind the weir and block the intake.

== See also ==
- Hydroelectric power in New Zealand
