= Piriaka =

- Rural settlement
- Interactive map of Piriaka
- Coordinates: Topo Map 38.922°S 175.339°E
- Country: New Zealand
- Region: Manawatū-Whanganui
- District: Ruapehu District
- Ward: Ruapehu General Ward; Ruapehu Māori Ward
- Community: Taumarunui-Ōhura Community
- Electorates: Whanganui; Te Tai Hauāuru (Māori)

Government
  - Territorial Authority: Ruapehu District Council
  - Regional council: Horizons Regional Council
  - Mayor of Ruapehu: Weston Kirton
  - Whanganui MP: Carl Bates
  - Te Tai Hauāuru MP: Debbie Ngarewa-Packer

Area
  - Total: 0.75 km^{2} (0.29 sq mi)

Population (2023 Census)
  - Total: 138
  - Density: 180/km^{2} (480/sq mi)

Piriaka is a small rural settlement beside the Whanganui River, about 10 kilometres (6.2 mi) southeast of Taumarunui on State Highway 4 (SH4), in New Zealand's King Country. Its name is Māori, from piri (to cling close) and aka (bush climbers of various kinds, such as rata).

The Piriaka Power Station is about 1 kilometre (0.62 mi) north of the settlement.

The Piriaka springs can be found just to the south of Piriaka (beside SH4 just at it starts to climb up to a higher altitude) at 38°55′33″S 175°20′27″E. These springs are well known in the local area, and also provide the main water supply for the settlement.

About 1 kilometre (0.62 mi) further south along SH4, at 38°55′56″S 175°20′37″E, there is a lookout providing an excellent view of the Whanganui River. This spot is known as the Piriaka lookout.

== Demographics ==
Piriaka covers 0.75 km^{2} (0.29 sq mi). It is part of the larger Ngapuke statistical area.

Historical population
Year	Pop.	±% p.a.
2006	120	—
2013	108	−1.49%
2018	105	−0.56%
2023	138	+5.62%

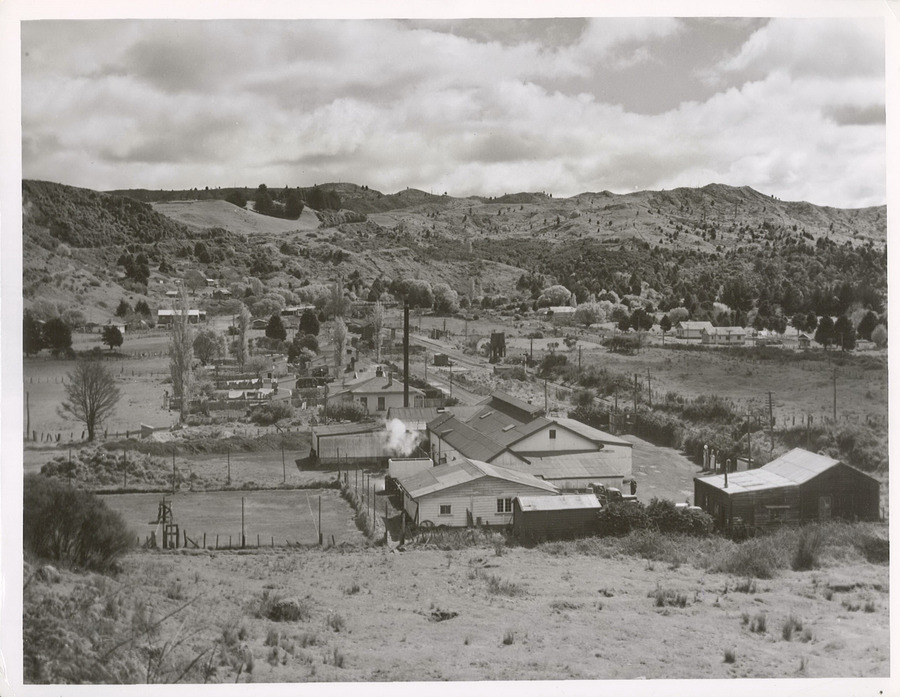
Piriaka in 1949

Piriaka had a population of 138 in the 2023 New Zealand census, an increase of 33 people (31.4%) since the 2018 census, and an increase of 30 people (27.8%) since the 2013 census. There were 66 males, 69 females, and 3 people of other genders in 51 dwellings. 4.3% of people identified as LGBTIQ+. The median age was 36.5 years (compared with 38.1 years nationally). There were 33 people (23.9%) aged under 15 years, 24 (17.4%) aged 15 to 29, 54 (39.1%) aged 30 to 64, and 27 (19.6%) aged 65 or older.

People could identify as more than one ethnicity. The results were 60.9% European (Pākehā), 58.7% Māori, 8.7% Pasifika, and 4.3% other, which includes people giving their ethnicity as "New Zealander". English was spoken by 93.5%, and Māori by 10.9%. No language could be spoken by 6.5% (e.g. too young to talk). The percentage of people born overseas was 4.3, compared with 28.8% nationally.

Religious affiliations were 21.7% Christian, and 2.2% Māori religious beliefs. People who answered that they had no religion were 58.7%, and 15.2% of people did not answer the census question.

Of those at least 15 years old, 9 (8.6%) people had a bachelor's or higher degree, 54 (51.4%) had a post-high school certificate or diploma, and 45 (42.9%) people exclusively held high school qualifications. The median income was $29,800, compared with $41,500 nationally. The employment status of those at least 15 was 42 (40.0%) full-time, 15 (14.3%) part-time, and 3 (2.9%) unemployed.

== See also ==
- Ruapehu District
- Piriaka railway station
