= Kaitieke =

- Rural community
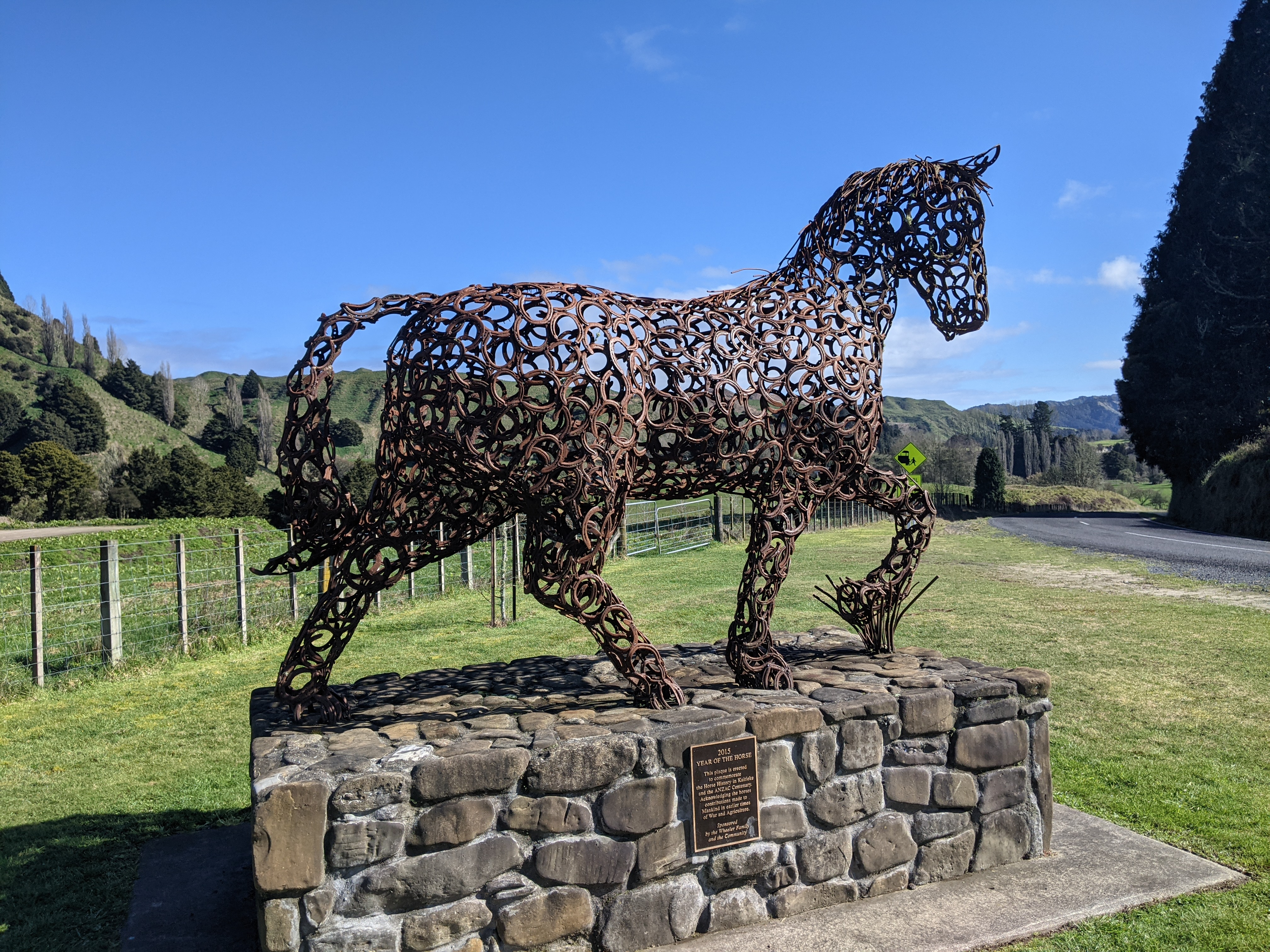
- Sculpture made of horseshoes to commemorate the horse history of Kaitieke
- Interactive map of Kaitieke
- Country: New Zealand
- Region: Manawatū-Whanganui
- District: Ruapehu District
- Ward: Ruapehu General Ward; Ruapehu Māori Ward
- Community: Taumarunui-Ōhura Community
- Electorates: Whanganui; Te Tai Hauāuru (Māori)

Government
  - Territorial Authority: Ruapehu District Council
  - Regional council: Horizons Regional Council
  - Mayor of Ruapehu: Weston Kirton
  - Whanganui MP: Carl Bates
  - Te Tai Hauāuru MP: Debbie Ngarewa-Packer

Area
  - Total: 375.22 km^{2} (144.87 sq mi)

Population (2023 Census)
  - Total: 105
  - Density: 0.280/km^{2} (0.725/sq mi)

Kaitieke or Kaitīeke is a rural community, located south of Taumarunui and 13 kilometres (8.1 mi) west of Raurimu, in the Ruapehu District and Manawatū-Whanganui region of New Zealand's North Island.

The area's name translates as to eat (kai) the saddleback bird (tieke).

== History ==
The area's steep rugged hills and valleys were once covered in thick native forest. However, with the arrival of European settlers in the early 1900s, most local forests were felled for farming between 1908 and 1915.

Kaitīeke School opened in 1913, and some small sawmills operated in the area during the 1920s.

The Spanish flu had a devastating impact on the community in November 1918, killing about 23% of the local Māori population.

Painter Edward (Ted) Lattey farmed south of the settlement in the 1920s, before leaving the King Country to become a professional painter. He became known for his paintings of native forests, including King Country scenes.

During World War I and again during the Great Depression, many farmers abandoned the land. By the mid-1930s about half the land cleared for farming had reverted to fern and scrub, and high rainfall caused soils to leach and lose their fertility. It was not until the introduction of aerial fertiliser topdressing after World War II that farming conditions began to improve.

The Kaitieke War Memorial was installed in January 1923, commemorating the 23 local men who died in World War I. A further inscription was made after World War II for the six local men who died in that war.

The Kaitieke and Retaruke Valley sports contest took place annually during Easter Weekend from 1917 until 2017, before ending because of a dwindling local population. The final event, in April 2017, featured period costumes.

== Demographics ==
Kaitieke locality covers 375.22 km^{2} (144.87 sq mi). It is part of the larger National Park statistical area.

Historical population
Year	Pop.	±% p.a.
2006	129	—
2013	114	−1.75%
2018	105	−1.63%
2023	105	+0.00%

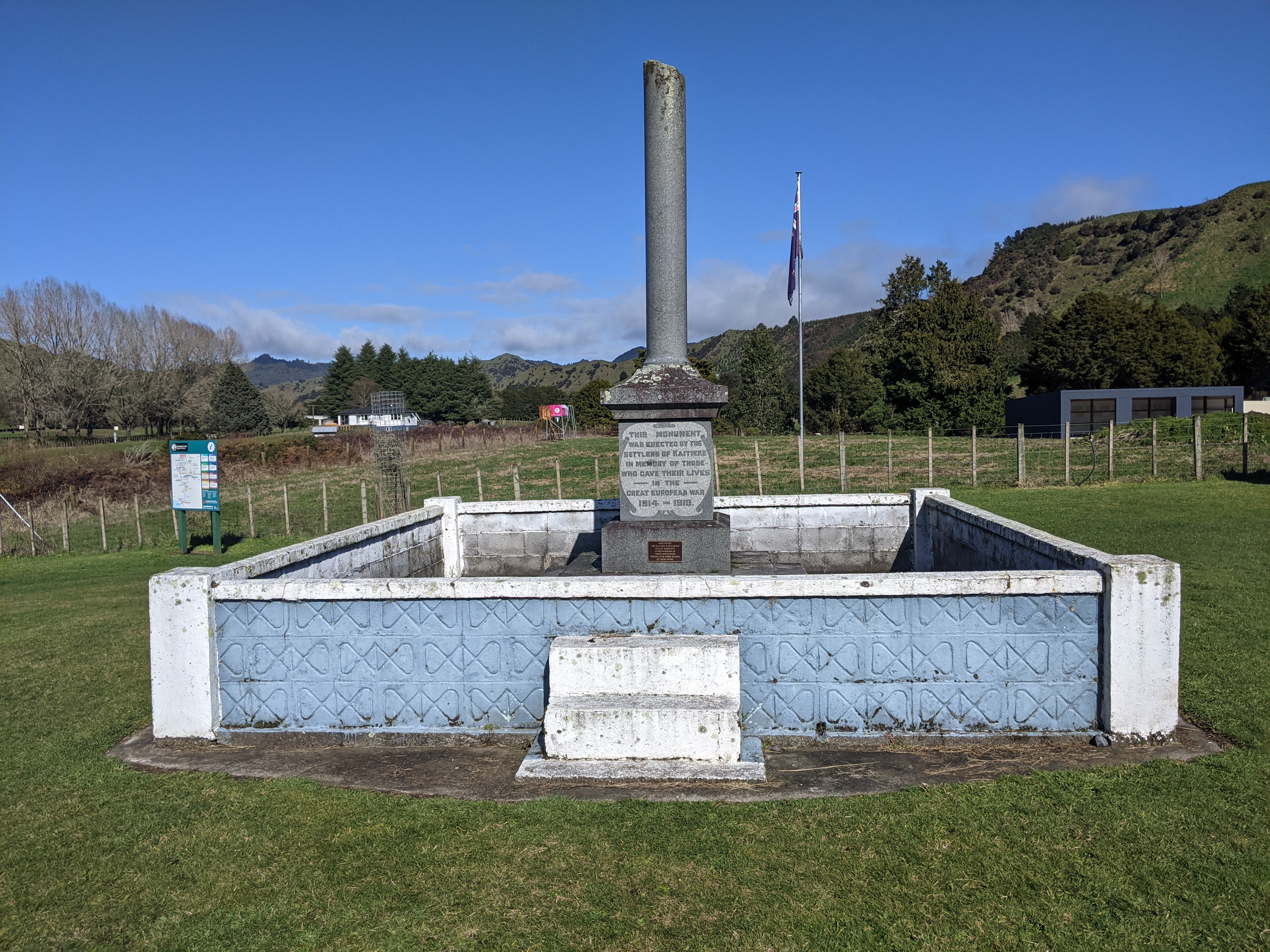
Kaitieke War Memorial

Kaitieke had a population of 105 in the 2023 New Zealand census, unchanged since the 2018 census, and a decrease of 9 people (−7.9%) since the 2013 census. There were 54 males and 51 females in 48 dwellings. The median age was 42.8 years (compared with 38.1 years nationally). There were 18 people (17.1%) aged under 15 years, 15 (14.3%) aged 15 to 29, 63 (60.0%) aged 30 to 64, and 12 (11.4%) aged 65 or older.

People could identify as more than one ethnicity. The results were 94.3% European (Pākehā), and 11.4% Māori. English was spoken by 97.1%, and other languages by 2.9%. No language could be spoken by 2.9% (e.g. too young to talk). The percentage of people born overseas was 11.4, compared with 28.8% nationally.

Religious affiliations were 20.0% Christian, and 2.9% Māori religious beliefs. People who answered that they had no religion were 68.6%, and 5.7% of people did not answer the census question.

Of those at least 15 years old, 9 (10.3%) people had a bachelor's or higher degree, 57 (65.5%) had a post-high school certificate or diploma, and 21 (24.1%) people exclusively held high school qualifications. The median income was $37,900, compared with $41,500 nationally. 9 people (10.3%) earned over $100,000 compared to 12.1% nationally. The employment status of those at least 15 was 54 (62.1%) full-time, 9 (10.3%) part-time, and 3 (3.4%) unemployed.

== Education ==
Kaitieke School is a co-educational state primary school for Year 1 to 8 students, with a roll of 8 as of July 2026. It opened in 1913.
