= Taumarunui =

Town in Manawatū-Whanganui Region, New Zealand

- Town
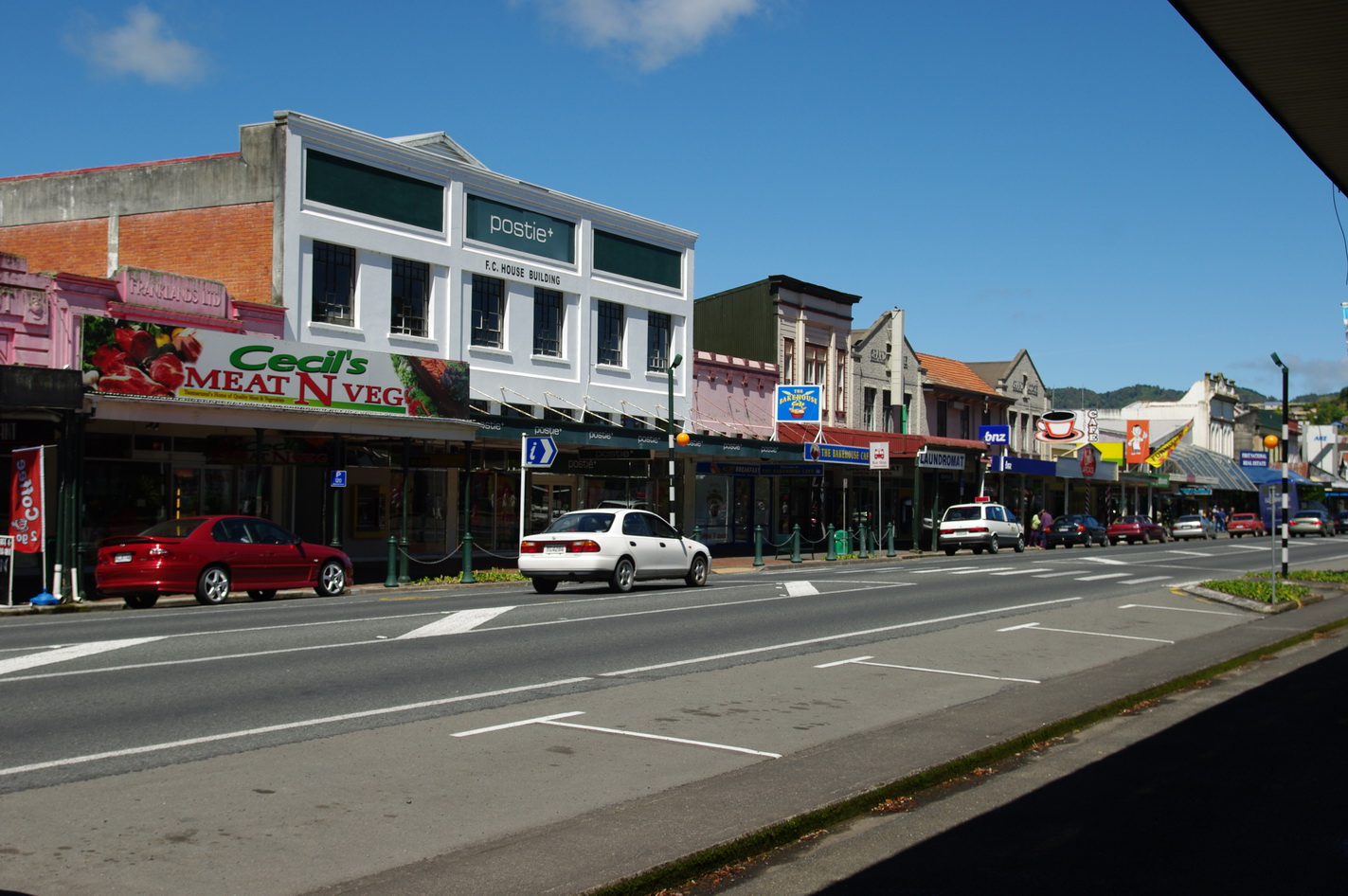
- Hakiaha Street in 2009
- Interactive map of Taumarunui
- Coordinates: 38°53.0′S 175°15.7′E
- Country: New Zealand
- Region: Manawatū-Whanganui
- District: Ruapehu District
- Ward: Ruapehu General Ward; Ruapehu Māori Ward
- Community: Taumarunui-Ōhura Community
- Electorates: Taranaki-King Country; Te Tai Hauāuru (Māori)

Government
  - Territorial Authority: Ruapehu District Council
  - Regional council: Horizons Regional Council
  - Mayor of Ruapehu: Weston Kirton
  - Taranaki-King Country MP: Barbara Kuriger
  - Te Tai Hauāuru MP: Debbie Ngarewa-Packer

Area
  - Total: 13.65 km^{2} (5.27 sq mi)

Population (June 2025)
  - Total: 4,940
- Postcode(s): 3920
- Area code: 07

Taumarunui is a town in the King Country of the central North Island of New Zealand. It is on an alluvial plain set within rugged terrain on the upper reaches of the Whanganui River, 65 km south of Te Kūiti and 55 km west of Tūrangi. It is under the jurisdiction of Ruapehu District and Manawatū-Whanganui region.

It has a population of 4,940 as of June 2025, and is the largest centre for a considerable distance in any direction. It is on State Highway 4 and the North Island Main Trunk railway.

== Name ==
The name Taumarunui is reported to be the dying words of the Māori chief Te Peehi Turoa – taumaru meaning screen and nui big, literally translated as Big Screen, being built to shelter him from the sun, or more commonly known to mean – "The place of big shelter". There are also references to Taumarunui being known as a large sheltered location for growing kūmara.

In the 1980s publication Roll Back the Years there are some details on how Taumarunui got its name. Extract: "According to Frank T Brown, who wrote in the Taumarunui Press in 1926, the name Taumarunui is closely connected with the arrival of and conquering of that portion of the King Country by the Whanganui River natives during the 18th century ... The war party that succeeded in capturing the principal pa and taking prisoner the chief of the district was headed by 'Ki Maru'. His warriors, to show their appreciation of his prowess and the honour of the victory, acclaimed him 'Tau-maru-nui', which means 'Maru the Great', or 'Maru the Conqueror', that name was taken for the district and has been used ever since."

== Locality ==
On State Highway 4 south of Taumarunui are the villages of Manunui, Piriaka, Kakahi, Ōwhango, Raurimu and then National Park. To the north are the school and truck stop of Māpiu.

== History and culture ==
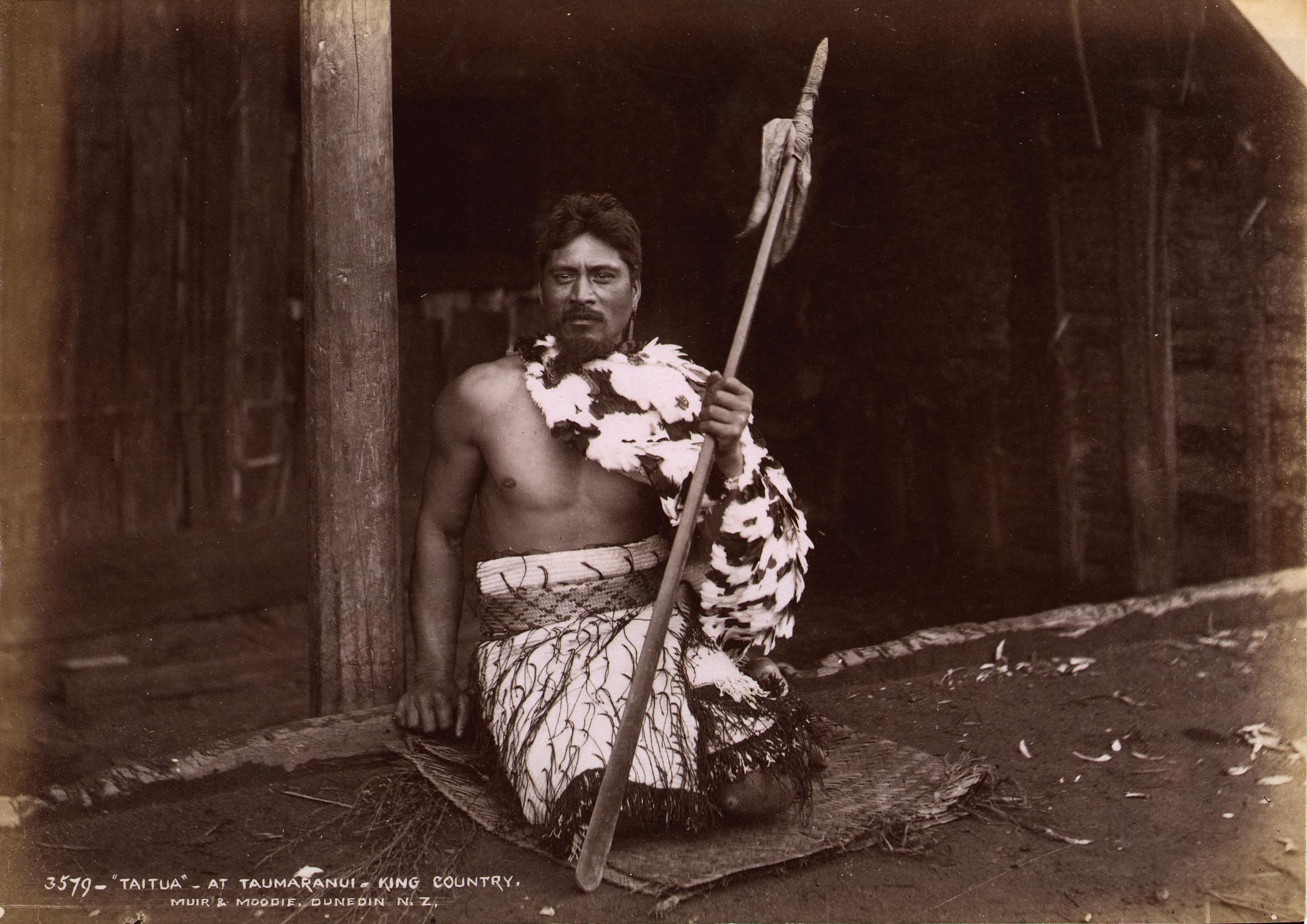
Taitua at Taumarunui in 1885

Taumarunui was originally a Māori settlement at the confluence of the Ongarue River with the Whanganui, important canoe routes linking the interior of the island with the lower Whanganui River settlements. Some places, notably the valley of the Pungapunga Stream, which joins the upper Whanganui near Manunui, were celebrated for the size and quality of tōtara, and large canoes were built there.

Late in December 1843 Bishop Selwyn travelled from the district south of Taupō to a point on the Whanganui River about six miles downstream from Taumarunui and thence continued his journey to the coast by canoe. Towards the end of 1869 Te Kooti was at Taumarunui before his march through the western Taupō district to Tapapa. In the early 1880s the first surveys of the King Country commenced, and by the early 1890s the Crown had begun the purchase of large areas of land.

In 1874, Alexander Bell set up a trading post, and became the first European settler. The town has a road called Bell Road.

During the New Zealand Wars a resident named William Moffatt manufactured and supplied Māori with a coarse kind of gunpowder. He was afterwards expelled from the district. Despite warnings, he returned in 1880, ostensibly to prospect for gold, and was executed.

The Whanganui River long continued to be the principal route serving Taumarunui. Traffic was at first by Māori canoe, but by the late 1880s regular steamship communication was established. Taumarunui Landing (Image) was the last stop on Alexander Hatrick's steam boat service from Wanganui. The river vessels maintained the services between Wanganui and Taumarunui until the late 1920s, when the condition of the river deteriorated.

Later, Taumarunui gained importance with the completion of the North Island Main Trunk line in 1908–09 (celebrated in the 1957 ballad "Taumarunui on the Main Trunk Line" by Peter Cape, about the station refreshment room). The line south of Taumarunui caused considerable problems due to the terrain, and has several high viaducts and the famous Raurimu Spiral. The Stratford–Okahukura Line to Stratford connected just north of Taumarunui. In more recent times, the town's economy has been based on forestry and farming. It has gained in importance as a tourism centre, especially as an entry point for voyagers down the scenic Wanganui River and as the possessor of a high-quality golf course.

=== Timeline ===
1800s

- 1862, 8/9 February – James Coutts Crawford visits, was given a number of old songs and "various accounts of the taniwha, one of whom we were told overthrew the Wangaehu bridge."
- 1864 – Boundaries of the King Country drawn and European settlement is prohibited.
- 1869 – Te Kooti in Taumarunui.
- 1871 – Thomas McDonnell in area following up on reports of gold. Claimed to have found goldbearing quartz in the creeks of 'Taurewa' .
- 1874 – Alexander Bell set up a trading post, and became the first European settler.
- 1880 – Moffatt and Henaro travel to the village of Matahaura, where William Moffatt is subsequently executed at Matapuna.
- 1883 – John Rochford's survey party start surveying the rail route through the King Country.
- 1884 – Prohibition to European settlement lifted. Alcohol prohibition established.
- 1885 – Photographer Alfred Burton, artist Edward Payton and surveyor John Rochford tour Te Rohe Pōtae along with time in Taumarunui.
- 1885, 10 Dec – First post office opened in Taumarunui (under the name 'Taumaranui') as part of the Hamilton Postal District, closes 1887.

1900–1914

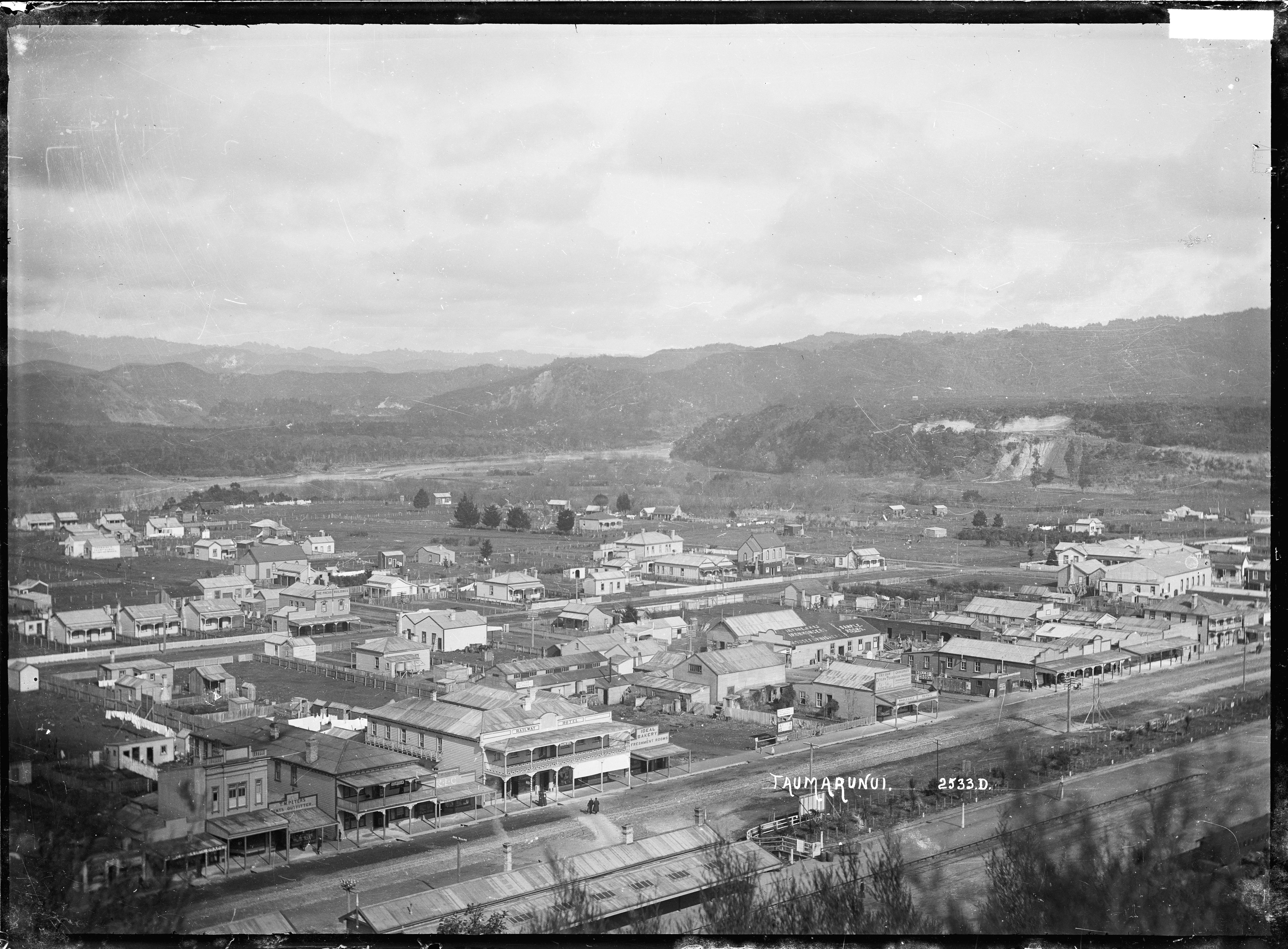
A view of Taumarunui, circa 1910s

- 1900 – town-to-be reportedly held only 13 European males. Another report said 40 or 50 members of Ngāti Hau and Mr Bell.
- 1901 – Railways line joining Te Kūiti to Taumarunui opened.
- 1903 – Railway line passes through Taumarunui, and Taumarunui Railway Station opened on 1 December 1903 and Matapuna on 22 June 1903.
- 1904 – First European child is born in township.
- 1904 – £10,000 houseboat built then floated to Ōhura river junction. In 1927 this is transferred down river to Retaruke River junction where it was destroyed by fire in 1933.
- 1906 – Native town council set up: Hakiaha Tawhiao, J.E. Ward (interpreter), J. Carrington. E.W. Simmons, A.J. Langmuir (chairman), J.E. Slattery.
- 1906, 14 Sep – First issue of the Taumarunui Press.
- 1907 – First hospital erected, 5 beds.
- 1908–09 – North Island Main Trunk opened to through Auckland-Wellington trains from 9 November 1908, with the first NIMT express trains from 14 February 1909.
- 1908–11 William Thomas Jennings elected Member of Parliament for Taumarunui electorate
- 1910 – Borough of Taumarunui proclaimed.
- 1910 – Kaitieke Co-op Dairy Co. formed.
- 1910 – George Henry Thompson defeated Rev John E. Ward (166 to 143 votes) to become the first borough council mayor.
- 1912 – Population: Males: 641; Females: 487 – Note: 1912 census did not include a count of Māori.
- 1912 – Water supply from Waitea Creek, just south of Piriaka. Project cost £13,000. Pipeline 8 miles long.
- 1913 – William Henry Wackrow – Mayor
- 1913, 22 Jul – First reported cases of smallpox in district.
- 1911–14 Charles Wilson elected Member of Parliament
- 1914 – Taumarunui gas supply begins

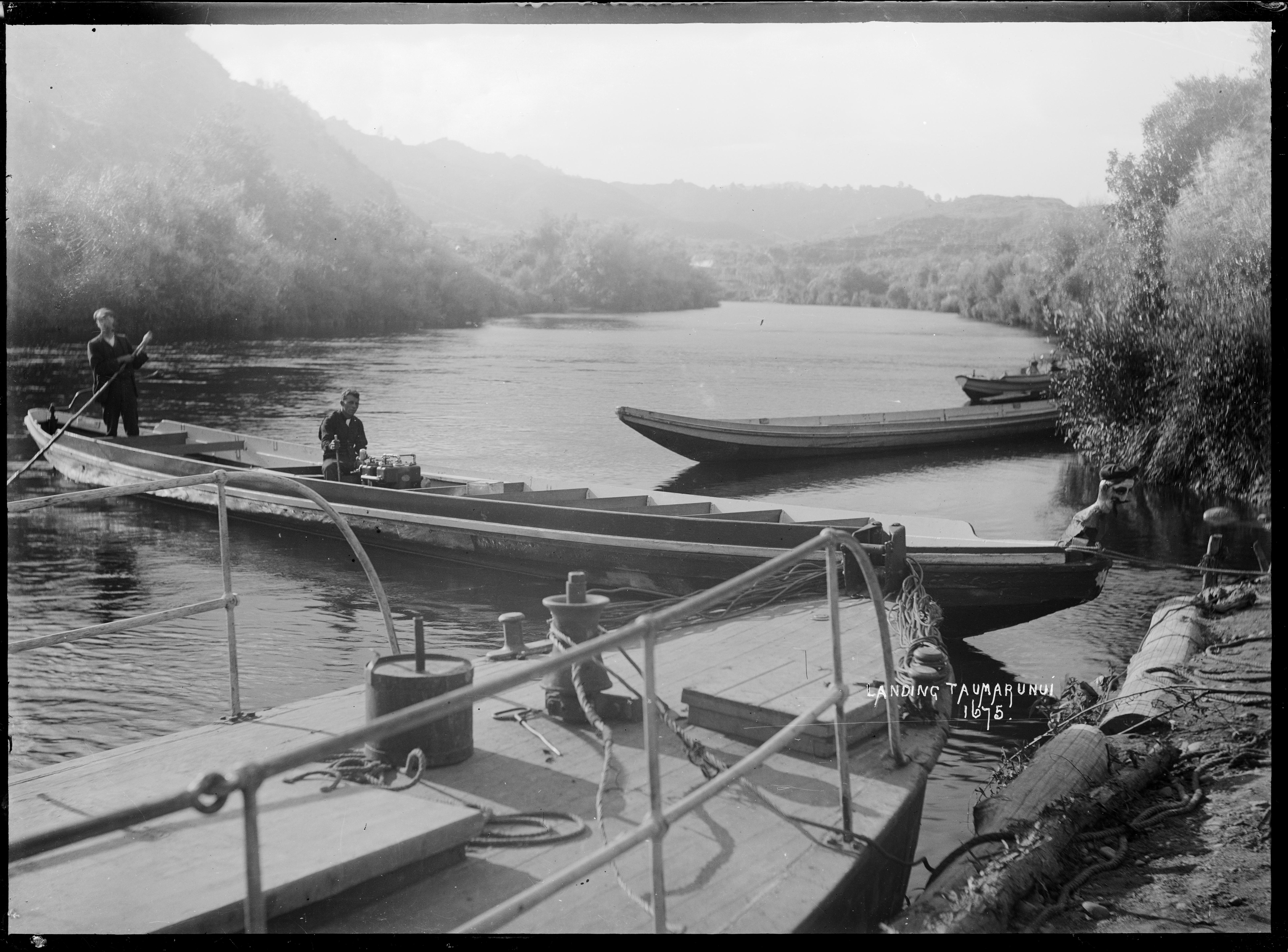
A landing on the Whanganui River at Taumarunui in motorised boats

1914–1939

- 1914–19 – William Thomas Jennings re-elected Member of Parliament
- 1915 – Taumarunui Hospital Board formed, 30 beds.
- 1915 – Only a single car in town.
- 1915–1917 – Mayor: G.S. Steadman.
- 1916 – Census: 3,021 (Taumarunui & Manunui)
- 1917 – Tuku Te Ihu Te Ngarupiki, Chief of Rangatahi, dies in Matapuna near Taumarunui aged 97.
- 1917–1919 – Mayor: A.S. Laird.
- 1919–1923 – Mayor: G.S. Steadman.
- 1923–1925 – Mayor: C.C. Marsack.
- 1924 – The Piriaka Power Station was built to supply electricity to Taumarunui.
- 1925–1929 – Mayor: G.E. Manson.
- 1928 – Four thousand bales of wool shipped down river
- 1929–1944 – Mayor: Cecil Boles.
- 1932 – Stratford–Okahukura Line completed.
- 1939 – Hatricks's steamer ceased running, final section of the journey having been done by coach from Kirikau landing since 1927.

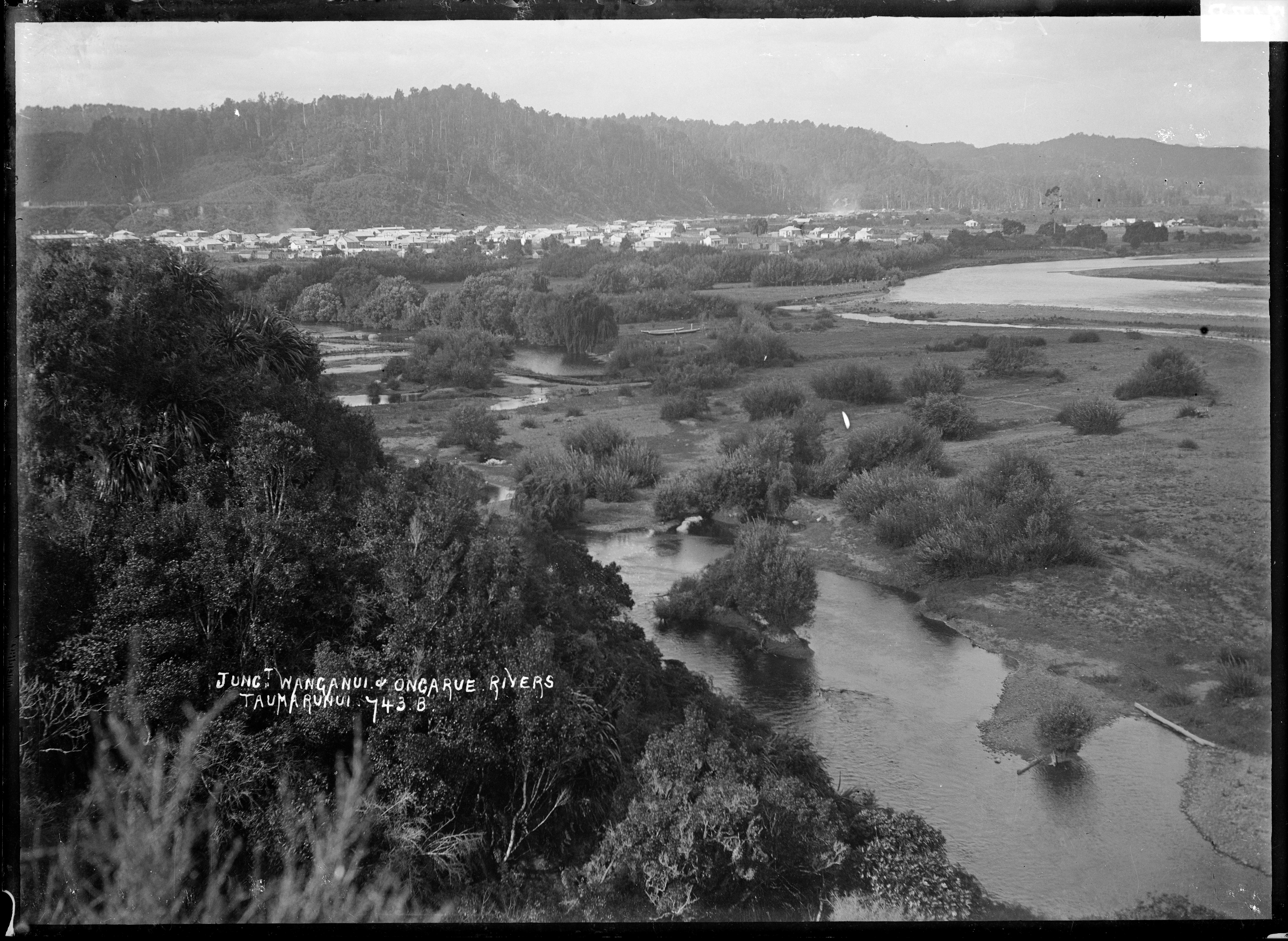
Junction of the Whanganui and Ongarue River

1939–1999

- 1941 – Cosmopolitan Club established with Father Conboy as first president.
- 1944–1947 – Mayor: W.S.N. Campbell.
- 1947–1953 – Mayor: D.H. Hall.
- 1951 – Census: 3,220
- 1952 – Kaitieke County and Ohura County amalgamated with Taumarunui County.
- 1953–1956 – Mayor: David C. Seath – later Member of Parliament for the King Country
- 1956 – Mayor: Frank D. House – later Taumarunui High School governor.
- 1956 – Census: 3,341
- 1961 – Census: 4,961
- 1962 – The King Country Electric Power Board commissioned its Kuratau Power Station.
- 1966 – 1 October, 6:00pm – King Country Radio 1520AM with the call sign 1ZU first broadcasts from Taumarunui.
- 1968 – N.Z. Sportsmen's dinner – attended by Fred Allen, Peter Snell, Waka Nathan, Colin Meads, Bob Skelton, Taini Jamison, Tilley Vercoe, Ivan Grattan, Bill Wordley, Don Croot, Trevor Ormsby, Hine Peni and Sonny Bolstad.
- 1971 – Additional generator to the Piriaka Power Scheme
- 1976, 4 Oct – Daniel Houpapa shot by Armed Offenders Squad after he fires at an officer
- 1981 – Census: 6,540, Full-time in labour force: 2,727
- 1986 – Census: 6,468, Full-time in labour force: 2,514
- 1988 – Taumarunui District Council formed.

Town Mayors immediately prior to 1988 include: Charles Binzegger, Les Byars and Terry Podmore.

- 1989, 1 Nov – Taumarunui District Council merged into Ruapehu District Council.
- 1991 – Census: 6,141, Full-time in labour force: 1,935
- 1996 – Census: 5,835, Full-time in labour force: 1,438
- 1997/98 – AFFCO Holdings freezing works closes.

2000s

- 2001 – Census: 5,139
- 2005/06 – Taumarunui Milk Co-op closes – 95 years after the original Kaitieke Co-op Dairy Co. was opened.
- 2006 – Census: 5,052
- 2009, Nov – Stratford–Okahukura Line mothballed.
- 2010, 31 Mar – King Country Radio 1512AM & 92.7FM with the call sign 1ZU goes off air.
- 2012, 25 Jun – Taumarunui Station passenger stop dropped from Northern Explorer's schedule.
- 2013 – Census: 4,500
- 2018 – Census: 4,707
- 2023 – Census: 4,821

=== Local government ===
In 1910, Taumarunui Borough was formed, with its own borough council and mayor. In 1988, Taumarunui District was formed, only to be replaced the following year as it was merged into the now Ruapehu District.

Between 1910 and 1988, Taumarunui Borough had 15 mayors. The following is a complete list:

	Name	Term of office
1	G. H. Thompson	1910–1912
2	W. H. Wackrow	1912–1914
3	E. W. Simmons	1914–1915
4	George Samuel Steadman	1915–1917
5	Alexander Smith Laird	1917–1919
(4)	George Samuel Steadman	1919–1923
6	Charles Marsack	1923–1925
7	George Edward Manson	1925–1929
8	Cecil Augustus Boles	1929–1944
9	William Alexander Nisbet Campbell	1944–1947
10	Douglas Hamilton Hall	1947–1953
11	David Coutts Seath	1953–1956
12	Frank Douglas House	1956–1962
13	Les Byars	1962–1974
14	Charles Binzegger	1974–1977
(13)	Les Byars	1977–1986
15	Terry Podmore	1986–1988

=== Marae ===
There are a number of marae in the Taumarunui area, affiliated with local iwi and hapū, including:

- Kimihia Marae is affiliated with Ngāti Te Wera
- Morero Marae and Hauaroa is affiliated with Ngāti Hekeawai and the Ngāti Hāua hapū of Ngāti Hāuaroa and Ngāti Reremai
- Ngāpuwaiwaha Marae and Te Taurawhiri a Hinengākau is affiliated with the Ngāti Hāua hapū of Ngāti Hāua and Ngāti Hāuaroa
- Petania Marae and Hinemihi meeting house are affiliated with the Ngāti Maniapoto hapū of Hinemihi, Parewaeono and Rōrā, and the Ngāti Tūwharetoa hapū of Ngāti Hinemihi
- Takaputiraha Marae is affiliated with Ngāti Maniapoto
- Te Peka Marae is affiliated with the Ngāti Hāua hapū of Ngāti Hekeāwai
- Tū Whenua Marae and Tū Whenua meeting house is affiliated with the Ngāti Maniapoto hapū of Mangu, Rewa and Tupu
- Whānau Maria Marae and Whānau Maria meeting house is affiliated with the Ngāti Hāua hapū of Ngāti Hāua
- Wharauroa Marae and Hikurangi meeting house is affiliated with the Ngāti Maniapoto hapū of Hinemihi, Rangatahi; with the Ngāti Hāua hapū of Ngāti Hekeawai, Ngāti Hinewai, Ngāti Hāuaroa, Ngāti Hāua, and Ngāti Wera/Tuwera; with Ngāti Hinewai; and with Ngāti Rangatahi.

In October 2020, the Government committed $1,560,379 from the Provincial Growth Fund to upgrade Takaputiraha Marae, Whānau Maria Marae, Wharauroa Marae and 5 other nearby marae.

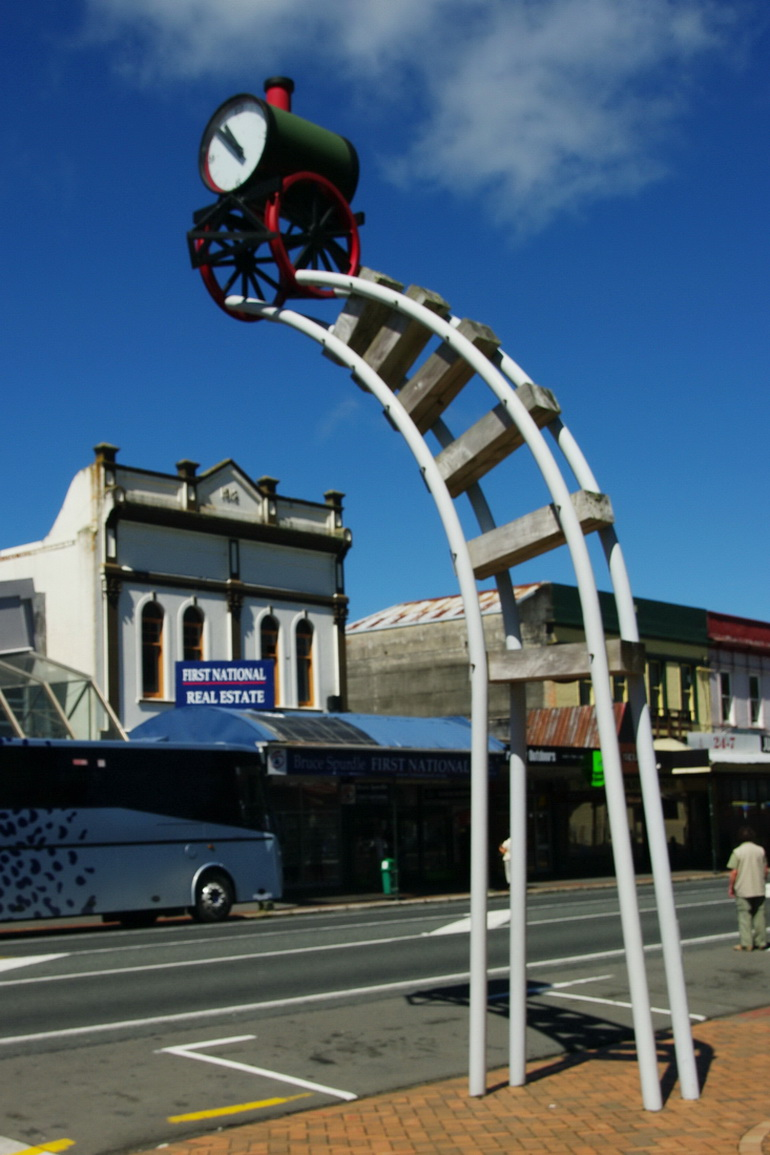
Railway station clock

== Demographics ==
Stats NZ describes Taumarunui as a small urban area, which covers 13.65 km^{2} (5.27 sq mi). It had an estimated population of 4,930 as of June 2025, with a population density of 361 people per km^{2}.

Historical population
Year	Pop.	±% p.a.
2006	4,995	—
2013	4,446	−1.65%
2018	4,710	+1.16%
2023	4,821	+0.47%

Taumarunui had a population of 4,821 in the 2023 New Zealand census, an increase of 111 people (2.4%) since the 2018 census, and an increase of 375 people (8.4%) since the 2013 census. There were 2,373 males, 2,430 females, and 15 people of other genders in 1,953 dwellings. 2.4% of people identified as LGBTIQ+. The median age was 40.6 years (compared with 38.1 years nationally). There were 1,014 people (21.0%) aged under 15 years, 822 (17.1%) aged 15 to 29, 1,917 (39.8%) aged 30 to 64, and 1,068 (22.2%) aged 65 or older.

People could identify as more than one ethnicity. The results were 60.5% European (Pākehā); 54.6% Māori; 4.1% Pasifika; 3.4% Asian; 0.6% Middle Eastern, Latin American and African New Zealanders (MELAA); and 2.1% other, which includes people giving their ethnicity as "New Zealander". English was spoken by 96.3%, Māori by 15.7%, Samoan by 0.4%, and other languages by 4.6%. No language could be spoken by 2.2% (e.g. too young to talk). New Zealand Sign Language was known by 0.6%. The percentage of people born overseas was 10.6, compared with 28.8% nationally.

Religious affiliations were 29.4% Christian, 0.7% Hindu, 0.3% Islam, 5.0% Māori religious beliefs, 0.6% Buddhist, 0.9% New Age, and 1.1% other religions. People who answered that they had no religion were 53.7%, and 9.1% of people did not answer the census question.

Of those at least 15 years old, 345 (9.1%) people had a bachelor's or higher degree, 2,160 (56.7%) had a post-high school certificate or diploma, and 1,296 (34.0%) people exclusively held high school qualifications. The median income was $28,100, compared with $41,500 nationally. 111 people (2.9%) earned over $100,000 compared to 12.1% nationally. The employment status of those at least 15 was 1,464 (38.5%) full-time, 429 (11.3%) part-time, and 201 (5.3%) unemployed.

Individual statistical areas
Name	Area (km^{2})	Population	Density (per km^{2})	Dwellings	Median age	Median income
Taumarunui North	3.60	1,656	460	636	40.7 years	$28,800
Taumarunui Central	3.54	1,542	278	693	44.8 years	$28,100
Taumarunui East	4.52	1,623	359	618	37.7 years	$27,500
New Zealand					38.1 years	$41,500

== Climate ==
Under the Köppen, Taumarunui has an Oceanic climate:(Cfb). Due to location, low altitude and Geography surroundings, Taumarunui is more liable to warm to hot summers than other central North Island centres and in winter, Taumarunui is cold and frosty. Rainfall yearly is 1,449 mm (57.047244 in). Annual sunshine yearly is 1822 hrs. In June 2002, Taumarunui recorded just 27 hrs of sun, this is the lowest in the whole country, beating the old record at Invercargill with 35 hrs in June 1935. The lowest temperature recorded in Taumarunui, −7.2 °C (19.0 °F), was in August 2026.

Climate data for Taumarunui (1991–2020 normals, extremes 1947–present)
Month	Jan	Feb	Mar	Apr	May	Jun	Jul	Aug	Sep	Oct	Nov	Dec	Year
Record high °C (°F)	34.0 (93.2)	33.4 (92.1)	32.4 (90.3)	28.3 (82.9)	23.1 (73.6)	20.6 (69.1)	20.0 (68.0)	21.7 (71.1)	25.5 (77.9)	27.8 (82.0)	30.9 (87.6)	33.9 (93.0)	34.0 (93.2)
Mean daily maximum °C (°F)	23.8 (74.8)	24.2 (75.6)	22.5 (72.5)	19.0 (66.2)	15.5 (59.9)	12.9 (55.2)	12.2 (54.0)	13.6 (56.5)	15.3 (59.5)	17.4 (63.3)	19.6 (67.3)	22.0 (71.6)	18.2 (64.7)
Daily mean °C (°F)	17.7 (63.9)	18.0 (64.4)	16.2 (61.2)	13.2 (55.8)	10.5 (50.9)	8.1 (46.6)	7.5 (45.5)	8.6 (47.5)	10.3 (50.5)	12.1 (53.8)	13.8 (56.8)	16.2 (61.2)	12.7 (54.8)
Mean daily minimum °C (°F)	11.5 (52.7)	11.8 (53.2)	9.8 (49.6)	7.4 (45.3)	5.4 (41.7)	3.3 (37.9)	2.8 (37.0)	3.6 (38.5)	5.4 (41.7)	6.8 (44.2)	7.9 (46.2)	10.4 (50.7)	7.2 (44.9)
Record low °C (°F)	0.4 (32.7)	0.3 (32.5)	−2.8 (27.0)	−2.6 (27.3)	−5.7 (21.7)	−6.1 (21.0)	−6.8 (19.8)	−7.2 (19.0)	−4.5 (23.9)	−4.2 (24.4)	−1.6 (29.1)	0.7 (33.3)	−7.2 (19.0)
Average rainfall mm (inches)	107.9 (4.25)	91.4 (3.60)	80.6 (3.17)	119.4 (4.70)	141.6 (5.57)	145.4 (5.72)	156.8 (6.17)	147.2 (5.80)	154.8 (6.09)	144.0 (5.67)	124.0 (4.88)	132.6 (5.22)	1,545.7 (60.84)
Mean monthly sunshine hours	211.8	195.0	182.6	139.7	104.3	80.4	97.3	123.7	126.5	159.8	174.2	181.7	1,777
Source: NIWA

== Community institutions ==
Ngāpuwaiwaha marae is on Taumarunui Street; its main hapū are Ngāti Hāua and Ngāti Hauaroa of the iwi Te Āti Haunui-a-Pāpārangi.

Taumarunui has many societies and community organisations. It has a Cosmopolitan Club and RSA, a Lodge of the Freemasons as well as Taumarunui Lodge NZ No. 12 of the Royal Antediluvian Order of Buffaloes Grand Council. This Lodge of the Buffaloes was established sometime in the mid-late 1920s and thus predates the introduction of the Mighty NZR KA class steam locomotives that became the hallmark of NIMT Rail Transport of the forties, fifties and sixties.

== Education ==
Taumarunui High School is a state secondary school for Year 9 to 13 students, with a roll of 300. It opened behind Taumarunui Primary School in 1918. In 1923 it moved to Tumoana and Turaki streets. It moved to its current site on Golf Road in 1956.

The town has three state primary schools for Year 1 to 8 students: Taumarunui Primary School, with a roll of 142, Tarrangower School, with a roll of 63, and Turaki School, with a roll of 182. Taumarunui Primary opened in 1901 as Hauaroa Native School. In 1909 it became part of the mainstream education system, and changed to its current name. Tarrangower School opened in 1970 as Golf Road School and changed to the current name in 1971. Turaki Primary School was founded in 1956.

St Patrick's Catholic School is a state-integrated Catholic primary school for Year 1 to 8 students, with a roll of 61. It opened in 1916.

All these schools are co-educational. Rolls are as of July 2026.

== Notable people ==
- T.J. Meredith – 3rd great-grandson of Theodore of Corsica, joined Royal Navy age 14, CSS Louisiana in 1862 American Civil War, under General Cameron New Zealand Wars, Waikato Mounted Rifles World War I, before coming the proprietor of Taumarunui's Meredith House with wife Margaret Lovett.

Students of Taumarunui High School

- James L. Beck – Professor of Engineering and Applied Science, California Institute of Technology.
- John C. Butcher ONZM – Honorary Research Professor, Dept. of Mathematics, University of Auckland.
- Ben Fouhy, world champion kayaker.
- Marc and Todd Hunter from the band Dragon.
- Ivan Mercep, 2008 recipient of the New Zealand Institute of Architects Gold Medal.
- Jenny Ludlam – actress.

Born in Taumarunui

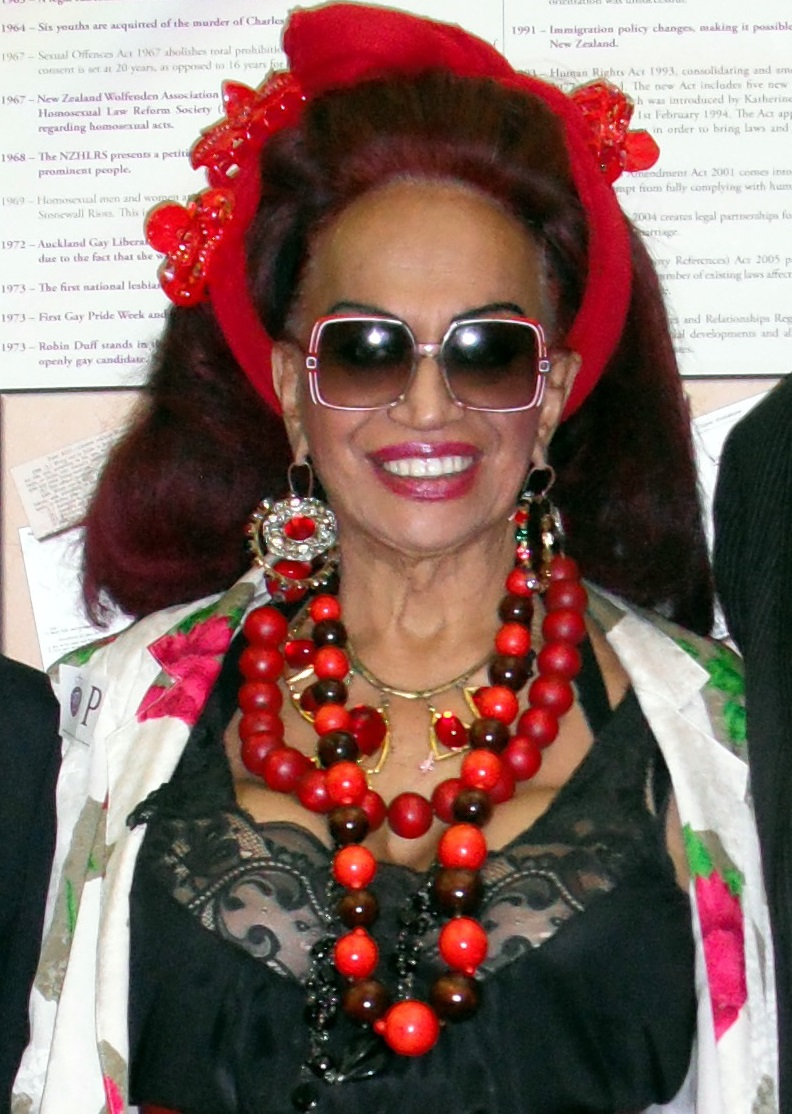
Carmen Rupe

- 1914 – Wiremu Hakopa Toa Te Āwhitu SM (1914–1994) was the first Māori to be ordained a Catholic priest.
- 1922 – Lucy Ruth Miller (Ruth Kirk), DBE, wife of Prime Minister Norman Kirk and patron of SPUC
- 1934 – Ian Barker, solicitor, judge, and legal scholar
- 1935 – Don Selwyn, actor, director, stage and screen, Ngāti Kurī and Te Aupōuri (1935–2007)
- 1936 – Carmen Rupe (né Trevor Rupe, 1935–15 December 2011) – Wellington personality (mayoral candidate (1977), drag queen, cafe owner and brothel keeper).
- 1939 – David Penny, theoretical biologist.
- 1945 – Carole Shepheard, artist.
- 1951 – Joe Karam, rugby union player, researcher and investigator for David Bain's legal team.
- 1952 – Rhonda Bryers, singer
- 1952 – Ian Ferguson, Olympic canoer.
- 1952 – Max Takuira Matthew Mariu SM (1952–2005), Auxiliary Catholic Bishop of Hamilton (1988–2005), first Māori to be ordained a Catholic bishop.
- 1952 – Gary Troup, ONZM, cricketer and Auckland region local government politician
- 1953 – Marc Hunter, lead singer of Dragon.
- 1955 – Mahinārangi Tocker, singer.
- 1956 – Len Brown Mayor of Auckland
- 1958 – Jillian Smith, field hockey player.
- 1958 – Lindsay Crocker, cricketer.
- 1963 – Timothy J. Sinclair, political scientist at the University of Warwick in England.
- 1966 – John Psathas, composer
- 1971 – Kyle Chapman, former leader of the New Zealand National Front
- 1973 – Chris McCormack World Champion Ironman Triathlete (2007, 2010).
- 1979 – Ben Fouhy, Olympic and world champion canoeist
- 1981 – Andrew Kirton, former General Secretary of the New Zealand Labour Party

Resident and New Years Honours recipients

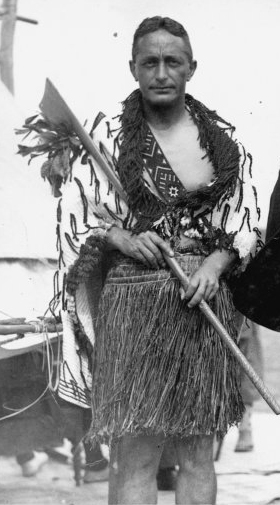
Pei Te Hurinui Jones

- 1956 – OBE – Pateriki Joseph Hura – For services to the Māori people, especially as a member of the Board of Maori Affairs.
- 1957 – MBE – Mrs Catherine Goodsir – For social welfare services
- 1958 – MBE – Mrs Rumatiki Wright of Raetihi. For services to the Māori people, especially as Senior Lady Māori Welfare Officer
- 1961 – OBE – Pei Te Hurinui Jones – For services to the Māori people.
- 1967 – MBE – James Dempsey J.P. – chairman of the Taumarunui County Council.
- 1970 – BEM – Eric Raymond Clark – For services to the community and interest in the education of the Māori people.
- 1974 – BEM – Arthur Tukiri Anderson – For services to the Returned Services Association and the community
- 1979 – KBE – Hepi Hoani Te Heuheu – For services to the Māori people and community.
- 1995 – CBE – Alexander Phillips QSM – For services to the Māori people.
- 1998 – MNZM – John Stacey Black J.P. – For services to the community.
- 2000 – QSM – Jean Bassett – For Community Service
- 2001 – QSM – Mrs Verna Lenice Warner J.P. – For Community Service
- 2002 – MNZM – Mrs Nansi Whetu Dewes – For services to Māori and the community
- 2002 – QSM – Barry David FISHER, of Taumarunui. Chief Fire Officer, Taumarunui Volunteer Fire Brigade, New Zealand Fire Service – For Services to the community
- 2003 – QSM – Leonard Patrick Harwood – For Public Services
- 2007 – QSM – Mr William Vernon McMinn – For services to music.
- 2009 – MNZM – Ngarau Tarawa – For services to Māori and community education
- 2010 – QSM – Mrs Lorraine Ivy Edwards J.P. – For services to the community.
- 2012 – MNZM – Ian Trevor Corney – For services to agriculture
- 2013 – ONZM – Susan May Morris – For services to local government.
