= Knight's Tram =

Coordinates: 39.1210°S 175.3961°E

Knight's tram, Raurimu
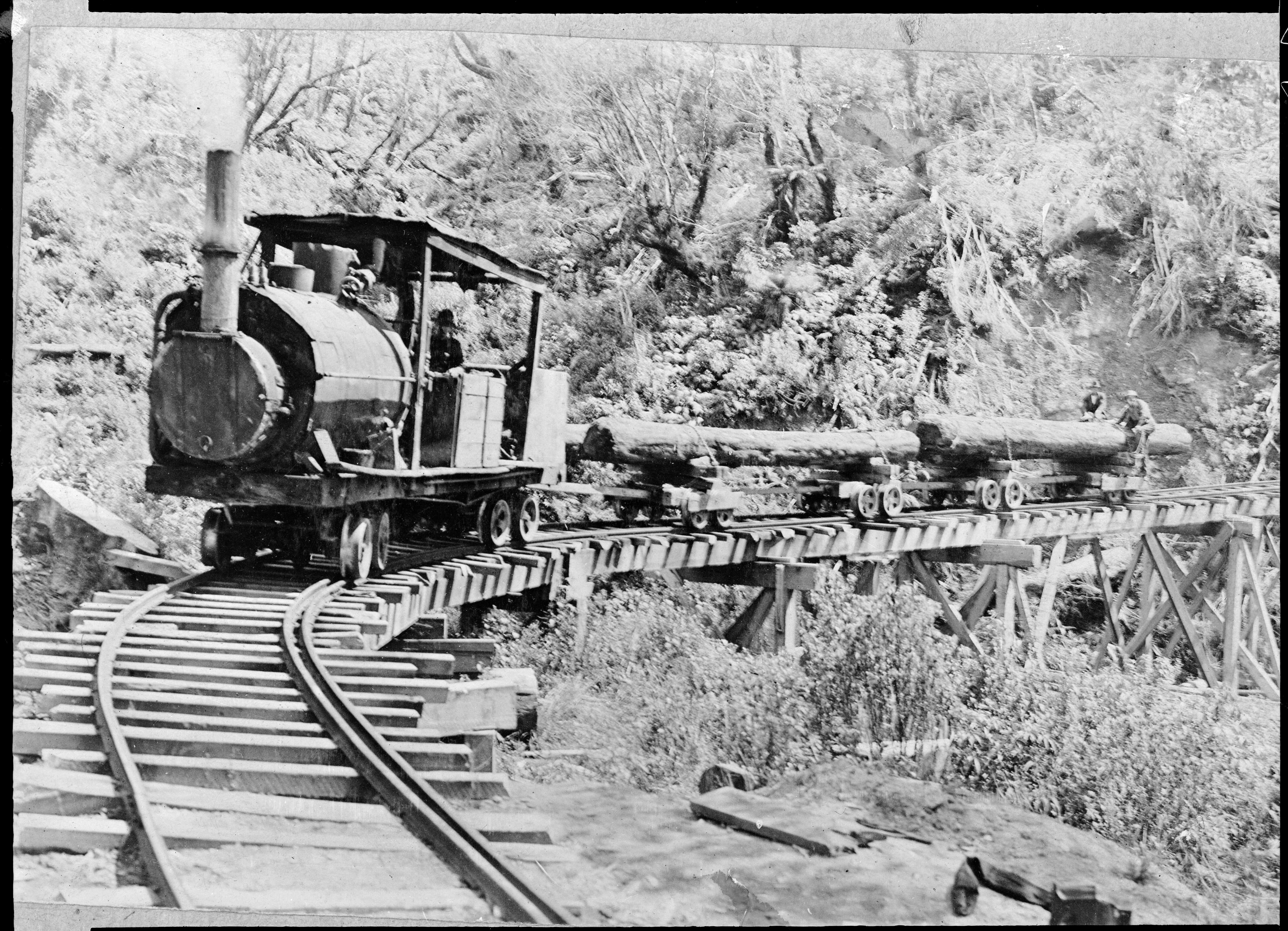
- Knight's tram, Raurimu, hauling logs over trestle

Technical
- Track gauge: 3 1/2 feet (1,067 mm)

Knight's tram, Raurimu was a bush tramway owned by the Tamaki Sawmill Co., Raurimu and managed by Len Knight (formally Benjamin Leonard Knight). It was located at Raurimu in the central North Island of New Zealand, connecting to the North Island Main Trunk Railway. The tramway with a track gauge of 3 1/2 feet (1,067 mm) was used for at least ten years from 1912 to 1922.

== Locomotives ==
- A & G Price, Type C 0-4-4-0, built 1912 with second-hand boiler and a twin vertical engine in the cab, used 1912-1922 B.L. Knight, Raurimu
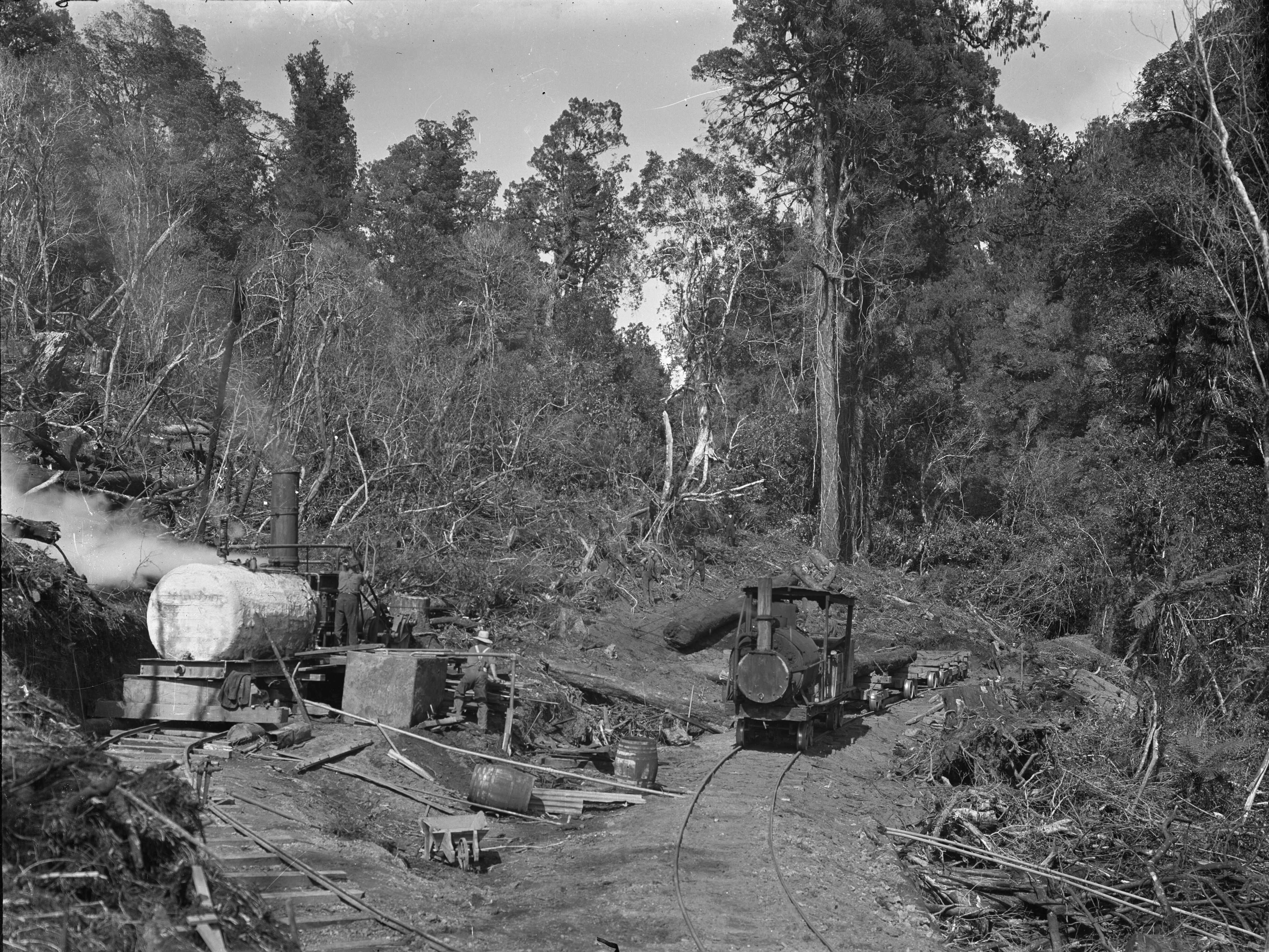
Knight's tram and a steam hauler, Raurimu, in a clearing in the bush

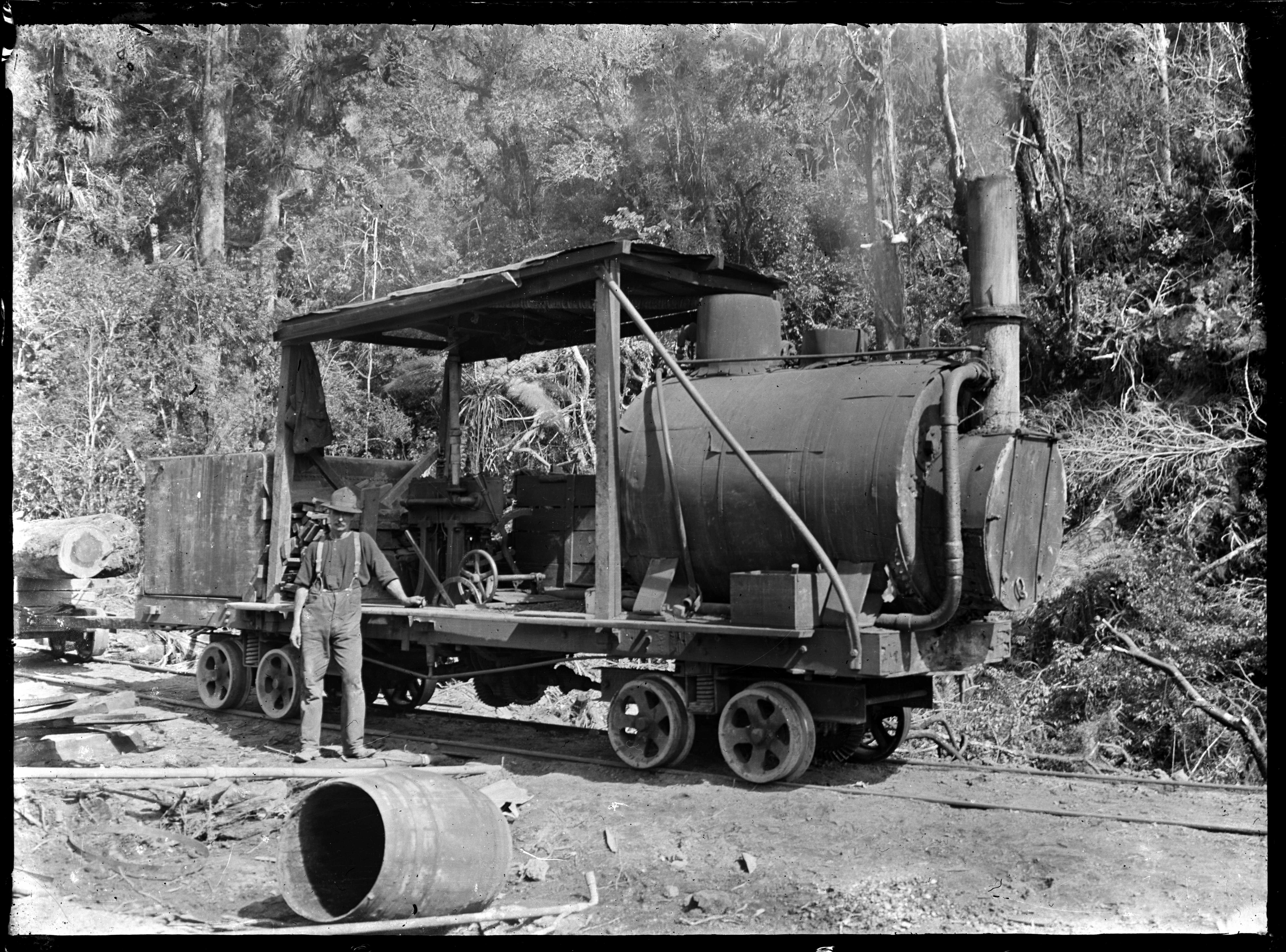
Price type "O" bush locomotive at Raurimu, ca. 1917

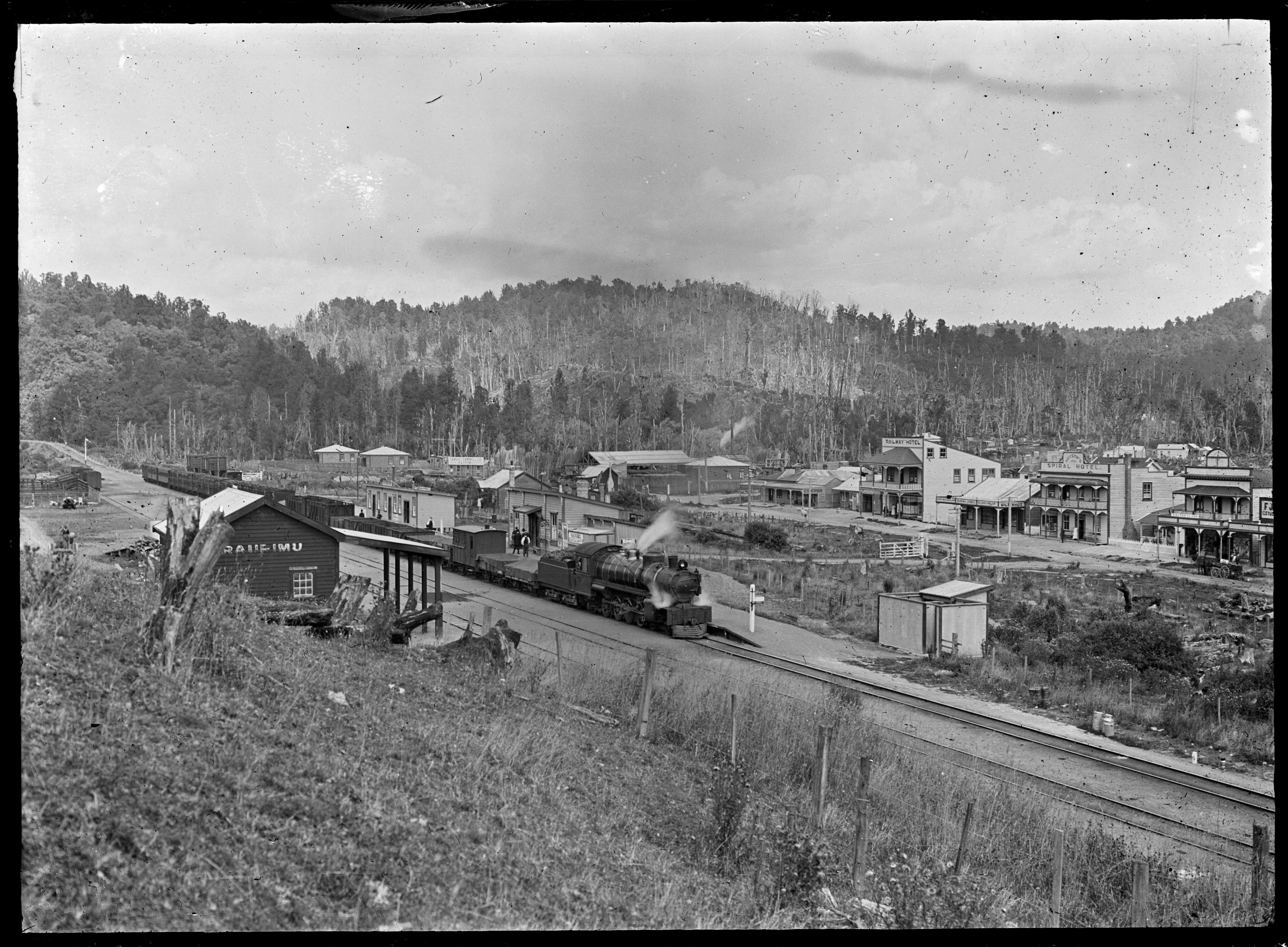
Offices of the Tamaki Sawmill Co. at Raurimu railway station

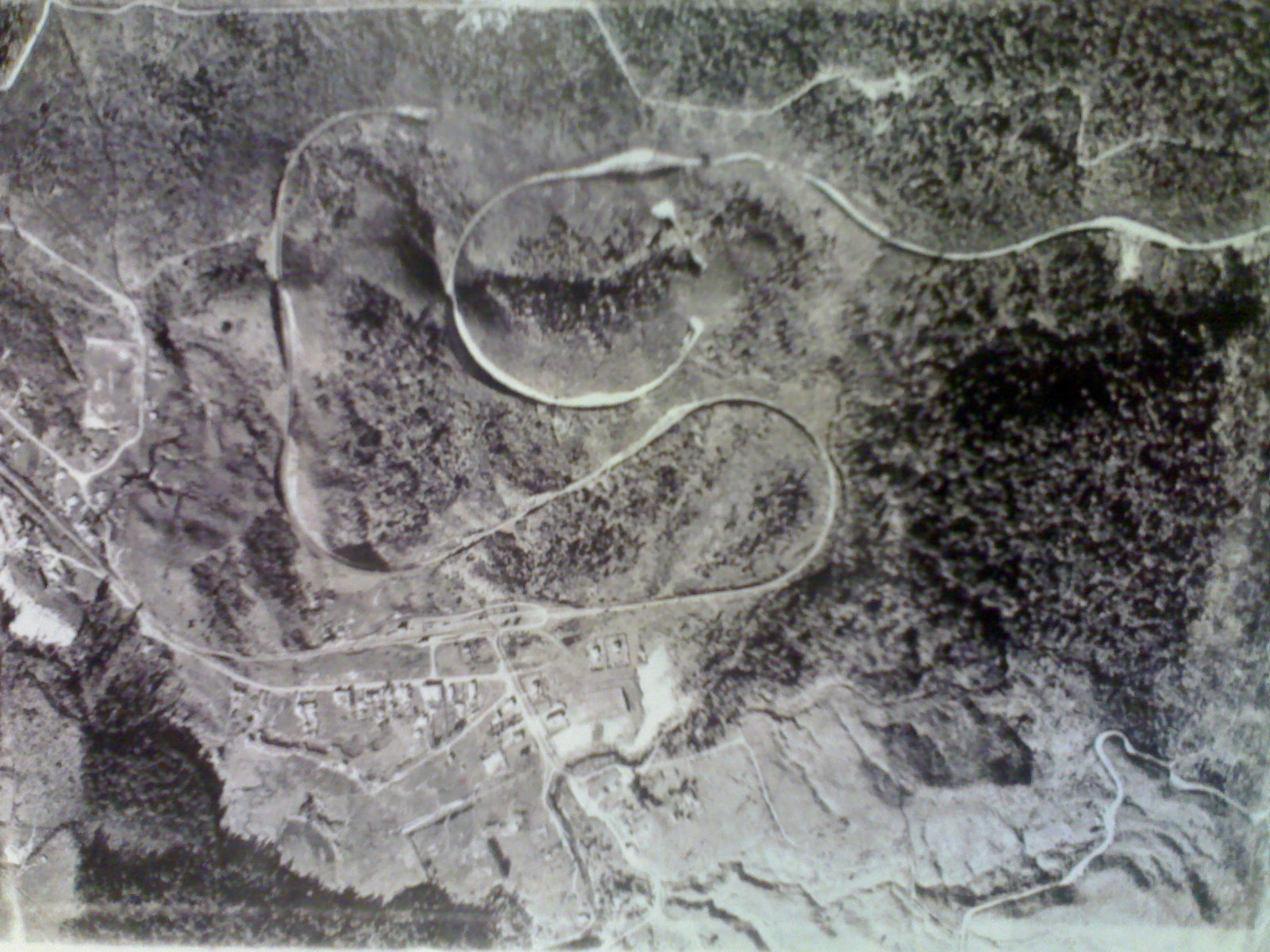
Raurimu Spiral in 2007 (no remains of tramways visible)

== See also ==
- Raurimu Spiral
