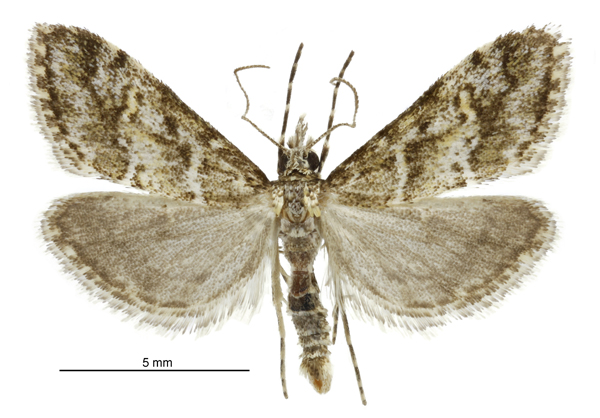
- male
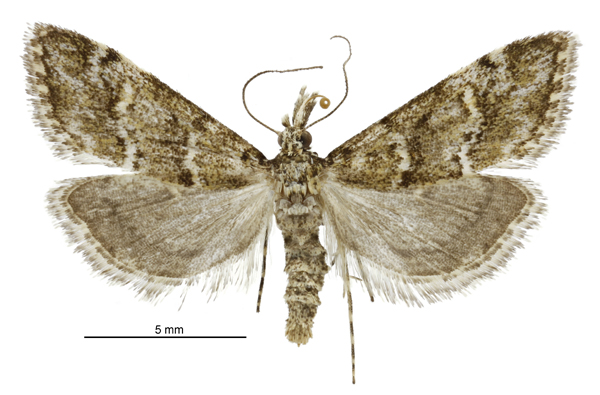
- female

Scientific classification
- Kingdom: Animalia
- Phylum: Arthropoda
- Clade: Pancrustacea
- Class: Insecta
- Order: Lepidoptera
- Family: Crambidae
- Genus: Culladia
- Species: C. strophaea

Binomial name
- Culladia strophaea (Meyrick, 1905)

Synonyms
- Argyria strophaea Meyrick, 1905; Metasia strophaea (Meyrick, 1905)

= Culladia strophaea =

Species of moth

Culladia strophaea is a species of moth in the family Crambidae. It is endemic to New Zealand. The taxonomy of this species is currently uncertain.

== Taxonomy ==
This species was first described by Edward Meyrick in 1905 as Argyria strophaea using specimens collected in Wellington by George Hudson. Hudson discussed and illustrated the species under this name in his 1928 book The Butterflies and Moths of New Zealand. The lectotype of this species is held at the Natural History Museum, London.

In 1973 D. E. Gaskin placed A. strophaea within the genus Culladia. This placement is currently under debate and is regarded by some scientists as erroneous. As a result, this species is also referred to as Argyria (s.l.) strophaea or alternatively by its original name despite the later also being regarded as erroneous.

== Description ==
Meyrick described this species as follows:

♂︎♀︎. 15-18 mm. Head and thorax ochreous-whitish, partially yellowish-tinged, and sprinkled with dark grey. Palpi 4, grey, darker-sprinkled, whitish above and towards base beneath. Antennae ochreous-whitish, obscurely ringed with dark fuscous. Abdomen ochreous-whitish irrorated with dark grey. Fore-wings elongate-triangular, costa gently arched, apex obtuse, termen slightly rounded, oblique, faintly waved; pale brassy-ochreous, suffusedly mixed with white, and irrorated with dark grey; subbasal line white, edged anteriorly with dark fuscous, angulated near costa, obsolete towards dorsum; first and second lines white, more or less edged with dark fuscous, first obtusely angulated above middle, second sinuate inwards towards dorsum, preceded on costa by a small dark fuscous spot; a small roundish dark fuscous spot in disc before middle; a narrow white transverse mark in disc beyond middle; a terminal series of dark fuscous lunulate marks: cilia whitish, with a fuscous subapical Hue, basal half barred with fuscous. Hind-wings grey, darker posteriorly; cilia as in fore-wings.

== Distribution ==
This species is endemic to New Zealand. This species can be found in the North Island as well as in the provinces of Nelson and Westland in the South Island. Other than the type locality of Wellington, this species has also been found at Whakarewarewa, Raurimu, Whanganui, Haruru falls in the Bay of Islands, Lake Taupō, Bluff Hill in Napier, and at Lake Rotorua.

== Biology and behaviour ==
Larvae of this species have been found in soil. This species is on the wing in January. Specimens of this species have been collected with mercury vapour light traps and 15watt UV light traps. Alfred Philpott studied the male genitalia of this species in 1929.

== Host species and habitat ==
It frequents stony cuttings, often by roadsides, near forest habitat.
