= National Park railway station, New Zealand =

Railway station in New Zealand

National Park
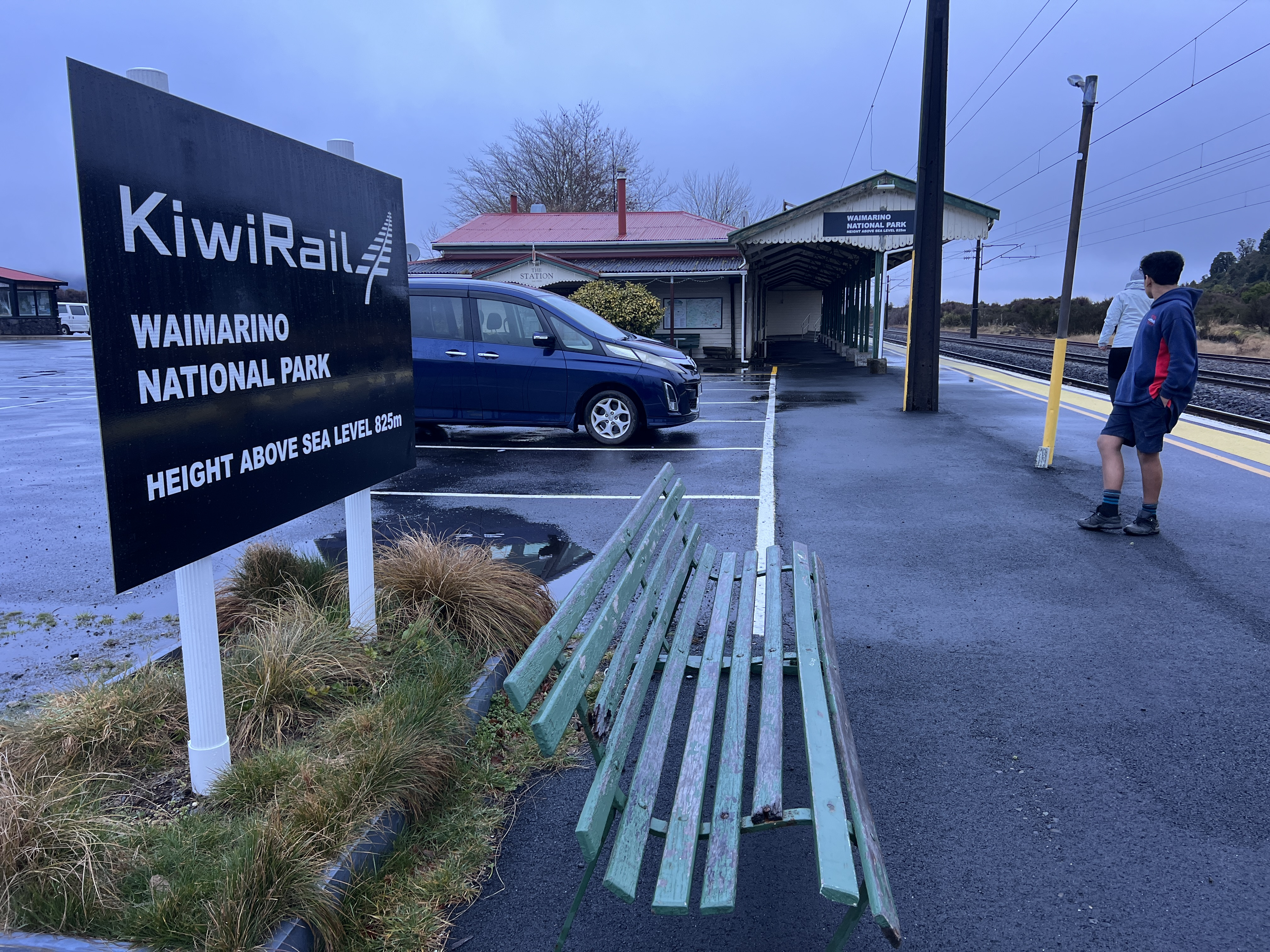
- National Park railway station, 2023

General information
- Location: Findlay Street, National Park, Ruapehu District; New Zealand
- Coordinates: 39°10′33″S 175°23′35″E
- Elevation: 807 m (2,648 ft)
- Owner: KiwiRail
- Line: North Island Main Trunk
- Distance: Wellington 346.83 km (215.51 mi)

History
- Opened: 9 November 1908
- Former names: Waimarino until 2 May 1926

Services
Preceding station	Great Journeys New Zealand	Following station
Taumarunui towards Auckland Strand	Northern Explorer	Ohakune towards Wellington

Other services
Preceding station	Historical railways	Following station
Raurimu; Line open, station closed 11.58 km (7.20 mi)	North Island Main Trunk; KiwiRail	Erua; Line open, station closed 6.67 km (4.14 mi)
Location

National Park railway station, originally Waimarino railway station (and alternatively Waimarino National Park), is a station on the North Island Main Trunk which serves the area around the town of National Park in New Zealand's Ruapehu District. It is served by KiwiRail's Northern Explorer long distance train between Wellington and Auckland. There is a licensed cafe on the platform.

At an elevation of 806.8 metres (2,647 ft), it was the country's highest station with a scheduled passenger stop (although the now-closed Waiouru railway station is higher). About 5 kilometres (3.1 mi) north of the station the railway performs the convoluted dance that is the Raurimu Spiral, one of New Zealand's most impressive feats of engineering.

There was a minor collision in 2007, when one Overlander train reversed into the other.

Scheduled passenger services to Waimarino National Park railway station were suspended from December 2021 to 25 September 2022.

== History ==
The Waimarino railway station was established in 1908 and two years later the Town of Waimarino was surveyed around the station. In 1925 the railway station's name was changed due to confusion with the Waimarino electorate and Waimarino County and to capitalise on the station's proximity to the Tongariro National Park. As other national parks were established in New Zealand mail and freight was incorrectly sent to the National Park railway station and town, this led to a formal proposal in 1957 to change the station's name but this suggestion was rejected. In 2023 a proposal was put forward to the board to change the station name to Waimarino, but this proposal was rejected.

Plans for the station were approved in 1901 and a 4th class station of 90 ft (27 m) by 17 ft (5.2 m) was built by March 1908, with rooms for a stationmaster, luggage, urinals and ladies. The 240 ft (73 m) by 15 ft (4.6 m) platform was extended to 300 ft (91 m) by 1933, 429 ft (131 m) by 1949 and another 200 ft (61 m) at each end was added in 1955. In 1957 the platform height was 5 1/4 in (130 mm) to 9 1/2 in (240 mm) above rail level. Between 1959 and 1980 it was raised to 36 cm (14 in) above rail level, using pre-cast sections, at a cost of about £2,830. About 1930 a 110 ft (34 m) verandah was added to the station. From 1910 to 1940 there was a Post Office at the station, including a telephone from 1914. There was also a 40 ft (12 m) by 30 ft (9.1 m) goods shed with verandah, a loading bank, cattle and sheep yards, two 4,000 imp gal (18,000 L) water tanks and a cart approach. There was a tablet and fixed signals. Houses for railway staff and a stationmaster were built between 1908 and 1954. A crossing loop could take 80 wagons and a snowplough was kept at the station.

In the 1960s, National Park became the railhead for the heavy equipment and machinery for the Tongariro Power Scheme Development, with the pumice roads substantially upgraded to take the heavy traffic. The station was also upgraded in 1965, with a 20-ton gantry crane, 40-ton weighbridge, 5 cement silos and a 100 ft (30 m) by 50 ft (15 m) goods shed, built on 11 acres (4.5 ha) of newly drained wetland to the south east of the station. The problem of building on the wetland was also noted in 1911, 1943 and, in 1930, the loading bank was described as being in 'a rough state' after use during building of Chateau Tongariro. In 1949 348 ft (106 m) of drainpipes were laid when sidings were extended.

An engine reversing triangle was built in 1912 and remained in 1963, but was overgrown by 1973.

In August 2023, KiwiRail erected new signage at the Railway Station recognising the original name of Waimarino.

=== Logging ===
The opening of the Main Trunk Line in 1908 created a vast opportunity to log and mill the large trees in the native forests with 30 saw mills and associated bush tramways established in the National Park area alone. With the arrival of caterpillar tractors in the 1930s, the extraction process was accelerated with National Park station having one of the greatest throughputs of timber in New Zealand. Today, only one mill is still operating.

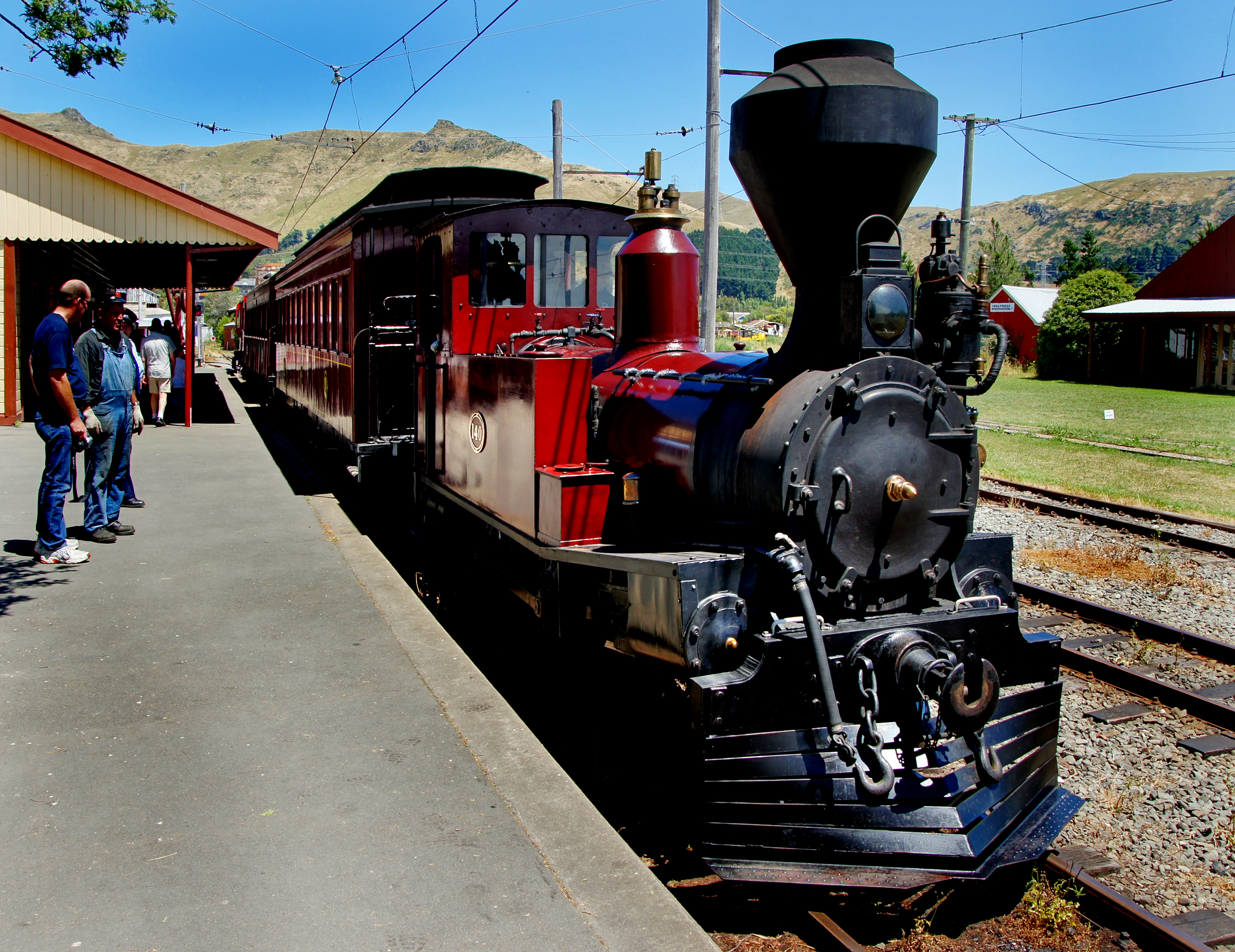
Cb Class 0-4+4-0 Geared Loco No. 113, which ran on the Marton Sash tramway from 1932 to 1948 and is now at Ferrymead

==== Marton Sash and Door Tramway ====
Marton Sash and Door Co had a tramway, which ran about 5 km (3.1 mi) south-west from the station. It was powered by an A & G Price 1924 Type Cb 0-4-4-0 from 1932 to 1948, which is now at Ferrymead. The mill opened in 1934. The line was still advertising for staff in 1945. The tramway became part of a 16 km (9.9 mi) cycleway in 2014.
