= Culladia paralyticus =

Scientific classification
- Kingdom: Animalia
- Phylum: Arthropoda
- Class: Insecta
- Order: Lepidoptera
- Family: Crambidae
- Genus: Culladia
- Species: C. paralyticus

Binomial name
- Culladia paralyticus (Meyrick, 1932)

Synonyms
- Crambus paralyticus Meyrick, 1932

Species of moth

Culladia paralyticus is a moth in the family Crambidae. It was described by Edward Meyrick in 1932. It is found on Fiji.
