= Culladia evae =

Scientific classification
- Domain: Eukaryota
- Kingdom: Animalia
- Phylum: Arthropoda
- Class: Insecta
- Order: Lepidoptera
- Family: Crambidae
- Genus: Culladia
- Species: C. evae

Binomial name
- Culladia evae Błeszyński, 1970

Species of moth

Culladia evae is a moth in the family Crambidae. It was described by Stanisław Błeszyński in 1970. It is found in the Philippines, Java, New Guinea, China (Hainan) and Palau.
