= Culladia yomii =

Scientific classification
- Domain: Eukaryota
- Kingdom: Animalia
- Phylum: Arthropoda
- Class: Insecta
- Order: Lepidoptera
- Family: Crambidae
- Genus: Culladia
- Species: C. yomii

Binomial name
- Culladia yomii Schouten, 1993

Species of moth

Culladia yomii is a moth in the family Crambidae. It was described by Schouten in 1993. It is found in Suriname.
