= Culladia inconspicuellus =

Scientific classification
- Kingdom: Animalia
- Phylum: Arthropoda
- Class: Insecta
- Order: Lepidoptera
- Family: Crambidae
- Genus: Culladia
- Species: C. inconspicuellus

Binomial name
- Culladia inconspicuellus (Snellen, 1872)

Synonyms
- Crambus inconspicuellus Snellen, 1872

Species of moth

Culladia inconspicuellus is a moth in the family Crambidae. It was described by Snellen in 1872. It is found in the Democratic Republic of Congo, as well as on La Réunion and Mauritius.
