= Culladia hastiferalis =

Scientific classification
- Kingdom: Animalia
- Phylum: Arthropoda
- Class: Insecta
- Order: Lepidoptera
- Family: Crambidae
- Genus: Culladia
- Species: C. hastiferalis

Binomial name
- Culladia hastiferalis (Walker, 1866)

Synonyms
- Scopula hastiferalis Walker, 1866

Species of moth

Culladia hastiferalis is a moth in the family Crambidae. It was described by Francis Walker in 1866. It is found on Borneo, Sumatra, Java, Sulawesi, the Moluccas, New Guinea, Taiwan, the Philippines (Luzon) and Australia, where it has been recorded from Northern Territory and Queensland.
