= Culladia tonkinella =

Scientific classification
- Domain: Eukaryota
- Kingdom: Animalia
- Phylum: Arthropoda
- Class: Insecta
- Order: Lepidoptera
- Family: Crambidae
- Genus: Culladia
- Species: C. tonkinella

Binomial name
- Culladia tonkinella Błeszyński, 1970

Species of moth

Culladia tonkinella is a moth in the family Crambidae. It was first described by Stanisław Błeszyński in 1970. It is found in Tonkin, and on Java and Sumatra.
