= Culladia troglodytellus =

Scientific classification
- Kingdom: Animalia
- Phylum: Arthropoda
- Class: Insecta
- Order: Lepidoptera
- Family: Crambidae
- Genus: Culladia
- Species: C. troglodytellus

Binomial name
- Culladia troglodytellus (Snellen, 1872)

Synonyms
- Crambus troglodytellus Snellen, 1872

Species of moth

Culladia troglodytellus is a moth in the family Crambidae. It was described by Snellen in 1872. It is found in the Democratic Republic of Congo, Gabon, Ivory Coast, La Réunion, Mauritius and Nigeria.
