= Raurimu =

Settlement in Manawatū-Whanganui Region, New Zealand

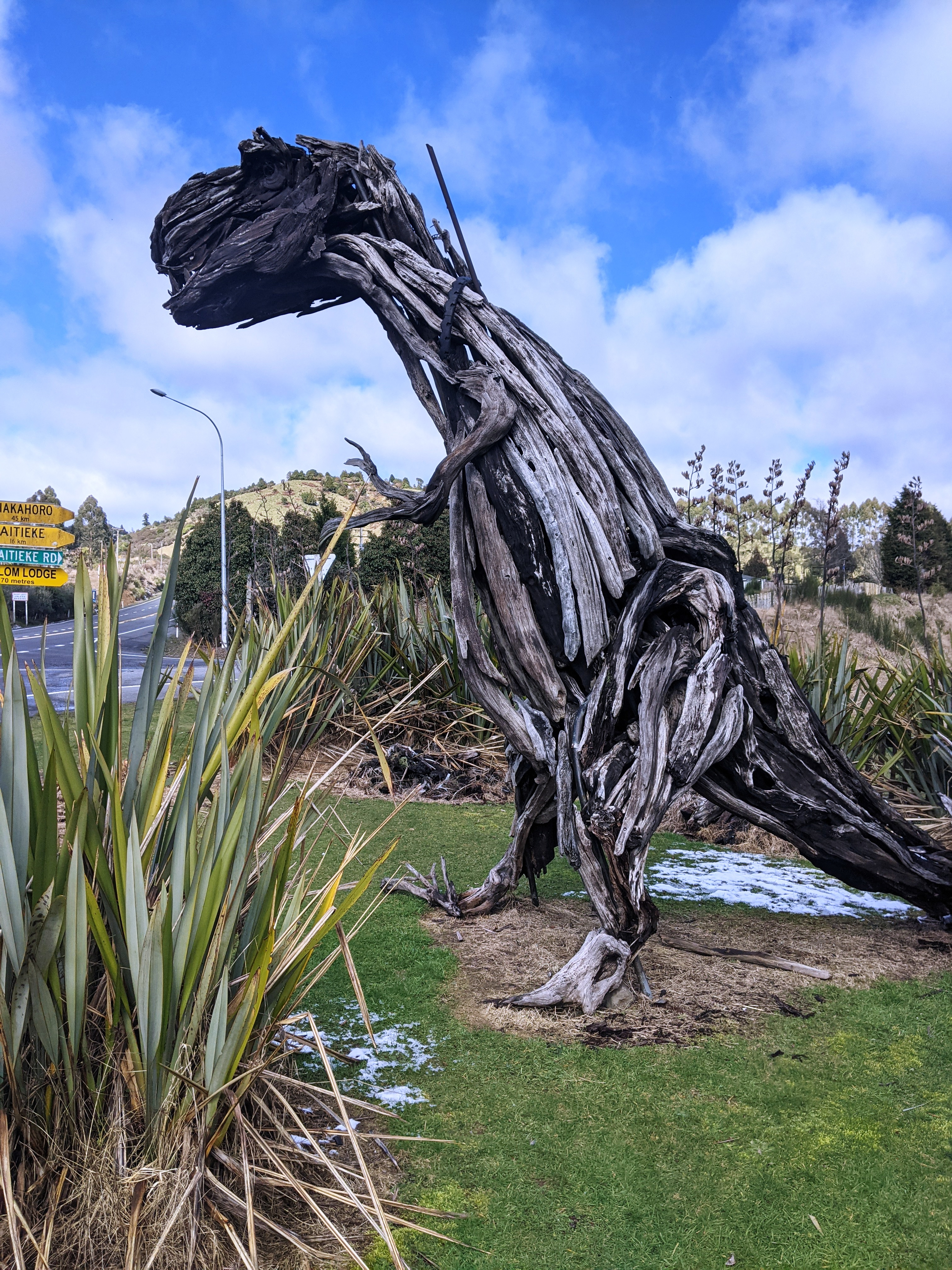
- T-rex sculpture made of driftwood
- Interactive map of Raurimu
- Coordinates: 39.124°S 175.392°E
- Country: New Zealand
- Region: Manawatū-Whanganui
- District: Ruapehu District
- Ward: Ruapehu General Ward; Ruapehu Māori Ward
- Community: Ōwhango-National Park Community
- Electorate: Whanganui; Te Tai Hauāuru (Māori)

Government
  - Territorial Authority: Ruapehu District Council
  - Regional council: Horizons Regional Council
  - Mayor of Ruapehu: Weston Kirton
  - Whanganui MP: Carl Bates
  - Te Tai Hauāuru MP: Debbie Ngarewa-Packer

Area
  - Total: 0.88 km^{2} (0.34 sq mi)

Population (June 2025)
  - Total: 90
  - Density: 100/km^{2} (260/sq mi)

Raurimu is a settlement in Ruapehu District, New Zealand. State Highway 4 passes through it, and the North Island Main Trunk railway line runs to the east. The Raurimu Spiral, which allows the railway to climb 139 metres, is described as an engineering masterpiece by the Institute of Professional Engineers of New Zealand.

Raurimu railway station served the town from 1906 until its closure in 1978.

A life-size driftwood sculpture of a Tyrannosaurus rex stands at the corner of Keitieke Road and State Highway 4.

== Demographics ==
Raurimu is described by Statistics New Zealand as a rural settlement. It covers 0.88 km^{2} (0.34 sq mi) and had an estimated population of 90 as of June 2025, with a population density of 102 people per km^{2}. It is part of the larger National Park statistical area.

Historical population
Year	Pop.	±% p.a.
2006	63	—
2013	63	+0.00%
2018	69	+1.84%
2023	84	+4.01%

Raurimu had a population of 84 in the 2023 New Zealand census, an increase of 15 people (21.7%) since the 2018 census, and an increase of 21 people (33.3%) since the 2013 census. There were 48 males and 36 females in 36 dwellings. 3.6% of people identified as LGBTIQ+. The median age was 43.1 years (compared with 38.1 years nationally). There were 18 people (21.4%) aged under 15 years, 12 (14.3%) aged 15 to 29, 39 (46.4%) aged 30 to 64, and 15 (17.9%) aged 65 or older.

People could identify as more than one ethnicity. The results were 96.4% European (Pākehā), 7.1% Māori, and 3.6% Asian. English was spoken by 100.0%, Māori by 3.6%, and other languages by 10.7%. No language could be spoken by 3.6% (e.g. too young to talk). The percentage of people born overseas was 21.4, compared with 28.8% nationally.

Religious affiliations were 42.9% Christian, 3.6% New Age, and 3.6% other religions. People who answered that they had no religion were 46.4%, and 7.1% of people did not answer the census question.

Of those at least 15 years old, 15 (22.7%) people had a bachelor's or higher degree, 36 (54.5%) had a post-high school certificate or diploma, and 15 (22.7%) people exclusively held high school qualifications. The median income was $35,600, compared with $41,500 nationally. 3 people (4.5%) earned over $100,000 compared to 12.1% nationally. The employment status of those at least 15 was 33 (50.0%) full-time, 9 (13.6%) part-time, and 3 (4.5%) unemployed.
