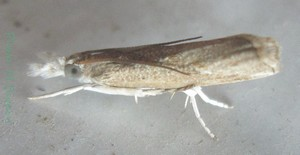

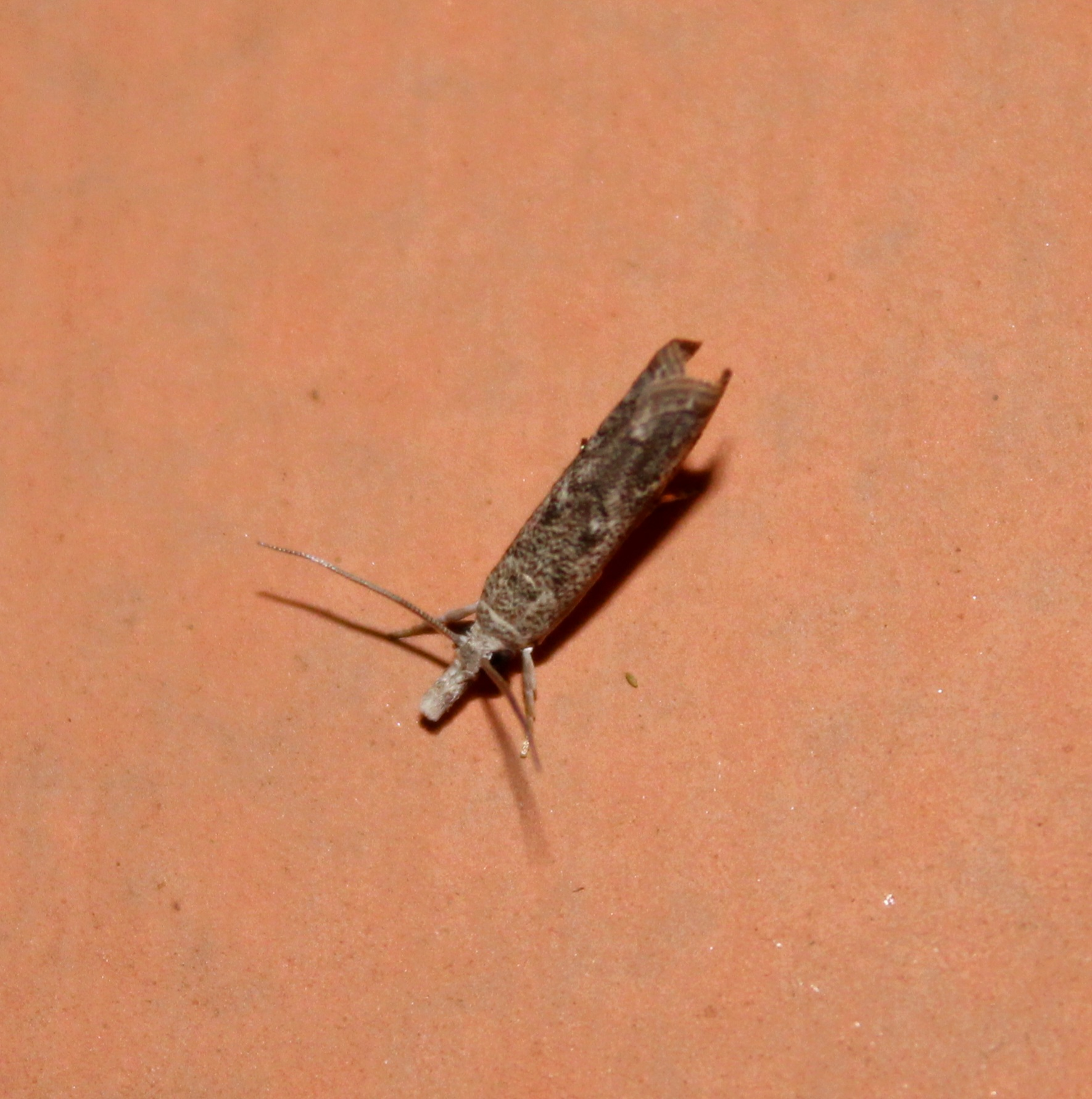

Scientific classification
- Kingdom: Animalia
- Phylum: Arthropoda
- Clade: Pancrustacea
- Class: Insecta
- Order: Lepidoptera
- Family: Crambidae
- Tribe: Crambini
- Genus: Culladia; Moore, 1886

Synonyms
- Araxes Walker, 1863; Crambidion Mabille, 1900; Nirmaladia Rose, 1983

= Culladia =

Genus of moths

Culladia is a grass moth genus (family Crambidae) of subfamily Crambinae, tribe Crambini. Some authors have assigned the synonymous taxon Nirmaladia to the snout moth family (Pyralidae), where all grass moths were once also included, but this seems to be in error.

== Description ==
Palpi porrect (extending forward), thickly scaled and extending about twice the length of head. Maxillary palpi triangularly scaled. Frons rounded. Antennae of male somewhat thickened and flattened. Spurs long and equal. Forewings long and narrow. Vein 3 from angle of cell and vein 6 from below upper angle. Vein 7 absent, and veins 8 and 9 stalked. Vein 10 and 11 free. Hindwings with vein 3 from near angle of cell. veins 6 and 7 from upper angle and vein 7 anastomosing (fusing) with vein 8.

== Species ==
- Culladia achroellum (Mabille, 1900)
- Culladia admigratella (Walker, 1863)
- Culladia assamella Błeszyński, 1970
- Culladia cuneiferellus (Walker, 1863)
- Culladia dentilinealis Hampson, 1919
- Culladia elgonella Błeszyński, 1970
- Culladia evae Błeszyński, 1970
- Culladia hanna Błeszyński, 1970
- Culladia hastiferalis (Walker, 1866)
- Culladia inconspicuellus (Snellen, 1872)
- Culladia miria Błeszyński, 1970
- Culladia paralyticus (Meyrick, 1932)
- Culladia serranella Błeszyński, 1970
- Culladia strophaea (Meyrick, 1905)
- Culladia suffusella Hampson, 1896
- Culladia tonkinella Błeszyński, 1970
- Culladia troglodytellus (Snellen, 1872)
- Culladia yomii Schouten, 1993
- Culladia zhengi Li & Li, 2011
