= Culladia elgonella =

Scientific classification
- Domain: Eukaryota
- Kingdom: Animalia
- Phylum: Arthropoda
- Class: Insecta
- Order: Lepidoptera
- Family: Crambidae
- Genus: Culladia
- Species: C. elgonella

Binomial name
- Culladia elgonella Błeszyński, 1970

Species of moth

Culladia elgonella is a moth in the family Crambidae. It was described by Stanisław Błeszyński in 1970. It is found in Kenya.
