= Bush tramway =

Industrial tramway, mostly for logging

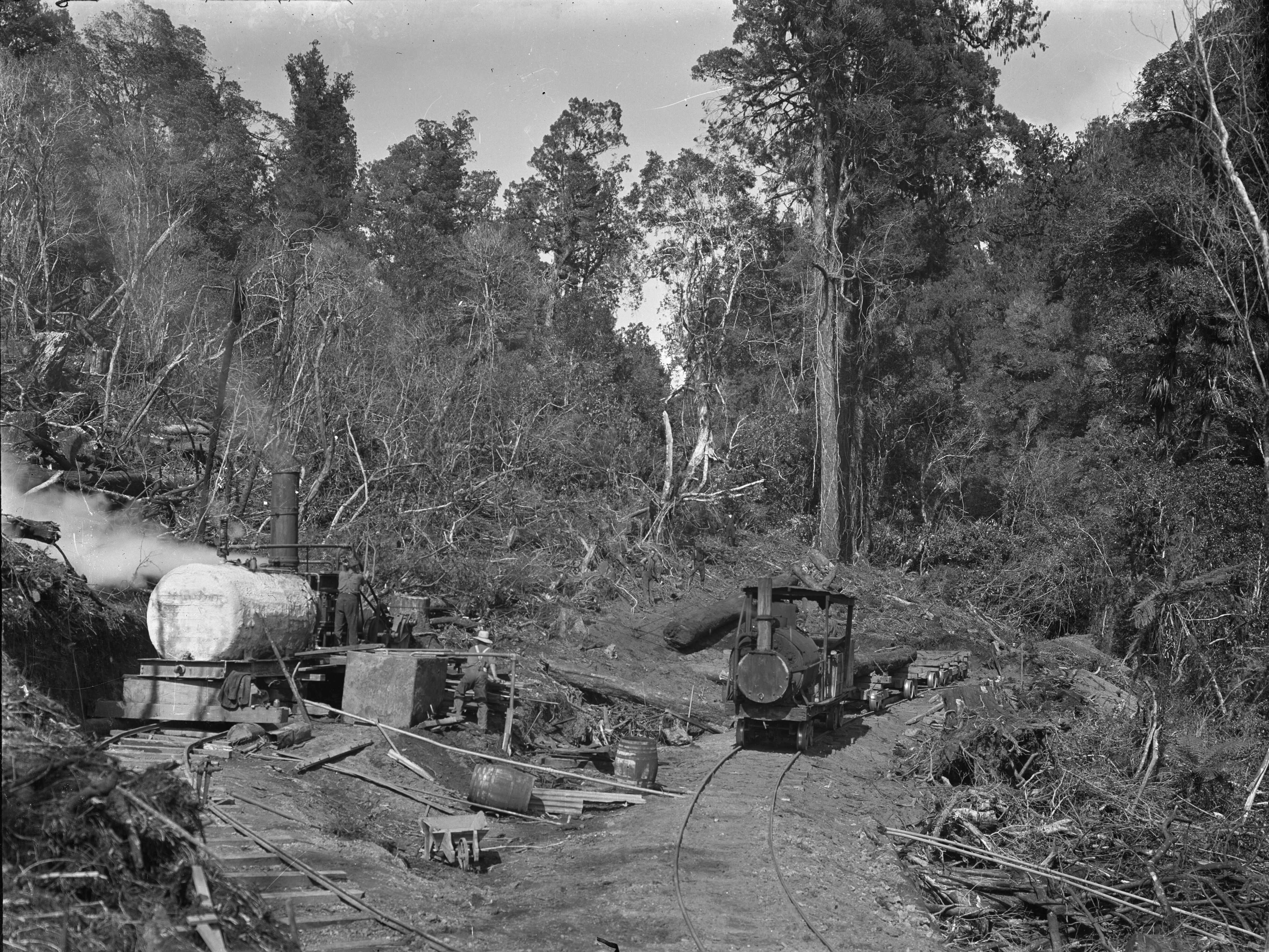
A bush tram and line-side log hauler owned by the Tamaki Sawmill Co., Raurimu. Photographed by Albert Percy Godber circa 1917.

In New Zealand railway terminology, a bush tramway is an industrial tramway, most commonly used for logging. They are distinguished from urban trams as bush tramways were predominantly for freight, usually logging in the bush, and not for passengers, and were often built in parts of the countryside that were otherwise inaccessible to transport. In some cases, such as the Kinleith Branch, bush tramways were converted to heavy rail and incorporated into the New Zealand Government Railways network. In modern parlance, both urban trams and bush tramways are known as light rail.

== History ==
Although legally defined as a railway, the Dun Mountain Railway was the first industrial tramway in New Zealand, opening in 1862. The line used horses to haul mineral wagons from Dun Mountain to the port of Nelson. "Bush tram" was first used to describe the horse-drawn tramway from Greymouth to the banks of the Taramakau River, which opened in 1867.

== Motive power ==
Bush tramways initially made use of horses and in some cases log haulers (stationary steam engines pulling wagons by chain or rope) alongside tramway tracks for motive power. As tramways grew longer, steam locomotives were used, usually geared locomotives.

Following the Second World War, the New Zealand Forestry Service banned steam locomotives in native bush, and there was a rush to replace steam locomotives with diesel or petrol alternatives.

== See also ==
- Bush Tramway Club
- Forest railway
- Rail transport in New Zealand
- Trams in New Zealand
- West coast trams in New Zealand
