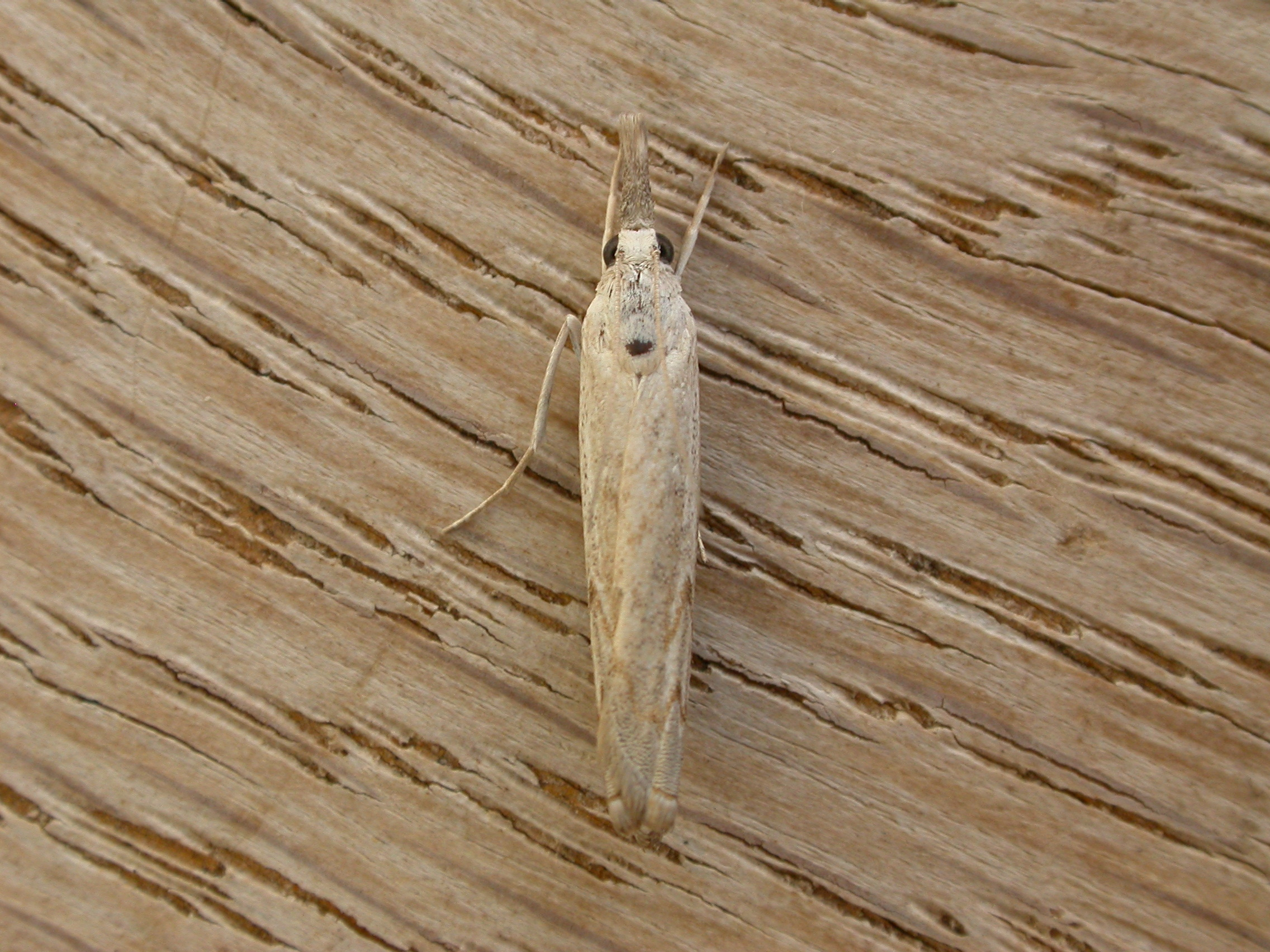

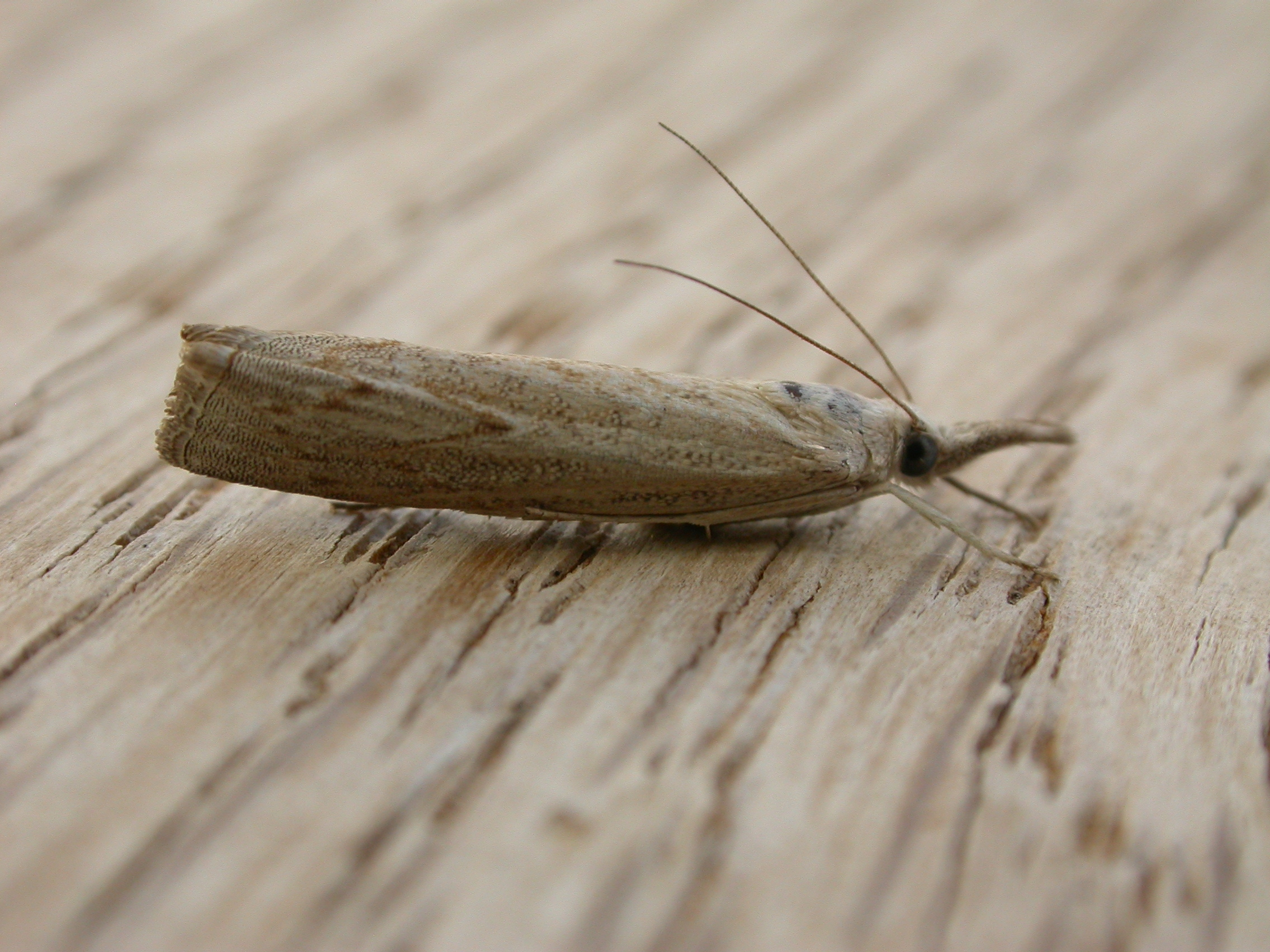

Scientific classification
- Kingdom: Animalia
- Phylum: Arthropoda
- Class: Insecta
- Order: Lepidoptera
- Family: Crambidae
- Genus: Culladia
- Species: C. cuneiferellus

Binomial name
- Culladia cuneiferellus (Walker, 1863)

Synonyms
- Crambus cuneiferellus Walker, 1863

= Culladia cuneiferellus =

Species of moth

Culladia cuneiferellus is a species of the family Crambidae in the genus Culladia. It was described by Francis Walker in 1863. It is found in Australia (Queensland, New South Wales and Tasmania), New Caledonia, Norfolk Island, the New Hebrides and the Loyalty Islands. It is also present in New Zealand.

The wingspan is about 10 mm.

The larvae feed on various grasses, including Cynodon dactylon and are considered a pest on lawns and pastures.
