= National Park, New Zealand =

Settlement in Manawatū-Whanganui Region, New Zealand

National Park Waimarino
- Village
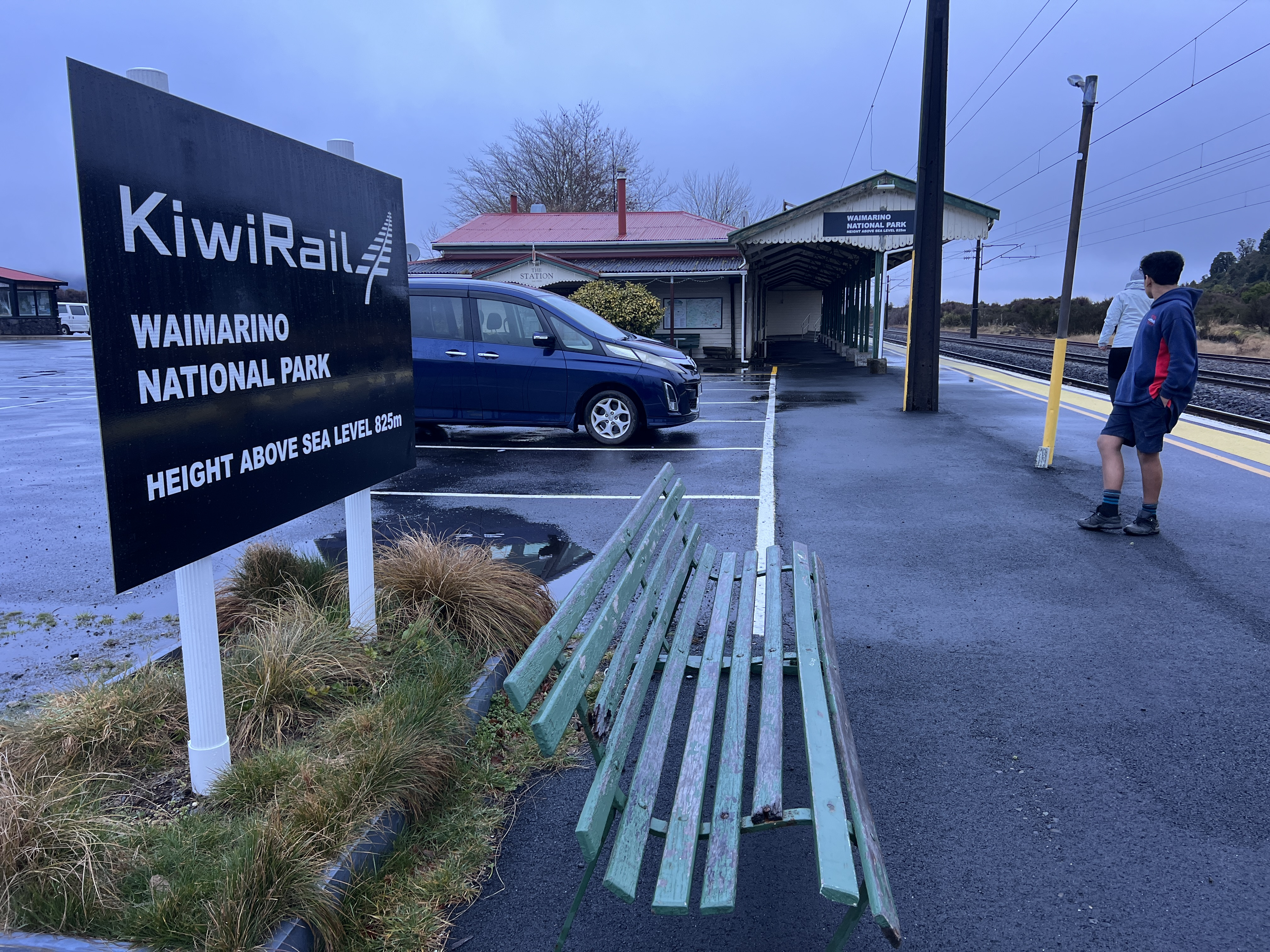
- National Park railway station
- Interactive map of National Park
- Coordinates: 39°10′25″S 175°23′50″E
- Country: New Zealand
- Region: Manawatū-Whanganui
- District: Ruapehu District
- Ward: Ruapehu General Ward; Ruapehu Māori Ward
- Community: Ōwhango-National Park Community
- Named for: Proximity to Tongariro National Park
- Electorates: Whanganui; Te Tai Hauāuru (Māori)

Government
  - Territorial Authority: Ruapehu District Council
  - Regional council: Horizons Regional Council
  - Mayor of Ruapehu: Weston Kirton
  - Whanganui MP: Carl Bates
  - Te Tai Hauāuru MP: Debbie Ngarewa-Packer

Area
  - Total: 0.81 km^{2} (0.31 sq mi)

Population (June 2025)
  - Total: 270
  - Density: 330/km^{2} (860/sq mi)
- Postcode: 3948
- Area code: 07

National Park, officially Waimarino and also known as National Park Village, is a small town on the North Island Central Plateau in New Zealand. Formerly known as National Park Village, it is the highest urban township in New Zealand, at 825 metres.

== Toponymy ==
The Waimarino railway station was established in 1908 and two years later the Town of Waimarino was surveyed around the station; however, it was not until 1925 that it developed into a proper town. In 1925-1926 the railway station's name was changed due to confusion with the Waimarino electorate and Waimarino County and to capitalise on the station's proximity to the Tongariro National Park. Eventually the name National Park started to be applied to the town and eventually overtook the name Waimarino. As other national parks were established in New Zealand mail and freight was incorrectly sent to the National Park railway station and town, this led to a formal proposal from the National Parks Authority to the New Zealand Geographic Board in 1957 to change the station's name. There was also a 1959 proposal from Federated Mountain Clubs to change the name of the town, but both of these suggestions were rejected. The National Parks Authority again proposed in 1967-68 to change the name of the town to Waimarino but this was rejected by the board because of opposition from locals. The name National Park was never formally gazetted as the official name of the town. In 2023 a further proposal was put to the board to change the name to Waimarino. The board announced that they supported the proposal and held a public consultation process. The proposal had more supports than opposes but the majority of residents of the town signed a petition opposing the change. (Note: This opposition is only counted as a single oppose as it was presented as a petition) Following the consultation period, the board requested the Minister for Land Information, Chris Penk to make the final decision. In 2024 the name of the town was officially changed from National Park to Waimarino, but the name of the railway station was left unchanged as National Park Railway Station.

== History ==
The North Island Main Trunk line was completed in 1908, enabling a major expansion of logging of native forests in the central North Island. Bush tramways were constructed, and around 30 saw mills were established in the National Park area. Crawler tractors were used from the 1930s, leading to an expansion of logging. The National Park Railway Station had amongst the highest volume of timber handled in New Zealand. The railway station served as the railhead for major equipment for the development of the Tongariro Power Scheme in the 1960s.

== Geography ==
=== Setting ===
National Park is a village on the western edge of Tongariro National Park in the central North Island. The town is located just outside the boundary of Tongariro National Park, New Zealand's first national park. It is sited next to the North Island Main Trunk railway line and close to the junction of State Highways 4 and 47, halfway between Ohakune and Taumarunui and 45 kilometres southwest of the southern shore of Lake Taupō. It is 20 minutes drive to the country's biggest skifields, Whakapapa and 50 minutes drive to Tūroa on the slopes of the active volcano, Mount Ruapehu. To the west is Whanganui National Park.

=== Climate ===
Under the Köppen-Geiger climate classification, National Park has an oceanic climate (Cfb). February is the warmest month, with an average temperature of 14.8 °C, while July is the coldest month with an average temperature of 4.5 °C. Due to an altitude of 822 metres, winters are cold, and generally winter afternoons stay below 10 °C. Frosts are common from May to September, although they can occur during the warmer months. Snow is also a common occurrence in the colder months, sometimes accumulating for several days on end. The summer temperatures are moderate due to the altitude of the village, resulting in cool nights and mild to warm days. The mountains around the village are popular for hiking and mountain biking during the summer. The summer afternoon temperatures often exceed 20 °C, and sometimes reaching 25 °C. The wettest month is July, with 225 mm of precipitation, while February is the driest, with an average of 115 mm, making the climate of National Park lean towards a cool-summer Mediterranean climate (Csb). Overall, the year-round average temperature is 9.6 °C.

Climate data for National Park, Manawatu-Whanganui, 822 m
Month	Jan	Feb	Mar	Apr	May	Jun	Jul	Aug	Sep	Oct	Nov	Dec	Year
Mean daily maximum °C (°F)	19.9 (67.8)	20.2 (68.4)	18.1 (64.6)	15.0 (59.0)	11.7 (53.1)	9.2 (48.6)	8.4 (47.1)	9.3 (48.7)	11.1 (52.0)	13.4 (56.1)	15.7 (60.3)	17.9 (64.2)	14.2 (57.6)
Daily mean °C (°F)	14.6 (58.3)	14.8 (58.6)	13.1 (55.6)	10.4 (50.7)	7.5 (45.5)	5.4 (41.7)	4.5 (40.1)	5.4 (41.7)	7.0 (44.6)	9.0 (48.2)	11.0 (51.8)	12.9 (55.2)	9.6 (49.3)
Mean daily minimum °C (°F)	9.3 (48.7)	9.4 (48.9)	8.2 (46.8)	5.8 (42.4)	3.4 (38.1)	1.7 (35.1)	0.7 (33.3)	1.5 (34.7)	3.0 (37.4)	4.7 (40.5)	6.3 (43.3)	8.0 (46.4)	5.2 (41.4)
Average rainfall mm (inches)	156 (6.1)	115 (4.5)	156 (6.1)	155 (6.1)	207 (8.1)	218 (8.6)	225 (8.9)	207 (8.1)	210 (8.3)	184 (7.2)	170 (6.7)	188 (7.4)	2,191 (86.3)
Source: Climate-data.org

== Governance ==
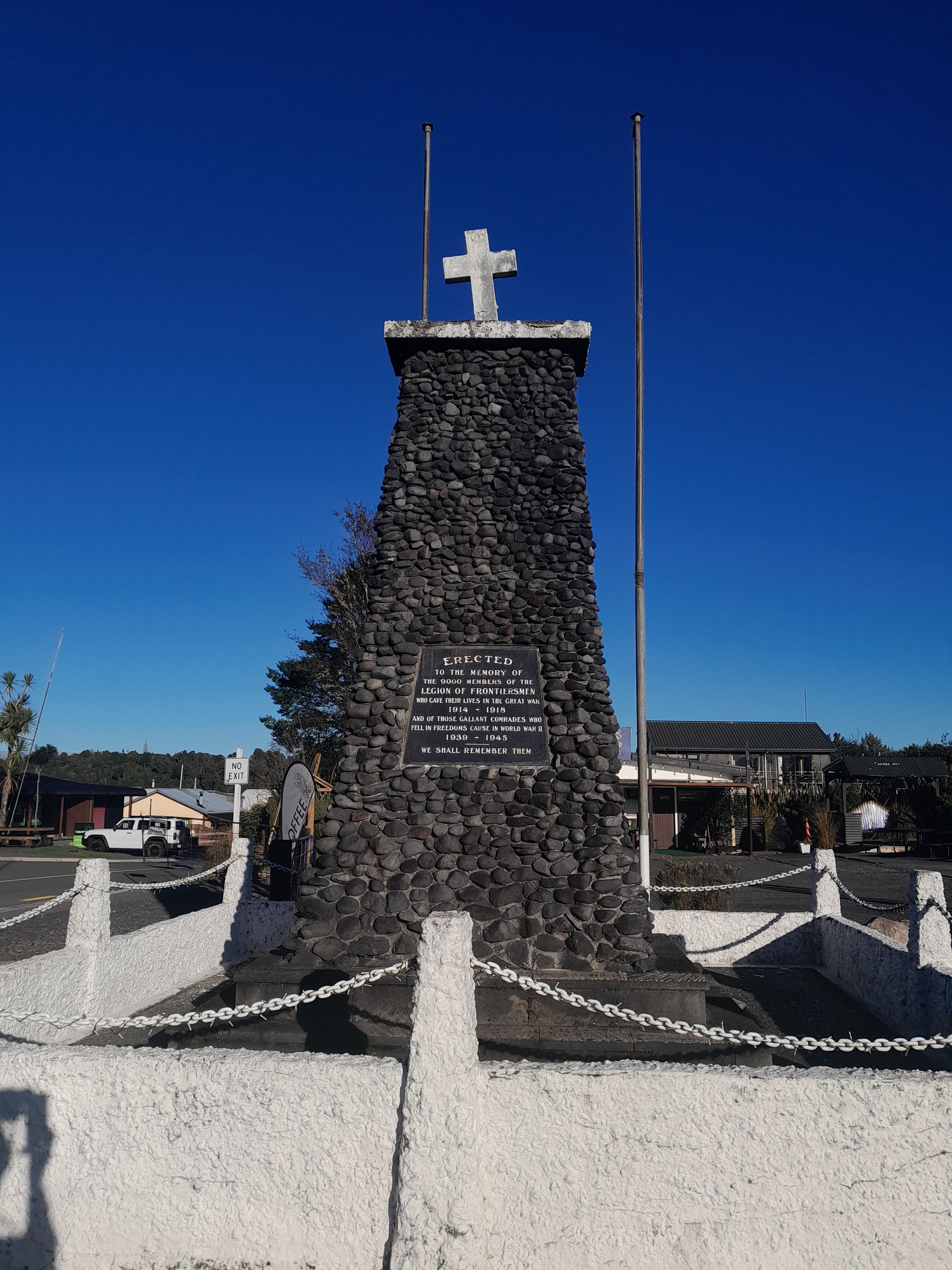
War memorial, National Park (2025)

The town is administered by the Ruapehu District Council. The Ōwhango-National Park Community Board (ONPCB) comprises five elected community representatives and one appointed councillor from the Ruapehu District Council. On a national level, National Park is part of the Rangitīkei general electorate and the Te Tai Hauāuru Māori electorate.

== Demographics ==
National Park is described by Statistics New Zealand as a rural settlement. It covers 0.81 km^{2} (0.31 sq mi) and had an estimated population of 270 as of June 2025, with a population density of 333 people per km^{2}. It is part of the larger National Park statistical area.

Historical population for the settlement
Year	Pop.	±% p.a.
2006	240	—
2013	174	−4.49%
2018	213	+4.13%
2023	240	+2.42%
The 2006 population is for a larger area of 0.89 km^{2}. Source:

National Park had a population of 240 in the 2023 New Zealand census, an increase of 27 people (12.7%) since the 2018 census, and an increase of 66 people (37.9%) since the 2013 census. There were 120 males and 117 females in 168 dwellings. 3.8% of people identified as LGBTIQ+. The median age was 38.4 years (compared with 38.1 years nationally). There were 39 people (16.2%) aged under 15 years, 51 (21.2%) aged 15 to 29, 120 (50.0%) aged 30 to 64, and 30 (12.5%) aged 65 or older.

People could identify as more than one ethnicity. The results were 73.8% European (Pākehā); 30.0% Māori; 3.8% Pasifika; 7.5% Asian; 1.2% Middle Eastern, Latin American and African New Zealanders (MELAA); and 2.5% other, which includes people giving their ethnicity as "New Zealander". English was spoken by 97.5%, Māori by 6.2%, and other languages by 16.2%. No language could be spoken by 1.2% (e.g. too young to talk). The percentage of people born overseas was 30.0, compared with 28.8% nationally.

Religious affiliations were 28.8% Christian, 1.2% Hindu, 2.5% Māori religious beliefs, 1.2% Buddhist, 2.5% New Age, and 1.2% other religions. People who answered that they had no religion were 57.5%, and 6.2% of people did not answer the census question.

Of those at least 15 years old, 42 (20.9%) people had a bachelor's or higher degree, 96 (47.8%) had a post-high school certificate or diploma, and 63 (31.3%) people exclusively held high school qualifications. The median income was $34,700, compared with $41,500 nationally. 9 people (4.5%) earned over $100,000 compared to 12.1% nationally. The employment status of those at least 15 was 114 (56.7%) full-time, 30 (14.9%) part-time, and 6 (3.0%) unemployed.

=== National Park statistical area ===
National Park statistical area, which also includes Ōwhango and Raurimu, covers 1,375.29 km^{2} (531.00 sq mi) and had an estimated population of 1,200 as of June 2025, with a population density of 0.87 people per km^{2}.

Historical population for the statistical area
Year	Pop.	±% p.a.
2006	1,131	—
2013	1,065	−0.86%
2018	1,050	−0.28%
2023	1,131	+1.50%

National Park had a population of 1,131 in the 2023 New Zealand census, an increase of 81 people (7.7%) since the 2018 census, and an increase of 66 people (6.2%) since the 2013 census. There were 579 males, 549 females, and 3 people of other genders in 609 dwellings. 2.7% of people identified as LGBTIQ+. The median age was 43.4 years (compared with 38.1 years nationally). There were 204 people (18.0%) aged under 15 years, 177 (15.6%) aged 15 to 29, 543 (48.0%) aged 30 to 64, and 207 (18.3%) aged 65 or older.

People could identify as more than one ethnicity. The results were 83.3% European (Pākehā); 23.6% Māori; 1.9% Pasifika; 2.7% Asian; 0.5% Middle Eastern, Latin American and African New Zealanders (MELAA); and 3.7% other, which includes people giving their ethnicity as "New Zealander". English was spoken by 97.9%, Māori by 5.8%, Samoan by 0.3%, and other languages by 8.0%. No language could be spoken by 1.6% (e.g. too young to talk). New Zealand Sign Language was known by 0.3%. The percentage of people born overseas was 15.6, compared with 28.8% nationally.

Religious affiliations were 26.0% Christian, 0.3% Hindu, 3.7% Māori religious beliefs, 0.3% Buddhist, 1.1% New Age, and 1.3% other religions. People who answered that they had no religion were 58.4%, and 9.3% of people did not answer the census question.

Of those at least 15 years old, 156 (16.8%) people had a bachelor's or higher degree, 516 (55.7%) had a post-high school certificate or diploma, and 246 (26.5%) people exclusively held high school qualifications. The median income was $36,800, compared with $41,500 nationally. 51 people (5.5%) earned over $100,000 compared to 12.1% nationally. The employment status of those at least 15 was 477 (51.5%) full-time, 159 (17.2%) part-time, and 18 (1.9%) unemployed.

== Economy ==
Tourism is its main industry, with 1,500 visitor beds in commercial accommodation and private chalets. In the summer the village is a popular base for Tongariro and Whanganui National Park for hiking, biking and kayaking. Transport leaves National Park daily (weather permitting) for the Tongariro Alpine Crossing, known as the best one day alpine trek in New Zealand.

== Transport ==
KiwiRail's Northern Explorer scheduled passenger service stops at the National Park Railway Station on its journey between Auckland and Wellington. To the northwest of the town, the railway line traverses the Raurimu Spiral, one of New Zealand's notable engineering heritage sites.

== Education ==
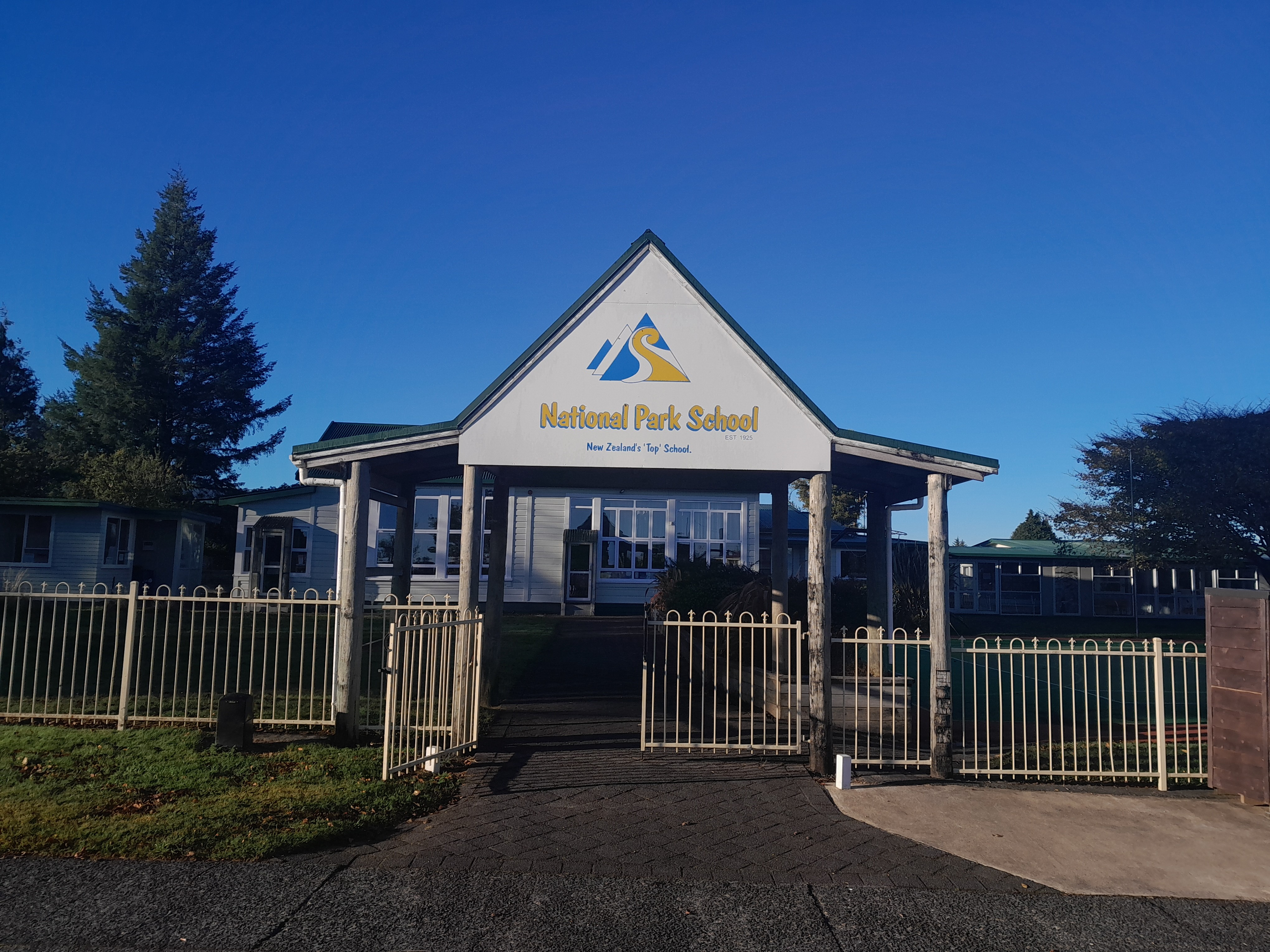
National Park School, established 1925

National Park School is a co-educational state primary school for Year 1 to 8 students, with a roll of 32 as of July 2026. The school opened in 1925 as Waimarino School and became National Park School in 1954. Its fortunes have fluctuated with the cycles of activity in the area. Today, it is thriving with a more stable population and the establishment of its Ski Elite programme whereby pupils can take up residence in the village for the winter combining studies with skiing and snowboarding development programmes.
