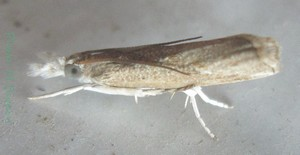

Scientific classification
- Kingdom: Animalia
- Phylum: Arthropoda
- Clade: Pancrustacea
- Class: Insecta
- Order: Lepidoptera
- Family: Crambidae
- Genus: Culladia
- Species: C. achroellum

Binomial name
- Culladia achroellum (Mabille, 1900)

Synonyms
- Crambidion achroellum Mabille, 1900

= Culladia achroellum =

Species of moth

Culladia achroellum is a species of grass moth of the family Crambidae. It is found in Africa from Sudan to South Africa and on the Indian Ocean islands.

It's got a length of approx. 9–10 mm and a wingspan of 18–20 mm.
