= Culladia dentilinealis =

Scientific classification
- Kingdom: Animalia
- Phylum: Arthropoda
- Class: Insecta
- Order: Lepidoptera
- Family: Crambidae
- Genus: Culladia
- Species: C. dentilinealis

Binomial name
- Culladia dentilinealis Hampson, 1919

Species of moth

Culladia dentilinealis is a moth in the family Crambidae. It was described by George Hampson in 1919. It is found in the Punjab region of what was then India and in Nepal.
