= Culladia hanna =

Scientific classification
- Domain: Eukaryota
- Kingdom: Animalia
- Phylum: Arthropoda
- Class: Insecta
- Order: Lepidoptera
- Family: Crambidae
- Genus: Culladia
- Species: C. hanna

Binomial name
- Culladia hanna Błeszyński, 1970

Species of moth

Culladia hanna is a moth in the family Crambidae. It was described by Stanisław Błeszyński in 1970. It is found in New Guinea, New Britain, China (Hainan), Java, Sumatra, the St Matthias Islands and the Solomon Islands.
