= Robert Holmes (engineer) =

New Zealand civil engineer

Robert West Holmes ISO (25 September 1856 – 8 February 1936) was a New Zealand civil engineer. He was born on 25 September 1856 in London.

In the Public Works Department he was responsible for the construction of the North Island Main Trunk Railway from 1891 to 1899, during which he completed the gap in the middle of the North Island with the Raurimu Spiral. He retired in 1920, having been Engineer-in-Chief of the department from 1907 to 1920 (and Undersecretary for a period in 1920).
