= Culladia suffusella =

Scientific classification
- Kingdom: Animalia
- Phylum: Arthropoda
- Class: Insecta
- Order: Lepidoptera
- Family: Crambidae
- Genus: Culladia
- Species: C. suffusella

Binomial name
- Culladia suffusella Hampson, 1896

Species of moth

Culladia suffusella is a moth in the family Crambidae. It was described by George Hampson in 1896. It is found in India and the Philippines.
