= Culladia admigratella =

Scientific classification
- Kingdom: Animalia
- Phylum: Arthropoda
- Class: Insecta
- Order: Lepidoptera
- Family: Crambidae
- Genus: Culladia
- Species: C. admigratella

Binomial name
- Culladia admigratella (Walker, 1863)

Synonyms
- Araxes admigratella Walker, 1863

Species of moth

Culladia admigratella is a moth in the family Crambidae. It was described by Francis Walker in 1863. It has a wide range in the tropics, and has been recorded from the British Indian Ocean Territory, Kenya, Malawi, Mauritius, Nigeria, the Seychelles, Sierra Leone, Socotra, India, Myanmar, the Philippines, Sri Lanka and Sumatra.

== Description ==
Its wingspan is about 16 mm. Both wings with veins 4 and 5 stalked. Head and thorax white marked with fuscous. Palpi banded with fuscous. Abdomen pale fuscous. Forewings whitish with fuscous suffusion. There is an indistinct postmedial line running out to an angle on vein 5, retracted along vein 2 to below middle of the cell, then bent outwards again, the area beyond it whiter. An indistinct highly dentate submarginal line present. Hindwings whitish. The apical area tinged with fuscous.

The larvae feed on Eleusine indica and Panicum species.
