= Raurimu railway station =

Railway station in New Zealand

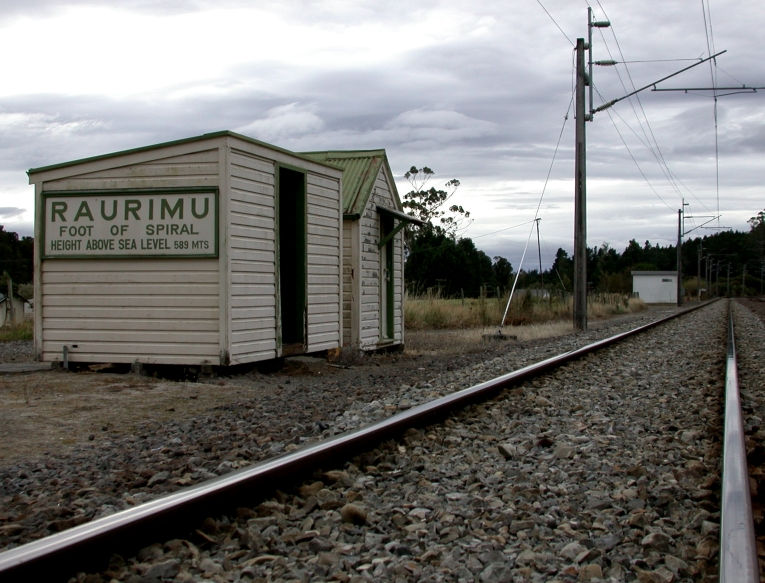
- Raurimu railway station

General information
- Location: New Zealand
- Coordinates: 39.11927°S 175.39654°E
- Elevation: 592 m (1,942 ft)
- Owner: KiwiRail
- Line: North Island Main Trunk
- Distance: Wellington 358.44 km (222.72 mi)
- Platforms: 1

History
- Opened: 13 December 1906
- Closed: 27 August 1978
- Rebuilt: 10 July 1977
- Electrified: 25 kV 50 Hz AC June 1988
- Former names: Pukerimu until 29 October 1906

Services
Preceding station	Historical railways	Following station
Oio; Line open, station closed 8.29 km (5.15 mi)	North Island Main Trunk; KiwiRail	National Park; Line open, station open 11.58 km (7.20 mi)
Location

Raurimu railway station was a station on the North Island Main Trunk, and in the Manawatū-Whanganui region.

It opened in 1906 and closed in 1978. It was known as Pukerimu from 1906 to 1908.

The Raurimu Spiral is 6.8 kilometres (4.2 mi) from the station, and rises 200 metres (660 ft) to the National Park railway station on the North Island Volcanic Plateau; on a direct line this would be a gradient of 1 in 24, but the Raurimu Spiral reduces the gradient to a (still steep) 1 in 52.

== History ==
In 1906 the administrative office of the northern section of the Public Works Department (PWD) which was building the NIMT was moved to a group of "tents and huts" at Raurimu, and at its zenith the Raurimu community numbered a thousand men, women and children.

Trains started running to Raurimu from 13 December 1906. From 10 May 1907 goods were carried to Raurimu by rail. Trains started running to the next station at Waimarino (now National Park) from 23 December 1907. The NIMT was opened to through Auckland to Wellington trains from 9 November 1908, though only southbound expresses stopped at Raurimu.

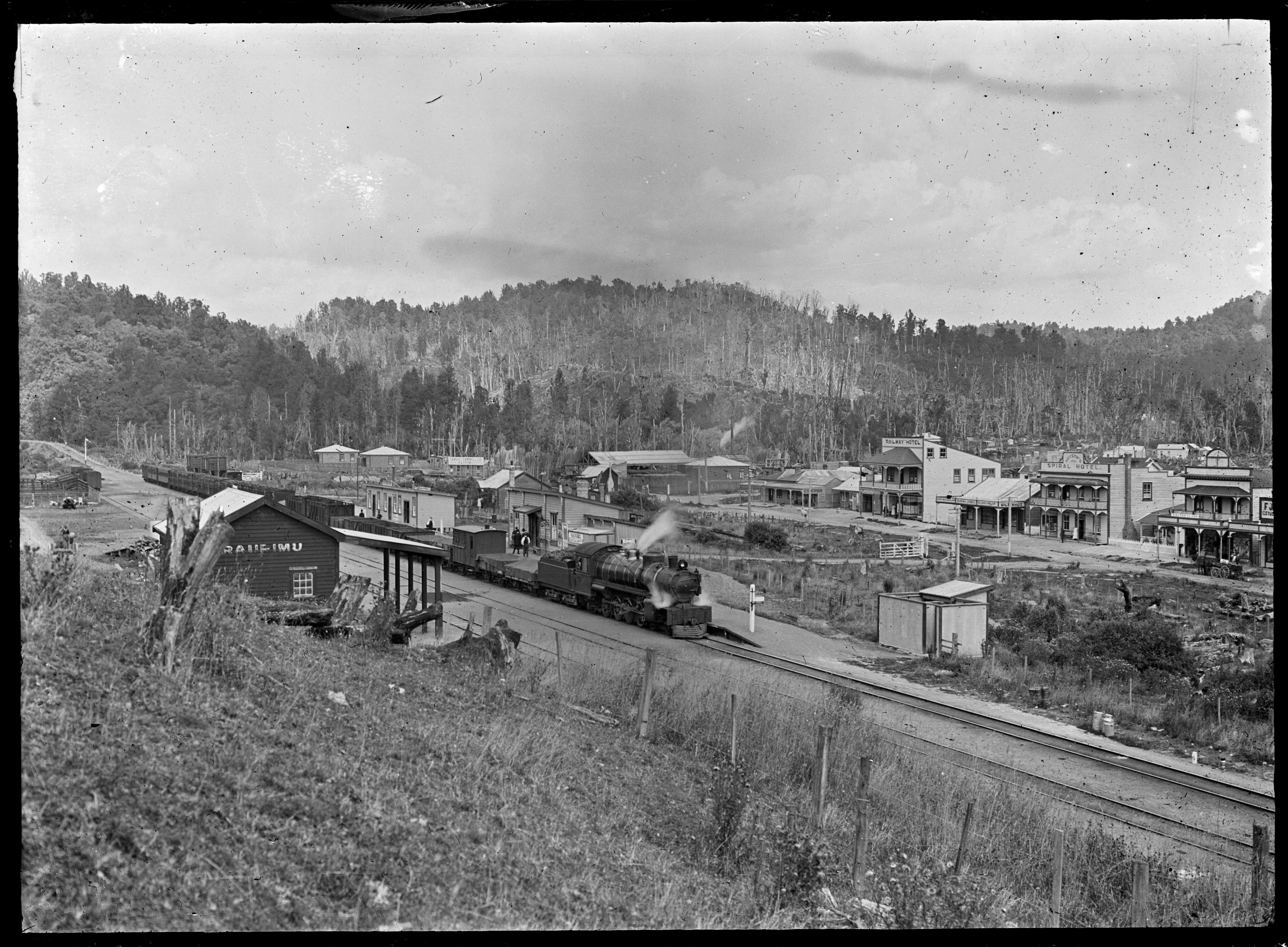
Raurimu railway station about 1917

A 51 feet (16 m) by 14 feet (4.3 m) 5th class station was built in 1906, with stationmaster's, lobby, and ladies rooms, a 200 feet (61 m) by 20 feet (6.1 m) platform, loading bank, cattle yards, 30 feet (9.1 m) by 20 feet (6.1 m) goods shed with verandah, privies, urinals, water tanks and passing loop for 58 wagons.

Raurimu closed to passengers before December 1975,

The settlement of Raurimu in the early 20th century had two bush tramways for forestry; Knight's tram, Raurimu of the Raumiru Sawmilling Co (1935-1957) and a tramway of the Pokata Timber Co (1930-1957).

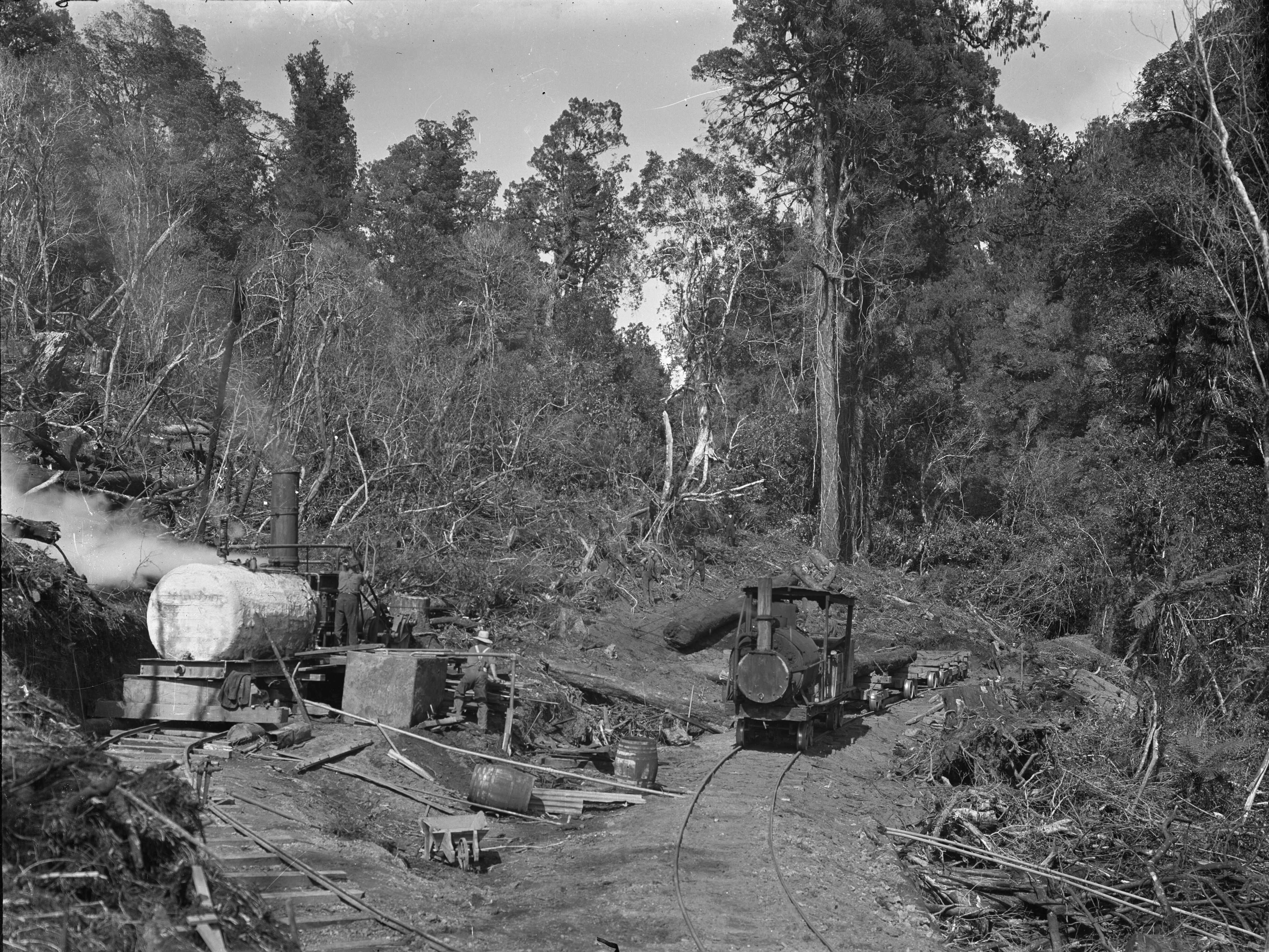
Knight's tram and a steam hauler, Raurimu, in a clearing in the bush

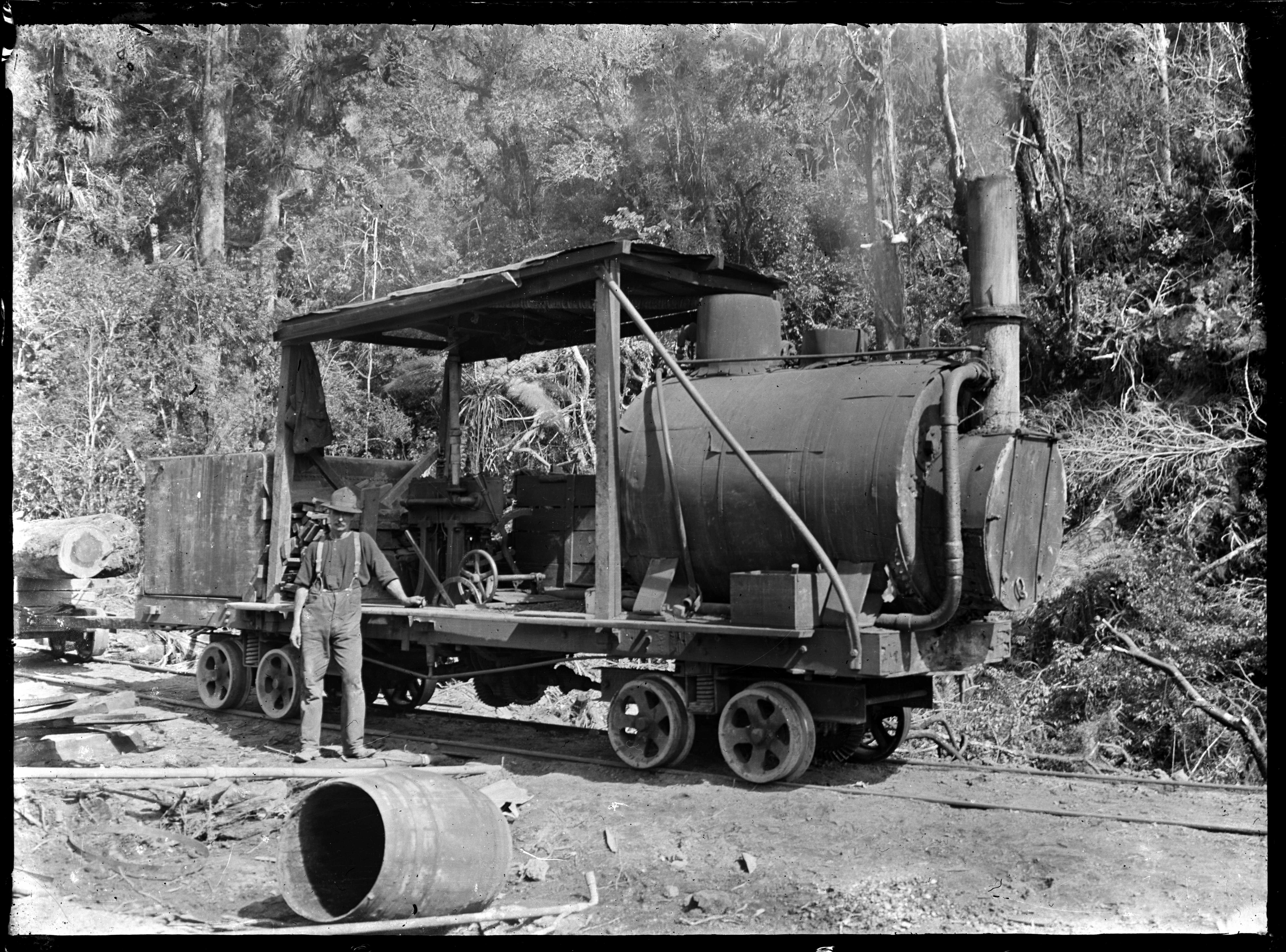
Price type "O" bush locomotive at Raurimu, ca. 1917

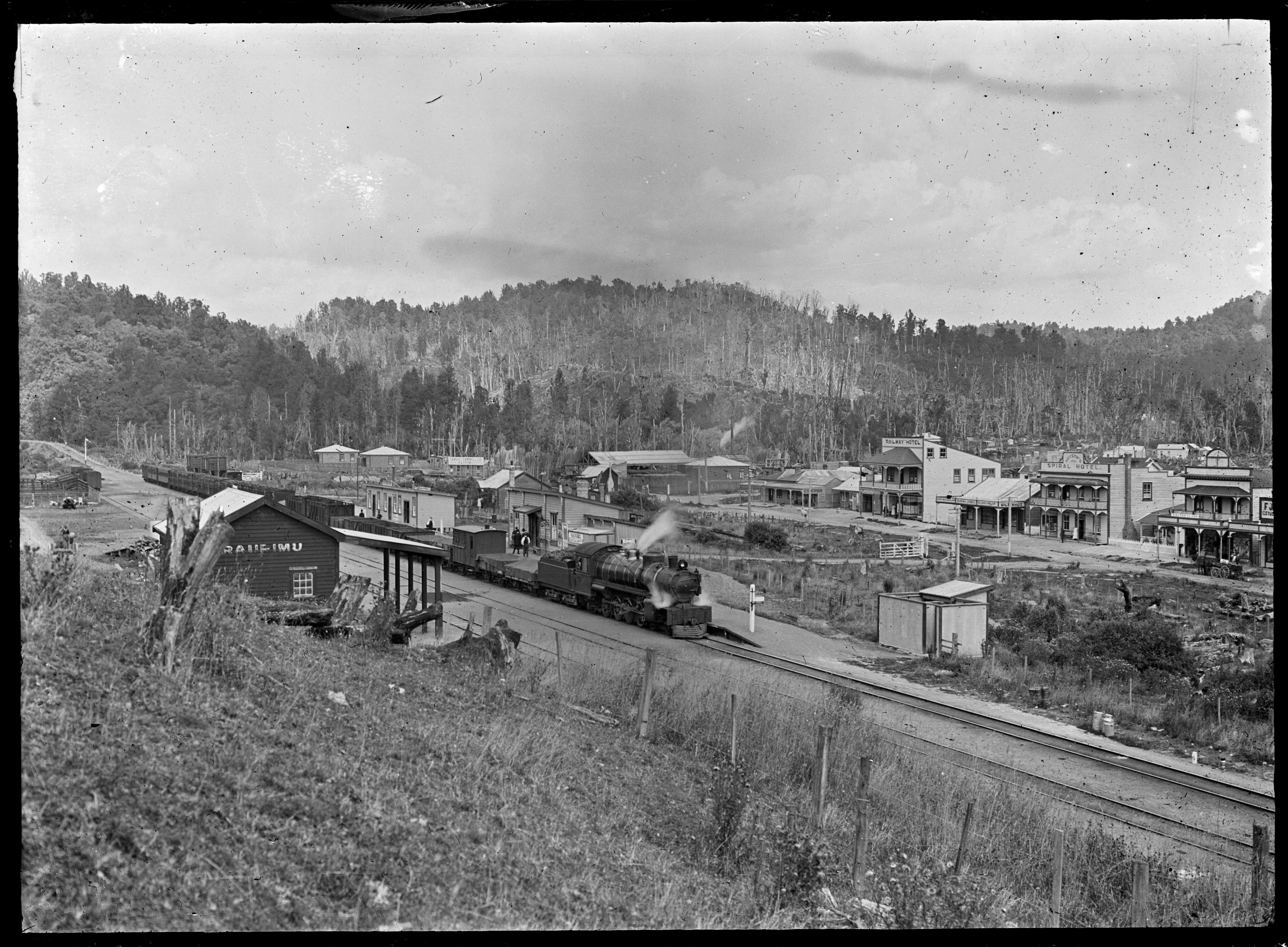
Offices of the Tamaki Sawmill Co. at Raurimu railway station

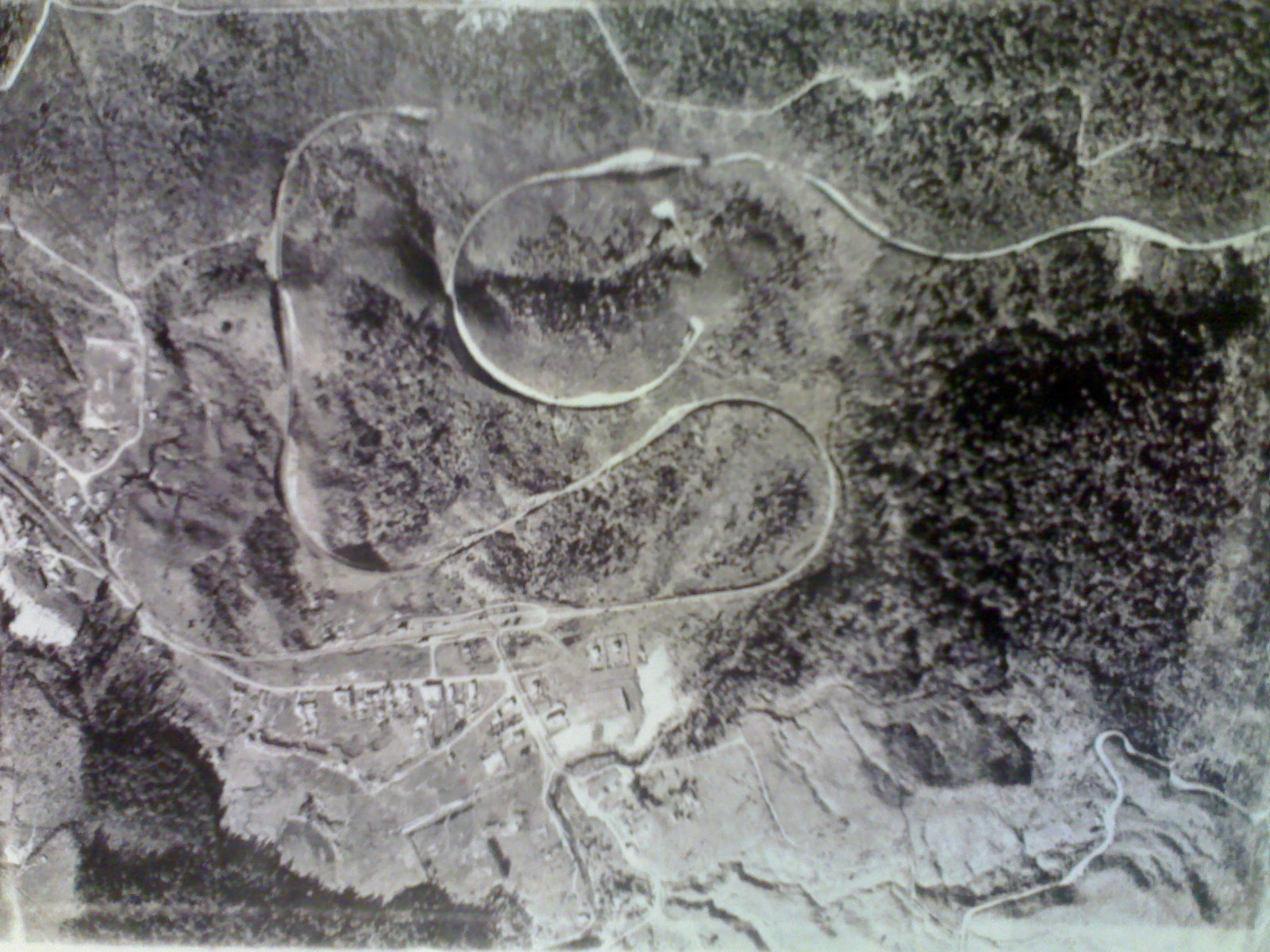
Raurimu Spiral in 2007 (no remains of tramways visible)

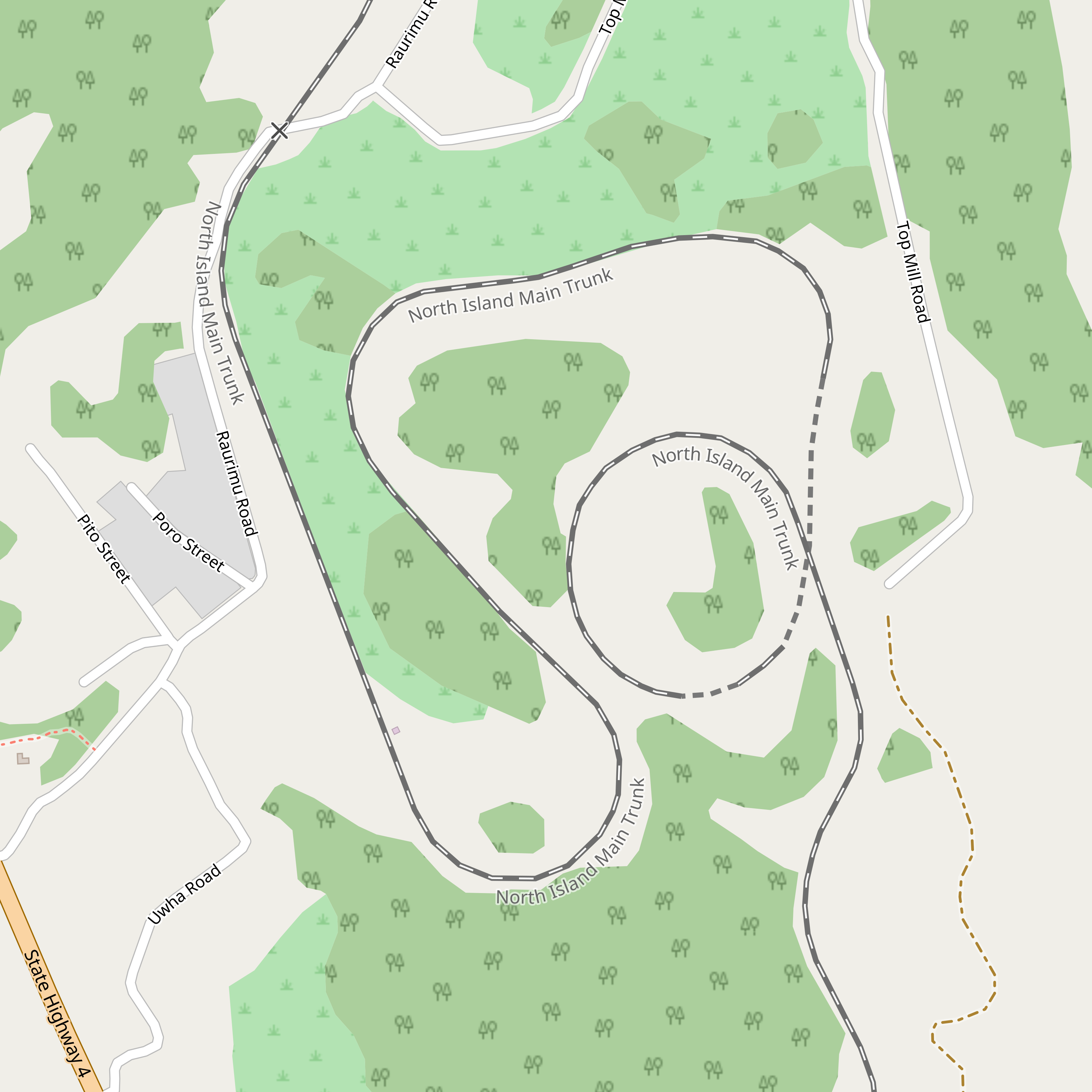
Map of the spiral, from OpenStreetMap
