= Raurimu Spiral =

Section of North Island Main Trunk

Coordinates: 39°7.4′S 175°23.8′E

Location of the Raurimu Spiral in the central North Island of New Zealand.

The Raurimu Spiral (Māori: Te Koru o Raurimu) is a single-track railway spiral, starting with a horseshoe curve, overcoming a 139-metre (456 ft) height difference, in the central North Island of New Zealand, on the North Island Main Trunk railway (NIMT) between Wellington and Auckland. It is a notable feat of civil engineering, having been called an "engineering masterpiece." The Institute of Professional Engineers of New Zealand has designated the spiral as a significant engineering heritage site.

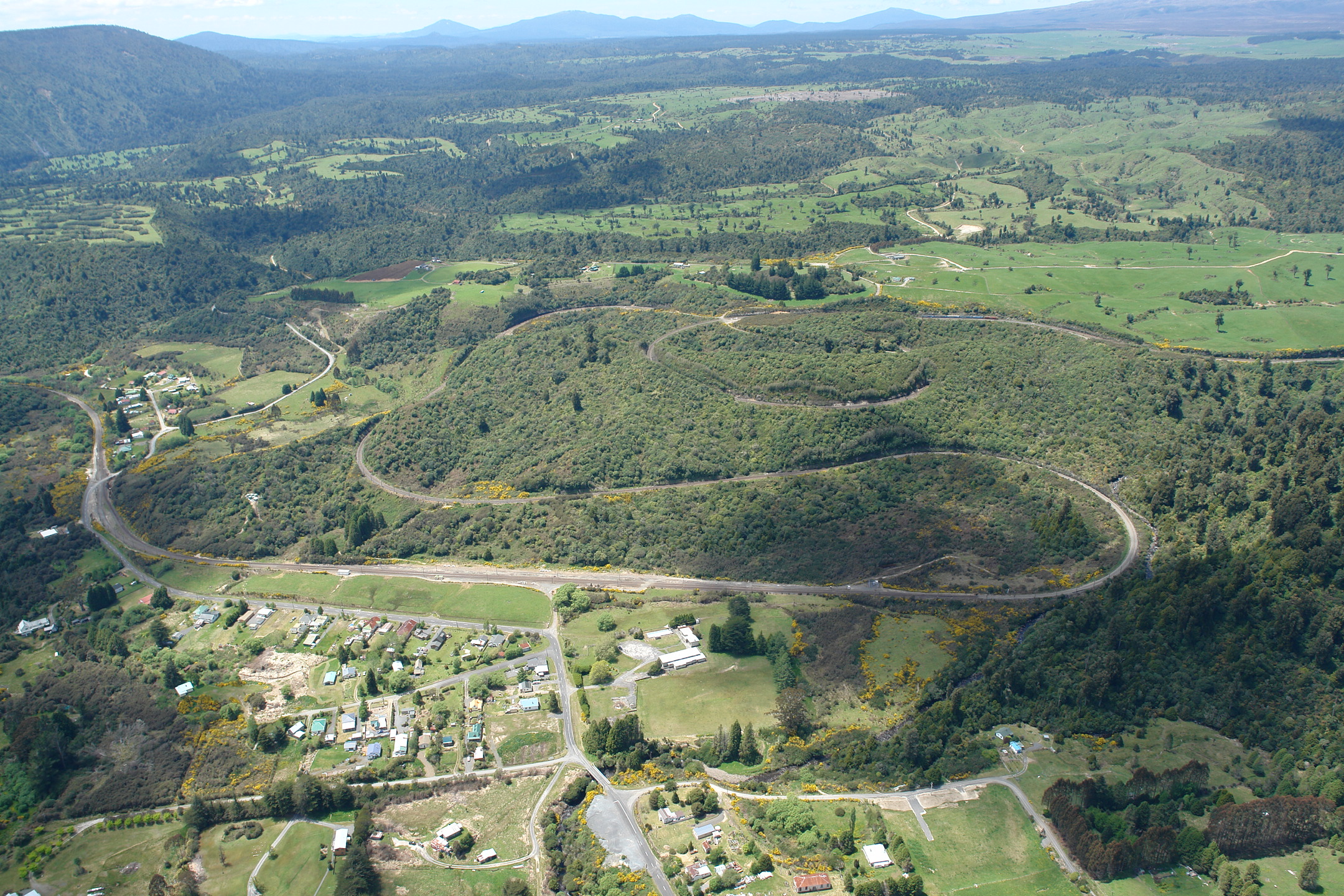
View of the spiral from the air

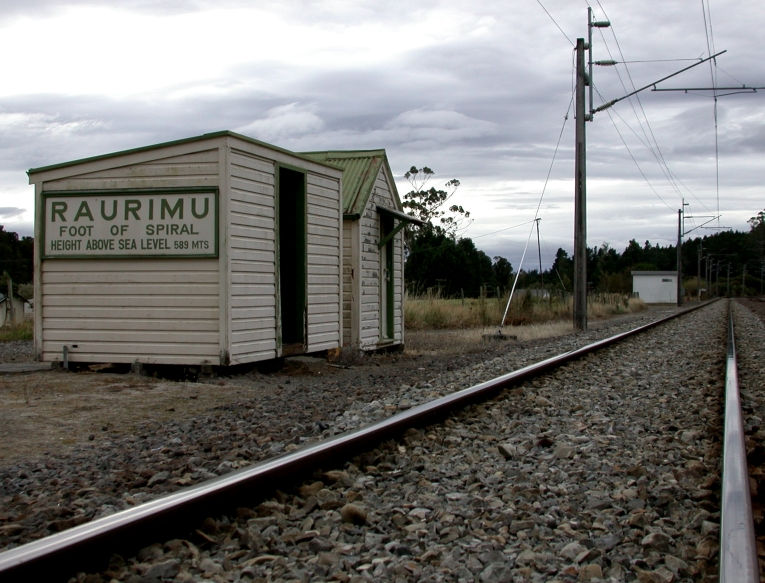
Raurimu railway station

== Background ==
During the construction of the central section of the North Island Main Trunk, a major obstacle arose: how to cross the steep slopes between the North Island Volcanic Plateau to the east and the valleys and gorges of the Whanganui River to the west?

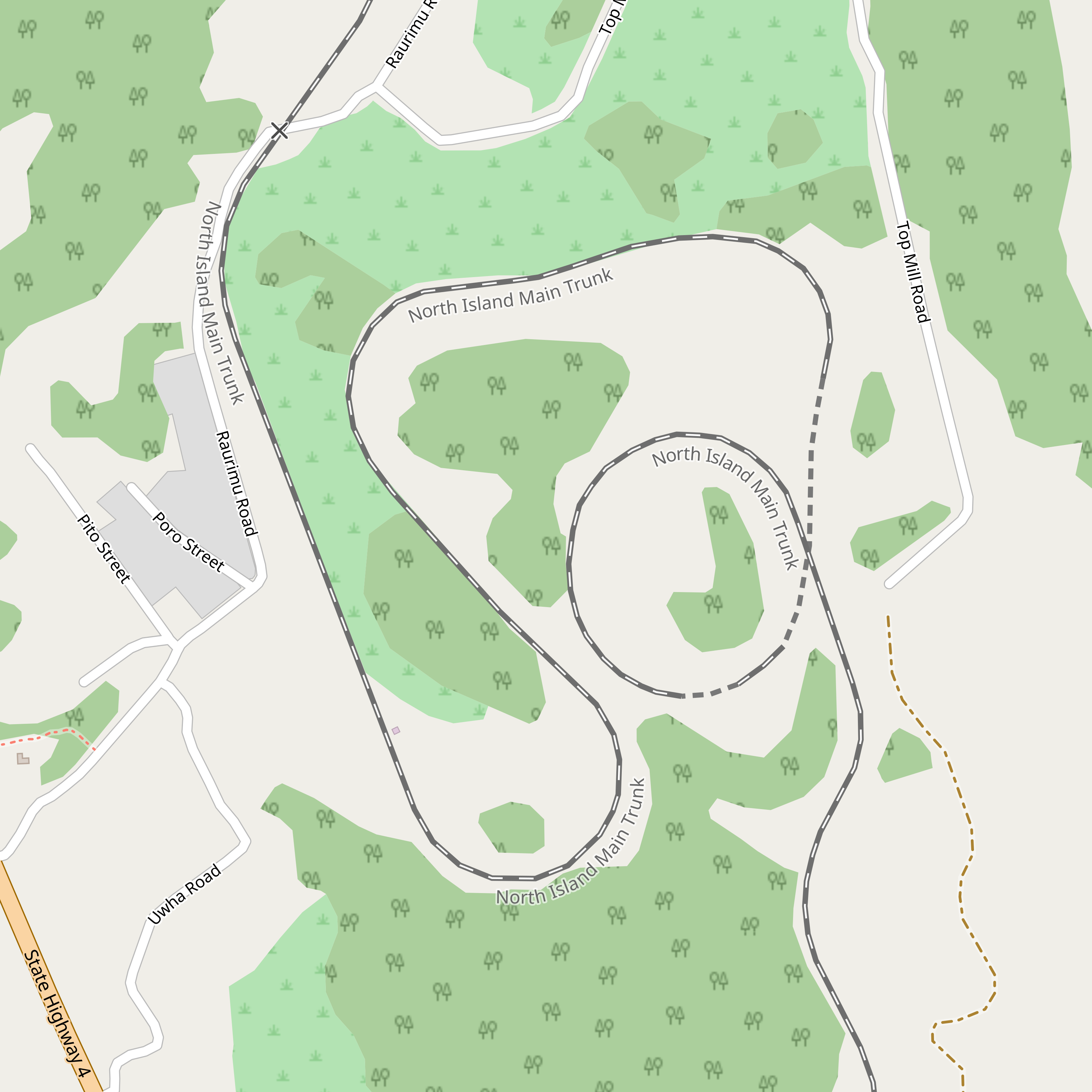
Map of the spiral, from OpenStreetMap

South of Taumarunui, the terrain is steep, but not unmanageable, with the exception of the stretch between Raurimu and National Park, where the land rises too steeply for a direct railway route. A direct railway line between these two points would rise 200 metres (660 ft) in a distance of some 5 kilometres (3.1 mi), a gradient of 1 in 24. The area was thoroughly surveyed during the 1880s in an attempt to find a route with a lesser grade, but the only viable possibility seemed to require a 20-kilometre (12 mi) detour and nine massive viaducts. Even then, the gradient would have been much steeper than 1 in 50.

== Construction ==
The problem was solved in 1898 by a surveyor in the employ of Robert Holmes, Public Works Department engineer. He proposed a line that looped back upon itself and then spiralled around with the aid of tunnels and bridges, rising at a gradient of 1 in 52. Although costly and labour-intensive, the scheme was still cheaper than the previous plan by Browne and Turner which required 9 viaducts down the Piopiotea River. The most remarkable feature is that there is no place to view the complete line. By all accounts, Holmes visualised the layout in his imagination.

The railway forms an ascending spiral southwards, with two relatively short tunnels, a circle and three hairpin bends. From the north, trains pass Raurimu station before going around a 200° bend to the left in a horseshoe curve, climbing above the track on which they have just travelled. Two sharp bends to the right follow, after which the line passes through two short tunnels, the Lower Spiral Tunnel (384 m) and the Upper Spiral Tunnel (96 m). Trains then complete a full circle, crossing over the Lower Spiral Tunnel through which they have just passed which is 23-metre (75 ft) below, before continuing towards Wellington. Two kilometres (1.2 mi) further on the line has two more sharp bends, to the right and then to the left.

After the second of these bends, a train has risen 132 metres (433 ft) high and travelled 6.8 kilometres (4.2 mi) from Raurimu station – the straight-line distance is 2 kilometres (1.2 mi). Some of the sharp curves are only 7½ chains (150 m) radius.

Although sometimes spirals are relatively common in the Alps, particularly in Switzerland, they generally involve extensive tunnelling inside mountainsides. A masterly feature of Holmes' layout is the way in which it uses natural land contours so that no viaducts are needed, and only two short tunnels.

== Folklore ==
Legend has it that a locomotive engineer once engaged the emergency brakes of his train upon mistaking the light of his own guard's van on a nearby part of the spiral for the rear of a different train directly ahead of him.

== See also ==
- Bethungra Spiral
- Tehachapi Loop
