= Balfour, New Zealand =

Balfour
- Interactive map of Balfour
- Coordinates: 45°50′S 168°35′E
- Country: New Zealand
- Island: South Island
- Region: Southland region
- Territorial authorities of New Zealand: Southland District
- Ward: Mararoa Waimea Ward
- Community: Ardlussa Community
- Electorates: Southland; Te Tai Tonga (Māori)

Government
  - Territorial authority: Southland District Council
  - Regional council: Southland Regional Council
  - Mayor of Southland: Rob Scott
  - Southland MP: Joseph Mooney
  - Te Tai Tonga MP: Tākuta Ferris

Area
  - Total: 0.48 km^{2} (0.19 sq mi)

Population (June 2025)
  - Total: 140
  - Density: 290/km^{2} (760/sq mi)

Balfour is a small town located in the Southland region of New Zealand.

Accounts of Balfour's naming differ: according to one report, it was named after an employee of the Waimea Company who lived there; alternatively it may have been named after James Melville Balfour, Marine Engineer to the New Zealand Government and uncle of Robert Louis Stevenson.

== Geography ==
Balfour is located between the Hokonui Hills and the Mataura River in the Waimea Plains, and is about fifteen kilometres southeast of Lumsden. It is located on New Zealand State Highway 94, the main road linking Gore with the tourist destination of Milford Sound.

== Demographics ==
Balfour is described as a rural settlement by Statistics New Zealand. It covers 0.48 km^{2} (0.19 sq mi), and had an estimated population of 140 as of June 2025, with a population density of 292 people per km^{2}. It is part of the much larger Lumsden-Balfour statistical area.

Historical population
Year	Pop.	±% p.a.
2006	138	—
2013	126	−1.29%
2018	117	−1.47%

Balfour had a population of 117 at the 2018 New Zealand census, a decrease of 9 people (−7.1%) since the 2013 census, and a decrease of 21 people (−15.2%) since the 2006 census. There were 48 households, comprising 66 males and 54 females, giving a sex ratio of 1.22 males per female. The median age was 40.8 years (compared with 37.4 years nationally), with 18 people (15.4%) aged under 15 years, 27 (23.1%) aged 15 to 29, 42 (35.9%) aged 30 to 64, and 30 (25.6%) aged 65 or older.

Ethnicities were 94.9% European/Pākehā, 10.3% Māori, and 2.6% Asian. People may identify with more than one ethnicity.

Although some people chose not to answer the census's question about religious affiliation, 53.8% had no religion, and 35.9% were Christian.

Of those at least 15 years old, 6 (6.1%) people had a bachelor's or higher degree, and 33 (33.3%) people had no formal qualifications. The median income was $34,300, compared with $31,800 nationally. 9 people (9.1%) earned over $70,000 compared to 17.2% nationally. The employment status of those at least 15 was that 51 (51.5%) people were employed full-time, and 18 (18.2%) were part-time.

== Railway ==
In 1880, the Waimea Plains Railway was opened; it linked Gore on the Main South Line with Lumsden on the Kingston Branch and passed through Balfour. The line was an important economic link for many years, and the original Kingston Flyers that gave their name to today's Kingston Flyer tourist train in Kingston passed through Balfour on their way to Gore or Dunedin from the 1890s through to Easter 1957.

With the improvement of road transportation and changes in government regulations, the railway lost its profitability, and in 1971, most of it was closed. Balfour now became the terminus of a short branch line from Lumsden, and it was hoped that shipments of wheat from surrounding farms would provide sufficient traffic to keep the line open. Unfortunately, the quantities of traffic desired from Balfour did not eventuate and the railway was closed on 15 January 1978. Today, the old Balfour station platform has been incorporated into a children's playground.

== Economy ==
The town's industry is predominantly agricultural. In the surrounding area, cattle, sheep, grain, and deer are farmed. A dairy factory once operated in the town. Dairy farming has again become economically important in recent years. A lime works, started in 1910, recently closed.

== Education ==
Balfour School is a state contributing primary school for years 1 to 6 with a roll of 69 as of July 2026. The school was established in 1887.

== Sport ==
Balfour annually hosts a rugby sevens tournament. This tournament typically involves teams from Southland and Otago. It is also a popular location for trout fishing.
