= Riversdale, New Zealand =

Riversdale
- Interactive map of Riversdale
- Country: New Zealand
- Island: South Island
- Region: Southland region
- Territorial authorities of New Zealand: Southland District
- Ward: Mararoa Waimea Ward
- Community: Ardlussa Community
- Electorates: Southland; Te Tai Tonga (Māori)

Government
  - Territorial authority: Southland District Council
  - Regional council: Southland Regional Council
  - Mayor of Southland: Rob Scott
  - Southland MP: Joseph Mooney
  - Te Tai Tonga MP: Tākuta Ferris

Area
  - Total: 1.69 km^{2} (0.65 sq mi)

Population (June 2025)
  - Total: 490
  - Density: 290/km^{2} (750/sq mi)

Riversdale is a small town in the Southland region of New Zealand.

== Geography ==
Riversdale is located between the Hokonui Hills and the Mataura River in the heart of the Waimea Plains, and is roughly equidistant between Gore and Lumsden on State Highway 94, the main road linking Gore with the tourist destination of Milford Sound.

In terms of climate, Riversdale has a temperate oceanic climate grading onto a continental climate more commonly found in Central Otago, with cold, wet winters and warm summers. The Riversdale region is one of the few areas in Southland prone to drought during the summer months.

== Demographics ==
Riversdale is described as a rural settlement by Statistics New Zealand. It covers 1.69 km^{2} (0.65 sq mi), and had an estimated population of 490 as of June 2025, with a population density of 290 people per km^{2}. It is part of the much larger Riversdale-Piano Flat statistical area.

Historical population for Riversdale
Year	Pop.	±% p.a.
2006	408	—
2013	399	−0.32%
2018	408	+0.45%

Riversdale had a population of 408 at the 2018 New Zealand census, an increase of 9 people (2.3%) since the 2013 census, and unchanged since the 2006 census. There were 168 households, comprising 207 males and 201 females, giving a sex ratio of 1.03 males per female, with 78 people (19.1%) aged under 15 years, 63 (15.4%) aged 15 to 29, 174 (42.6%) aged 30 to 64, and 93 (22.8%) aged 65 or older.

Ethnicities were 89.0% European/Pākehā, 13.2% Māori, 1.5% Pasifika, 3.7% Asian, and 1.5% other ethnicities. People may identify with more than one ethnicity.

Although some people chose not to answer the census's question about religious affiliation, 47.1% had no religion, 47.1% were Christian and 0.7% had other religions.

Of those at least 15 years old, 30 (9.1%) people had a bachelor's or higher degree, and 93 (28.2%) people had no formal qualifications. 60 people (18.2%) earned over $70,000 compared to 17.2% nationally. The employment status of those at least 15 was that 165 (50.0%) people were employed full-time, 51 (15.5%) were part-time, and 6 (1.8%) were unemployed.

=== Riversdale-Piano Flat ===
Riversdale-Piano Flat statistical area covers 1,578.74 km^{2} (609.55 sq mi) and also includes Waikaia. It had an estimated population of 1,520 as of June 2025, with a population density of 1.0 people per km^{2}.

Historical population for Riversdale-Piano Flat
Year	Pop.	±% p.a.
2006	1,299	—
2013	1,341	+0.46%
2018	1,374	+0.49%

Riversdale-Piano Flat had a population of 1,374 at the 2018 New Zealand census, an increase of 33 people (2.5%) since the 2013 census, and an increase of 75 people (5.8%) since the 2006 census. There were 540 households, comprising 735 males and 639 females, giving a sex ratio of 1.15 males per female. The median age was 36.5 years (compared with 37.4 years nationally), with 303 people (22.1%) aged under 15 years, 249 (18.1%) aged 15 to 29, 606 (44.1%) aged 30 to 64, and 216 (15.7%) aged 65 or older.

Ethnicities were 92.1% European/Pākehā, 10.5% Māori, 1.1% Pasifika, 3.7% Asian, and 1.1% other ethnicities. People may identify with more than one ethnicity.

The percentage of people born overseas was 10.3, compared with 27.1% nationally.

Although some people chose not to answer the census's question about religious affiliation, 48.3% had no religion, 44.8% were Christian, 0.2% were Hindu and 0.7% had other religions.

Of those at least 15 years old, 129 (12.0%) people had a bachelor's or higher degree, and 246 (23.0%) people had no formal qualifications. The median income was $39,900, compared with $31,800 nationally. 189 people (17.6%) earned over $70,000 compared to 17.2% nationally. The employment status of those at least 15 was that 642 (59.9%) people were employed full-time, 186 (17.4%) were part-time, and 24 (2.2%) were unemployed.

== Railway ==
In 1880, the Waimea Plains Railway was opened; it linked Gore on the Main South Line with Lumsden on the Kingston Branch and passed through Riversdale. The line was an important economic link for many years, and the original Kingston Flyers that gave their name to today's Kingston Flyer tourist train in Kingston passed through Riversdale on their way to Gore or Dunedin from the 1890s through to Easter 1957.

With the improvement of road transportation and changes in government regulations, the railway lost its profitability, and in 1971, most of the line was closed, including the section through Riversdale.

== Education ==
Riversdale School is a state full primary school for years 1 to 8 with a roll of 138 as of July 2026. The school first opened in 1882.

== Climate ==
Climate data for Waipounamu (5km N of Riversdale, 1991–2020)
Month	Jan	Feb	Mar	Apr	May	Jun	Jul	Aug	Sep	Oct	Nov	Dec	Year
Mean daily maximum °C (°F)	20.6 (69.1)	20.5 (68.9)	18.5 (65.3)	15.5 (59.9)	12.4 (54.3)	9.4 (48.9)	8.6 (47.5)	10.6 (51.1)	13.5 (56.3)	15.1 (59.2)	17.0 (62.6)	19.5 (67.1)	15.1 (59.2)
Daily mean °C (°F)	14.9 (58.8)	14.6 (58.3)	12.5 (54.5)	10.1 (50.2)	7.2 (45.0)	4.6 (40.3)	3.9 (39.0)	5.6 (42.1)	8.1 (46.6)	9.9 (49.8)	11.7 (53.1)	14.0 (57.2)	9.8 (49.6)
Mean daily minimum °C (°F)	9.1 (48.4)	8.6 (47.5)	6.6 (43.9)	4.6 (40.3)	2.1 (35.8)	−0.2 (31.6)	−0.8 (30.6)	0.7 (33.3)	2.8 (37.0)	4.8 (40.6)	6.3 (43.3)	8.4 (47.1)	4.4 (40.0)
Source: NIWA
