= Waikaia Branch =

Closed South Island railway branch line

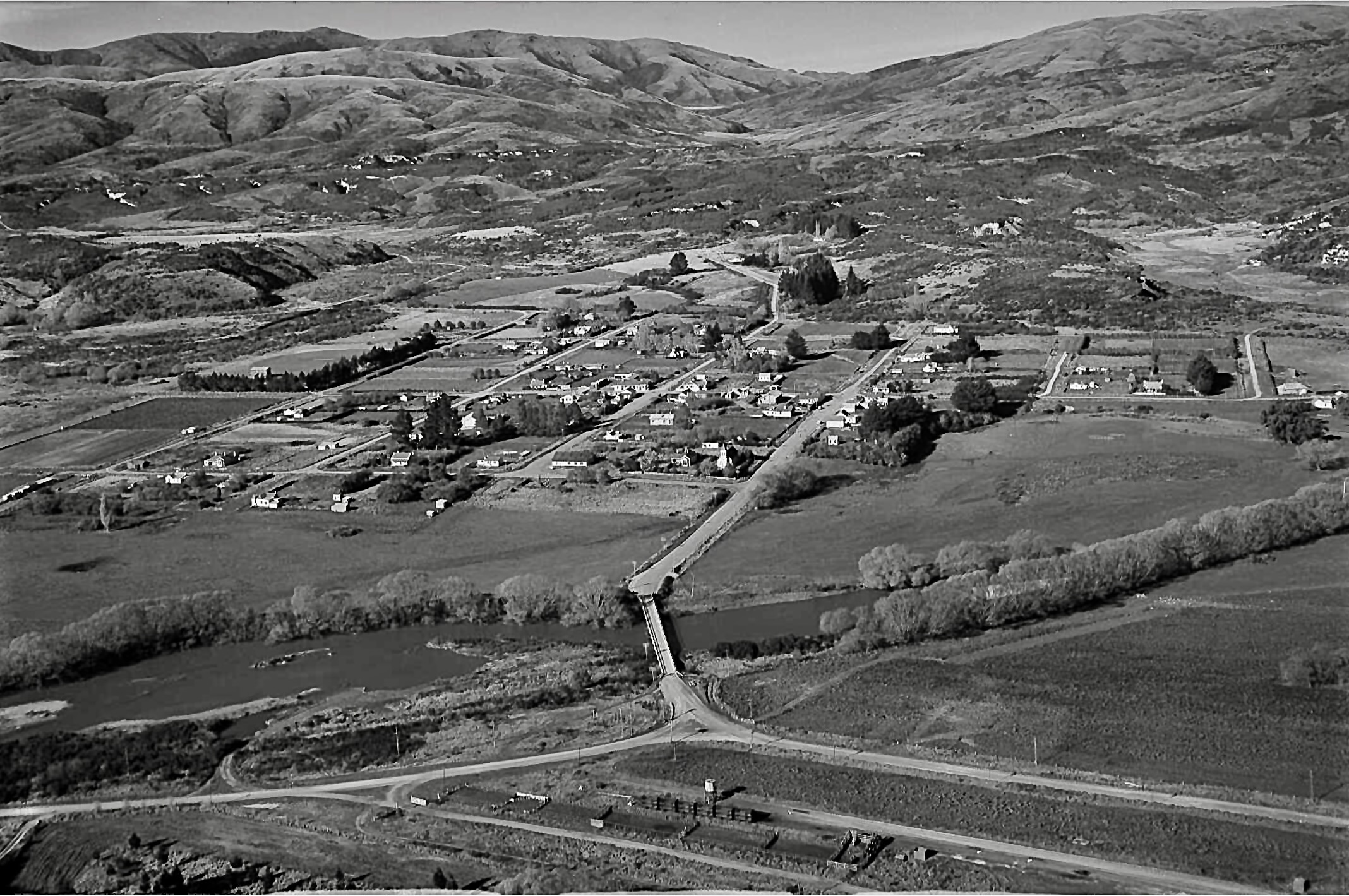
- Waikaia in 1955, with the station and its water tower in the foreground

Overview
- Other name(s): Switzers Branch
- Status: Closed
- Owner: Railways Department
- Locale: Southland, New Zealand
- Termini: Riversdale; Waikaia
- Stations: 6

Service
- Type: Heavy Rail
- System: New Zealand Government Railways (NZGR)
- Operator(s): Railways Department

History
- Opened: 1909
- Closed: 1959

Technical
- Line length: 22.19 km (13.79 mi)
- Number of tracks: Single
- Character: Rural
- Track gauge: 3 ft 6 in (1,067 mm)

Map

The Waikaia Branch, also known as the Switzers Branch, was a branch line railway in Southland, New Zealand. Proposed as early as the 1870s, it was not opened until 1909 and was operated by the New Zealand Railways Department for half a century until its closure in 1959.

== Construction ==
In the late 1870s, proposals for a railway line to or through Waikaia (then Switzers) and environs were seriously considered. These proposals were as part of the Waimea Plains Railway to link Gore on the Main South Line with Lumsden on the Kingston Branch and featured either a circuitous line that passed through Waikaia, or a direct line with a branch to Waikaia. The Waimea Plains Railway was subsequently built on the direct route, and in 1880, a royal commission of New Zealand's railway network favoured an alternate route to the Waikaia area. It suggested that a line be built from Kelso on the Tapanui Branch. The previously proposed branch from the Waimea Plains Railway was favoured, however, as it had been argued that it would open up a considerable area of productive farming land, and in 1884, construction commenced northwards from Riversdale. The terrain made construction easy and ten kilometres of formation had been made with 3.2 kilometres of track laid before economic difficulties associated with the Long Depression brought work to a halt. At some point over the next twenty years, the track was removed to be used elsewhere. Work on the line recommenced by 1904; a combined road-rail bridge over the Mataura River, the only work of significance required for the line, opened in May of that year. There were local fears that only the initial portion of the line would be built, but in 1905, the Undersecretary for Public Works and the district engineer inspected the proposed route and felt that due to the agricultural land that would be served, it would be a mistake to terminate the line short of Waikaia township. By 1908, the 3.2 kilometres constructed in the 1880s had been fully relaid and beyond this point, construction was swift. The 22 kilometre long line opened on 1 October 1909.

== Stations ==
The following were stations on the Waikaia Branch, in order from the junction at Riversdale:

- Waipounamu
- Plains
- Waiparu
- Freshford
- Dome
- Waikaia, originally Switzers, 22.19 km from the junction.

== Operation ==
The Waikaia Branch was essentially a line to nowhere. Roughly 1,700 people lived in the area served by the line when it opened, and Waikaia was home to a mere 250 people. Photos of the grand opening, attended by Prime Minister Joseph Ward, show that the Waikaia station was essentially in the middle of a field. Initially, there was some traffic generated by gold mining and dredging near Waikaia, but the line was much too late to serve the gold fields of the 19th century and it mainly carried agricultural traffic. Its role was essentially to open up the surrounding land to farming and to provide a convenient link to major centres before the development of modern road transportation.

In 1925, Ford Model T bus equipment was used as the basis for two railcars, the RM class Model T Ford railcars. They began operating on the Waikaia Branch as well as the Wyndham Branch in late May 1926 in an attempt to provide more efficient passenger service at a lower operating cost. They proved to be economical by the Railways Department's fuel consumption standards of the time, able to run 100 km on 18.8 litres of fuel. However, as the railcars rode roughly and were prone to overheating, they were unpopular with passengers and thus unsuccessful. The line became freight only from 9 February 1931. By the 1950s, the region's population had dwindled to a meagre 200 and trains ran twice weekly. What traffic did exist - mainly livestock and agricultural lime - was being transferred to the expanding road network. With no reason to justify the line's continued existence, the Waikaia Branch closed on 16 May 1959.

=== Motive power ===
In the early years of the line, small tank locomotives such as the F class were used to run trains from the junction in Riversdale, but in the later years, considerably larger tender locomotives such as the A class were used. Apart from the 1926-31 experiment with the Model T Ford railcars, the line was always operated by steam locomotives; it closed before dieselisation began in Southland to any substantial degree.

== Today ==
It is not unusual for relics from closed railway lines to deteriorate and disappear over time, but remnants can be found the length of the Waikaia Branch. Much of the formation is still visible from local roads, and bridge foundations remain at a number of stream crossings. Freshford station still possesses its loading bank, stockyard, and goods shed, which are preserved by local residents. A loading bank and ramp for sheep to board wagons remained in Waipounamu until being removed in the late 1990s or early 2000s to allow for other development. In Waikaia, the locomotive water tank has been preserved by the locals, and on its side, "Switzers - Estd 1909" is written in large letters. Nearby, the goods shed remained standing, with both "Switzers" and "Waikaia" visible on the ends, until it collapsed in 2005. The water tank also collapsed around this time but was restored.

== See also ==
- Main South Line
- Waimea Plains Railway
- Kingston Branch
- Mossburn Branch
- Waikaka branch
- Wyndham/Glenham Branch
