= Acteon chattonensis =

Scientific classification
- Kingdom: Animalia
- Phylum: Mollusca
- Class: Gastropoda
- Superfamily: Acteonoidea
- Family: Acteonidae
- Genus: Acteon
- Species: †A. chattonensis

Binomial name
- †Acteon chattonensis Marwick, 1929

Extinct species of gastropods

Acteon chattonensis is an extinct species of sea snail, a marine gastropod mollusc in the family Acteonidae.

== Description ==
The length of the shell attains 4.2 mm, its diameter 2.75 mm.

== Distribution ==
Fossils of this marine species have been found in Tertiary strata in Chatton, Southland, New Zealand.
