= Waimea Plain (Southland) =

Coordinates: 45.9913°S 168.8261°E

The Waimea Plains is an area of pastoral land extending from Gore toward Lumsden. The land is chiefly used for sheep and deer farming, and is part of the Southland Plains.

== See also ==
- Waimea Plains Railway
