= Wyndham Branch =

Railway line in New Zealand

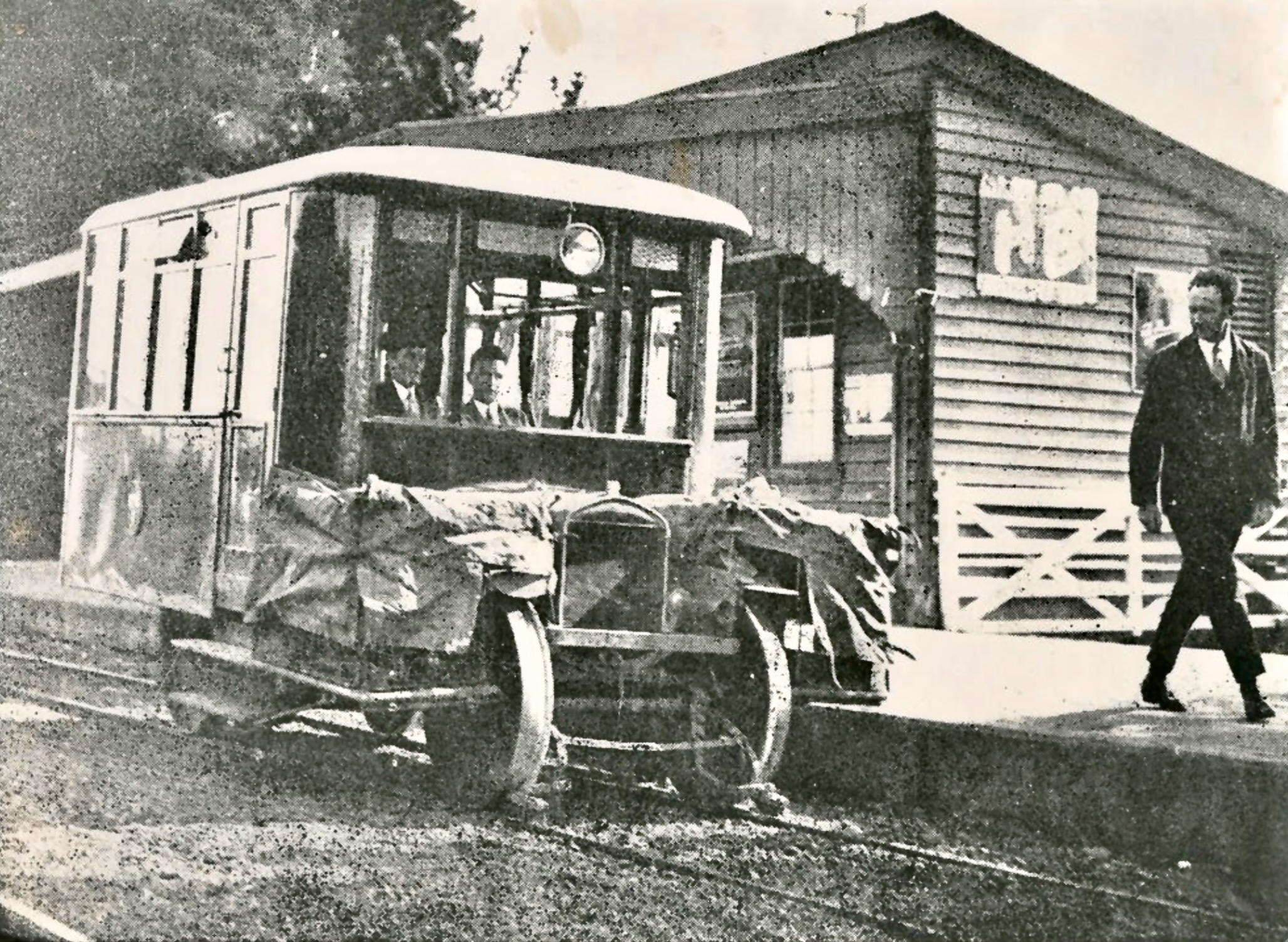
- Railcar and stationmaster at Wyndham

Overview
- Other names: Glenham Branch; Edendale Fortrose Railway
- Status: Closed
- Owner: NZ Railways Department
- Locale: Southland, New Zealand
- Termini: Edendale; Wyndham
- Stations: 4

Service
- Type: Heavy rail
- System: New Zealand Government Railways (NZGR)
- Operator(s): NZ Railways Department

History
- Opened: 2 October 1882
- Extended to Glenham: 1 May 1890
- Closed beyond Wyndham: 14 July 1930
- Closed: 20 June 1962

Technical
- Line length: 15.17 kilometres (9.43 mi)
- Number of tracks: Single
- Character: Rural
- Track gauge: 3 ft 6 in (1,067 mm)

Map

The Wyndham Branch, also known as the Glenham Branch, was a branch line railway in Southland, New Zealand. The first section was opened in 1882 and it operated until 1962. Although its name would imply that it terminated in Wyndham, an extension to a terminus in Glenham operated for forty years. It was operated by the New Zealand Railways Department.

== Construction ==
The Main South Line from Dunedin to Invercargill was built on the west side of the Mataura River north of Edendale, thereby leaving the small east bank town of Wyndham off the route. To satisfy local residents, a 6.5 km long branch was built from Edendale to the town and it opened on 2 October 1882. A further section had been let to a contractor, but with half of the works complete, they abandoned the project. Further processes of plan review and granting of contracts meant that the branch did not reach the town of Glenham until 1 May 1890. There were proposals to continue the branch into the lower Mataura River area, but in August 1888, the Public Works Department stated that no further expenditure on the line was proposed once it was complete to Glenham, and the Tokanui Branch (which at the time terminated in Mokotua) was extended into the lower Mataura instead. As Glenham was now established as the terminus, a locomotive depot was established in the town. Along the route from Wyndham to Glenham, a tunnel was required, and it became the second to southernmost railway tunnel in New Zealand and thereby one of the most southern railway tunnels in the world. Due to heavy rain, 3 workers died during construction of the tunnel in 1887. The ruling gradient between Wyndham and Glenham was 1 in 50.

== Stations ==
The following stations were located on the Wyndham Branch (in brackets is the distance from the junction in Edendale):

- Menzies Ferry 3.4 km (2.1 mi), was mentioned as a stopping place in 1890, but it wasn't until 14 March 1907 that £20 was spent on a shelter shed and it formally opened as a flag station for passengers and parcels. In 1933 the shed has moved to Riverton Racecourse for £11.14 and on Saturday, 27 January 1934, Menzies Ferry was closed.
- Wyndham Racecourse 5.2 km (3.2 mi), was served by special trains stopping opposite the racecourse on race days.
- Wyndham 6.5 km (4.0 mi), by 1886 had a 5th class station, platform, cart approach, 41 ft (12 m) (extended to 80ft about 1891) x 31 ft (9.4 m) goods shed, loading bank, urinals and a passing loop for 19 wagons, extended to 39 by 1898, together with cattle yards (after 1892) and a stationmaster's house. The station was enlarged in 1897, a verandah added in 1911 and electric lighting in 1923.
- Glenham 15.17 km (9.43 mi), had a shelter shed, platform, cart approach, 40 ft (12 m) x 30 ft (9.1 m) goods shed, loading bank, cattle yards, water service, coal accommodation, engine shed, urinals, railway houses for locomotive staff and a Post Office operated by NZR staff until 1910.

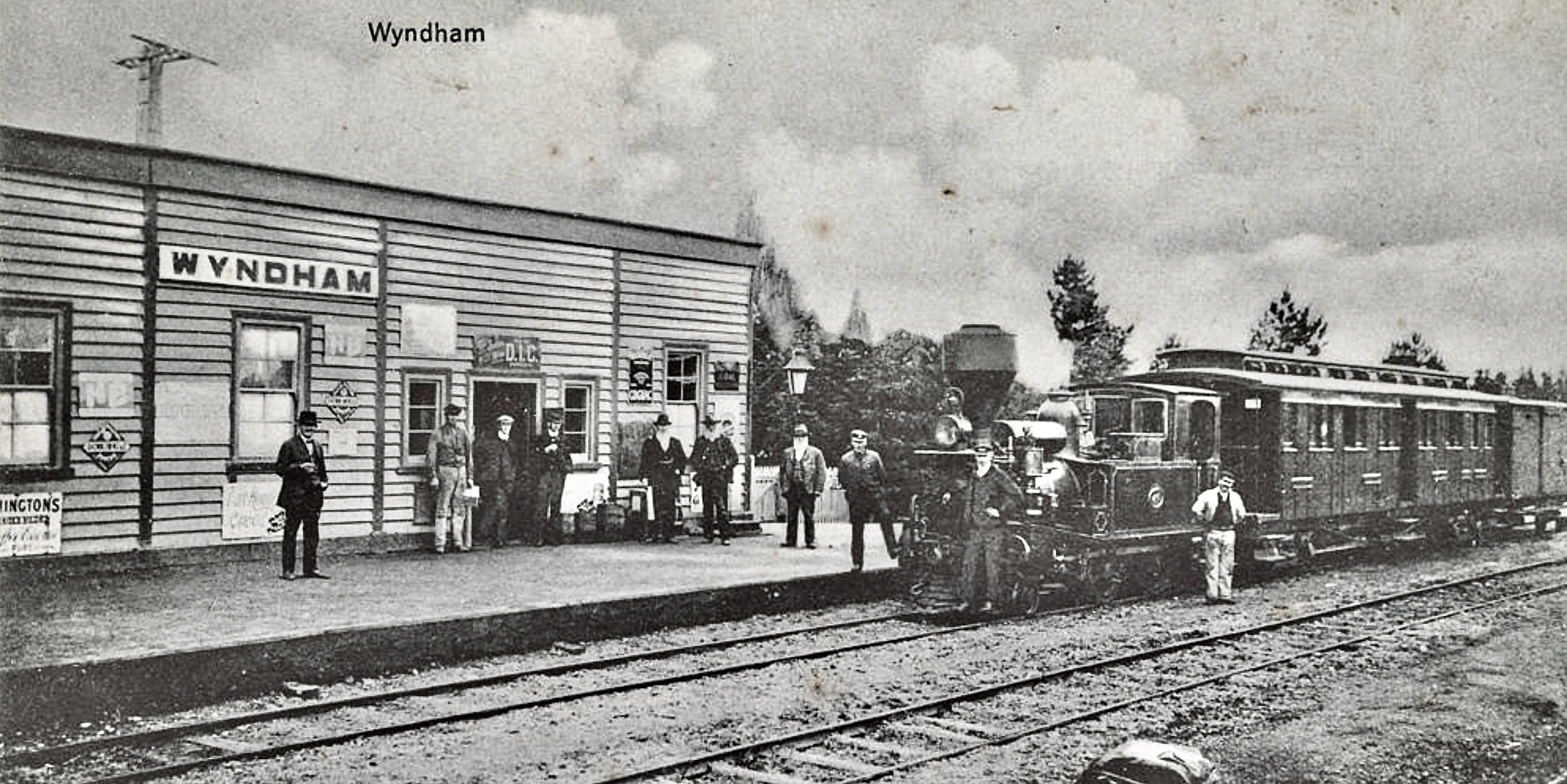
Mixed train at Wyndham, before the verandah was added in 1911

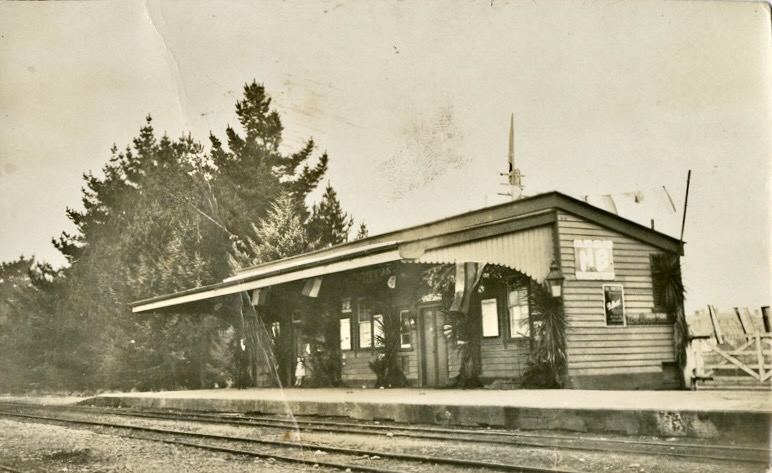
Wyndham about 1910

The tunnel between Wyndham and Glenham was approximately 301 metres (988 ft) long.

== Operation ==
Traffic on the Wyndham Branch was light from the beginning, and in its early years, it was described as being "in fine running trim". It adequately served the needs of the local community and provided access to markets before the establishment of a modern road network, but as the 20th century progressed, it began to lose money. Ford Model T bus equipment was used as the basis for two railcars in 1925, and from Monday, 7 June 1926, the RM class Model T Ford railcars began providing a service on the line as well as on the Waikaia Branch. They were economic, consuming 18.8 L (4.1 imp gal; 5.0 US gal) per 100 km (62 mi) and capable of running at 48 km/h (30 mph), a reasonable speed for rural branch lines at the time. Despite that, they did not prove sufficiently successful: problems related to rough riding and overheating made them unpopular with the public and they were discarded in 1931.

A 1930 commission of New Zealand's railway network recommended that passenger traffic be discontinued on the Wyndham Branch, as well as reducing staff and closing the locomotive depot. The administration of the railways went one step further than that, closing the entire section from Wyndham to Glenham on 14 July 1930. Soon afterwards, passenger services on the rest of the line were cancelled on 9 February 1931 and goods services were modified to run from Invercargill and return rather than from the branch's terminus and return. The only passenger trains on the line after 1931 were infrequent chartered excursions, such as one from Waikaka at the end of the Waikaka Branch on 26 March 1962 that carried almost 800 passengers. World War II provided a temporary boost in traffic and the line lost less money, but due to a lack of significant traffic, a 1952 commission recommended full closure. This did not occur for another ten years, however; the line essentially became an extended siding from Edendale's yard that was shunted by passing services on the main line. Closure was announced on 20 June 1962 and the last services ran a few months later on 9 September 1962.

== Today ==
Remnants of old railways typically fade with time or wholly disappear, and this is true for the Wyndham Branch. Very little of the route from Edendale to Wyndham is evident, except some traces of the formation around Edendale. Traces of the formation to Glenham are clearer and include embankments and cuttings, and the tunnel is difficult to find but viewable. At some point in the 1990s, the Department of Conservation cleared access to the tunnel as part of a summer works programme, but their work has been somewhat undone by nature. In the tiny village of Glenham, the flat area of the yard remains, though it lacks any distinguishing features or railway remnants of note. Since 2018 an annual Glenham Trainwreck Trail race has been held most years, including running through the tunnel.

== Glenham Sawmilling Company tramway ==
By 1905 George Crosby and Ayson Brothers had flaxmills at Glenham. In 1909 Aysons completed a 6 mi (9.7 km) tramway east from Glenham railway station and Crosby transferred his tramway rights to the Glenham Sawmilling Company. Initially it was worked by horses, but, in 1910, J Johnston & Sons, Vulcan Foundry, Invercargill, built a 14 ton locomotive, able to haul timber on the tramway, which had gradients as steep as 1 in 10 on the route to Tyneholm. The tramway also had a motor jigger. In 1918 the Company sold a locomotive and tramway equipment and gave up its right to a tramway. One source says the locomotive then went to the Kumara-Kapitea Sawmilling Company.

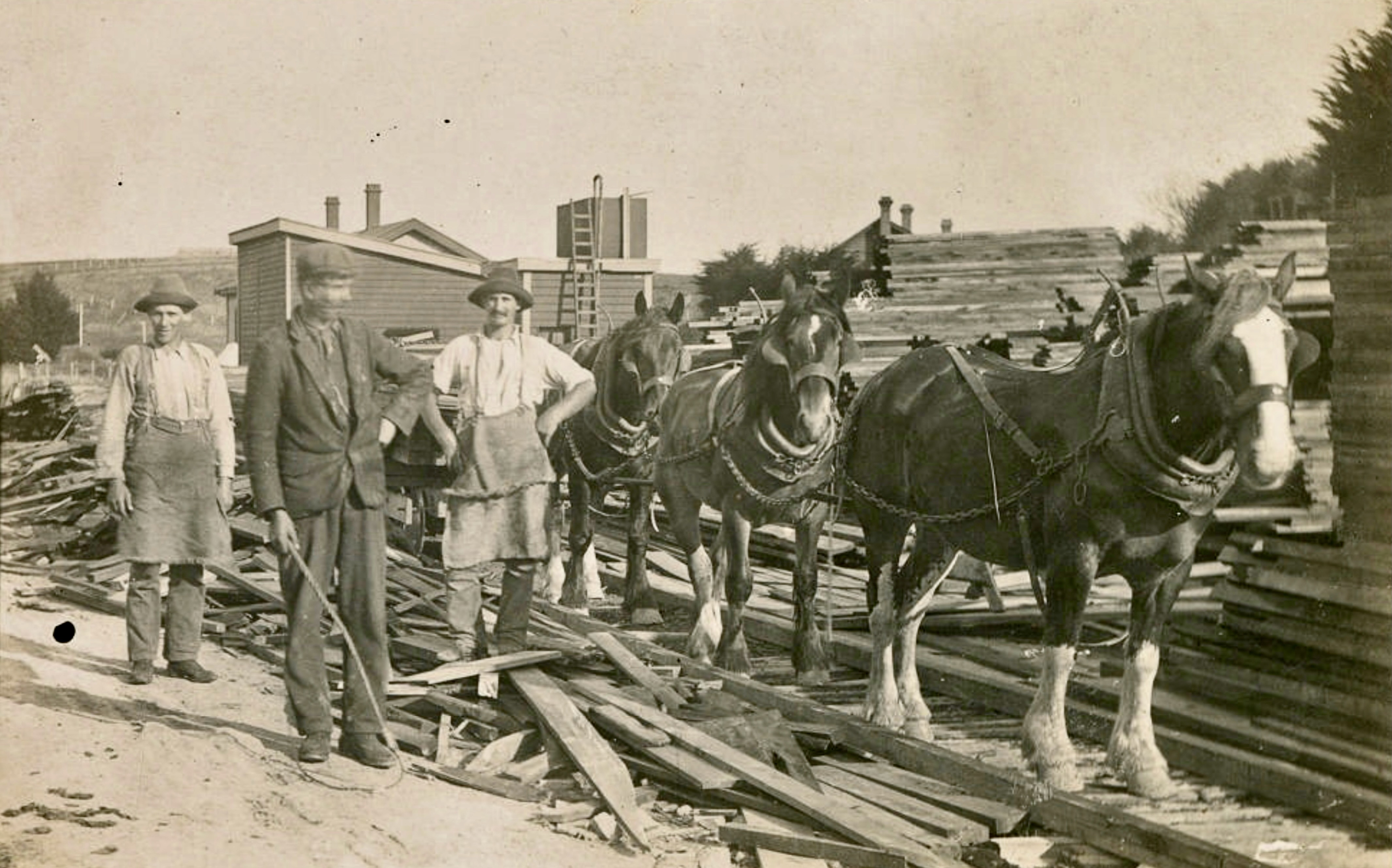
Glenham station, water tower and tramway

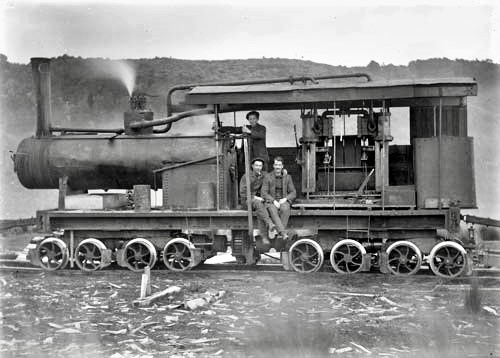
16 wheel steam locomotive

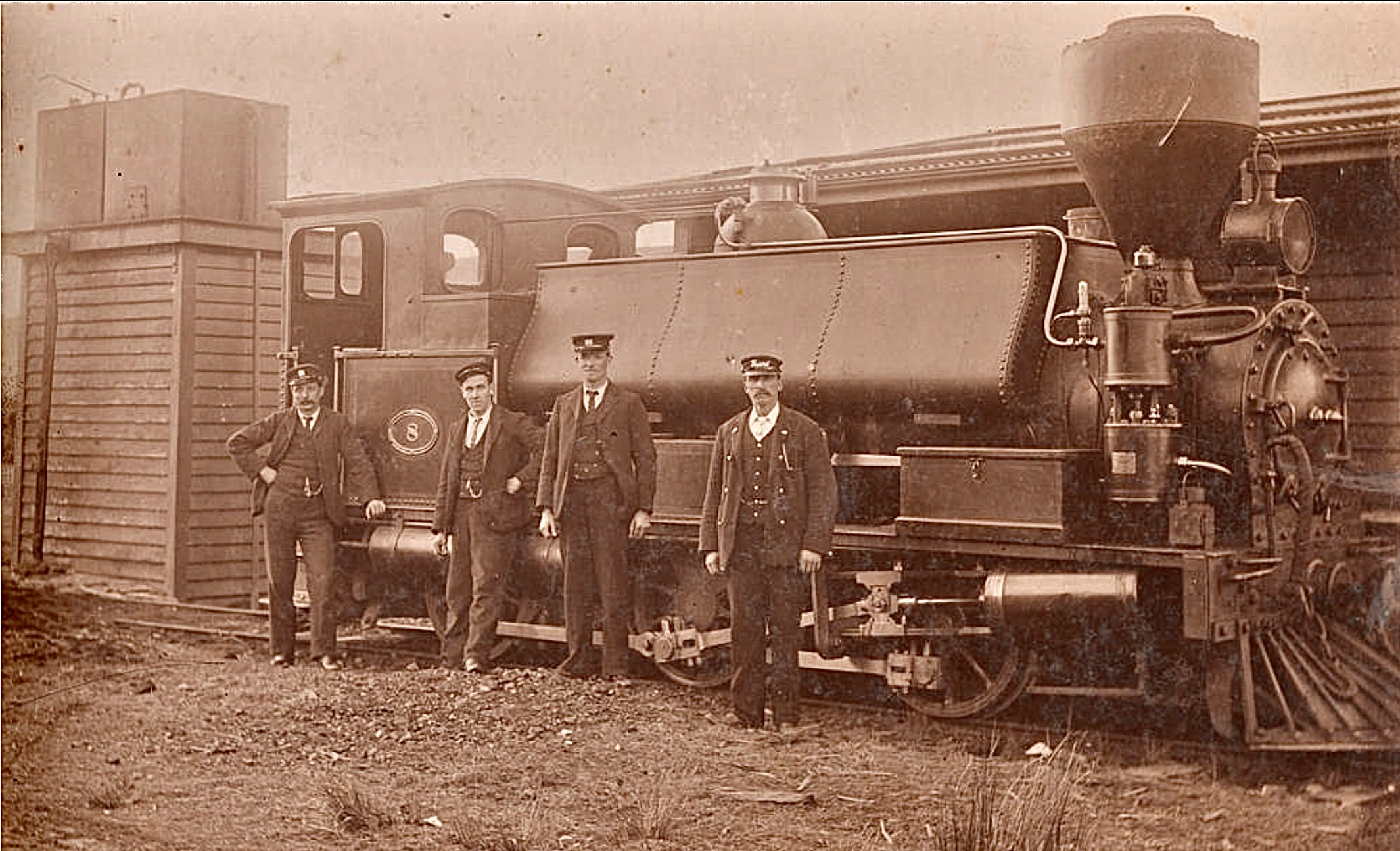
NZR F Class No.8 at Glenham, with water tower and station

== See also ==
- Main South Line
- Waimea Plains Railway
- Kingston Branch
- Mossburn Branch
- Waikaia/Switzers Branch
- Waikaka branch
