= Waikaka Branch =

Branch line railway of the Main South Line

Overview
- Status: Closed
- Owner: Railways Department
- Locale: Southland, New Zealand
- Termini: McNab; Waikaka
- Stations: 6

Service
- Type: Heavy Rail
- System: New Zealand Government Railways (NZGR)
- Operator(s): Railways Department

History
- Opened: 26 November 1908
- Closed: 9 September 1962

Technical
- Line length: 20.82 km (12.94 mi)
- Number of tracks: Single
- Character: Rural
- Track gauge: 3 ft 6 in (1,067 mm)

Map

The Waikaka Branch was a branch line railway of the Main South Line that ran through agricultural and gold-mining country in Southland, New Zealand. It was constructed in 1907 and 1908, and was operated by the New Zealand Railways Department until its closure in 1962.

== Construction ==
The Waikaka Branch was the last of the minor branches of northern Southland to be authorised, though proposals had existed for decades beforehand. Poor transportation access was causing farm values to depreciate while wagoning costs were prohibitive, and settlers petitioned the government for a railway line to improve their economic prospects. The town of Kelso had already been linked to the Dunedin-Invercargill portion of the Main South Line at Waipahi by the Tapanui Branch, but a prominent proposal supported another link, this time from Kelso via the Waikaka Valley to Gore on the Main South Line.

In 1878, this line was approved by the government and an official survey of the route was anticipated in early 1880, but governmental inaction meant that the proposal lapsed and by 1886, residents of the Waikaka Valley had lost hope that a railway would be built. The prospect of a railway was not seriously revived until 1897 when a community financing initiative in the North Island was approved to construct a line from Paeroa to Waihi (later part of the East Coast Main Trunk Railway). Pressure paid off in 1904 when a branch line to the village of Waikaka was included in the government's Railways Authorisation Act, but official procrastination meant construction did not commence.

The through line from Gore to Kelso still had support; in February 1905, Southland business interests urged the government to begin construction of the Gore-Kelso line and to link the Tapanui Branch with the Roxburgh Branch, as trade that they felt should rightfully benefit Southland was instead benefitting Otago due to superior railway access to Dunedin. No significant action was taken to achieve this proposal, but later in 1905, a company was established by local residents to advance half the construction costs of the approved branch to the government, and this led to the passage of the Waikaka Branch Railway Act.

When the promised money eventuated, construction of the line commenced on 18 April 1907, with the first sod turned by the Acting Prime Minister, Joseph Ward. The branch left the Main South Line just east of Gore at a locality called McNab. Locals under supervision rather than contractors or engineers built the line twenty-one kilometres up the valley to Waikaka, and it was completed in late 1908. On 26 November 1908, the line was handed over to the Railways Department and the official opening was held the following day.

== Stations ==
The following stations were on the Waikaka Branch (in brackets is the distance from the junction in McNab):

- Howe (2.54 km) - also called Howes.
- Willowbank (7.16 km)
- Maitland (11.79 km)
- Fleming (14.83 km)
- Pullar (16.6 km)
- Waikaka (20.82 km) - a small locomotive depot was located at the station.

== Operation ==
The branch was a typical New Zealand rural branch servicing farms. No towns or major industries existed at any point along the line. Branches such as this were useful to open up internal New Zealand to commercial farming, and the Waikaka Branch provided local farmers with invaluable access to markets before the development of modern road transportation. A daily service carrying both passengers and freight, known as a mixed train, operated from the terminus to Gore and return. The valley of the branch directly paralleled the Pomahaka Valley that was followed by the Tapanui Branch, and they were sufficiently close that locomotive crews on one branch claimed that they could see the smoke from the steam locomotive of a train in the other valley.

On 9 February 1931, regular passenger services were cancelled due to poor patronage and the locomotive depot in Waikaka was closed in an attempt to improve the branch's finances as it had been losing money for a few years. These measures temporarily improved its prospects and trains operated from Gore to Waikaka and return, but by 1950, although revenue had doubled, so had expenses. Improvements in quality and access to road transportation meant that the use of the railway by farmers decreased - by 1950, the train ran only thrice weekly, and not much later, this level of service was further reduced to twice weekly. These services were augmented by highly infrequent excursions, the most notable of which was chartered by the Waikaka Valley Presbyterian Church on 26 March 1962 to convey almost 800 passengers in 12 carriages and 2 vans to Racecourse station on the Wyndham Branch for a picnic near Wyndham. The motive power used on the service was typical of the latter decades of the branch: an A class locomotive on the service out of Waikaka, and an A^{B} class locomotive on the return working.

The line would have been a candidate for closure sometime in the early 1950s like other similar branches in New Zealand, but due to the lack of bridges or tunnels, it was ideal for carrying large, heavy items for the construction of the Roxburgh Dam. This freight sustained the line into the 1960s, but upon completion of the dam, there was not sufficient traffic to justify the branch's continued existence and it was closed on 9 September 1962.

== Today ==
Traces of the branch line's existence remain evident today. In Willowbank, a preserved windmill, wooden water tank, and a Historic Places plaque can be found at the site of the former yard. Stockyards and loading chutes can be found preserved in Fleming. The former railbed is well defined through the countryside for some of its length, and structures of obvious railway origin can be found in Waikaka, such as former Railways Department housing provided for staff based in Waikaka when its locomotive depot was operational.

== See also ==
- Main South Line
- Waimea Plains Railway
- Kingston Branch
- Mossburn Branch
- Waikaia/Switzers Branch
- Wyndham/Glenham Branch
