= John Dore (tourist operator) =

Carrier, tourist operator, government agent, explorer, guide

John Benjamin Charles Dore (29 April 1872 – 30 October 1945) was a New Zealand carrier, tourist operator, secret government agent, explorer and surgeon. He was born in Waikaia, Southland, New Zealand on 29 April 1872.
