= Waikaia =

- Interactive map of Waikaia
- Country: New Zealand
- Island: South Island
- Region: Southland region
- Territorial authorities of New Zealand: Southland District
- Ward: Mararoa Waimea Ward
- Community: Ardlussa Community
- Electorates: Southland; Te Tai Tonga (Māori)

Government
  - Territorial authority: Southland District Council
  - Regional council: Southland Regional Council
  - Mayor of Southland: Rob Scott
  - Southland MP: Joseph Mooney
  - Te Tai Tonga MP: Mananui Ramsden

Area
  - Total: 1.26 km^{2} (0.49 sq mi)

Population (June 2025)
  - Total: 110
  - Density: 87/km^{2} (230/sq mi)
- Website: www.waikaia.co.nz

Waikaia, formerly known as Switzers, is a town in the Southland region of New Zealand's South Island. From 1909 until 1959, it was the terminus of the Waikaia Branch railway. The population in the 2013 census was 99, unchanged from the previous census in 2006.

The town is in the Southland District and is covered by the Waikaia Community Development Area Sub-committee. Facilities include a museum, to which is attached an iconic "bottle house", constructed from approximately 20,000 wine bottles.

The historic Glenaray Station farm is located close to Waikaia. Several of the farms buildings are Heritage New Zealand-classified structures.

== Demographics ==
Waikaia is described as a rural settlement by Statistics New Zealand. It covers 1.26 km^{2} (0.49 sq mi), and had an estimated population of 110 as of June 2025, with a population density of 87 people per km^{2}. It is part of the much larger Riversdale-Piano Flat statistical area.

Historical population
Year	Pop.	±% p.a.
2006	114	—
2013	129	+1.78%
2018	135	+0.91%

Waikaia had a population of 135 at the 2018 New Zealand census, an increase of 6 people (4.7%) since the 2013 census, and an increase of 21 people (18.4%) since the 2006 census. There were 60 households, comprising 72 males and 63 females, giving a sex ratio of 1.14 males per female. The median age was 57.4 years (compared with 37.4 years nationally), with 21 people (15.6%) aged under 15 years, 15 (11.1%) aged 15 to 29, 48 (35.6%) aged 30 to 64, and 51 (37.8%) aged 65 or older.

Ethnicities were 97.8% European/Pākehā, 6.7% Māori, and 2.2% Asian. People may identify with more than one ethnicity.

Although some people chose not to answer the census's question about religious affiliation, 42.2% had no religion, and 48.9% were Christian.

Of those at least 15 years old, 6 (5.3%) people had a bachelor's or higher degree, and 45 (39.5%) people had no formal qualifications. The median income was $24,800, compared with $31,800 nationally. 9 people (7.9%) earned over $70,000 compared to 17.2% nationally. The employment status of those at least 15 was that 48 (42.1%) people were employed full-time, 21 (18.4%) were part-time, and 3 (2.6%) were unemployed.

== Education ==
Waikaia School is a state full primary school for years 1 to 8 with a roll of 24 as of July 2026. The school first opened in 1882. Waikaia School (originally called Switzers School) moved into the town from the hill above it about 1880, but burned down six weeks later, and was subsequently rebuilt.

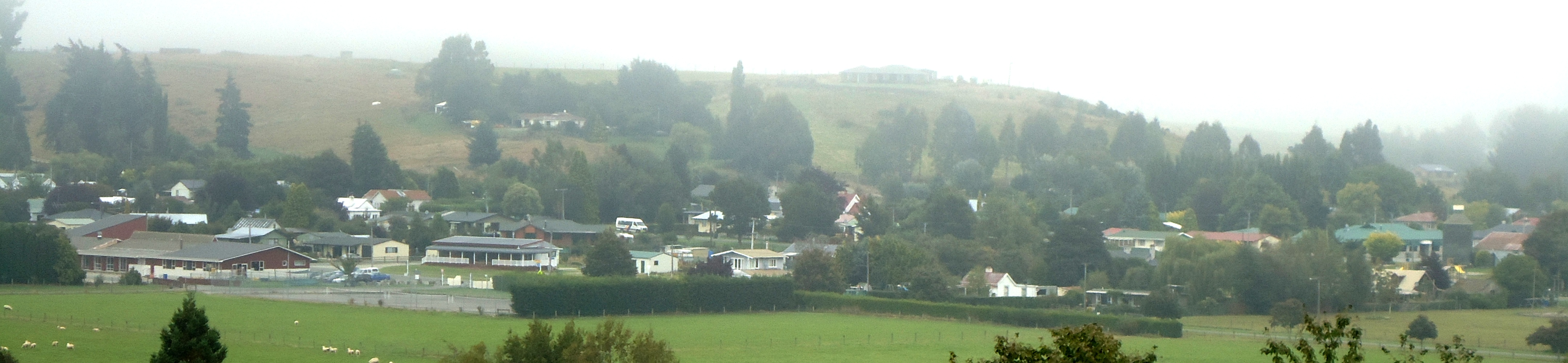

== Notable people ==
- John Benjamin Charles Dore (1872–1945), carrier, tourist operator, government agent, explorer and surgeon
- Susan Nugent Wood (1836–1880), writer
