= Kingston Flyer =

Vintage steam train in the South Island of New Zealand

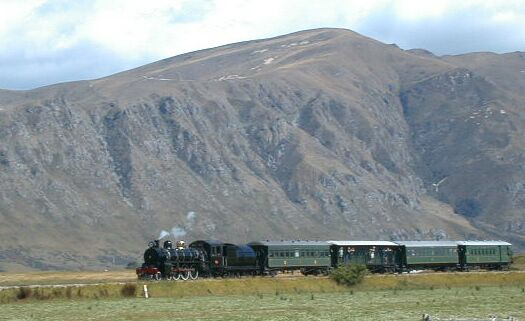
- The Kingston Flyer approaching the terminus at Fairlight with A^{B} 778, 24 December 2000
- Locale: New Zealand, Kingston, Otago
- Terminus: Kingston Station and Fairlight Station

Commercial operations
- Name: Kingston Branch
- Built by: Southland Provincial Council (to 1870); Otago Provincial Council (1870–1876); Department of Public Works (1877–1878)
- Original gauge: 3 ft 6 in (1,067 mm)

Preserved operations
- Stations: 2
- Length: 13.69 kilometres (8.51 mi)
- Preserved gauge: 3 ft 6 in (1,067 mm)

Commercial history
- 1886: Kingston Flyer name first used for train between Gore and Kingston after nationalisation of the Waimea Plains Railway.
- 4 October 1937: End of regular passenger services.
- 1957 or 1958: End of holiday season passenger services.
- 21 December 1971: Re-opened to summer season vintage trains.
- Closed to passengers: 17 April 1979
- Closed: 25 November 1979

Preservation history
- 18 December 1982: Kingston – Fairlight re-opened to summer season vintage trains.
- 1 December 1992: Operation sold to New Zealand Rail Limited
- 29 October 2011: Operation sold to private owner, David Bryce. Services restarted after a two-year lay up.

The Kingston Flyer is a vintage steam train in the South Island of New Zealand at the southern end of Lake Wakatipu. It used 14 kilometres (8.7 mi) of preserved track that once formed a part of the Kingston Branch. Originally, Kingston Flyer was a passenger express train between Kingston, Gore, Invercargill, and less frequently, Dunedin. It was operated by the New Zealand Railways (NZR) from the 1890s to 1957. In 1971, NZR revitalised the service as a tourist venture, later leasing the steam locomotives and rolling stock in 1982 to a private company. Since then, the Kingston Flyer has been through a number of owners, most recently being owned by the Kingston Flyer Limited. A group of volunteers has restored the railway, rolling stock and locomotives to service. In July 2021, the Kingston Flyer received resource consent to operate, initially for tour groups.

== History ==
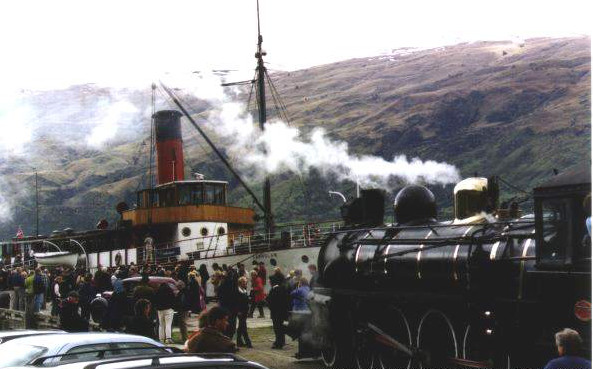
Kingston Flyer and the TSS Earnslaw at the Kingston Quay

The Kingston Flyer was introduced in the late 1890s as New Zealand recovered from the Long Depression of the 1880s. During the Long Depression, slow mixed trains that carried both passengers and freight had served the Kingston Branch and Waimea Plains Railway, daily in some years and only a few times per week in others. However, as the economy was revitalised, the Railways Department sought to increase services on the two lines. The government acquired the Waimea Plains Railway and incorporated it into the national network. The Kingston Branch ran north–south between Invercargill and Kingston, while the Waimea Plains Railway diverged from the branch in Lumsden and ran eastwards, meeting the Main South Line in Gore. Mixed services operated to a higher frequency, and dedicated passenger trains were introduced. These services came to be known as the Kingston Flyer, especially the Gore-Kingston services across the Waimea Plains.

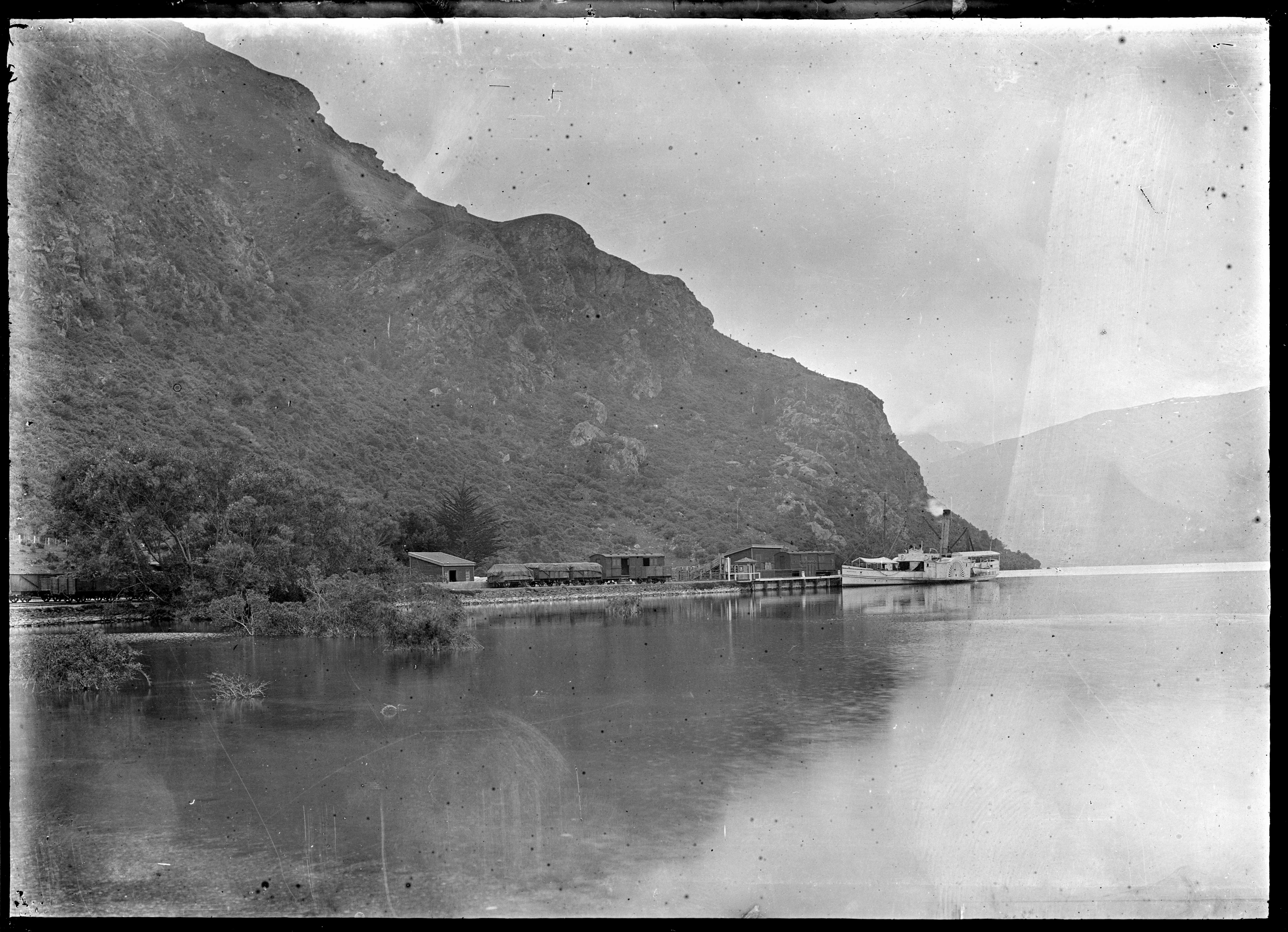
Paddle steamer at Kingston Wharf in 1926

The Flyer served Kingston every weekday. On Mondays, Wednesdays, and Fridays, it ran Kingston-Gore, where it connected with Main South Line expresses between Dunedin and Invercargill. On Tuesdays and Thursdays, it operated Kingston-Invercargill, using the length of the Kingston Branch Line. In the early years, services were typically operated by K and V class steam locomotives. At peak periods, especially Christmas and Easter, special services had to be operated to cater for demand, with some operating from Dunedin through to Kingston, where they connected with Lake Wakatipu steamboats to the popular holiday destination of Queenstown. For many years, this was the primary means of travelling to Queenstown.

=== Demise ===
In the 1930s, passenger numbers declined sharply and the New Zealand Railways Department looked to cancel its services on the Kingston Branch Line. That occurred on 4 October 1937, bringing an end to the regular Flyers. Until 17 September 1945, an abbreviated service continued to operate across the Waimea Plain to the Kingston Branch Line junction in Lumsden. Then, on both lines, the service was replaced by buses operated by the New Zealand Railways Road Services.

That was not the end of the Flyers. The timetables retained a "runs as required" Kingston Flyer, which typically operated at peak holiday periods between Gore and sometimes Dunedin to Kingston. For many years, those expresses and excursions operated in conjunction with steamers on Lake Wakatipu, to provide the primary access to Queenstown. Patronage was initially heavy, but it declined through the 1950s. 1956 was the last year when Flyers ran each way in the same day, and the final Flyer operated during the 1957 Easter holiday period.

=== Revitalisation ===
In 1971, New Zealand Railways announced that it was going to recommence operating a service named the Kingston Flyer as a heritage service. The last use of steam on a regularly scheduled revenue service in New Zealand was on 26 October 1971, and the new Kingston Flyer began operating two months later on 21 December. It utilised the section of the Kingston Branch between Lumsden and Kingston and proved wildly popular. From 1971 until 1979 it operated every summer through to the Easter holiday period and carried over 30,000 people annually. Flooding damage to the line between Lumsden and Garston meant that the last Kingston to Invercargill flyer ran on 17 April 1979 and the damaged section of track in question was formally closed in November of that year. For the next three years, the Kingston Flyer operated from Invercargill to Bluff and Wairio, albeit less successfully.

In 1982, the Kingston Flyer was returned by NZR to Kingston before the remaining line now part of the Mossburn Branch Line was closed down and removed. The initial intention was to utilise the remaining 20 kilometres of track between Garston and Kingston, but the decision was made to end the line in Fairlight and the additional six kilometres to Garston were closed. Although the original Flyers had typically been operated by locomotives of the Rogers K and V classes, two A^{B} class 4-6-2 locomotives, A^{B} 778 and A^{B} 795 were restored specifically for the Kingston Flyer.

The Kingston Flyer normally operated seven months of the year, from 1 October to 30 April. Two trains ran daily, excluding Christmas Day.

In 1992, NZR's successor, New Zealand Rail Limited (Tranz Rail from 1995), acquired Kingston Flyer Limited, which was sold again in 2003 by Toll NZ, then owners of Tranz Rail, to a private operator.

=== 2009 bankruptcy ===
In November 2008, the operation was offered for sale at $3 million as a going concern. In late August 2009, it was announced that the train would not operate again in the foreseeable future as mounting debt had forced the operation to close. Kingston Acquisitions tried to sell the train in November 2008 to repay about $4.7 million to Christchurch-based finance company Prudential.

Prudential blocked an initial offer by the United States of America-based company Railmark to buy the operation for $2.25m, the insurers refusing to accept anything less than the whole debt being cleared. Invercargill-based enthusiast Karle Barkley formed the Kingston Flyer Steam Train Trust to preserve the Flyer under the auspices of a charitable trust but was unable to raise the necessary funds to purchase the Flyer from Prudential.

In November 2009, the Flyer's owners were put into receivership and the train itself put up for sale.

In 2011, business was listed on the internet auction site TradeMe for sale with a price of NZD$2.5 million. That included the locomotives, all land associated with the railway, including the Kingston and Fairlight stations, and parts of the Kingston wharf, and several other development sites in Kingston which were not related to the railway. The business was purchased in August 2011 by businessman David Bryce who put it back in operation on 29 October 2011.

In December 2012, the Kingston Flyer was again suspended, due to the discovery of leaks in A^{B} 778's boiler and owner David Bryce's ongoing health problems. The train resumed operation once the extensive overhaul of A^{B} 795 was finished, and the business was once again put up for sale. As at December 2013 no offers had been accepted and the operation remained mothballed, the owner suggested that the Kingston Flyer could be put into a trust.

On 23 February 2017, it was announced that the Kingston Flyer and all associated land and buildings had been sold to a local consortium. Within two months it became apparent that the buyers were interested only in the land that the train runs on. Development West Coast said it was interested in buying the infrastructure and running the train on the West Coast railway network.

On 22 December 2017, it was announced that the train would remain in Kingston, and it was hoped that one A^{B} class locomotive would be operational by February 2018.

In January 2018, the Mountain Scene newspaper announced that the land of the Kingston Flyer operation would be sold off for property development, but in early February 2018, it was reported that the new owners had "big plans" for the train. At the end of 2018, it was reported that a new operator planned to restart the service "within a year".

At the start of 2020, it was reported that the train would be back in service at some time during the year. In May 2020, the new owners stated that their intention to restore the service by Summer 2020. In January 2021 the company applied for an operating consent to run trains again, but stated that it had no time-frame for when that might happen. In April 2021, the Kingston Flyer ran trains as part of Great Southern Train Tour, and in July the operation gained resource consent to operate. Initially the train will run only for group bookings during the 2021/2022 summer season, and will not run to a fixed schedule. Director of the Kingston Flyer Limited, Neville Simpson, stated that the train may run for the public on Sundays "as the engine's still warm."

=== Current status ===
On 18 September 2022, a grand reopening was held for services to be run between Kingston and Fairlight on Sundays from September to June. The service is being run voluntarily by a team of experienced train enthusiasts directed by Neville Simpson.

In the 2023/2024 season, trains were scheduled to run from September to June on Sundays at 10:30AM and 2:00PM.

== Locomotives and rolling stock ==
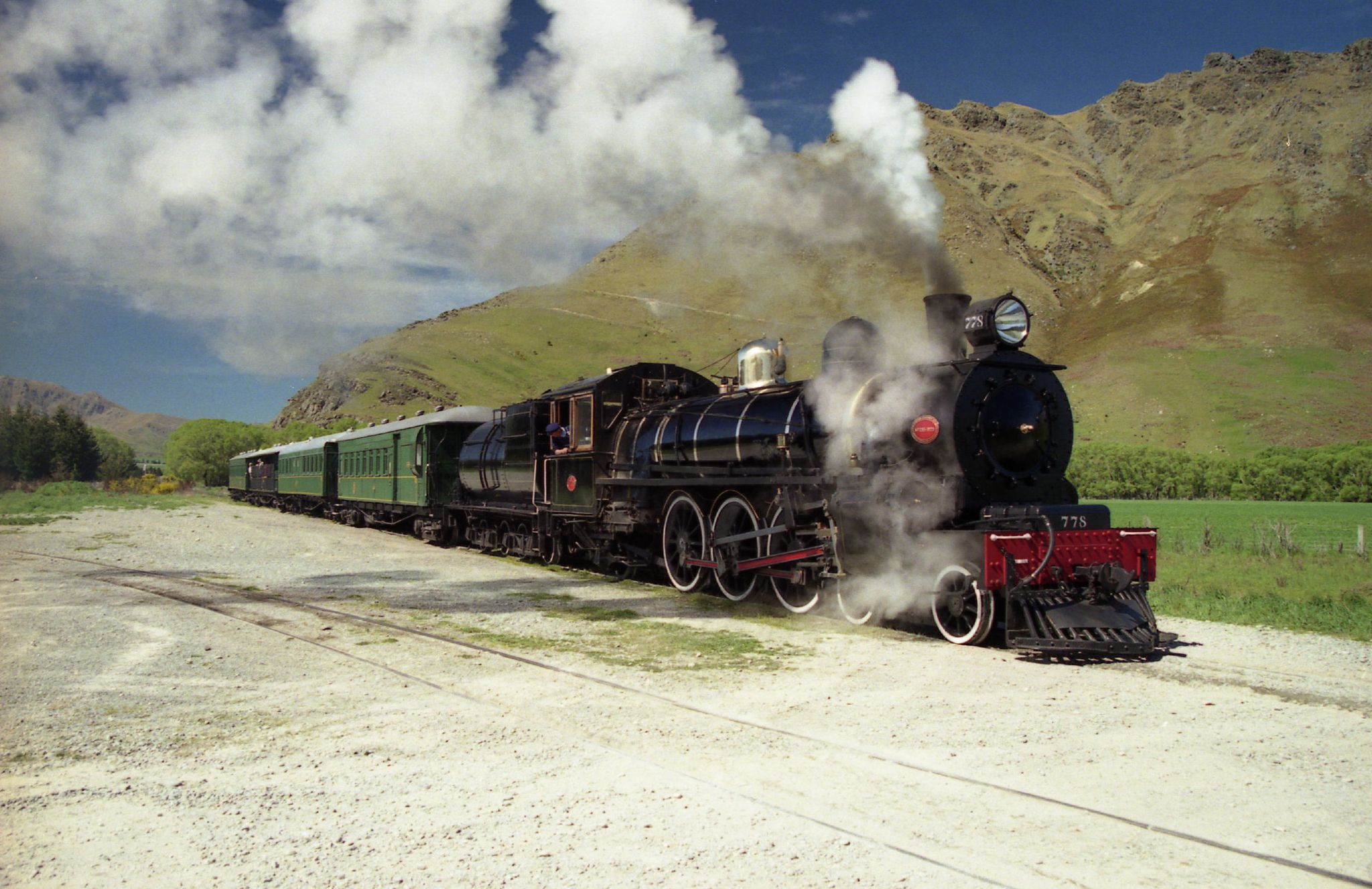
A^{B} 778 hauling the Kingston Flyer at Fairlight on 3 November 2006

The Kingston Flyer has been operated since 1971 by two A^{B} class steam locomotives:

- A^{B} 778 (entered service in 1925)
- A^{B} 795 (entered service in 1927 and once pulled the New Zealand Royal Train)

From September 2000 until 2003, K 92, a preserved member of the Rogers K class that headed the original Flyers, was based in Kingston and operated services both by itself and together with the pair of A^{B} class engines. The locomotive was owned by the Waimea Plains Railway Trust and returned briefly during 2008-09 until the bankruptcy when it was recovered by the WPRT and moved to their base at Mandeville on the old Waimea Plains Railway Trust in November that year and where it remains to date.

The Flyer also has a resident diesel shunting locomotive, TR350, a 15-ton 0-4-0 diesel-hydraulic shunting locomotive built by A & G Price of Thames. This duty had been filled since the 1990's by 0-6-0DM DSA551, which was recalled by Tranz Rail Limited in 1999 and replaced by the smaller TR class diesel shunters. The TR class was used to shunt at Kingston wharf and provide motive power for work trains during the winter shut-down. It remains there with the other locomotives and the rolling stock in the compound.

Initially, the Kingston Flyer started out with seven wooden-bodied passenger carriages:

Number	TMS Number	Builder	Year built	Carriage type
A 595	A 50702	NZR Addington	1900	47 ft 6 in (14.48 m) 'Bird-cage' gallery coach
A 1255	A50729	NZR Addington	1913	47 ft 6 in (14.48 m) passenger coach
A 1518	A50737	NZR Addington	1923	47 ft 6 in (14.48 m) passenger coach
A 1521	A50745	NZR Addington	1923	47 ft 6 in (14.48 m) passenger coach
A^{A} 1132	A50710	NZR Petone	1919	47 ft 6 in (14.48 m) passenger/refreshments coach
A^{F} 950	AF35	NZR Hillside	1906	47 ft 6 in (14.48 m) car-van
A^{F} 1172	AF41	NZR Addington	1911	47 ft 6 in (14.48 m) car-van

An eighth passenger carriage was added by Tranz Rail in 1999. 56-foot (17 m) steel-panelled passenger carriage A 1958 (TMS A56595), a former mainline passenger carriage, was transferred from the Tranz Scenic carriage pool to the Kingston Flyer to bolster capacity. That was the only new rolling stock to have been added to the fleet ever since 1971 when the heritage Flyer began running. It was the most modern passenger carriage in the fleet, although it was out of place with the other passenger carriages.

This passenger carriage was sold separately in 2015, and now can be seen on Huntingdon Street, where the new owners have placed it on a property just down from the railway line.

The Kingston Flyer also has a small collection of freight wagons, including three loaded ballast wagons and an EP class ploughing brake van. The majority of the other goods rolling stock is used for the Way and Works purposes, although there are three flatbed wagons used around the Kingston locomotive depot for maintenance purposes, primarily to hold the locomotive parts.
