= Chatton, New Zealand =

Locality on New Zealand's South Island

Coordinates: 45°59′06″S 168°55′28″E

Chatton is a locality in the eastern Southland region of New Zealand's South Island.

Chatton is part of the wider Waikaka statistical area.
