= Waimea Plains Railway =

Railway line in New Zealand

Map

The Waimea Plains Railway was a secondary railway line (not a branch line) that linked the towns of Lumsden and Gore in northern Southland, New Zealand. It skirted the Hokonui Hills, and operated as a through route between 31 July 1880 and 1 April 1971, with the short section from Lumsden to Balfour continuing as the Balfour Branch until 15 January 1978.

== Construction ==
The Waimea Plains Railway was built in order to improve communication between Dunedin and the Lake Wakatipu district. At the time, construction of the Otago Central Railway had barely begun and the only other way to reach the region by rail – the most efficient form of transport in the days before modern road transport – involved a detour south via Invercargill. The Waimea Plains Railway Company was formed in 1878 in New Zealand under the District Railways Act of 1877, and began construction on 11 January 1879. The easy terrain meant construction was swift, with the last rail laid on 24 May 1880 and the official opening a couple of months later on 21 July.

The Waimea Plains Railway Company was part of several companies speculating in land settlement in Southland set up by politicians including Robert Stout and William Larnach, along with the New Zealand Agricultural Company (set up in London in 1879) and then the New Zealand Land and Loan Company. By 1879 these companies were precarious financially, and the whole scheme was "little short of a scam". Bourke says that Governor George Grey not agreeing to purchase the Waimea Plains Railway Company in 1879 was the reason for subsequent fall of the Grey ministry. This and several other private railway companies were later purchased by the new Stout-Vogel ministry. Stout's financial affairs were covered up in 1893 by Richard Seddon, Stout's rival in the Liberal Party, provided that Stout left politics.

After some disputes with the government over ownership and distribution of profits, the government acquired the line under the District Railways Act in 1886 and integrated it in the New Zealand Railways Department on 13 November 1886, according to New Zealand Railways Geographical Mileage Table (1957) and the An Encyclopaedia of New Zealand (1966). (David Leitch and Brian Scott give the date as 31 March in Exploring New Zealand's Ghost Railways, while Geoffrey B. Churchman and Tony Hurst state 30 July in The Railways of New Zealand: A Journey Through History).

== Stations ==
The following stations were on the Waimea Plains Railway, with in brackets the distance from the junction with the Main South Line at Gore:

- Gore (0 km; 0 mi)
- Croydon (7 km; 4.3 mi)
- Otamita (12 km; 7.5 mi)
- Mandeville (17 km; 10.6 mi)
- Pyramid (24 km; 14.9 mi)
- Riversdale (29 km; 18.0 mi), junction with the Waikaia (Switzers) Branch
- Waimea (34 km; 21.1 mi)
- Kingston Crossing (38 km; 23.6 mi)
- Balfour (43 km; 26.7 mi)
- St Patricks (50 km; 31.1 mi)
- Lintley (55 km; 34.2 mi)
- Lumsden (59 km; 36.7 mi), junction with the Kingston and Mossburn Branches

== Operation ==
When the Waimea Plains Railway opened, New Zealand was slipping into the Long Depression and traffic justified trains only three days a week. As the Kingston Branch ran on Mondays, Wednesdays, and Fridays, the Waimea Plains Railway ran on Tuesdays, Thursdays, and Saturdays. When the national economy improved in the 1890s, so did services on the line, and a passenger express ran from Kingston to Gore three days a week; this became known as the "Kingston Flyer" and a tourist service now replicates this on 14 kilometres of track between Kingston and Fairlight on the Kingston Branch. Although the preserved Kingston Flyer uses two A^{B} class locomotives, the initial Flyers used K and V class engines.

Passenger numbers declined in 1937 when regular services were withdrawn on the Kingston Branch north of Lumsden, and although the possibility of railcars was considered, the line's passenger services ceased on 17 September 1945. Like the Kingston Branch, the Waimea Plains Railway had regularly seen a significant number of passenger excursions on top of normal services throughout its history, and these continued for over a decade after 1945. 1956 was the last year passenger trains ran each way on the same day over the Waimea Plains, and the last excursions came during the next year's Easter holiday period.

Freight trains initially operated out of Lumsden and ran five days a week until 1956. Services were re-organised to operate from Gore in 1959 and operated thrice-weekly. In 1930 and 1952, the line was not considered to be a branch and thus was not assessed in the branch line commissions of those two years, but in 1967, it was announced that its future was under review. The district negotiated a reprieve for three years, promising extra traffic, and DJ class diesel locomotives replaced steam locomotives on the line in January 1969, but less than 24,000 tonnes were carried annually and through trains ceased running in October 1970, replaced with two shunting services, one from Gore to Riversdale and the other from Lumsden to Kingston Crossing, leaving a 9 km gap of line unused, although the tracks were still in place and closure of most of the line came on 1 April 1971. A number of excursion trains ran on the line in its final weeks. Demolition of the line from Balfour back to Gore began in the later part of 1971. Although there were proposals to retain the line from Gore to Mandeville as an industrial siding to serve a proposed freezing works in the area, this proposal never eventuated and the line was lifted from Balfour all the way back to Gore. The last 2 km section of line from the junction points at Gore to the Gore Gravel and Crushing Company's plant was retained as an industrial siding until it too was closed on 1 October 1972. The 16 kilometres from Lumsden to a silo at Balfour remained open for the transport of wheat, but the quantity was not enough to justify the continued existence even of the truncated portion of the line, and it closed on 15 January 1978.

== Today ==
Although both nature and human development have taken their toll on what remains of the railway, some remnants survive. Some of the formation has been destroyed by farming, but much of it can still be traced. Both goods shed and passenger shelter still stand at Kingston Crossing, while at the site of Waimea station two points levers are positioned by the old loading bank. Another loading bank exists at St Patricks, complete with a mounted nameboard. In Balfour, the sealed station platform is now a part of a children's playground, and in the former junction town of Lumsden, the station building is used as a tourist centre. The other junction station in Gore remains with a platform as a stop on the Main South Line between Dunedin and Invercargill, although its passenger service (The Southerner) ceased in 2002.

== See also ==
- Main South Line
- Kingston Branch
- Mossburn Branch
- Waikaia/Switzers Branch
- Waikaka branch
- Wyndham/Glenham Branch
