= Waikaka =

Town in Southland, New Zealand

- Town
- Interactive map of Waikaka
- Coordinates: 45°55′S 169°01′E
- Country: New Zealand
- Region: Southland region
- Territorial authorities of New Zealand: Gore District
- Ward: Waikaka Ward
- Electorates: Southland; Te Tai Tonga (Māori)

Government
  - Territorial authority: Gore District Council
  - Regional council: Southland Regional Council
  - Mayor of Gore: Ben Bell
  - Southland MP: Joseph Mooney
  - Te Tai Tonga MP: Tākuta Ferris

Area
  - Total: 21.20 km^{2} (8.19 sq mi)

Population (2018 Census)
  - Total: 117
  - Density: 5.52/km^{2} (14.3/sq mi)

Waikaka is a town in Southland, New Zealand. It was a gold-mining town in the 19th century, starting in 1867 when gold was found. Over NZ£1,000,000 equivalent of gold was eventually extracted from this location. The town was served by the Waikaka branch railway.

== Demographics ==
Waikaka is in an SA1 statistical area which covers 21.20 km^{2} (8.19 sq mi). The SA1 area is part of the larger Waikaka statistical area.

Historical population of Waikaka town and surrounds
Year	Pop.	±% p.a.
2006	132	—
2013	132	+0.00%
2018	117	−2.38%

The SA1 statistical area had a population of 117 at the 2018 New Zealand census, a decrease of 15 people (−11.4%) since the 2013 census, and a decrease of 15 people (−11.4%) since the 2006 census. There were 48 households, comprising 63 males and 57 females, giving a sex ratio of 1.11 males per female. The median age was 46.4 years (compared with 37.4 years nationally), with 24 people (20.5%) aged under 15 years, 18 (15.4%) aged 15 to 29, 57 (48.7%) aged 30 to 64, and 21 (17.9%) aged 65 or older.

Ethnicities were 97.4% European/Pākehā, 2.6% Māori, and 5.1% Asian. People may identify with more than one ethnicity.

Although some people chose not to answer the census's question about religious affiliation, 41.0% had no religion, 43.6% were Christian, and 5.1% were Hindu.

Of those at least 15 years old, 12 (12.9%) people had a bachelor's or higher degree, and 21 (22.6%) people had no formal qualifications. The median income was $36,900, compared with $31,800 nationally. 12 people (12.9%) earned over $70,000 compared to 17.2% nationally. The employment status of those at least 15 was that 54 (58.1%) people were employed full-time, and 21 (22.6%) were part-time.

=== Waikaka statistical area ===
Waikaka statistical area covers 586.75 km^{2} (226.55 sq mi) and also includes Chatton and Mandeville. It had an estimated population of 1,580 as of June 2025, with a population density of 2.7 people per km^{2}.

Historical population for the statistical area
Year	Pop.	±% p.a.
2006	1,560	—
2013	1,554	−0.06%
2018	1,560	+0.08%

The statistical area had a population of 1,560 at the 2018 New Zealand census, an increase of 6 people (0.4%) since the 2013 census, and unchanged since the 2006 census. There were 582 households, comprising 840 males and 717 females, giving a sex ratio of 1.17 males per female. The median age was 39.0 years (compared with 37.4 years nationally), with 348 people (22.3%) aged under 15 years, 252 (16.2%) aged 15 to 29, 762 (48.8%) aged 30 to 64, and 192 (12.3%) aged 65 or older.

Ethnicities were 90.0% European/Pākehā, 6.0% Māori, 0.4% Pasifika, 7.5% Asian, and 1.9% other ethnicities. People may identify with more than one ethnicity.

The percentage of people born overseas was 12.5, compared with 27.1% nationally.

Although some people chose not to answer the census's question about religious affiliation, 42.1% had no religion, 47.5% were Christian, 1.2% were Hindu, 0.2% were Muslim, 0.2% were Buddhist and 1.3% had other religions.

Of those at least 15 years old, 195 (16.1%) people had a bachelor's or higher degree, and 246 (20.3%) people had no formal qualifications. The median income was $41,400, compared with $31,800 nationally. 198 people (16.3%) earned over $70,000 compared to 17.2% nationally. The employment status of those at least 15 was that 771 (63.6%) people were employed full-time, 216 (17.8%) were part-time, and 15 (1.2%) were unemployed.

== Education ==
Waikaka School is a full primary school for years 1 to 8 with a roll of 59 students as of July 2026. The school opened in 1883.
