= Kingston, New Zealand =

Kingston
- Rural settlement
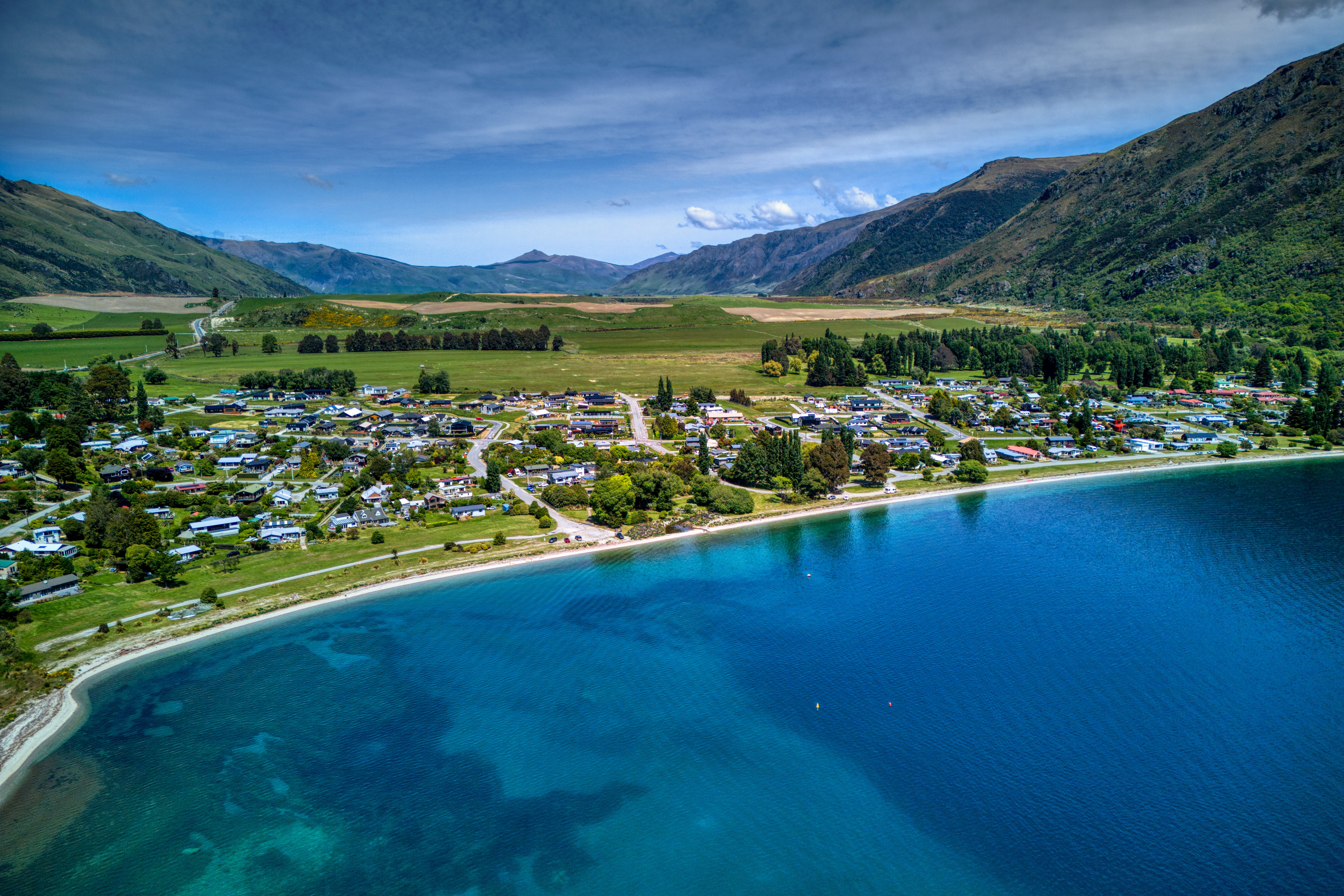
- Kingston
- Interactive map of Kingston
- Coordinates: 45°20′S 168°43′E
- Country: New Zealand
- Region: Otago
- Territorial authority: Queenstown-Lakes District
- Ward: Queenstown-Wakatipu Ward
- Electorates: Southland; Te Tai Tonga (Māori)

Government
  - Territorial authority: Queenstown-Lakes District Council
  - Regional council: Otago Regional Council
  - Mayor of Queenstown-Lakes: John Glover
  - Southland MP: Joseph Mooney
  - Te Tai Tonga MP: Tākuta Ferris

Area
  - Total: 0.60 km^{2} (0.23 sq mi)

Population (June 2025)
  - Total: 420
  - Density: 700/km^{2} (1,800/sq mi)
- Time zone: UTC+12 (NZST)
  - Summer (DST): UTC+13 (NZDT)
- Postcode: 9793
- Area code: 03
- Local iwi: Ngāi Tahu

Kingston is a small town at the southernmost end of Lake Wakatipu, just north of the border of Otago and Southland, in New Zealand's South Island. It is 47 kilometres south of Queenstown by a road, "The Devil's Staircase", which winds between the lake to the west and The Remarkables mountains to the east. It is 70 kilometres north of Lumsden, and close to the headwaters of the Mataura River.

== History ==
Kingston was originally named 'St Johns' after police commissioner St. John Branigan. Following the Otago gold rush in the 1860s, Kingston played an important role in the transport system throughout the district. The busy shipping town hosted ten hotels, two banks and several stores, and it has been reported that there was as many as 5000 people camped in the area at its peak.

== Demographics ==
Kingston is described by Statistics New Zealand as a rural settlement. It covers 0.60 km^{2} (0.23 sq mi) and had an estimated population of 420 as of June 2025, with a population density of 700 people per km^{2}. It is part of the much larger Kingston statistical area.

Historical population of the Kingston settlement
Year	Pop.	±% p.a.
2006	147	—
2013	198	+4.35%
2018	306	+9.10%

Before the 2023 census, Kingston settlement had a larger boundary, covering 2.78 km^{2} (1.07 sq mi). Using that boundary, Kingston had a population of 306 at the 2018 New Zealand census, an increase of 108 people (54.5%) since the 2013 census, and an increase of 159 people (108.2%) since the 2006 census. There were 135 households, comprising 156 males and 150 females, giving a sex ratio of 1.04 males per female. The median age was 37.5 years (compared with 37.4 years nationally), with 51 people (16.7%) aged under 15 years, 45 (14.7%) aged 15 to 29, 186 (60.8%) aged 30 to 64, and 24 (7.8%) aged 65 or older.

Ethnicities were 92.2% European/Pākehā, 5.9% Māori, 2.0% Pasifika, 2.9% Asian, and 2.0% other ethnicities. People may identify with more than one ethnicity.

Although some people chose not to answer the census's question about religious affiliation, 61.8% had no religion, 20.6% were Christian, 1.0% were Hindu, 1.0% were Buddhist and 3.9% had other religions.

Of those at least 15 years old, 66 (25.9%) people had a bachelor's or higher degree, and 33 (12.9%) people had no formal qualifications. The median income was $49,600, compared with $31,800 nationally. 54 people (21.2%) earned over $70,000 compared to 17.2% nationally. The employment status of those at least 15 was that 201 (78.8%) people were employed full-time, 24 (9.4%) were part-time, and 3 (1.2%) were unemployed.

=== Kingston statistical area ===
The Kingston statistical area covers 1,012.54 km^{2} (390.94 sq mi) and had an estimated population of 450 as of June 2025, with a population density of 0.44 people per km^{2}.

Historical population of the statistical area
Year	Pop.	±% p.a.
2006	201	—
2013	237	+2.38%
2018	348	+7.99%

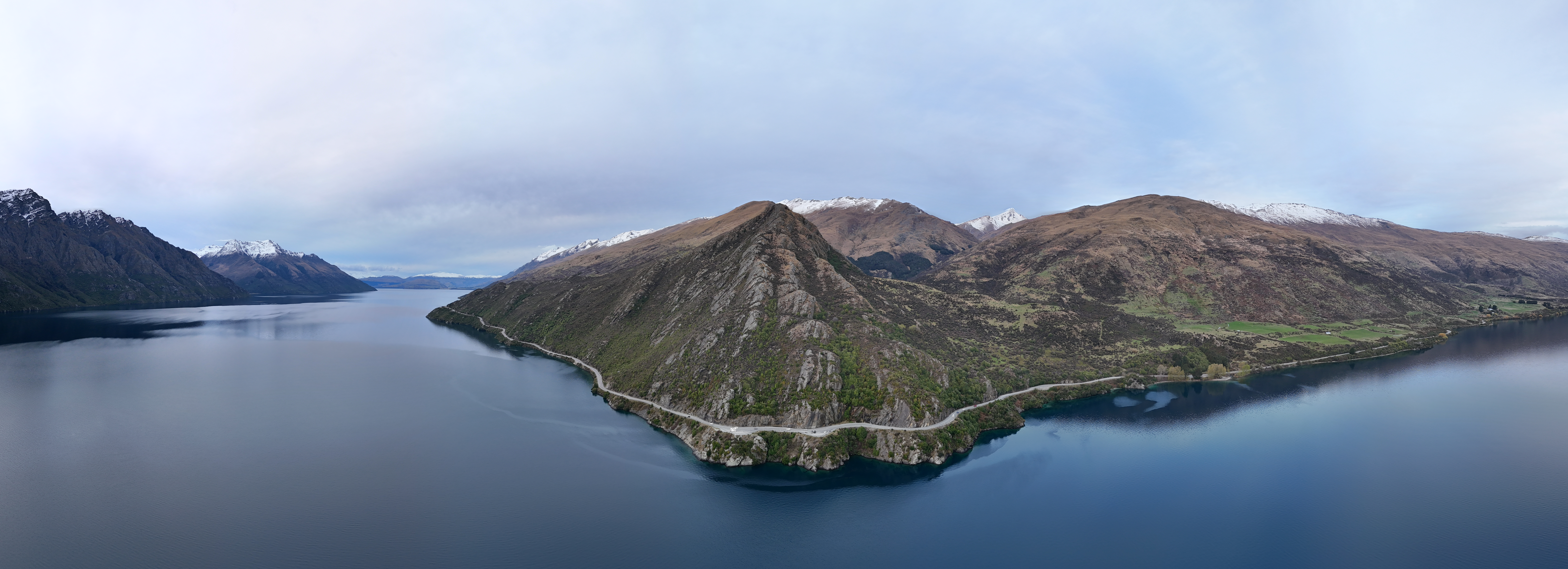
Devil's Staircase at Lake Wakatipu aerial panorama

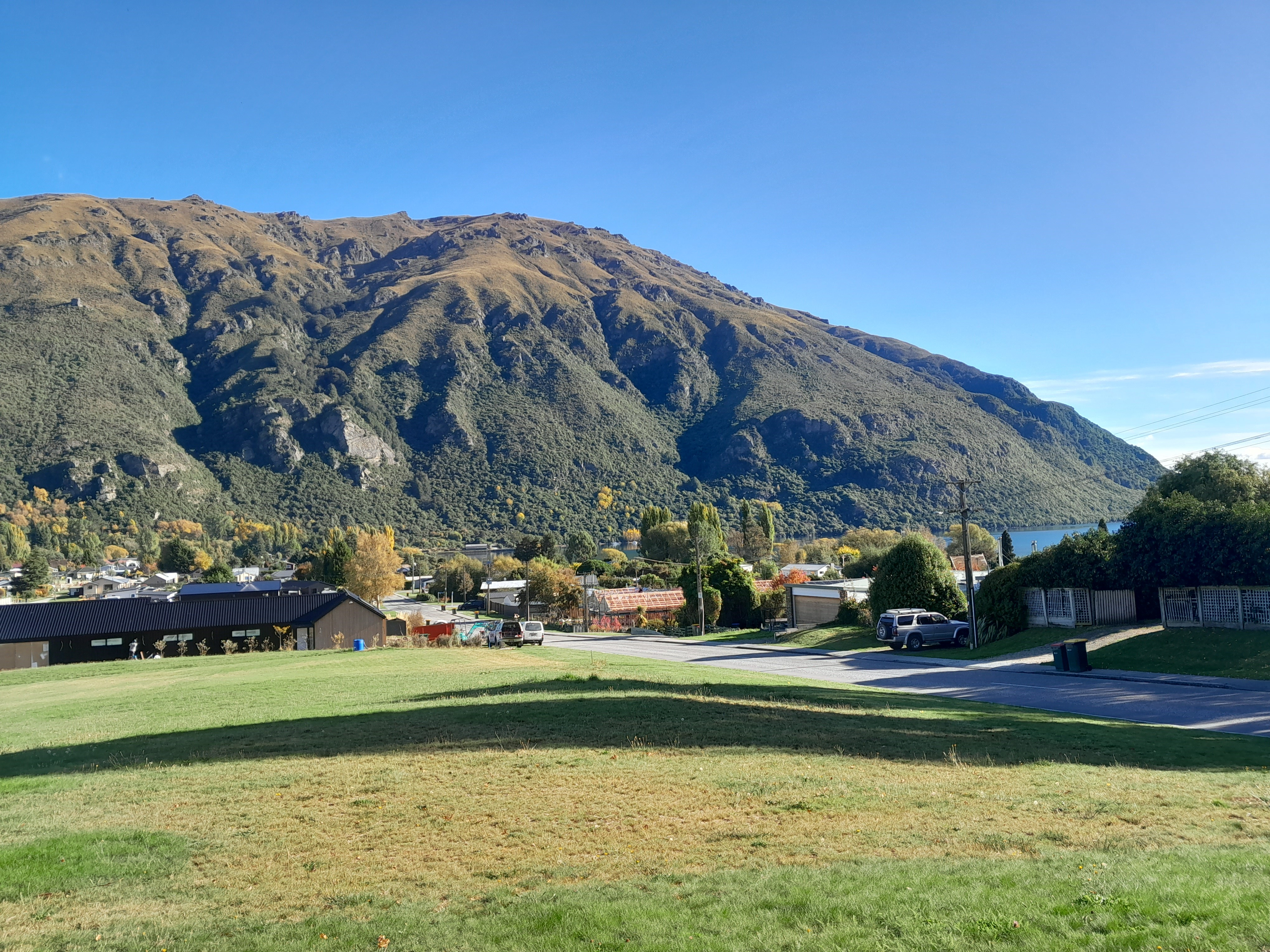
Kingston, New Zealand with Lake Wakatipu in the background (2023)

The statistical area had a population of 348 at the 2018 New Zealand census, an increase of 111 people (46.8%) since the 2013 census, and an increase of 147 people (73.1%) since the 2006 census. There were 144 households, comprising 180 males and 168 females, giving a sex ratio of 1.07 males per female. The median age was 35.4 years (compared with 37.4 years nationally), with 57 people (16.4%) aged under 15 years, 60 (17.2%) aged 15 to 29, 201 (57.8%) aged 30 to 64, and 27 (7.8%) aged 65 or older.

Ethnicities were 92.2% European/Pākehā, 6.0% Māori, 1.7% Pasifika, 4.3% Asian, and 1.7% other ethnicities. People may identify with more than one ethnicity.

The percentage of people born overseas was 25.9, compared with 27.1% nationally.

Although some people chose not to answer the census's question about religious affiliation, 62.9% had no religion, 20.7% were Christian, 0.9% were Hindu, 0.9% were Buddhist and 4.3% had other religions.

Of those at least 15 years old, 78 (26.8%) people had a bachelor's or higher degree, and 36 (12.4%) people had no formal qualifications. The median income was $49,000, compared with $31,800 nationally. 60 people (20.6%) earned over $70,000 compared to 17.2% nationally. The employment status of those at least 15 was that 228 (78.4%) people were employed full-time, 30 (10.3%) were part-time, and 3 (1.0%) were unemployed.

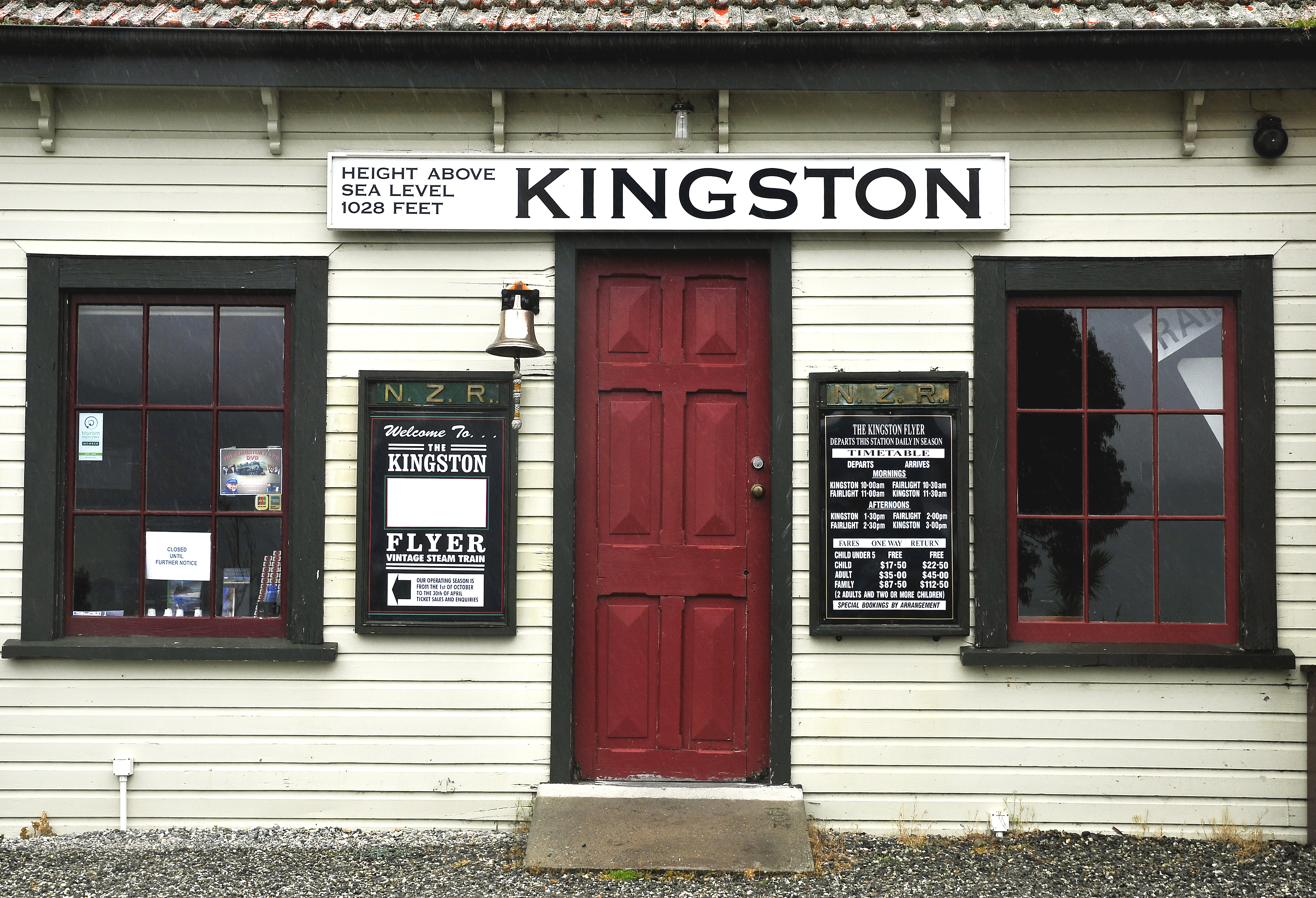
Kingston Station

== Transport ==
The Kingston Flyer historic railway service is closely associated with the town. It operated over a 14 kilometre long preserved section of the former Kingston Branch, which provided a rail link from the city of Invercargill to Kingston for over a century, opening in 1878 and closing in 1979 after a section of track between Garston and Athol was washed out in a storm.
