= Kingston Branch =

Railway line in Southland, New Zealand

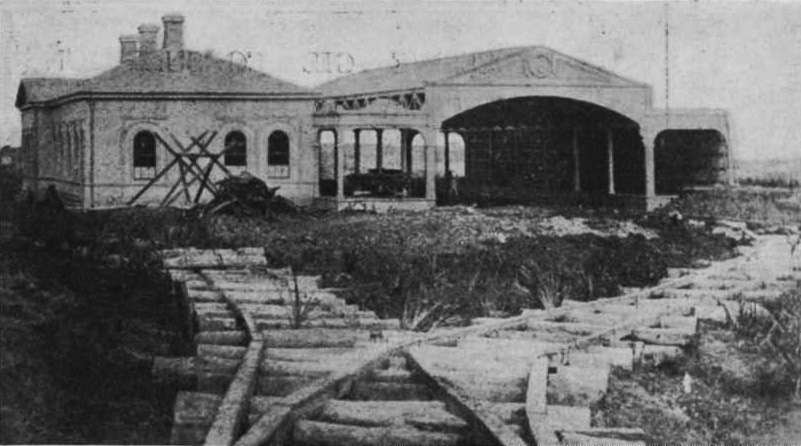
- Invercargill railway station in the 1860s with the wooden rails used on the line to Makarewa until 1867

Overview
- Status: Closed (Makarewa to Fairlight)
- Owner: Railways Department
- Locale: Southland, New Zealand
- Coordinates: 45.3676°S 168.6761°E
- Termini: Invercargill; Kingston
- Stations: 34 (total); 2 (operational)

Service
- Type: regional rail
- System: New Zealand Government Railways
- Operator(s): Railways Department; KiwiRail (Invercargill to Makarewa); The Kingston Flyer (Fairlight to Kingston)

History
- Opened: 18 October 1864 (Invercargill to Makarewa); 22 February 1871 (Makarewa to Winton); 1875 (Winton to Lumsden); 10 July 1878 (Lumsden to Kingston)
- Closed: 25 November 1979 (Mararoa Junction to Fairlight); 13 December 1982 (Makarewa to Mararoa); 31 July 2025 (Lorneville to Makarewa)

Technical
- Line length: 139.92 km (86.94 mi)
- Number of tracks: single
- Character: Secondary Main Line
- Track gauge: 4 ft 8 1/2 in (1,435 mm) (until 20 December 1875); 3 ft 6 in (1,067 mm) (20 December 1875 to present)

Map

The Kingston Branch was a major railway line in Southland, New Zealand. It formed part of New Zealand's national rail network for over a century: construction began in 1864, Kingston was reached in 1878, and it closed in 1979. For much of its life, it was considered a secondary main line rather than a branch line, and in its earlier years, it was sometimes known as the "Great Northern Railway". The southern portion now forms a part of the Wairio Branch, while the northernmost 14 kilometres (8 3/4 mi) was used by the Kingston Flyer.

== Construction ==
The Kingston Branch was built to be a main line north from Invercargill to improve communications through the Southland region, and to provide a link to the Central Otago gold fields. The provincial government of Southland was not very wealthy, and for this reason, a proposal claiming that the railway would be cheaper if built with wooden rails was accepted. A 12-kilometre (7 1/2 mi) line between Invercargill and Makarewa was opened on 18 October 1864, and the unsuitability of the wooden tracks became obvious quickly. Unlike most railway lines in New Zealand, this route was built to the international standard gauge of 1,435 mm (4 ft 8 1/2 in), and in June 1866 the decision was made to convert to iron rails. This conversion was performed at the same time as the line was extended to Winton and it opened on 22 February 1871.

This proved to be the farthest extent of the 1,435 mm (4 ft 8 1/2 in) gauge in Southland. Southland Province had been re-absorbed into Otago Province in 1870, which was itself abolished in 1876. The central government legislated that all further lines were built to the nationally accepted narrow gauge of 1,067 mm (3 ft 6 in). The first portion of the Kingston Branch built to the new gauge was from Winton to Caroline, which opened on 20 October 1875, two months before the rest of the line to Invercargill was converted to the new gauge, on 20 December. The 1,435 mm (4 ft 8 1/2 in) locomotives and rolling stock were now surplus and sold to the government of New South Wales in Australia, but the ship on which they were carried was wrecked in Westland and thus the trains never made it to Australia.

Beyond Caroline, construction was swift. The railway opened to Lumsden on 7 February 1876 and then Lowther on 15 January 1877, Athol on 20 January 1878, and finally Kingston on 10 July 1878, some 140 kilometres (87 mi) from Invercargill. In February 1879, a steamboat connection on Lake Wakatipu was established, from Kingston to Queenstown.

== Stations ==
There were 31 stations on the Kingston Branch, three of which were junctions with other lines:

Station	Connecting line(s)
Makarewa	Tuatapere (Orawia) Branch (along which was the junction with the Wairio Branch)
Winton	Hedgehope (Browns) Branch
Lumsden	Waimea Plains Railway to the Main South Line in Gore, and the Mossburn Branch

== Operation ==
In the early days of the line, trains operated six days a week, with a return service to Kingston and another in the afternoon as far as Lumsden. When the Waimea Plains Railway opened, it was privately owned and competed with the Kingston Branch, and this, along with the effects of the Long Depression, meant services were reduced to operating on Mondays, Wednesdays, and Fridays only for three years. In 1883, the daily trains were back, and when the Waimea Plains Railway was purchased and incorporated into the national network, services were further re-organised. Besides the daily "mixed" services that carried both passengers and freight, five passenger expresses a week ran from Kingston: two used the whole line to Invercargill, while three left it in Lumsden to travel through the Waimea Plains. These passenger services were the first "Kingston Flyer".

When reviews of all of New Zealand's branch railways were conducted in 1930 and 1952, the Kingston route was considered a mainline and therefore not assessed. After a railcar service was briefly considered in the 1930s, regular passenger services were cancelled, though seasonal excursions and holiday trains ran for another two decades. The last one ran in Easter 1957, and passenger trains were a very rare sight on the Kingston line in the 1960s. Not long before the seasonal excursions ended, so did another service: the Friday mixed train between Invercargill and Lumsden ceased running in November 1956. The line then settled into a pattern of daily freight trains from Lumsden to Invercargill and return, augmented by a twice-weekly service onwards to Kingston.

Traffic on the section from Lumsden to Kingston was in serious decline by 1970, but a revival in traffic came when New Zealand Railways made a surprise announcement that it would be operating a heritage train from Lumsden to Kingston re-using the "Kingston Flyer" name. Two A^{B} class locomotives were employed to operate the train, which commenced on 21 December 1971, two months after regular steam workings had ceased. Two return trips were run a day from December to April and they proved to be wildly popular, carrying over 30,000 passengers per season. Freight was carried on the first train to Kingston and last to Lumsden.

The line between Lumsden and Garston was damaged by flooding in February 1979, and the last Kingston Flyer from Garston ran not long afterwards, on 17 April 1979. The last goods train to Kingston, hauled by D^{J} 1228, ran on 22 November. Official closure of the line between Lumsden and Garston came on 26 November 1979. For the next three years, the Kingston Flyer ran elsewhere, but in 1982, it came back to Kingston. There were initially plans to operate it all the way to Garston, but these were later changed to Fairlight and the six kilometres between Garston and Fairlight was closed. The 14 kilometres (8 3/4 mi) between Fairlight and Kingston is still open for the Kingston Flyer. There are proposals to relay track back to Garston as the rail corridor is still designated for rail use.

South of Lumsden, the Kingston Branch Line was busy with trains heading to the Mossburn Branch with materials for various development schemes, the most prominent being the Manapouri hydro scheme. Once this traffic ceased the line became very quiet indeed with just two trains a week in its last year of existence. On 13 December 1982, the line from Makarewa to Lumsden was closed, the same day as the Mossburn Branch Line. The 12-kilometre (7 1/2 mi) section from Invercargill to Makarewa remains open, incorporated into the Wairio Branch Line.

== Today ==
The two ends of what was once a mainline remain open, while relics of the large middle section have disappeared with the time and the impact of development. For example, the triangular platform at Makarewa that once served Kingston and the Wairio Branch Line, as well as the large freezing works, disappeared sometime between 1995 and 1998. The last rails in the yard were lifted when the freezing works was demolished. From here to Winton the formation has been removed due to intensive dairy farming. From Winton to Centre Bush, little remains except for the formation and the occasional minor bridge; the first goods shed still standing is located at the site of the old Centre Bush yard. Well-preserved remnants can be found in Lumsden, including the water tower, a little trestle bridge, and the station building that is now used as a tourist centre. From just north of Lumsden to Fairlight the Around the Mountains Cycle Trail mostly follows the old railway line. In Lowther, the loading bank remains, and not too far away some rails are embedded in the old level crossing site on Ellis Road. Another level crossing is intact in Athol, and one of the farthest north relics of the line is found just outside Garston, the old combined road/rail bridge. Just south of Garston the old goods shed can be seen against the bottom of a hill, where it was moved to after the line's closure. At the old Fairlight bridge crossing, the line is still in use as the southern terminal of the Kingston Flyer.

== See also ==
- Main South Line
- Waimea Plains Railway
- Mossburn Branch
- Waikaia/Switzers Branch
- Waikaka branch
- Wyndham/Glenham Branch
- Kingston Flyer
- Rail transport in New Zealand
