= Gore, New Zealand =

Gore Māruawai (Māori)
- Town
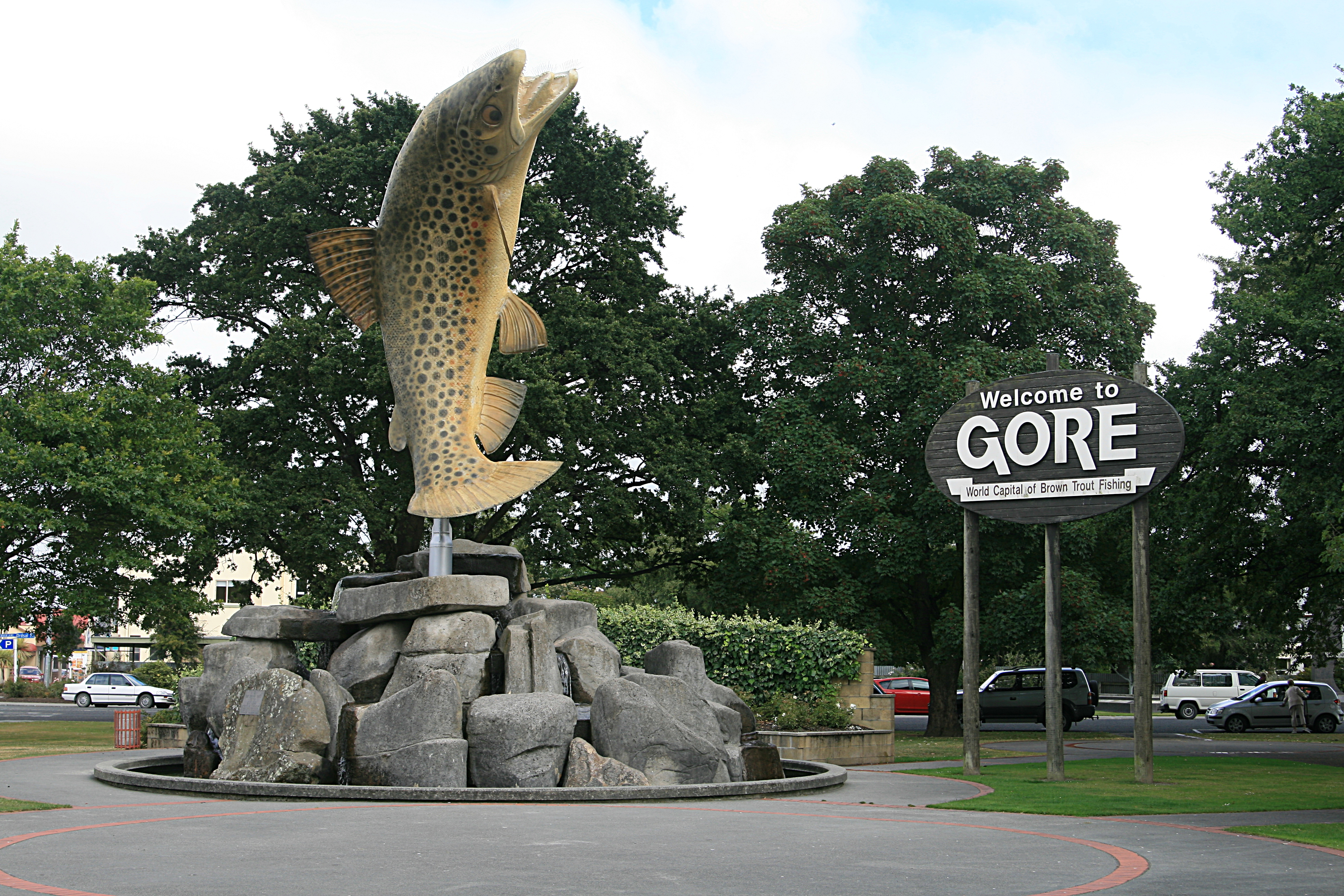
- Sculpture of the brown trout named Trevor at the northern entrance to Gore
- Interactive map of Gore
- Coordinates: 46°05′57″S 168°56′47″E
- Country: New Zealand
- Region: Southland region
- Territorial authorities of New Zealand: Gore District
- Ward: Gore Ward
- Electorates: Southland; Te Tai Tonga (Māori)

Government
  - Territorial authority: Gore District Council
  - Regional council: Southland Regional Council
  - Mayor of Gore: Ben Bell
  - Southland MP: Joseph Mooney
  - Te Tai Tonga MP: Tākuta Ferris

Area
  - Total: 13.76 km^{2} (5.31 sq mi)

Population (June 2025)
  - Total: 8,310
  - Density: 604/km^{2} (1,560/sq mi)
- Time zone: UTC+12 (NZST)
  - Summer (DST): UTC+13 (NZDT)
- Postcode(s): 9710
- Area code: 03
- Local iwi: Ngāi Tahu
- Website: www.GoreDC.govt.nz

Gore (Māori: Māruawai) is a town and district in the Southland region of the South Island of New Zealand. It has a resident population of 8,310 as of June 2025. Gore is known for its country music scene and hosts an annual country music festival. The town is also surrounded by farmland and is an important centre for agriculture in the region.

== Geography ==
The town of Gore is located on State Highway 1, 64 kilometres northeast of Invercargill and 70 km west of Balclutha – Dunedin and Invercargill are the nearest cities. The Gore District has a resident population of 12,950 (June 2025). The urban area estimated resident population in June 2025 was 8,310, the second largest in Southland. Gore is a service town for the surrounding farm communities. It is divided by the Mataura River into Gore and East Gore, the majority of the town being situated on the western banks of the river. The town is situated on the eastern edge of the Hokonui Hills, and many of its surrounding farmlands are located within foothills.

The Main South Line railway from Christchurch to Invercargill runs through the town, though passenger services ceased in 2002 with the cancellation of the Southerner. Gore was once a busy railway junction; the Waimea Plains Railway ran west to connect with the Kingston Branch in Lumsden, while the Waikaka Branch connected with the Main South Line nearby in McNab. The original Kingston Flyer ran between Gore, on the main Dunedin-Invercargill line, and Kingston, from where lake steamers provided a connection with Queenstown. It was withdrawn in 1937, although specials continued into the 1950s. The 1970s revival of the Flyer did not include Gore.

== History ==
Before the arrival of Europeans the current site of Gore was a part of or near the routes used by Māori travellers. Tuturau, near modern Mataura, was the nearest Māori settlement. In 1836 southern Māori repelled a raid from the north, which provided sufficient security for Europeans to purchase land and settle in the area. By the mid-1850s large tracts nearby had been converted into sheep runs.

As crossing the Mataura River involved a long fording, the locality became known as "the Long Ford", or Longford. In 1862 a few town sections were surveyed on the west bank of the river and Longford was named Gore as a compliment to Sir Thomas Gore Browne, an early Governor of New Zealand. One of the first buildings was Long Ford House an accommodation house opened by local sawmill owner Daniel Morton.

A village named Gordon after Governor Sir Arthur Gordon became established on the opposite bank of the Mataura. By 1864 a road from Balclutha through Gore to Invercargill had been opened for wheeled traffic which allowed the establishment of a regular coach service between Invercargill and Dunedin.

=== Establishment ===
By 1877, there were enough business opportunities in the area for the Bank of New Zealand to establish a branch in Gore. Within three years both the Bank of Australasia and the Colonial Bank of New Zealand had also opened branches. In 1899 the Bank of New South Wales followed suit.

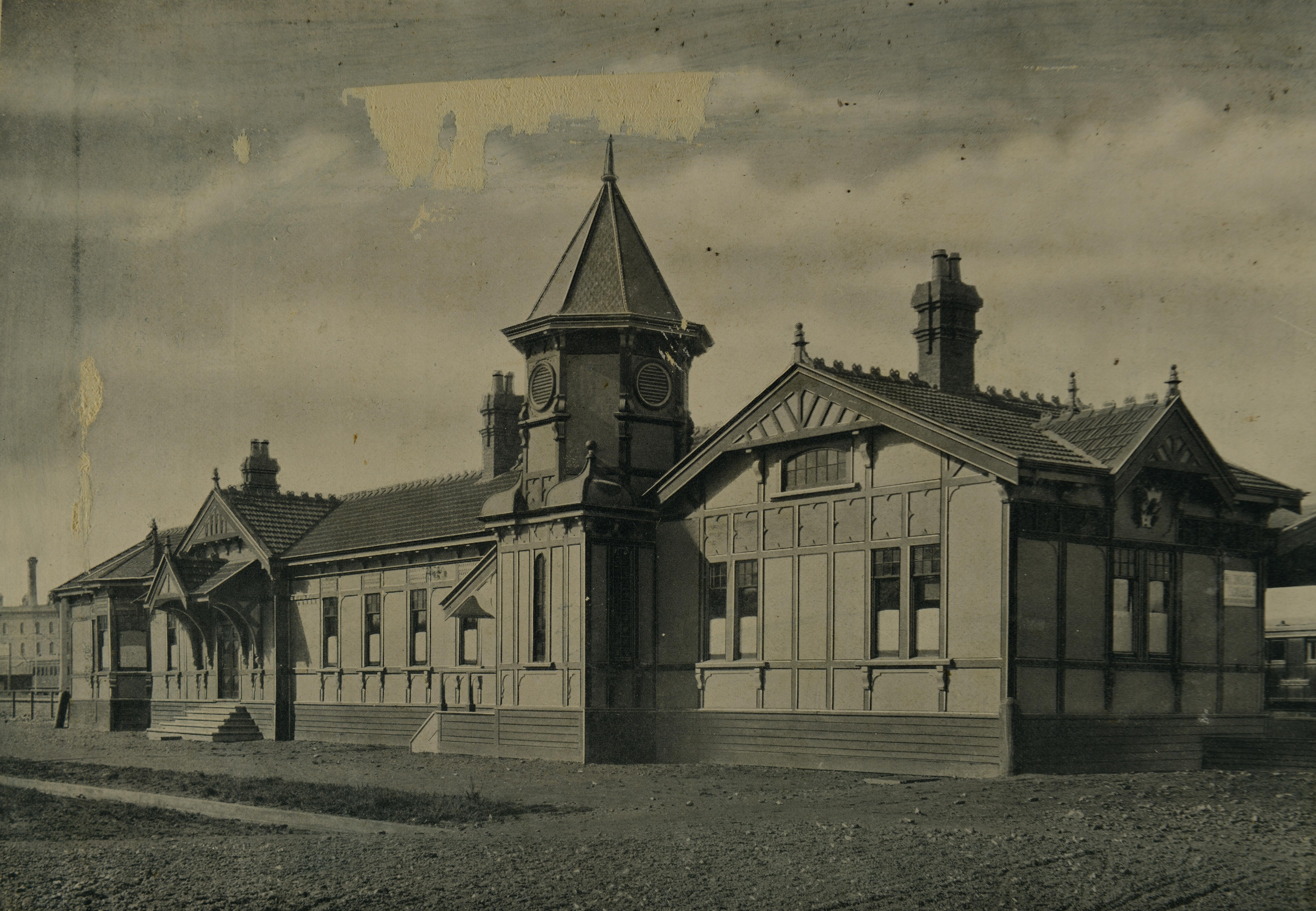
Gore Railway Station c. 1887–1915

After its construction began in the early 1870s, a railway line between Invercargill and Gore was opened on 30 August 1875. By 22 January 1879 the railway had been extended to Balclutha where it linked with an existing line to Dunedin. A private Waimea Plains railway from Gore to Lumsden was opened on 31 July 1880. This was subsequently purchased by the Government in 1886. It connected Gore with the Invercargill-Kingston branch line. By 1908 another branch had been completed via McNab to Waikaka. The extension of the railways established Gore as an important hub and had a significant effect on its development.

By 1879, The Ensign newspaper was being published in the town, followed in 1887 by the rival Standard.

=== Borough ===
In 1885, Gore was constituted a borough and in 1890 Gordon, by now commonly known as East Gore, amalgamated with Gore. Gore acquired a nickname of "Chicago of the South".

By 1905, the population had increased to 2,354, compared with 1,618 in 1891.

The establishment of the Gore Electric Light & Power Syndicate led in 1894 to Gore becoming the third town in New Zealand to install a generator and provide a public electricity supply.

From the end of the Second World War until 1976, Gore enjoyed prosperity driven by record prices for agricultural produce which saw the town's population rise from 5,000 in 1945 to 9,000 in 1976. By the late 1960s, it was reputed to have the highest per-capita retail turnover of any New Zealand town.

=== Prosperity ===
The farm sector went into decline after 1976 which led to a corresponding decline in the population. Related businesses also closed, including the town's iconic cereal mill in 2001, which had processed oats and other grains since 1877. Since 2000 prosperity has returned as large numbers of farms in the surrounding area were converted to dairy farms to take advantage of high prices for dairy produce. This growth has led to low unemployment in the town.

=== Marae ===
O Te Ika Rama Marae is in Gore. It is a marae (meeting ground) of the Hokonui Rūnanga branch of Ngāi Tahu, and includes O Te Ika Rama wharenui (meeting house).

In October 2020, the government committed $424,567 from the Provincial Growth Fund to upgrade the marae, creating eight jobs.

== Demographics ==
Gore covers 13.76 km^{2} (5.31 sq mi) and had an estimated population of 8,310 as of June 2025, with a population density of 604 people per km^{2}.

Historical population
Year	Pop.	±% p.a.
2006	7,755	—
2013	7,692	−0.12%
2018	7,911	+0.56%

Gore had a population of 7,911 at the 2018 New Zealand census, an increase of 219 people (2.8%) since the 2013 census, and an increase of 156 people (2.0%) since the 2006 census. There were 3,360 households, comprising 3,807 males and 4,107 females, giving a sex ratio of 0.93 males per female, with 1,389 people (17.6%) aged under 15 years, 1,314 (16.6%) aged 15 to 29, 3,324 (42.0%) aged 30 to 64, and 1,884 (23.8%) aged 65 or older.

Ethnicities were 90.4% European/Pākehā, 11.7% Māori, 0.9% Pasifika, 2.6% Asian, and 1.5% other ethnicities. People may identify with more than one ethnicity.

The percentage of people born overseas was 8.8, compared with 27.1% nationally.

Although some people chose not to answer the census's question about religious affiliation, 47.7% had no religion, 43.1% were Christian, 0.6% had Māori religious beliefs, 0.3% were Hindu, 0.3% were Muslim, 0.2% were Buddhist and 0.8% had other religions.

Of those at least 15 years old, 612 (9.4%) people had a bachelor's or higher degree, and 1,938 (29.7%) people had no formal qualifications. 702 people (10.8%) earned over $70,000 compared to 17.2% nationally. The employment status of those at least 15 was that 3,075 (47.1%) people were employed full-time, 960 (14.7%) were part-time, and 183 (2.8%) were unemployed.

Individual statistical areas
Name	Area (km^{2})	Population	Density (per km^{2})	Households	Median age	Median income
Gore North	1.73	1,713	990	693	46.6 years	$30,900
Gore West	3.16	2,697	853	1,119	43.1 years	$32,100
East Gore	3.70	1,443	390	594	37.9 years	$28,200
Gore Central	1.03	180	175	105	59.6 years	$21,900
Gore Main	0.61	1,251	2,051	606	58.6 years	$24,300
Gore South	3.54	627	177	243	44.2 years	$29,300
New Zealand					37.4 years	$31,800

== Climate ==
In Köppen-Geiger climate classification system, it has an oceanic climate.

Climate data for Gore (1991–2020 normals, extremes 1907–present)
Month	Jan	Feb	Mar	Apr	May	Jun	Jul	Aug	Sep	Oct	Nov	Dec	Year
Record high °C (°F)	35.0 (95.0)	34.1 (93.4)	32.2 (90.0)	27.8 (82.0)	23.3 (73.9)	20.0 (68.0)	18.3 (64.9)	23.9 (75.0)	24.4 (75.9)	27.2 (81.0)	30.0 (86.0)	34.7 (94.5)	35.0 (95.0)
Mean daily maximum °C (°F)	19.4 (66.9)	19.2 (66.6)	17.5 (63.5)	14.7 (58.5)	11.9 (53.4)	9.1 (48.4)	8.6 (47.5)	10.4 (50.7)	12.8 (55.0)	14.4 (57.9)	16.0 (60.8)	18.2 (64.8)	14.4 (57.8)
Daily mean °C (°F)	14.5 (58.1)	14.3 (57.7)	12.7 (54.9)	10.3 (50.5)	7.9 (46.2)	5.5 (41.9)	4.8 (40.6)	6.4 (43.5)	8.4 (47.1)	9.9 (49.8)	11.3 (52.3)	13.4 (56.1)	10.0 (49.9)
Mean daily minimum °C (°F)	9.6 (49.3)	9.4 (48.9)	7.8 (46.0)	5.8 (42.4)	3.9 (39.0)	1.9 (35.4)	1.0 (33.8)	2.4 (36.3)	4.0 (39.2)	5.4 (41.7)	6.7 (44.1)	8.6 (47.5)	5.5 (42.0)
Record low °C (°F)	−1.1 (30.0)	−1.1 (30.0)	−1.7 (28.9)	−4.2 (24.4)	−6.1 (21.0)	−7.8 (18.0)	−8.3 (17.1)	−8.9 (16.0)	−5.6 (21.9)	−3.4 (25.9)	−1.7 (28.9)	−1.7 (28.9)	−8.9 (16.0)
Average rainfall mm (inches)	92.7 (3.65)	77.9 (3.07)	73.0 (2.87)	70.8 (2.79)	75.9 (2.99)	78.2 (3.08)	59.1 (2.33)	60.0 (2.36)	65.7 (2.59)	88.4 (3.48)	89.2 (3.51)	87.8 (3.46)	918.7 (36.18)
Source: NIWA

== Media ==
The FM Hokonui radio station broadcasts from Gore to listeners in Southland and South Otago.

The smaller, locally owned radio station Cave FM broadcasts in Gore and online.

== Education ==
Gore has primary, intermediate and high schools.

The two secondary schools in Gore are:

- Māruawai College is the largest school in Gore, and caters for years 7 to 13. It has a roll of 603 students. It opened in 2024 as a result of the voluntary merger of Gore High School (established in 1908) and Longford Intermediate School (established in 1972).
- St Peter's College is a state-integrated Roman Catholic school for years 7 to 13 with a roll of 350. It opened in 1969 as a private school, and became state-integrated in 1982.

There are four primary schools in Gore, each serving years 1 to 6.

- East Gore School with 122 students. The school opened in 1886 as Gordon School, and took its current name in 1907.
- Gore Main School with 204 students. It opened on 4 October 1878 with 40 pupils, but was destroyed by fire on 3 July 1896. It was destroyed by fire again on 7 May 1920 and a replacement opened in February 1922. With the existing structure reaching the end of its useful life, the school was rebuilt again on 7 December 1984.
- St Marys School, a state-integrated Catholic school with 196 students. It opened in 1890.
- West Gore School with 149 students. It opened in 1953.

All these schools are coeducational. Rolls are as of July 2026.

== Culture and arts ==
Gore is well known for its connection with Country and Western music, with the annual New Zealand country music awards, the Gold Guitar Awards having been held in the town since 1974. It has a sister city relationship with Tamworth, New South Wales, the "Country Music Capital of Australia".

Gore has also gained a reputation as a centre for the visual arts in the southern South Island. A major bequest to the town's Eastern Southland Art Gallery by John Money has left the institution with one of the country's best collections of ethnological art. This is partnered by a collection of modern New Zealand work, including several notable pieces by Ralph Hotere.

== Landmarks and notable features ==
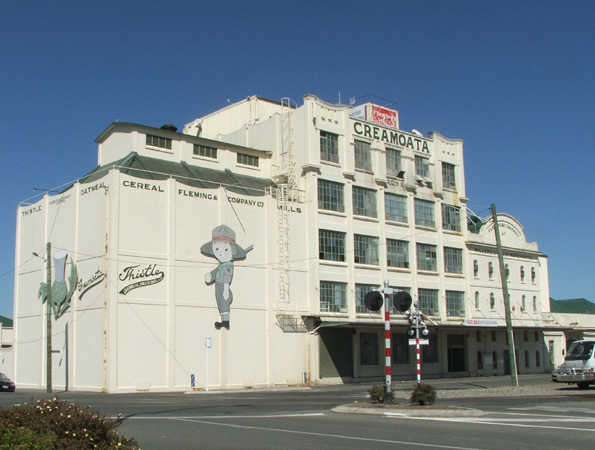
Fleming's Rolled Oats factory, a major landmark in central Gore

The Flemings "Creamoata Mill" is an iconic local building, with Flemings "Creamoata" brand of porridge once promoted by Flemings as the National Breakfast, and the mill itself considered one of the most modern cereal mills in the southern hemisphere. Production of all products was moved to Australia in 2001, and Creamoata was discontinued in 2008 after declining sales. Goodman Fielder claimed that the plant was no longer viable as it was operating at less than one third of its capacity. The building's famous "Sergeant Dan" remains because rights to it have been purchased by the buildings current owner "Sgt Dan Stockfoods Ltd". The building has a Category I listing with Heritage New Zealand.

The former East Gore Presbyterian Church of Aotearoa New Zealand is one of the two remaining wooden Gothic churches designed by the eminent architect R.A. Lawson. Built in 1880 and registered as a category 2 historic place by Heritage New Zealand, No longer used as a place of worship the building is currently being converted into an art centre, with a studio and flat for visiting artists. The latter houses the bedroom furniture from the Royal Suite commissioned for the Queen's Royal Tour to Southland in 1954.

The Hokonui Moonshine Museum in the heritage precinct celebrates Gore's part in the "... colourful history of illicit whiskey making and consumption...", with illicit whiskey being produced in the Hokonui Hills to the west of the town up until the 1930s.

The St James Theatre on Irk Street is a theatre and cinema, with a main auditorium seating 450 people and a smaller room for 78. It announced in June 2021 that it was in danger of closing if it could not raise money for earthquake strengthening and other renovations.

== Notable residents ==
- Ronald Bannerman, a flying ace during World War I. Bannerman Park in north Gore is named after him.
- Jimmy Cowan, international rugby player
- James Hargest, politician and military leader
- Amanda Hooper (nee Christie) (1980-2010), International Women's Hockey
- Luke Hurley, musician
- Roy Kerr, mathematical physicist
- Justin Marshall, international rugby player
- Shona McFarlane, artist and broadcaster
- Hugh McIntyre (1888–1982), chairman of the Alliance Freezing Company (Southland)
- Brian McKechnie (born 1953), international cricket and rugby player
- Chris McLennan, travel photographer
- Mike Puru, radio host
- Geoff Rabone, international cricketer
- Eric Roy, politician
- Jenny Shipley, former Prime Minister of New Zealand
- Barry Soper, political journalist
- Stu Wilson, international rugby player
- Ethan de Groot, international rugby player

== See also ==
- Gore Aerodrome
