= Lumsden, New Zealand =

Town in the South Island of New Zealand

Lumsden Ōreti (Māori)
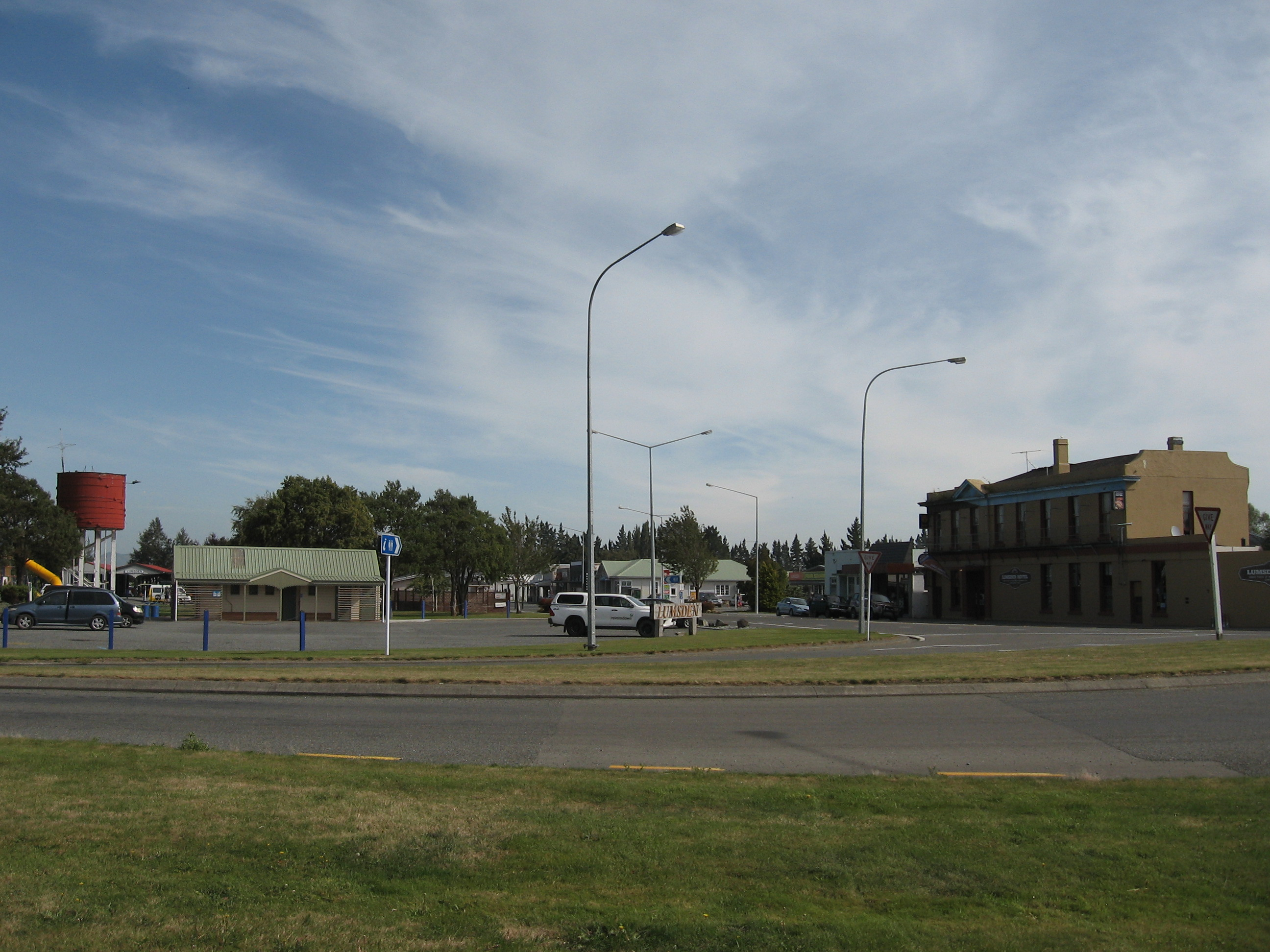
- Lumsden's town centre - February 2020
- Interactive map of Lumsden
- Coordinates: 45°44′S 168°27′E
- Country: New Zealand
- Island: South Island
- Region: Southland region
- Territorial authorities of New Zealand: Southland District
- Ward: Mararoa Waimea Ward
- Community: Northern Community
- Electorates: Southland; Te Tai Tonga (Māori)

Government
  - Territorial authority: Southland District Council
  - Regional council: Southland Regional Council
  - Mayor of Southland: Rob Scott
  - Southland MP: Joseph Mooney
  - Te Tai Tonga MP: Tākuta Ferris

Area
  - Total: 4.52 km^{2} (1.75 sq mi)

Population (June 2025)
  - Total: 530
  - Density: 120/km^{2} (300/sq mi)
- Time zone: UTC+12 (NZST)
  - Summer (DST): UTC+13 (NZDT)
- Postcode(s): 9793
- Area code: 03
- Local iwi: Ngāi Tahu

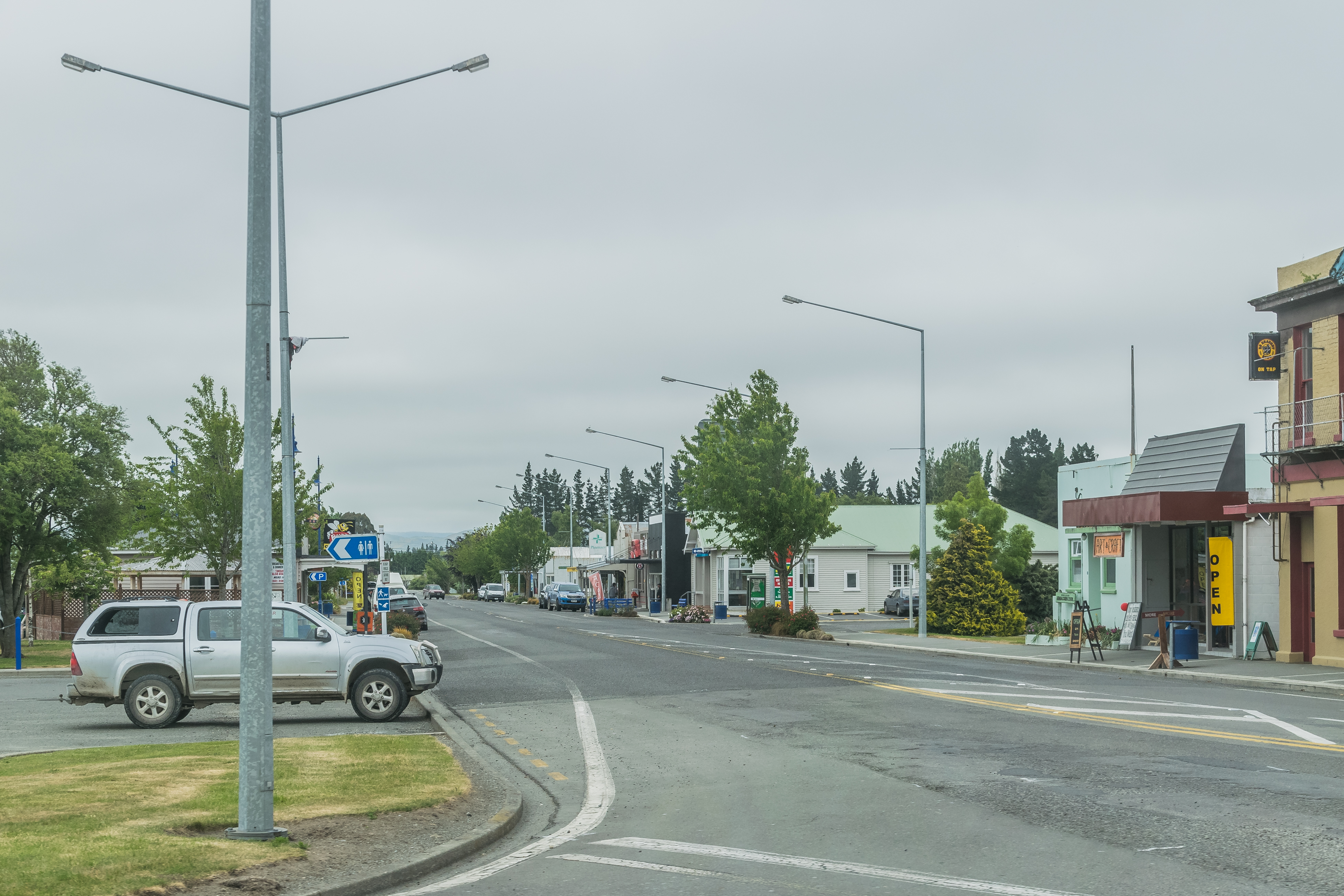
Diana Street

Lumsden (Māori: Ōreti) is a town in Southland, New Zealand. Lying in a gap in the surrounding hills, Lumsden is the location of a major junction on State Highway 6. Lumsden is 81 kilometres north of Invercargill, 106 kilometres south of Queenstown, 59 kilometres west of Gore and 77 kilometres east of Te Anau. The Ōreti River is located 1.5 kilometres east of the town.

== History ==
Originally the district in general was known as The Elbow. When this name was given to the then new railway station, residents of Castlerock, then also known as The Elbow and on the opposite bank of the Ōreti River, brought the matter to George Lumsden of the Otago Provincial Council. He referred that matter to the Railways Department who, in the absence of any other suggestion, chose the name Lumsden for the town.

In 2017, it was suggested that Lumsden is becoming a satellite town for Queenstown, despite the 100 km (62 mi) commuting distance. It was much cheaper to buy or rent a house in Lumsden and work in Queenstown where wages are potentially higher.

The Lumsden Presbyterian church, which was built in 1891, was decommissioned in 2022. It was purchased and moved to Rangiora with plans to convert it into a house. The historic church and surrounding trees were observed to remain on site in mid August 2023.

== Railways ==
Lumsden also used to be a major railway junction with lines departing to all four points of the compass. The Kingston Branch from Invercargill ran north–south through the town, while to the west was the Mossburn Branch and to the east was the Waimea Plains Railway that connected with the Main South Line in Gore. In 1971, most of the Waimea Plains Railway closed, but sixteen kilometres from Lumsden to Balfour remained open until 1978. In 1979, the line north to Kingston was closed after repairs to flood damage would not have been economic, and both the Mossburn Branch and the connection south to Invercargill closed in December 1982.

The railway station is now preserved as a tourist information centre. The Lumsden Heritage Trust, formed in 2013 has recovered and restored original carriages and trains. It has displayed the chassis of New Zealand Railways steam locomotive P 60 at the town's southern entrance, as well as two unrestored locomotives, V 126 and V 127, two Drewry diesel shunters and three wagons by the old station, to commemorate its former prominent status in New Zealand's national rail network. In April 2022 a historic 1883 A Class 199 elevated roof passenger carriage was added to the Lumsden Railway precinct.

== Demographics ==
Lumsden is described as a rural settlement by Statistics New Zealand. It covers 4.52 km^{2} (1.75 sq mi), and had an estimated population of 530 as of June 2025, with a population density of 117 people per km^{2}. It is part of the much larger Lumsden-Balfour statistical area.

Historical population for Lumsden
Year	Pop.	±% p.a.
2006	426	—
2013	420	−0.20%
2018	492	+3.22%

Before the 2023 census, Lumsden had a smaller boundary, covering 3.63 km^{2} (1.40 sq mi). Using that boundary, Lumsden had a population of 492 at the 2018 New Zealand census, an increase of 72 people (17.1%) since the 2013 census, and an increase of 66 people (15.5%) since the 2006 census. There were 228 households, comprising 258 males and 237 females, giving a sex ratio of 1.09 males per female, with 99 people (20.1%) aged under 15 years, 99 (20.1%) aged 15 to 29, 213 (43.3%) aged 30 to 64, and 81 (16.5%) aged 65 or older.

Ethnicities were 87.2% European/Pākehā, 12.2% Māori, 1.2% Pasifika, 6.7% Asian, and 1.8% other ethnicities. People may identify with more than one ethnicity.

Although some people chose not to answer the census's question about religious affiliation, 55.5% had no religion, 31.1% were Christian, 1.2% were Hindu, 0.6% were Muslim, and 0.6% were Buddhist.

Of those at least 15 years old, 48 (12.2%) people had a bachelor's or higher degree, and 120 (30.5%) people had no formal qualifications. 39 people (9.9%) earned over $70,000 compared to 17.2% nationally. The employment status of those at least 15 was that 189 (48.1%) people were employed full-time, 63 (16.0%) were part-time, and 15 (3.8%) were unemployed.

=== Lumsden-Balfour ===
The Lumsden-Balfour statistical area covers 767.62 km^{2} (296.38 sq mi) and had an estimated population of 1,370 as of June 2025, with a population density of 1.8 people per km^{2}.

Historical population for Lumsden-Balfour
Year	Pop.	±% p.a.
2006	1,212	—
2013	1,266	+0.62%
2018	1,320	+0.84%

Lumsden-Balfour had a population of 1,320 at the 2018 New Zealand census, an increase of 54 people (4.3%) since the 2013 census, and an increase of 108 people (8.9%) since the 2006 census. There were 531 households, comprising 711 males and 609 females, giving a sex ratio of 1.17 males per female. The median age was 36.9 years (compared with 37.4 years nationally), with 300 people (22.7%) aged under 15 years, 231 (17.5%) aged 15 to 29, 597 (45.2%) aged 30 to 64, and 195 (14.8%) aged 65 or older.

Ethnicities were 88.6% European/Pākehā, 8.4% Māori, 0.7% Pasifika, 6.1% Asian, and 2.0% other ethnicities. People may identify with more than one ethnicity.

The percentage of people born overseas was 13.0, compared with 27.1% nationally.

Although some people chose not to answer the census's question about religious affiliation, 50.9% had no religion, 39.5% were Christian, 0.2% had Māori religious beliefs, 0.7% were Hindu, 0.2% were Muslim, 0.5% were Buddhist and 0.9% had other religions.

Of those at least 15 years old, 159 (15.6%) people had a bachelor's or higher degree, and 237 (23.2%) people had no formal qualifications. The median income was $36,500, compared with $31,800 nationally. 138 people (13.5%) earned over $70,000 compared to 17.2% nationally. The employment status of those at least 15 was that 579 (56.8%) people were employed full-time, 177 (17.4%) were part-time, and 21 (2.1%) were unemployed.

== Education ==
Lumsden School is a contributing primary school for years 1 to 6 with a roll of 88 students as of July 2026.

Northern Southland College is a secondary school for years 7 to 13 with a roll of 213 students.

Both schools were established in 1976, replacing Lumsden District High School which ran from 1962 to 1975, and the original Lumsden School which ran from 1879 to 1962.

== Notable people ==
=== Born in Lumsden ===
- Cathy Baker (16 October 1957), New Zealand field-hockey player
- Bill English (30 December 1961), New Zealand Prime Minister (2016–2017)
- Daryl Gibson (2 March 1975), New Zealand rugby-union player and coach
- Jacob Duffy (2 August 1994), New Zealand cricketer
- Amy Rule (15 July 2000), New Zealand rugby-union player

=== Residents ===
- Lou Vincent New Zealand cricketer

== Climate ==
Climate data for Lumsden (1991–2020 normals, extremes 1984–present)
Month	Jan	Feb	Mar	Apr	May	Jun	Jul	Aug	Sep	Oct	Nov	Dec	Year
Record high °C (°F)	32.3 (90.1)	31.2 (88.2)	29.7 (85.5)	26.3 (79.3)	22.0 (71.6)	18.8 (65.8)	18.3 (64.9)	18.8 (65.8)	23.6 (74.5)	24.6 (76.3)	27.5 (81.5)	29.7 (85.5)	32.3 (90.1)
Mean maximum °C (°F)	28.1 (82.6)	27.7 (81.9)	25.8 (78.4)	22.1 (71.8)	18.9 (66.0)	15.8 (60.4)	14.9 (58.8)	16.2 (61.2)	19.3 (66.7)	22.2 (72.0)	24.2 (75.6)	26.7 (80.1)	29.3 (84.7)
Mean daily maximum °C (°F)	20.8 (69.4)	20.4 (68.7)	18.4 (65.1)	15.3 (59.5)	12.3 (54.1)	9.3 (48.7)	8.8 (47.8)	10.6 (51.1)	13.3 (55.9)	15.2 (59.4)	16.8 (62.2)	19.2 (66.6)	15.0 (59.0)
Daily mean °C (°F)	14.8 (58.6)	14.4 (57.9)	12.6 (54.7)	10.0 (50.0)	7.5 (45.5)	4.8 (40.6)	4.1 (39.4)	5.8 (42.4)	8.1 (46.6)	9.8 (49.6)	11.4 (52.5)	13.4 (56.1)	9.7 (49.5)
Mean daily minimum °C (°F)	8.9 (48.0)	8.5 (47.3)	6.8 (44.2)	4.6 (40.3)	2.8 (37.0)	0.3 (32.5)	−0.6 (30.9)	0.9 (33.6)	2.9 (37.2)	4.5 (40.1)	5.9 (42.6)	7.7 (45.9)	4.4 (40.0)
Mean minimum °C (°F)	1.9 (35.4)	1.7 (35.1)	0.3 (32.5)	−1.8 (28.8)	−3.6 (25.5)	−5.2 (22.6)	−6.3 (20.7)	−4.8 (23.4)	−3.0 (26.6)	−2.1 (28.2)	−0.7 (30.7)	0.8 (33.4)	−6.6 (20.1)
Record low °C (°F)	−0.4 (31.3)	−0.6 (30.9)	−2.9 (26.8)	−5.0 (23.0)	−7.0 (19.4)	−7.4 (18.7)	−9.0 (15.8)	−7.2 (19.0)	−6.0 (21.2)	−4.3 (24.3)	−3.6 (25.5)	−3.5 (25.7)	−9.0 (15.8)
Average rainfall mm (inches)	86.8 (3.42)	79.9 (3.15)	74.3 (2.93)	72.5 (2.85)	82.9 (3.26)	70.4 (2.77)	54.0 (2.13)	55.9 (2.20)	65.0 (2.56)	86.4 (3.40)	71.6 (2.82)	93.8 (3.69)	893.5 (35.18)
Source: NIWA
