= I've Been Everywhere =

1959 song written by Geoff Mack

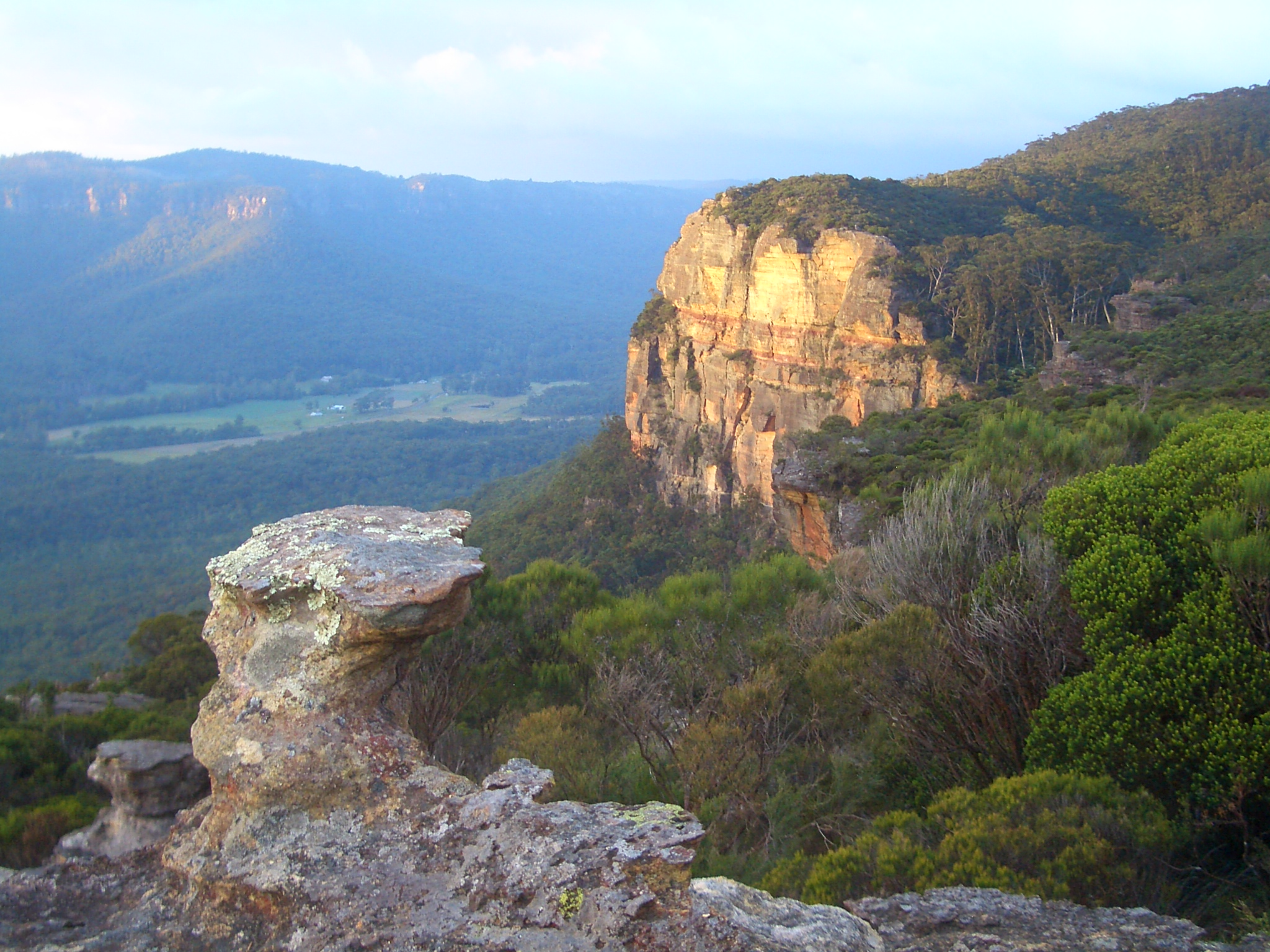
Megalong Valley

"I've Been Everywhere" is a novelty song written by Australian country singer Geoff Mack in 1959, and popularised by Lucky Starr. A version of the song with different lyrics was popularised by Hank Snow in 1962.

The song's lyrics as originally written comprise mainly the place names (toponyms) of various Australian towns visited by the singer. It was later adapted by Australian singer Rolf Harris with British place names (1963), and by John Hore (later known as John Grenell) with New Zealand place names (1966). In 1962, the song was a number-one US country hit for Hank Snow, and number 68 on the Hot 100. The song was also recorded by Lynn Anderson (US 1970), Asleep at the Wheel (US 1973), Stompin’ Tom Connors (Canada 1971), Johnny Cash (US 1996), Ted Egan, the "Farrelly Brothers" from the television series The Aunty Jack Show (Australia 1974, a parody version, on the album Aunty Jack Sings Wollongong), John Grenell (NZ 1966), Mike Ford (Canada, 2005), The Sunny Cowgirls and the Statler Brothers. Harvey Reid also included the song in his Dreamer or Believer album. In 2021, supergroup L.A. Rats, which consists of Rob Zombie, Nikki Sixx, John 5, and Tommy Clufetos, covered the song for the Netflix film The Ice Road.

Original singer Lucky Starr released an EP called Lucky's Been Everywhere, which contained four different versions, relating to the United Kingdom, United States, New Zealand, and Australia.

== Australian version ==
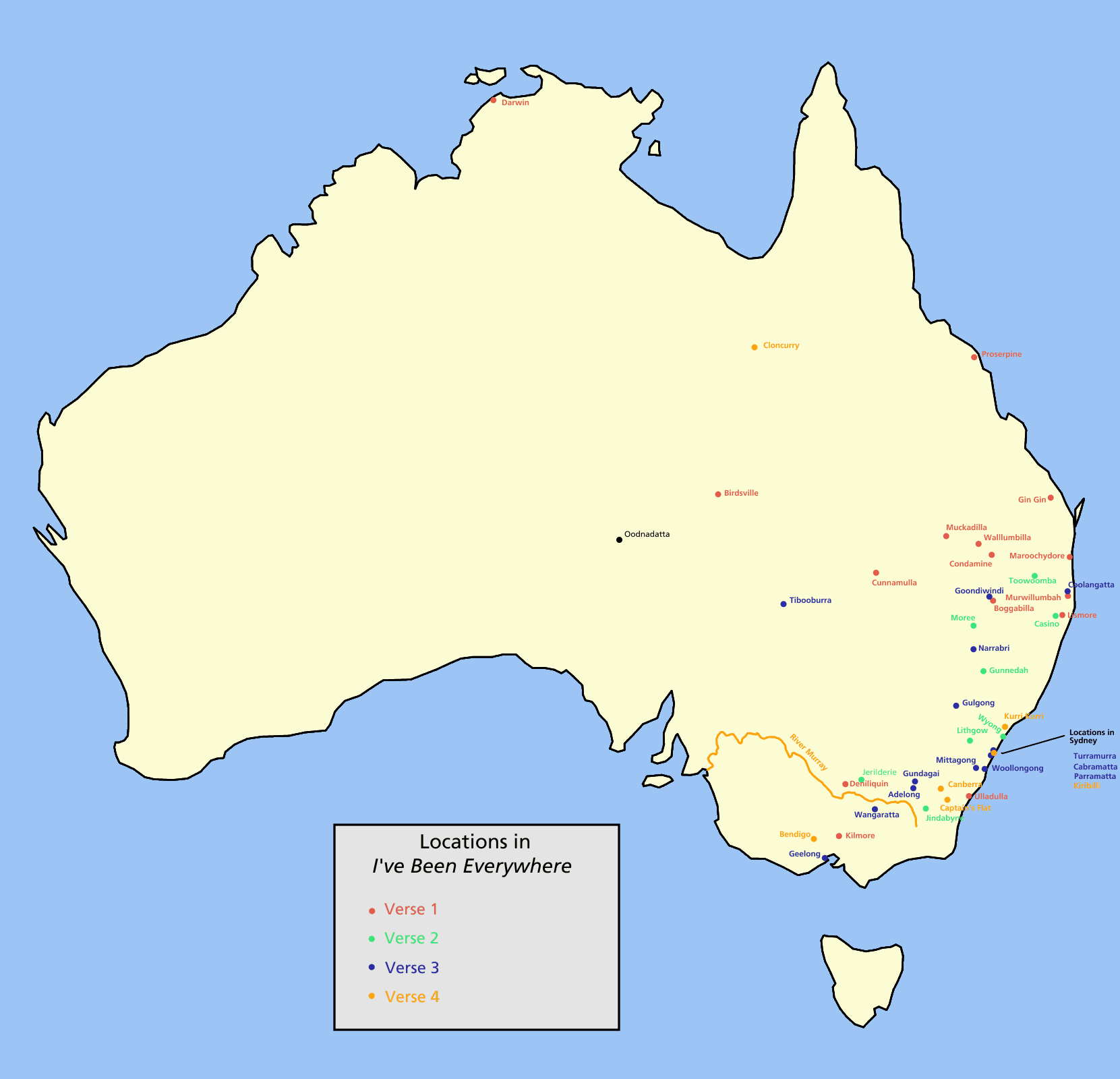
Some of the locations in the Australian version

The Australian version starts: "Well, I was humpin' my bluey (Note: 'humpin' my bluey' here means carrying my swag (bedroll)) on the dusty Oodnadatta road, When along came a semi with a high and canvas-covered load, 'If you're goin' to Oodnadatta, mate, um, with me you can ride,' so I climbed in the cabin, and I settled down inside, He asked me if I'd seen a road with so much dust and sand, I said, 'Listen, mate, I've travelled every road in this here land.' Cause..." The towns listed are:

Verse 1
Tullamore, Seymour, Lismore, Mooloolaba, Nambour, Maroochydore, Kilmore, Murwillumbah, Birdsville, Emmaville, Wallaville, Cunnamulla, Condamine, Strathpine, Proserpine, Ulladulla, Darwin, Gin Gin, Deniliquin, Muckadilla, Wallumbilla, Boggabilla, Kumbarilla.
Verse 2
Moree, Taree, Jerilderie, Bambaroo, Toowoomba, Gunnedah, Caringbah, Woolloomooloo, Dalveen, Tamborine, Engadine, Jindabyne, Lithgow, Casino, Brigalow, Narromine, Megalong, Wyong, Tuggerawong, Wanganella, Morella, Augathella, Brindabella
Verse 3
Wollongong, Geelong, Kurrajong, Mullumbimby, Mittagong, Molong, Grong Grong, Goondiwindi, Yarra Yarra, Boroondara, Wallangarra, Turramurra, Boggabri, Gundagai, Narrabri, Tibooburra, Gulgong, Adelong, Billabong, Cabramatta, Parramatta, Wangaratta, Coolangatta
Verse 4
Ettalong, Dandenong, Woodenbong, Ballarat, Canberra, Milperra, Unanderra, Captains Flat, Cloncurry, River Murray, Kurri Kurri, Girraween, Terrigal, Fingal, Stockinbingal, Collaroy, Narrabeen, Bendigo, Dorrigo, Bangalow, Indooroopilly, Kirribilli, Yeerongpilly, Wollondilly

For some of the above, more than one place in Australia has the same name (e.g., Coolangatta, Gin Gin, and Fingal). The links given above are the most famous locations with those names.

== Western Australian version ==
In 2005, Athol Wightman wrote the Western Australian version, keeping Geoff Mack's original tune but using places throughout the state of Western Australia. It was produced at the EMI Belinda Music Australia Pty Ltd studios.

Wightman included towns such as Gingin, which was also included in the Australian version, Kellerberrin, Meekatharra, Collie and Busselton.

Comedian Kevin Bloody Wilson did a parody of the song which limited his destinations to Meekatharra, hospital and jail.

== North American version ==
"I've Been Everywhere"

Single by Hank Snow

from the album I've Been Everywhere
- B-side: "Ancient History"
- Released: September 1962
- Recorded: 27 June 1962
- Genre: Country
- Length: 2:45
- Label: RCA Victor 47-8072
- Songwriter: Geoff Mack
- Producer: Chet Atkins

Hank Snow singles chronology
"You Take The Future (And I'll Take The Past)" (1962)	"I've Been Everywhere" (1962)	"The Man Who Robbed The Bank Of Santa Fe" (1963)

Geoff Mack's music publisher offered the song to Canadian-born country musician Hank Snow in 1962. Snow thought the song had the potential for the Canadian and American markets, but only if the toponyms were adapted to North America. At his publisher's urging, Geoff Mack consequently rewrote the song using a North American atlas supplied to him by the publisher. In 1970, from the album Cure for the Blues, Snow also recorded a second song to this called "I Ain't Been Anywhere". The North American version starts: "I was totin' my pack along the dusty Winnemucca road". Below are the places mentioned in this version of the song, most of which are in the continent of North America, while six are in South America: Salvador, Barranquilla, Tocopilla, Argentina, Padilla, and Diamantina:

First verse
Reno, Chicago, Fargo, Minnesota, Buffalo, Toronto, Winslow, Sarasota, Wichita, Tulsa, Ottawa, Oklahoma, Tampa, Panama, Mattawa, (Note: This could be either Mattawa, Ontario or Mattawa, Washington.) La Paloma, (Note: Could also be a reference to La Paloma, Rocha, Uruguay.) Bangor, Baltimore, Salvador, Amarillo, Tocopilla, Barranquilla and Padilla.
Second verse
Boston, Charleston, Dayton, Louisiana, Washington, Houston, Kingston, Texarkana, Monterey, Ferriday, Santa Fe, Tallapoosa, Glen Rock, Black Rock, Little Rock, Oskaloosa, Tennessee, Hennessey, Chicopee, Spirit Lake, Grand Lake, Devil's Lake and Crater Lake.
Third verse
Louisville, Nashville, Knoxville, Ombabika, Schefferville, Jacksonville, Waterville, Costa Rica, Pittsfield, Springfield, Bakersfield, Shreveport, Hackensack, Cadillac, Fond du Lac, Davenport, Idaho, Jellico, (Note: Could also be a reference to Jellicoe, Ontario.) Argentina, Diamantina, Pasadena and Catalina.
Fourth verse
Pittsburgh, Parkersburg, Gravelbourg, Colorado, Ellensburg, Rexburg, Vicksburg, Eldorado, Larimore, Atmore, Haverstraw, Chatanika, Chaska, Nebraska, Alaska, Opelika, Baraboo, Waterloo, Kalamazoo, Kansas City, Sioux City, Cedar City and Dodge City.

A map of all locations named in the North American version

== New Zealand version ==
The New Zealand version, recorded in 1966 by John Grenell, starts: Well I was hitching a ride on a winding Hokitika road, when along came a lorry....

First verse
Kaharoa, Whangaroa, Akaroa, Motueka, Taramoa, Benmore, Pongaroa, Horoeka, Riwaka, Rimutaka, Te Karaka, Whangārei, Nūhaka, Waimahaka, Motuhora, Waikaka, Motunui, Hokonui, Papanui, Wainui, Mātāwai, Rongotai, Pikowai
Second verse
Woodville, Dargaville, Lumsden, Katikati, Naseby, Cambridge, Porirua, Mangaroa, Hastings, Tikitiki, Tauranga, Auckland, Naenae, Waitaha, Hamilton, Poroporo, Taupō, Timaru, Oamaru, Tihoi, Awanui, Whanganui, Pauanui
Third verse
Featherston, Palmerston, Woolston, Te Awamutu, Riverton, Queenstown, Picton, Ohinemutu, Mōrere, Kōrere, Rotorua, Kaikōura, Matamata, Ruakura, Ikamatua, Papakura, Waitaki, Pukaki, Taranaki, Te Kauwhata, Ropata, Ikowai, Waitematā
Fourth verse
Ruatoki, Mataura, Taupiri, Maketu, Kyeburn, Sowburn, Wedderburn, Mossburn, Washdyke, Arawhata, Paparoa, Kaponga, Te Aroha, Thames, Kerikeri, Kokonga, Tapanui, Porinui, Tawanui, Ōtāhuhu, Ruatapu, Mosgiel, Whareroa
Fifth verse
Kāpiti, Ngawaka, Onepu, Reporoa, Tongariro, Tomoana, Renwick, Papamoa, Karitane, Oxford, Parihaka, Karetu, Coalgate, Whitecliffs, Urenui, Mamaku, Waimea, Waharoa, Dannevirke, Ngahere, Gordonton, Kingston, Oban

== Great Britain and Ireland version ==
Lucky Starr's Great Britain and Ireland version starts: "I was peddlin' me bike on a narrow road near Brightlingsea, When along came a lorry and pulled up alongside o' me, 'Ere chuck your bike up on the back cop and with me you can ride, So I climbed up in the cabin and I settled down inside, He told me of the towns he'd seen and bashed me ear for several miles, I said 'ere, mug it cop, I've been to every town in these 'ere isles."

First verse
Bradford, Guildford, Oxford, Littlehampton, Bedford, Chingford, Hereford, Wolverhampton, Shrewsbury, Canterbury, Aylesbury, Liverpool, Scunthorpe, Sandthorpe, Mablethorpe, Hartlepool, Whitehall, Blackpool, Mildenhall, Davenport, Newport, Southport, Stockport
Second verse
Farnborough, Edinburgh, Peterborough, Felixstowe, Middlesbrough, Loughborough, Scarborough, Walthamstow, Blackburn, Lisburn, Bannockburn, Derry, Wicklow, Glasgow, Hounslow, Tipperary, Hempstead, Wanstead, Banstead, Woodstock, Bass Rock, Bell Rock, Tilbury Dock
Third verse
Weymouth, Yarmouth, Bournemouth, Huddersfield, Lewisham, Faversham, Petersham, Chesterfield, Southend, Mile End, Land's End, Birkenhead, Birmingham, Nottingham, Gillingham, Holyhead, Cambridge, Tonbridge, Knightsbridge, Broadstairs, Edgware, Ross Wear, Carstairs
Fourth verse
Westminster, Southminster, Kidderminster, Accrington, Eastbourne, Southbourne, Sittingbourne, Paddington, Bolton, Paignton, Stockton, Inverness, Renwick, Brunswick, Chiswick, Dungeness, Mansfield, Sheffield, Enfield, King's Cross, New Cross, Charing Cross, Banbury Cross

Covers of this version were also recorded by the British group The Mudlarks and by Australian singer Rolf Harris, who added a few tongue-twisting Welsh placenames but (humorously) referred to them as Scottish, found them so hard to pronounce he said, "Better get back to the English version," and concluded with the final verse above.

== Texas version ==
Texas country singer Brian Burns released his version of the song in 2002, featuring numerous locations throughout Texas. This version was also featured in the movie Grand Champion. The Texas version starts: "I was totin' my pack along the dusty Amarillo road when along came a semi with a high and canvas-covered load."

First verse
Waco, Hico, Hondo, Navasota, Winnsboro, Jacksboro, Hillsboro, Santa Rosa, Austin, Houston, Galveston, Texarkana, Frisco, Buffalo, Conroe, Corsicana, Goliad, Groesbeck, Glen Rose, Red Oak, Post Oak, Live Oak, Lone Oak
Second verse
Krugerville, Pflugerville, Van Horn, Val Verde, Brackettville, Bartonville, Beeville, Bulverde, Bear Creek, Cedar Creek, Mill Creek, Mineola, Maypearl, Monahans, Telephone, Tuscola, Redwater, Round Rock, Round Top, Round Lake, Sour Lake, Southlake, Springlake
Third verse
Greenville, Gatesville, Gainesville, Alameda, Kerrville, Kellyville, Bastrop, Benavides, Somerville, Smithville, Stephenville, Prairie View, Luckenbach, Longview, Plainview, Idalou, Justin, Junction, Panorama, Pasadena, Angelina, Lorena
Fourth verse
Valley Mills, Pine Mills, Dime Box, Duncanville, New Home, New Hope, New Deal, Liberty Hill, Rockport, Rock Creek, Bridgeport, Brownwood, Cleburne, Comanche, Cut & Shoot, Cottonwood, Bayview, Bayside, Baytown, Bay City, Falls City, Center City, Bridge City

== Other notable versions ==
Aunty Jack
"I've been to Wollongong (x 22), Dapto, Wollongong." (Dapto is a suburb of Wollongong.)
Canada
Stompin' Tom Connors adds an extra spoken segment of locations in Ontario and a verse for locations in the Maritimes. He also substitutes Canadian cities, including Halifax and Montreal, at various points in the other verses. Mike Ford, formerly a member of Moxy Früvous, did an all-Canadian version for his album, Canada Needs You, in 2005. Ford's version includes the fictional town of Melonville, home of SCTV. Canadian comedian Rick Moranis has a version called "I Ain't Goin' Nowhere" where he sings about why he will not leave his easy chair. Canadian comedy duo MacLean & MacLean wrote a parody entitled "I've Seen Pubic Hair." It first appeared on their 1976 album Bitter Reality as part of the live piece "Bland Ole Opry (Slim Chance, Stretch Marks)", and then a studio version with an added verse was featured on their 1980 album Suck Their Way to the Top/Take the "O" Out of Country. The song lists various types of pubic hairs that the singer has seen, including "...great ones, straight ones, on my dinner plate ones, long ones, strong ones, little curly blonde ones, red ones, dead ones, layin' on the head ones". George Fox released his version in 1988.
Czechoslovakia (adapted by Ladislav Vodička)
"Já tu zemi znám"
Eugene Chadbourne
The US entertainer recorded a version on his 1988 album, also entitled I've Been Everywhere. He starts with Hank Snow's opening verse and then rattles off city names from all over the world (including Bogotá, Khartoum, and Nairobi), throws in a gentle poke at Neil Young and Farm Aid, and ends with Eugene declaring only one place he has not been to - Alcatraz.
Finland (adapted by Turo's Hevi Gee)
"Oon käyny kaikkialla". The singer chats with a train conductor and gives a list of Finnish places.
Germany (adapted by Jackie Leven)
"I was walking down the Ku'damm in the City of Berlin." Complete with an entire verse of Baden-Baden. Published on the 2007 album Oh What A Blow That Phantom Dealt Me!
Springfield's state (adapted by Tim Long)
The Simpsons episode "Mobile Homer" includes a version of the song listing the following various fictional towns in the series: Springfield, Shelbyville, Ogdenville, Cap City, Ogdenburg, Shelbytown, Spring City, Cap Field, West Springfield, Paris, Rome, and Shelbyville Adjacent.
Houston (adapted by Hayes Carll)
"I been to Houston, Houston, Houston, Houston...".
World (adapted By Medeski Martin and Wood)
"This jazz group made a children-oriented version titled "Let's Go Everywhere", using city names from all over the world."
MacLean & MacLean
The Canadian comedy duo released a parody version called "I've Seen Pubic Hair" on their 1976 part live / part studio album titled Bitter Reality.
Catalonia (adapted by vàlius)
The Catalan band vàlius adapted the song as an homage to writer Josep Maria Espinàs, author of several travel books through Catalonia.
0–9 Series
Lucky Starr recorded a version for the Australian children's release "0–9 Series" in 1989, appearing on the album titled "Seven". This version features the first verse of the Australian version, followed by the first verse of the North American version, followed by the first verse of the Great Britain version and finishing with the third verse of the Australian version.
Lockdown 2020
Chuck Mead recorded a version as '"The Official Song of Quarantine" during the COVID-19 pandemic in May 2020, titled "I Ain't Been Nowhere".
Thailand
In 2023, The Queensland Tiger did an English version with over 100 place names in Thai, covering five different regions of Thailand. It was published on YouTube.

== Other uses ==
Kris Kristofferson did an abbreviated version in the 1973 film Pat Garrett and Billy the Kid during his escape scene. In 1996, country singer Johnny Cash recorded and released his version on his second American Recordings album, Unchained. Cash's version of "I've Been Everywhere" was featured in Citgo commercials in 1999, featuring the tagline "You know me". The song was also featured in season 2 of The Grim Adventures of Billy & Mandy and in Choice Hotels commercials from 2003 to 2009. In 2004, the Chicago Transit Authority used a version of the song, listing neighbourhoods and stops along the transit lines in two 30-second spots. In 2010, The Sports Network used a version of the song, listing cities and regions in the National Hockey League, to promote its coverage of trade deadline day.

In October 2003, the publisher Rightsong Music BMI granted permission to Frank Loconto to write new lyrics and title for the 2004 presidential campaign of Bob Graham. Titled "I've Done Every Job, Man", it commemorated the more than 300 'workdays' performed by Graham during his 30 plus years of public service to the people of Florida. The song, recorded by Loconto for FXL Records, was included on a promotional CD, Bob Graham Charisma Album 2004.

Comic actor Rick Moranis wrote and recorded a parody version of the song, titled "I Ain't Goin' Nowhere" on his 2005 album, The Agoraphobic Cowboy.

Australian Peter Harris visited all the locations in the Australian version of "I've Been Everywhere" between December 2009 and July 2011. A record of his trip is online.

Nebraska native Brett Anderson rode his motorcycle, Annie, to all the locations in the North American version of "I've Been Everywhere" between 6 June 2017 and 31 October 2019. During this time, he visited all 92 song places, including 16 countries and 49 states. The record of his 73,000 mile trip can be found online.

In 2010, the Swedish band Movits! used the track for one of the episodes of their US tour movie, First We Take Manhattan.

Bruce Springsteen used the song as a snippet for "Light of Day" during his 1999–2000 Reunion tour.

John Finnemore did a version listing places in Dorset for an episode of I'm Sorry I Haven't A Clue recorded in Poole.

Johnny Cash's 1996 version was used in the Family Guy episode "The Most Interesting Man in the World", the seventeenth episode of the twelfth season, episode 227 overall, which originally aired on 13 April 2014.

Rihanna interpolated the main verse from the song to her 2011 song "Where Have You Been".

In early 2022, the United States Postal Service began using the Johnny Cash (US) version in advertisements.

== See also ==
- Ramblin' Man (Lemon Jelly song)
