= Center City, Texas =

- Unincorporated community
- Location within Texas Location within the United States
- Coordinates: 31°28′14″N 98°24′32″W
- Country: United States
- State: Texas
- County: Mills
- Elevation: 1,408 ft (429 m)
- Time zone: UTC-6 (Central (CST))
  - Summer (DST): UTC-5 (CDT)
- Area code: 325
- GNIS feature ID: 1354189

Center City is an unincorporated community in Mills County, located in the U.S. state of Texas. According to the Handbook of Texas, the community had a population of 15 in 2003.

== History ==
William Jenkins, David Morris, and their families settled here in 1864. It was originally named Hughes Store when W.C. Hughes and his wife built a store here in the 1870s. There is also a cemetery in the community.

The Geoff Mack song I've Been Everywhere has a Texas version that mentions Center City in its fourth verse.

== Geography ==
Center City is located on U.S. Highway 84 north of Bennett Creek, 8 mi (13 km) east of Goldthwaite in eastern Mills County.

== Education ==
Center City had its own school in 1874 with classes also being held under the old oak tree. Today, the community is served by the Star Independent School District.

== Notable person ==
- Harvey Miles, final mayor of Renner, was born in Center City.
