= Southorn =

Southorn is a surname, and may refer to:

- Bella Sidney Southorn or Bella Sidney Woolf OBE (1877–1960), English author, sister of author Leonard Woolf and wife of Tom Southorn
- Fiona Southorn (born 1967), New Zealand paralympic cyclist
- Jordon Southorn (born 1990), Canadian professional ice hockey defenceman
- Thomas Southorn (1879–1957), British colonial administrator, spending the large part of his career in Ceylon (now Sri Lanka)
- Willie Southorn, New Zealand rugby league player who represented his country

== See also ==
- Southorn Playground (Chinese: 修頓遊樂場, 修頓球場), a sports and recreational facility in the Wan Chai area of Hong Kong
- Southorn (constituency), one of the 13 constituencies in the Wan Chai District
- Southbourne (disambiguation)
