= Val Verde, Texas =

- Unincorporated community
- Location within Texas Location within the United States
- Coordinates: 30°50′4″N 97°14′52″W
- Country: United States
- State: Texas
- County: Milam
- Elevation: 427 ft (130 m)

Population (2000)
  - Total: 25
- Time zone: UTC-6 (Central (CST))
  - Summer (DST): UTC-5 (CDT)
- Area codes: 512 & 737
- GNIS feature ID: 1380702

Val Verde is an unincorporated community in Milam County, Texas, United States. According to the Handbook of Texas, the community had a population of 25 in 2000.

== History ==
It was founded in 1868 and given the name Valverde after the Civil War fight that two Milam County companies fought in New Mexico. James Pittman Whittington gave the community land for a church and a cemetery. 25 people lived in Val Verde in 2000.

The community was featured in the Geoff Mack song I've Been Everywhere.

== Geography ==
Val Verde is located on Farm to Market Road 437, 16 mi (26 km) west of Cameron in western Milam County.

== Education ==
In 1903, Val Verde had a school with one teacher and 26 students. In 1941, the Val Verde school district joined the Sharp district; however, in 1961, it separated from Sharp and split its territory between the Bell County districts of Holland and Rogers.
