= Grenell =

Grenell is a surname. Notable people with the surname include:

- John Grenell, a.k.a. John Denver Hore (born 1944), New Zealand country singer and songwriter
- Richard Grenell (born 1966), American diplomat, intelligence official, and media consultant
