= Cottonwood, Callahan County, Texas =

- Unincorporated community
- Location within the state of Texas Cottonwood (the United States)
- Coordinates: 32°12′21″N 99°12′16″W
- Country: United States
- State: Texas
- County: Callahan
- Elevation: 1,181 ft (360 m)

Population (1990)
  - Total: 65
- Time zone: UTC-6 (Central (CST))
  - Summer (DST): UTC-5 (CDT)
- GNIS feature ID: 1378167

Cottonwood is an unincorporated community in southeastern Callahan County, Texas, United States. According to the Handbook of Texas, the community had a population of 65 in 2000.

Cottonwood is part of the Abilene, Texas metropolitan statistical area.

== History ==
Cottonwood, so named because of the cottonwood trees that flourish there, was first inhabited in 1875 or 1876 by J. W. Love. Farmers from East Texas were drawn to the area by its agricultural potential, and Dr. H. O. Broadnax constructed the first store. Cottonwood was the hub of trade in the area for a while after a post office was constructed in 1882. When C. J. Wilson's weekly newspaper, the Prodigal, began publication in 1890, 350 people were living there. Early on, the town was notorious for its violence, with two fatal shootouts occurring on Main Street. Jim Champion, Dan Robinson, John Breeding, Green, and Henry Robinson were among the pioneers. Bill Orr, Fred Griffin, Elias Norton, and J. F. Coffey were among the early merchants. In 1903, a cannery for fruits and vegetables began. With the introduction of the vehicle and the transition in agricultural focus from growing fruits and vegetables to grazing, Cottonwood became less prominent. Just 300 people were living there in 1915, and only 120 in 1940. Between 1980 and 2000, 65 people were living there.

In a tiny frame building, in 1911, W. F. Griffin started a bank. Paul Ramsey was the first president, and Griffin was the director. He worked as a custodian, teller, cashier, and loan officer. Residents and businessmen left Cottonwood when the railroad bypassed it. The bank closed in January 1915. Hazel Respess operated a post office in the building for 50 years, starting in 1918. Postal service was discontinued in 1975. This location is used as a community meeting place. It is maintained by the Cottonwood Historical Association. It also maintains the local Methodist Church and its two cemeteries.

The Cottonwood Quilting Club quilts in the Cottonwood Community Center every Thursday and is responsible for maintaining it. The Cottonwood Musical was held at the building on the third Friday of each month until a few years ago. Musicians, including guitarists and fiddlers, would travel great distances to perform. People would enjoy homemade pies and country music. The West Texas Rehabilitation Center benefit Rehab Night and Turkey Supper night, which are both initiatives of the Quilting Club, are still hosted at the Community Center. The annual meeting of the Cottonwood Historical Association takes place in the Community Center on the first Saturday of May.

According to interviews, two brothers surnamed Newton, who were notorious bank and train robbers, lived near Cottonwood.

The Geoff Mack song "I've Been Everywhere" mentions this community in the fourth verse of the Texas version.

== Geography ==
Cottonwood is located on Farm to Market Road 880 and Farm to Market Road 1079, 8 mi (13 km) northwest of Cross Plains, 33 mi (53 km) southwest of Eastland, and 45 mi (72 km) southeast of Abilene in southeastern Callahan County.

== Education ==
The Cottonwood Community Center was formerly the town's school. Today, the community is served by the Cross Plains Independent School District.
