= Where Have You Been =

Single by Rihanna

from the album Talk That Talk
- Released: April 17, 2012
- Recorded: 2011
- Studio: Eightysevenfourteen Studios, Eyeknowasecret Studio (Los Angeles)
- Genre: Electro house; trance; techno; EDM
- Length: 4:02
- Label: Def Jam; SRP
- Songwriters: Esther Dean; Lukasz Gottwald; Calvin Harris; Henry Walter; Geoff Mack
- Producers: Dr. Luke; Cirkut; Calvin Harris

Rihanna singles chronology
"Birthday Cake" (2012)	"Where Have You Been" (2012)	"Cockiness (Love It)" (remix) (2012)

Music video
- "Where Have You Been" on YouTube

"Where Have You Been" is a song by the Barbadian singer Rihanna from her sixth album Talk That Talk (2011). It was released as the third international single from the album on April 17, 2012. The song was written by Ester Dean, Geoff Mack, Lukasz "Dr. Luke" Gottwald, Henry "Cirkut" Walter, and Calvin Harris, with production handled by the latter three. The track is a dance-pop song that draws influence from trance, R&B and hip hop. It is backed by "hard, chilly synths" and contains an electro-inspired breakdown sequence. The song's lyrics interpolate Geoff Mack's 1959 song "I've Been Everywhere" and speak of a woman who is searching for a lover who will sexually please her.

"Where Have You Been" was met with positive reviews from most music critics, who likened the song to Talk That Talk's lead single, "We Found Love". The track performed well on major international charts. In the United States, "Where Have You Been" reached number 5 on the Billboard Hot 100, marking Rihanna's twenty-second Top 10 single on the chart. It also peaked at number 1 in Mexico, on both the US Dance Club Songs and UK Dance Chart, and at number 3 on the US Pop Songs chart. In addition, it attained top five positions in the Czech Republic, Denmark, France, Israel and New Zealand, while peaking in the top ten of charts in twenty countries worldwide including Australia, Belgium, Norway and the United Kingdom. The song is certified Platinum or higher in eight countries.

The song's accompanying music video, directed by Dave Meyers depicts the singer in an assortment of costumes and locations, referencing the song's lyrics. Rihanna is seen as a semi-naked water reptilian, in an Egyptian desert, an African themed hut, and channeling Hindu god Shiva with multiple limbs. The video received a positive response from critics, who praised Rihanna's new approach to deeper choreography. Rihanna has performed the song on both Saturday Night Live and the finale of the eleventh season of American Idol. Rihanna also performed the song at the Super Bowl LVII halftime show in a medley with Only Girl (In the World).

The song was nominated for a 2013 Grammy Award for Best Pop Solo Performance.

== Production and recording ==
"Where Have You Been" was written by Ester Dean, Geoff Mack, Lukasz "Dr. Luke" Gottwald, Calvin Harris, and Henry "Cirkut" Walter, with production, instrumentation, and programming also handled by the latter three. Mack's song "I've Been Everywhere" is interpolated throughout the song. Dean, Gottwald, Harris, and Walter have produced and/or co-written other songs on Talk That Talk: "We Found Love" for Harris, and "You da One" for Dean, Gottwald, and Walter.

"Where Have You Been" was recorded by Kuk Harrell and Marcus Tovar at Eightysevenfourteen Studios, Los Angeles, California and Eyeknowasecret Studio, Brentwood, California. Harrel and Tovar were also the vocals engineers and were assisted in the process by Jennifer Rosales. The engineers for the song in its entirety were Aubry "Big Juice" Delaine and Clint Gibbs. It was mixed by Serban Ghenea.

== Composition and lyrics ==
"Where Have You Been"
A 24-second sample of the song's chorus, which has been compared to Pitbull's "International Love", Adele's "Rolling in the Deep", and one of Rihanna's previous singles, "We Found Love".

"Where Have You Been" is a dance-pop and dance song, which blends elements of R&B, hip hop and house together. It also incorporates elements of trance music. As noted by Mark Graham for VH1, the song features a "sweeping, trance-ish transition that will bowl over dancefloor denizens in clubs all over the world." Randell Roberts for Los Angeles Times noted that "Rihanna wants her music to bang, and she does so by continuing to mine the connection between R&B, hip-hop and house." Jon Caramanica for The New York Times stated that the song is on the "poppier side of house music." The instrumentation is composed of "buzzy, burping electronics" and "hard, chilly synths." It also features a "monstrous bass", which will according to Graham "will make you want to trade in your factory-installed car speakers for a top-of-the-line sound system."

In the "unashamedly sexual" song, Rihanna sings about her desire and wish to find a man who is able to satisfy and please her in any way possible, singing "Where have you been all my li-i-i-i-i-fe" (sic). According to Robert Copsey for Digital Spy, it is when Rihanna performs this line that the instrumental changes into a "strobing trance section that ends in a synth-squelching breakdown." Andy Kellam for AllMusic likened the song's chorus to that of Adele "Rolling in the Deep". Caramanica likened the tone of Rihanna's vocals to that of English singer Siouxsie Sioux as she performs the lines "I been everywhere, man/ looking for someone/ someone who can please me,/ Are you hiding from me yeah/ somewhere in the crowd?" "Where Have You Been" lasts for a duration of 4 minutes and 3 seconds, and it was composed in the key of C minor using common time and a moderate dance groove of 128 beats per minute; it follows a chord progression Cm–A♭–Cm–A♭ with a time signature of 4/4. Rihanna's vocal range spans over one octave from the low note of B♭_{3} to the high note of C_{5} on the song.

== Critical reception ==
"Where Have You Been" garnered positive reviews from music critics. Andy Kellman for Allmusic wrote that "Where Have You Been", along with the album's lead single "We Found Love", serve as Talk That Talk's "place-holding" dance tracks. Greg Kot for the Chicago Tribune compared "Where Have You Been" and "We Found Love" for being "rave-tastic." Aside from noting the similarities between the two songs, Randell Roberts for Los Angeles Times wrote that neither song would sound out of place at an Electric Daisy Carnival. Julianne Escobedo Shepherd for Spin also wrote that the song was a perfect play for a festival, writing "'Where Have You Been' is tailor-made for a Coachella pool rave." Jon Caramanica for The New York Times was complimentary of both songs, but wrote that "Where Have You Been" "is even better." Mark Graham for VH1 compared the song to one of Rihanna's previous singles from her 2007 album Good Girl Gone Bad, "Don't Stop the Music", writing "'Where Have You Been will almost certainly be Rihanna's biggest club smash since 'Don't Stop the Music'."

Robert Copsey for Digital Spy shared the same opinion as Graham, writing "We labelled 'Where Have You Been' the record's 'Don't Stop The Music'." He continued to give an explanation as to why the songs are similar writing, "On the surface, similarities between the two are almost non-existent, but on closer inspection, not only are they the danciest cuts on their respective LPs, they're both favourites that fans have been eager to see get an official release." Copsey concluded his review praising the song and Rihanna, writing "Like Rihanna herself, it's hectic, confident and unashamedly sexual." Meghan Brownfield for the Columbia Missourian praised the song as a track which people will want to dance to as well as writing that the lyrics ensure that the listener pays attention to the lyrics, saying "It is a song you would hear in a club that everyone would want to dance to. This song makes you want to move, and it also has some strong lyrics that make you focus on what she is saying." Matthew Cole of Slant Magazine, however, was critical of the song, writing that the song is a "boring dubstep-normalizing dance number reminiscent of LMFAO," as well as Rihanna's own "We Found Love".

=== Awards ===
Year	Ceremony	Award	Result
2012	MTV Video Music Awards	Best Choreography	Nominated
2012	MTV Video Music Awards	Best Visual Effects	Nominated
2012	Soul Train Music Awards	Best Dance Performance	Won
2012	The 4Music Video Honours	Best Video	Nominated
2013	Grammy Awards	Best Pop Solo Performance	Nominated
2013	NRJ Music Awards	Video Of The Year	Nominated
2013	Billboard Music Awards	Top Dance Song	Nominated

== Chart performance ==
=== North America ===
In the United States, "Where Have You Been" debuted on the US Billboard Hot 100 on December 10, 2011, at number 65 upon the release of the album, with digital download sales of 39,000 copies sold. Upon its release as a single, the song re-entered the Hot 100 at number 78 for the issue dated May 12, 2012. On July 7, 2012, the song reached its peak of number 5, where it remained for a further week. "Where Have You Been" became Rihanna's 22nd top ten chart entry on the Hot 100. Rihanna is currently tied with Janet Jackson and Mariah Carey with 27 entries each, while Madonna leads with 38 entries, the most among all solo and group acts. Rihanna is also the only artist to have attained as many Hot 100 top ten chart entries in shortest time span, with 27 top 10 entries in the space of ten years.

On the Digital Songs chart, it debuted at number 65 on December 10, 2011. Upon its release as a single, it re-entered the chart at number 78. By June 7, 2012, the song had ascended to number 5, which remained its peak for the following week. "Where Have You Been" became Rihanna's 26th top ten song to peak within the top ten of the Digital Songs chart. With this chart entry, she surpassed Lil Wayne for achieving the most top ten chart entries, who is now second with a total of 25 entries, since the Digital Songs chart began to contribute to the Hot 100 in February 2005. On the Adult Pop Songs, "Where Have You Been" peaked at number 20. "Where Have You Been" peaked at number 1 on the Dance Club Songs chart on June 9, 2012. With "Where Have You Been" attaining the peak position of the Dance Club Songs chart, Rihanna is now tied in third place with Beyoncé for having the most number 1 songs on the chart with a total of 18. "Where Have You Been" peaked at number 12 on the Hot Latin Songs chart, and number 4 on the Latin Pop Songs chart.

"Where Have You Been" debuted at number 64 on the Radio Songs chart on May 12, 2012. On June 16, 2012, the song peaked at number 9, with a 17% increase to a total of 64 million audience impressions. With this chart entry, "Where Have You Been" became Rihanna's 19th top ten on the chart, surpassing Lil Wayne, who has 18 top tens. On the Hot R&B/Hip-Hop Songs chart, "Where Have You Been" peaked at number 56. It peaked at number 3 on the Pop Songs chart. "Where Have You Been" also peaked at number 5 on Billboard's Songs of the Summer, and number 32 on the Tropical Songs chart. On November 17, 2026, "Where Have You Been" was certified six-times platinum by the Recording Industry Association of America (RIAA), denoting shipments of over 6,000,000 copies. In Canada, "Where Have You Been" peaked at number 5.

=== Oceania and Europe ===
"Where Have You Been" made its chart debut on the Australian Singles Chart on December 4, 2011, at number 46. It re-entered the chart at number 25 four months later, following its single release confirmation. The song peaked at number 6 in its sixth week on the chart. It was certified seven-times platinum by the Australian Recording Industry Association (ARIA), denoting 490,000 equivalent units. "Where Have You Been" debuted on the New Zealand Singles Chart on April 2, 2012, at number 19. The song later peaked at number 4 for two consecutive weeks. It has been certified triple platinum by Recorded Music NZ (RMNZ), for sales of over 90,000 units.

Upon the release of Talk That Talk, "Where Have You Been" charted at numbers 8 and 61 on the UK Dance Chart and UK Singles Chart on November 28, 2011, respectively. After the release of the music video, it re-entered the singles chart at number 21, and the dance chart at three, respectively. The following week, it jumped into the top ten of the singles chart at number 8, and topped the dance charts, marking Rihanna's third number 1 on the chart, following "Who's That Chick?" with David Guetta (2010), and "We Found Love" with Calvin Harris (2011). With this, it became the singer's first number 1 as a solo lead artist, and gave her number 1 singles in three consecutive years. It sold 422,200 copies in the UK in 2012. "Where Have You Been" has also charted in other European countries including in the top ten in Belgium, Denmark, France, Greece, Hungary, Ireland, and Norway. In Italy, the highest position on the chart is 23.

== Music video ==
=== Background ===
"Because my schedule has always been so busy, it never allowed for us to spend time rehearsing and making up dance moves. 'I was never going to shoot this video if I couldn't do choreography. Because it would be pretty pointless. It would be disappointing."

— Rihanna talking about the choice to delve into choreography on the video.

The music video for "Where Have You Been" was filmed on March 7–9, 2012 in Los Angeles, California and was directed by Dave Meyers. On the first day of filming, March 7, 2012, Rihanna tweeted: "Where Have You Been All My Life?", with a picture of herself topless with her natural hair on the set of the music video. The video features choreography by Nadine "Hi-Hat" Ruffin, who has worked with Rihanna previously on her Grammy and Brit Awards performances. She posted photos of her as a teaser for the video in her Facebook account, with one saying: "How much do you guys want to see the video?". A day after she posted the photo, she released a behind-the-scenes footage of the video with the dance rehearsals for the video and afterwards the wardrobe fitting for the video shoot.

=== Synopsis ===
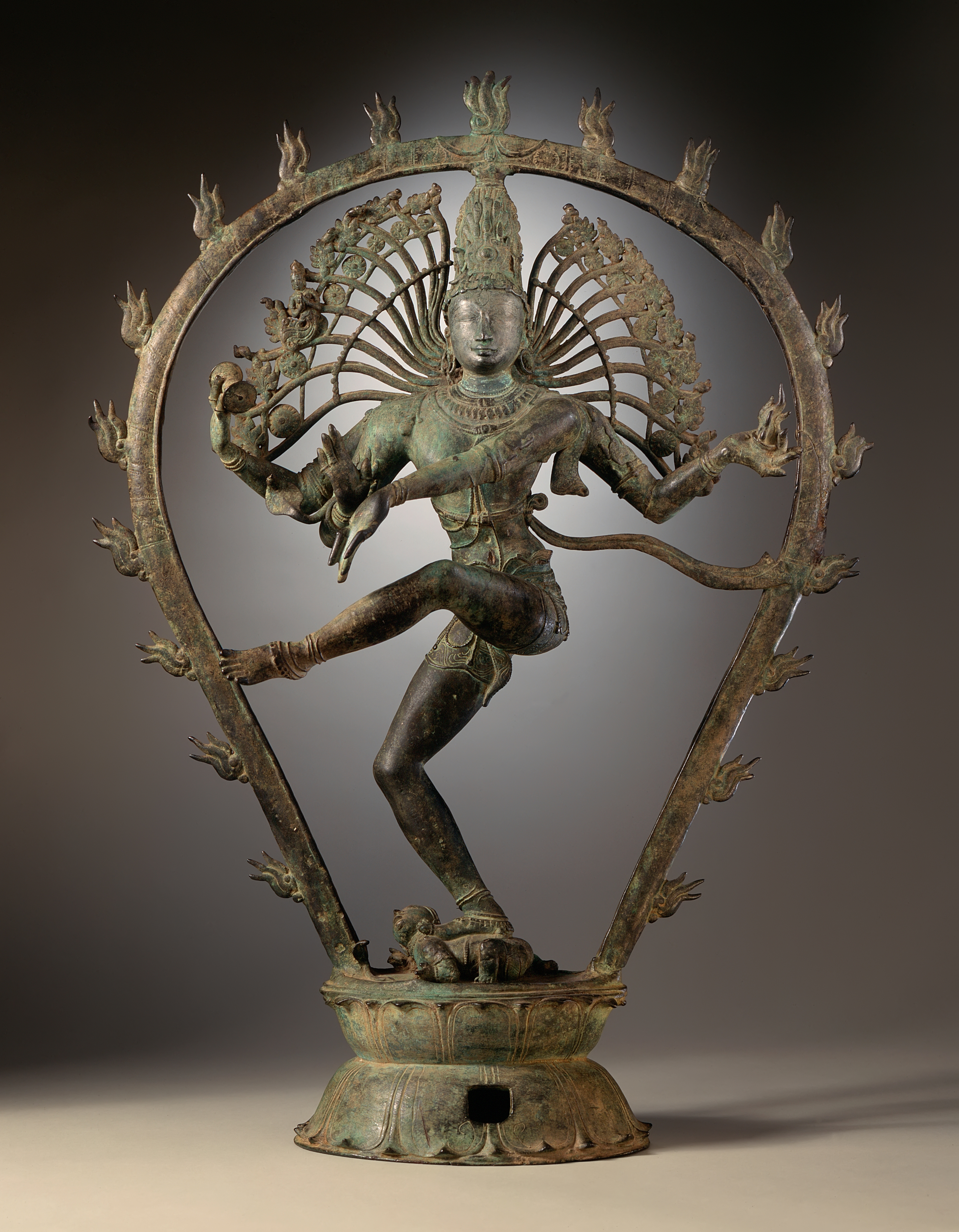
Rihanna channels the Hindu God Shiva in the music video.

The video's concept shows Rihanna travelling around various locations "looking for a male partner who will please her". The video begins with a shot of flowing water which appears to be set in a dark swamp-like area. Rihanna's head is then shown hovering above the water as she begins the first verse. She is then presented as a reptilian creature as part of her back rises above the water. Rihanna then exits the water, showing a scale ensemble, much like a reptile, which covers her breasts. As the bridge begins, a close up of Rihanna's face is shown, half covered in a shawl, identical to the single cover. Choreography then begins as the singer is shown with a group of male dancers behind her, wearing tribal costumes in what appears to be an Egyptian desert. Rihanna dons a zebra-print outfit with oversized red trousers as she puts on a fast-paced routine against the backdrop of pyramids. Empty tree branches are shown, as well as a fire and a starry sky. Scenes of a nude Rihanna are intercut, holding a whip made of hair, while simultaneously covering her breasts.

As the second verse begins, Rihanna is seen in an African hut lying on the floor, surrounded by female dancers. She performs on the floor, in one moment managing to put her leg over her head, before standing up and again, performing a dance routine. The performers are seen to make the shape of an eye, with Rihanna in the centre as the pupil. In this scene she wears a black lace ensemble with a new wild curly hairstyle. This is followed with the singer lying in a large birds' nest and then goes back to the singer with her previous wild hairstyle, performing a complex dance routine with female dancers, this time with fluorescent green effects. The penultimate scene shows Rihanna in a long dress which lights up neon red, while the singer has sequins across her face. She then appears to channel Hindu god Shiva as multiple arms surround her body. In the final scene, Rihanna and her male background dancers seen previously, slowly descend back underwater into the swamp; Rihanna's head completely submerges below the water.

=== Reception ===
The video received 4.93 million hits in its first 24 hours, breaking the record at the time for the most views within that duration. It received positive reviews from critics with many noting Rihanna's indulgence into extended choreography. Kia Makarechi from The Huffington Post commented, "Rihanna doesn't normally do extended dance scenes, so it's interesting to see the singer go the path of the Britneys and Christinas before her and delve into some deeper choreography." Amanda Dobbins from New York Magazine echoed the review stating, "Even though Rihanna is maybe not on a Beyoncé or Britney-circa-2000 level when it comes to the super-involved choreography, she at least leaves it all out on the floor." Sarah Maloy of Billboard made note of the Hindu iconography displayed in the video and made comparisons of the video's distorted images to that of "We Found Love". Nicole James of MTV praised the video stating that Rihanna "dances her ass off" and compared it to Jennifer Lopez's video for "Waiting for Tonight". The video received two MTV Video Music Award nominations, including Best Choreography Video and Best Visual Effects.

== Live performances ==
Rihanna performed "Where Have You Been" for the first time live at the 2012 Post-Grammy Charity Fundraiser, along with "We Found Love", on February 13, 2012. On April 15, 2012, Rihanna performed the song at the Coachella Valley Music and Arts Festival, again with "We Found Love". On May 5, 2012, Rihanna performed the song on Saturday Night Live in the United States. The performance featured an aesthetic similar to that of the music video; the SNL set was decorated in a One Thousand and One Nights fashion. Rihanna and her backup dancers performed a highly choreographed dance routine, the same as the music video, and wore Arabian inspired outfits. She also performed the song at the 2012 Robin Hood Benefit in New York. The performance was in Cleopatra style. The singer performed the song on American Idol's season 11 finale on May 23, 2012. Rihanna performed "Where Have You Been" at Radio 1's Hackney Weekend on June 24, 2012, as the tenth song on the set list. The performance featured a giant sphinx on the stage. She also performed the song at the 2016 MTV Video Music Awards. "Where Have You Been" was also included in the set list of Rihanna's performance at the Super Bowl LVII halftime show, mashed up with Only Girl (In the World).

== Track listing ==
- Digital download
1. "Where Have You Been" – 4:03
- Digital download (remixes; version 1)
1. "Where Have You Been" (Hardwell club mix) – 6:34
2. "Where Have You Been" (Hardwell instrumental) – 6:34
3. "Where Have You Been" (Papercha$er remix) – 6:35
4. "Where Have You Been" (Papercha$er instrumental) – 6:34
5. "Where Have You Been" (Hector Fonseca radio edit) – 3:56
6. "Where Have You Been" (Hector Fonseca remix) – 8:00
7. "Where Have You Been" (Hector Fonseca dub) – 6:38
8. "Where Have You Been" (Vice club mix) – 5:35
9. "Where Have You Been" (Vice instrumental) – 5:36
- CD (2-track)
1. "Where Have You Been" – 4:02
2. "Where Have You Been" (Hector Fonseca radio edit) – 3:57
- Digital download (remixes; version 2)
1. "Where Have You Been" (Hardwell club mix) – 6:34
2. "Where Have You Been" (Papercha$er remix) – 6:35
3. "Where Have You Been" (Hector Fonseca radio edit) – 3:56
4. "Where Have You Been" (Vice edit) – 3:39
- Digital download (the Calvin Harris extended remix)
1. "Where Have You Been" (the Calvin Harris extended remix) – 6:01

== Credits and personnel ==
Credits are adapted from the liner notes of Talk That Talk.

Recording

- Recorded at Eightysevenfourteen Studios, Los Angeles, California; Eyeknowasecret Studio, Brentwood, California.

Sample

- Contains elements from the composition "I've Been Everywhere", written by Geoff Mack under Unichappel Music Inc (BMI).

Personnel

- Vocals – Rihanna, Ester Dean (background vocals)
- Songwriting – Ester Dean, Lukasz Gottwald, Calvin Harris, Henry Walter, Geoff Mack
- Production, instruments, programming – Dr. Luke, Cirkut, Calvin Harris
- Vocal engineering and recording – Kuk Harrell, Marcos Tovar
- Assistant vocal recording – Jennifer Rosales
- Engineering – Aubry "Big Juice" Delaine, Clint Gibbs
- Mixing – Serban Ghenea

Music video

- Dave Meyers via Radical Media – direction
- Danny Hiele – direction of photography
- Hi-Hat – choreographing
- Mel Ottenberg – wardrobe stylist
- Adam Selman – set designer

== Charts ==
=== Weekly charts ===
2011–2013 weekly chart performance
Chart (2011–2013)	Peak position
Australia (ARIA)	6
Austria (Ö3 Austria Top 40)	20
Belgium (Ultratop 50 Flanders)	9
Belgium (Ultratop 50 Wallonia)	6
Brazil Hot 100 Airplay (Billboard Brasil)	37
Brazil (Brazil Hot Pop)	1
Bulgaria Airplay (BAMP)	3
Canada Hot 100 (Billboard)	5
CIS Airplay (TopHit)	38
Czech Republic Airplay (ČNS IFPI)	5
Denmark (Tracklisten)	4
Euro Digital Song Sales (Billboard)	4
Finnish Download Chart	13
France (SNEP)	2
Germany (GfK)	17
Greece (IFPI Greece)	5
Honduras (Honduras Top 50)	4
Hungary (Rádiós Top 40)	2
Iceland (Lagalistinn)	13
Ireland (IRMA)	8
Israel (Media Forest)	2
Italy (FIMI)	23
Japan Hot 100 (Billboard)	83
Lebanon (The Official Lebanese Top 20)	4
Mexico Anglo (Monitor Latino)	1
Mexico (Billboard Mexican Airplay)	1
Netherlands (Dutch Top 40)	12
Netherlands (Single Top 100)	15
New Zealand (Recorded Music NZ)	4
Norway (VG-lista)	8
Portugal (Billboard)	4
Romania (Airplay 100)	28
Russia Airplay (TopHit)	24
Scottish Singles Sales (Official Charts)	4
Slovakia Airplay (ČNS IFPI)	16
South Korea Foreign (Circle)	36
Spain (Promusicae)	16
Sweden (Sverigetopplistan)	27
Switzerland (Schweizer Hitparade)	15
UK Singles (Official Charts)	6
UK Dance (Official Charts)	1
Ukraine Airplay (TopHit)	42
US Billboard Hot 100	5
US Adult Pop Airplay (Billboard)	20
US Dance Club Songs (Billboard)	1
US Dance Airplay (Billboard)	1
US Hot R&B/Hip-Hop Songs (Billboard)	56
US Latin Pop Airplay (Billboard)	4
US Pop Airplay (Billboard)	3
US Rhythmic Airplay (Billboard)	1
US Tropical Airplay (Billboard)	20
Venezuela Pop Rock General (Record Report)	2

2023 weekly chart performance
Chart (2023)	Peak position
Canadian Digital Song Sales (Billboard)	41
Global 200 (Billboard)	106
US Hot Dance/Electronic Songs (Billboard)	8
US Digital Song Sales (Billboard)	20

2025 weekly chart performance
Chart (2025)	Peak position
Global 200 (Billboard)	97
Greece International (IFPI)	38
Portugal (AFP)	118
UK Hip Hop/R&B (Official Charts)	25

=== Year-end charts ===
2012 year-end chart performance
Chart (2012)	Position
Australia (ARIA)	53
Belgium (Ultratop 50 Flanders)	39
Belgium (Ultratop 50 Wallonia)	25
Brazil (Crowley)	68
Canada (Canadian Hot 100)	26
Denmark (Tracklisten)	29
France (SNEP)	23
Greece (IFPI Greece)	41
Hungary (Rádiós Top 40)	28
Hungary (Dance Top 40)	33
Israel (Media Forest)	15
Italy (FIMI)	80
Lebanon (The Official Lebanese Top 20)	5
Netherlands (Dutch Top 40)	48
Netherlands (Dutch Top 100)	55
New Zealand (Recorded Music NZ)	27
Poland (ZPAV)	9
Russia Airplay (TopHit)	152
Spain (PROMUSICAE)	47
Sweden (Sverigetopplistan)	51
UK Singles (OCC)	32
US Billboard Hot 100	21
US Dance Club Songs (Billboard)	5
US Dance/Mix Show Airplay (Billboard)	2
US Hot Latin Songs (Billboard)	43
US Pop Airplay (Billboard)	16
US Radio Songs (Billboard)	11
US Rhythmic (Billboard)	9
Venezuela (Record Report)	12

2023 year-end chart performance
Chart (2023)	Position
US Hot Dance/Electronic Songs (Billboard)	71

== Certifications and sales ==
Certifications
Region	Certification	Certified units/sales
Australia (ARIA)	7× Platinum	490,000^{‡}
Belgium (BRMA)	Gold	15,000^{*}
Brazil (Pro-Música Brasil)	2× Diamond	500,000^{‡}
Denmark (IFPI Danmark)	2× Platinum	180,000^{‡}
France	—	115,000
Germany (BVMI)	Platinum	300,000^{‡}
Italy (FIMI)	Platinum	30,000^{‡}
New Zealand (RMNZ)	3× Platinum	90,000^{‡}
Spain (Promusicae)	Gold	30,000^{‡}
Sweden (GLF)	2× Platinum	80,000^{‡}
United Kingdom (BPI)	2× Platinum	1,200,000^{‡}
United States (RIAA)	6× Platinum	6,000,000^{‡}
Streaming
Denmark (IFPI Danmark)	Platinum	1,800,000^{†}
Greece (IFPI Greece)	2× Platinum	4,000,000^{†}
^{*} Sales figures based on certification alone.^{‡} Sales+streaming figures based on certification alone.^{†} Streaming-only figures based on certification alone.

== Release history ==
Release history
Region	Date	Format(s)	Version	Ref.
United States	April 17, 2012	Contemporary hit radio; rhythmic contemporary radio	Original	
Italy	April 27, 2012	Radio airplay	Original	
Italy	May 11, 2012	Digital download	Remixes (version 1)	
United States	May 22, 2012	Digital download	Remixes (version 1)	
Germany	May 25, 2012	CD	2-track	
Germany	May 25, 2012	Digital download	Remixes (version 2)	
United States	May 28, 2012	Adult contemporary radio	Original	
United States	June 19, 2012	Digital download	The Calvin Harris extended mix	
United Kingdom	September 6, 2012	Digital download	Remixes (version 1)	

== See also ==
- List of Billboard Dance Club Songs number ones of 2012
