= Mossburn Branch =

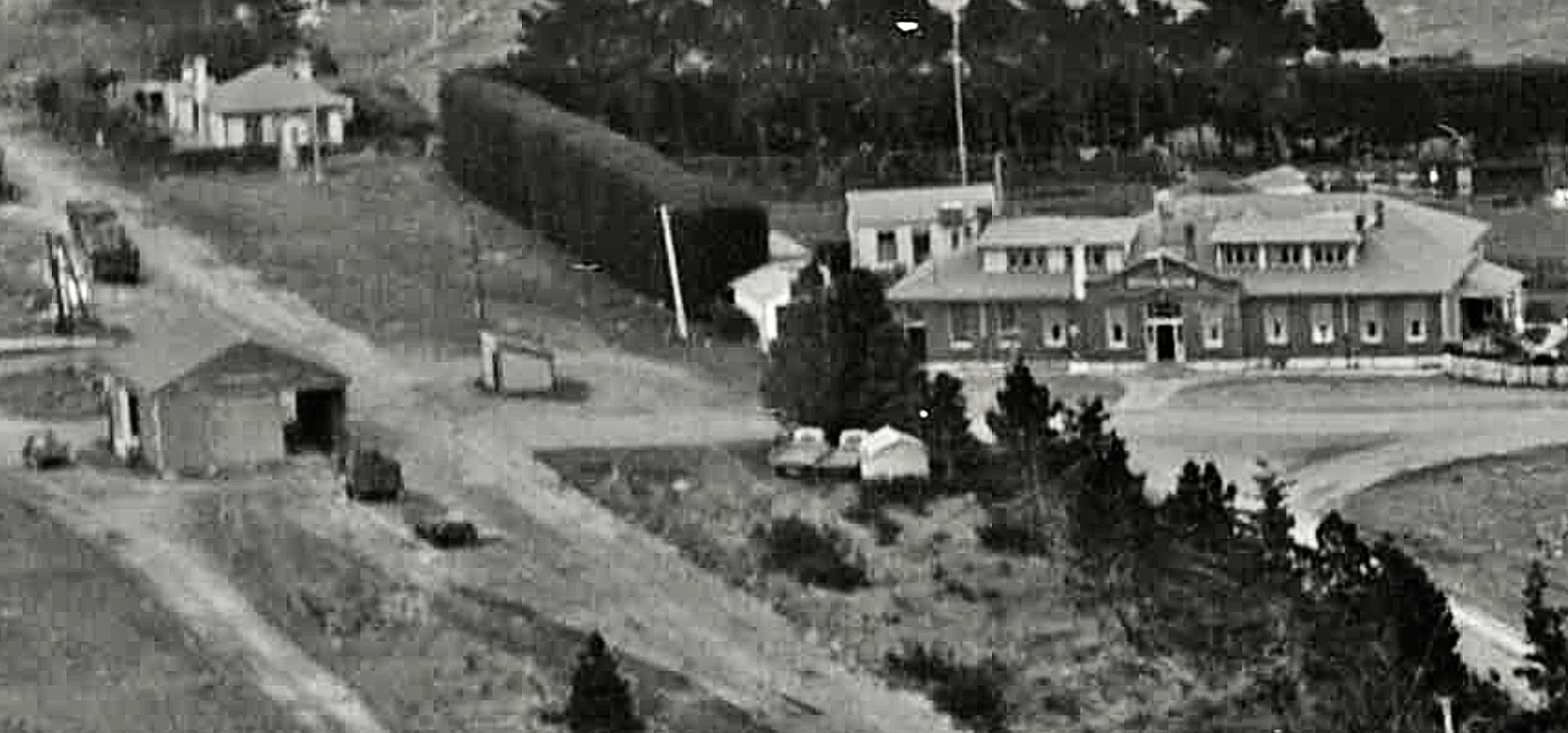
- Mossburn railway station and hotel in 1951

Overview
- Status: Closed
- Owner: NZ Railways Department
- Locale: Southland, New Zealand
- Termini: Mararoa Junction; Mossburn
- Stations: 3

Service
- Type: Heavy rail
- System: New Zealand Government Railways (NZGR)
- Operator(s): NZ Railways Department

History
- Opened: 1887
- Closed: 1982

Technical
- Line length: 16.9 kilometres (10.5 mi)
- Number of tracks: Single
- Character: Rural
- Track gauge: 3 ft 6 in (1,067 mm)

Map

The Mossburn Branch was a branch line railway in New Zealand from Lumsden on the Kingston Branch to the town of Mossburn in northern Southland. Construction began in 1879, Mossburn was reached in 1887, and the line closed in 1982. It was operated by the New Zealand Railways Department.

== Construction ==
The line was intended to open up land to the west of Lumsden and perhaps even reach Manapouri or Te Anau in Fiordland. Construction began in July 1879 and the line left the Kingston Branch just outside the north side of Lumsden at a location named Mararoa Junction that was simply a set of points. The only real obstacle was the Ōreti River, which was crossed by the end of March 1880, though an 1880 Royal Commission into New Zealand's railways was so unimpressed by the line's prospects that it declared "the railway bridge over the Oreti should be decked over and thrown open for dray traffic." Nonetheless, construction progressed onwards towards Mossburn, albeit slowly due to the effects of the Long Depression of the 1880s. The first three kilometres opened to Castle Rock on 1 April 1881, but almost five years passed before the next section, six and a half kilometres to Murray Creek, was opened on 13 March 1886. The final six and a half kilometres were built much quicker and the line was opened all the way to Mossburn on 21 January 1887. No proposals to continue construction westwards ever had a serious chance of being realised.

== Stations ==
Only three stations were on the Mossburn line (in brackets is the distance from Mararoa Junction):

- Castle Rock (3.24 km) had buildings put up at the siding by a Mr Thomas in January 1882. In 1889 a petition asked for the shelter shed at Murray Creek to be moved to Castle Rock and, by 1898, there was a shelter shed, platform and loading bank. Until 1937 a nearby siding served a ballast pit. The station closed to all traffic on 21 June 1981.
- Murray Creek (9.7 km) flag station opened with a 7th class station building, platform and loading bank and by 1898 also had a cart approach. It closed to all traffic on 13 October 1957.
- Mossburn (16.29 km) had a shelter shed, platform, cart approach, loading bank, 40ft x 30ft goods shed, cattle yards and water supply by 1898. A turntable was considered, but by 1895 it had a reversing triangle, which it retained until the line closed. The station was modernised in 1966, including installation of an electric overhead gantry crane.

The end of rails was just beyond Mossburn station, 16.9 km from the junction.

== Operation ==
Traffic on the line was never heavy until the 1960s; for many years, two mixed trains ran a week from Lumsden. These trains carried both passengers and goods, with the usual inbound cargo consisting of agricultural lime and fertiliser, and wool and livestock outbound. Passengers were no longer carried after 4 October 1937, and the low freight figures implied that the line was set for a slow descent into oblivion. It was one of 10 lines listed for closure when the Government cut back on railway expenditure in 1930.

The Mossburn Branch did not have a predictable demise, however. Mossburn was the nearest railhead to the Manapouri hydro-electric project and the branch suddenly became very busy with traffic not only for Manapouri but also for other government schemes in the area that centred on the development of farming. Mossburn station and yard were wholly re-organised; a modern station building replaced the previous shelter shed and a station master was appointed. A train ran from Invercargill every weekday, with allowances made for a second when required. As well as relevant freight for the Manapouri project, the line also carried significant quantities of livestock, fertiliser, and serpentine for local fertiliser manufacturing plants. It was not until around 1980 that the various government projects wound down and required the railway less. The line reverted to a twice-weekly level of service, with trains running from Invercargill on Tuesdays and Thursdays. Traffic from this point became economically unsustainable and the branch closed on 16 December 1982, the same day as the section of the Kingston Branch from Makarewa to Lumsden.

== Today ==
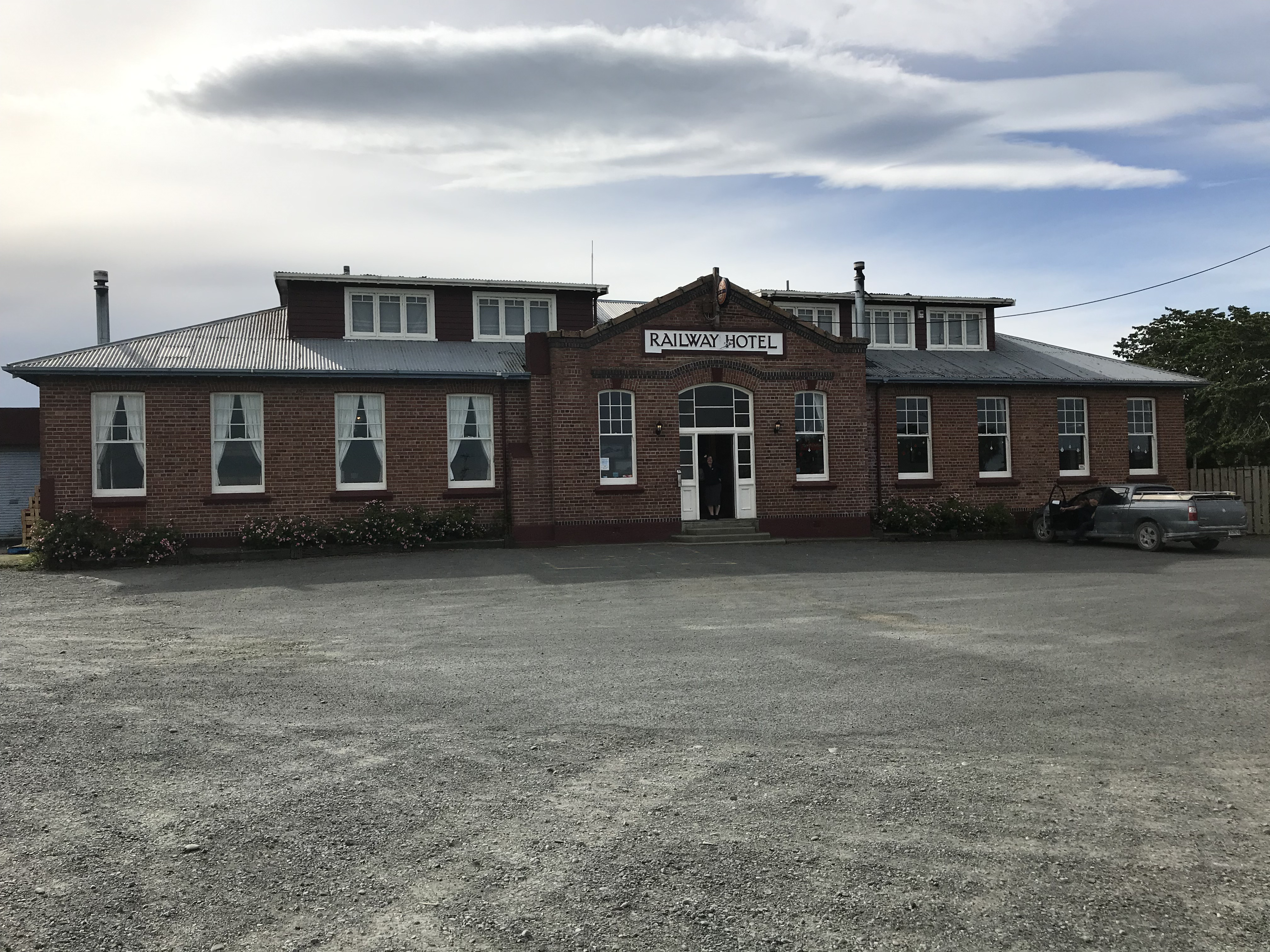
Mossburn Railway Hotel in 2019

Very little remains of the Mossburn Branch. Most of the formation is still visible, but due to the flat nature of the land, it is insubstantial, lacking cuttings or embankments. A new road bridge across the Ōreti River has been built and all traces of the railway bridge have been obliterated except for a few rails pointing to nowhere on the Lumsden bank. In Mossburn, a hotel has "Railway Hotel" moulded into its concrete façade. Nearby, the site of Mossburn's yard has been mostly bulldozed flat and only the loading bank and a few rails and sleepers remain. The Mossburn yard goods shed was relocated to the Mosgiel Station yard in 1983, where it remains to this day.

== See also ==
- Main South Line
- Waimea Plains Railway
- Kingston Branch
- Waikaia/Switzers Branch
- Waikaka branch
- Wyndham/Glenham Branch
