= Ladislav Vodička =

- Born: Ladislav Vodička; 10 January 1931
- Origin: Prague, Czechoslovakia
- Died: 7 March 1999 (aged 68)

Ladislav Vodička (10 January 1931 in Prague – 7 March 1999) was a Czech country music singer and songwriter. He performed together with the Country Beat Jiřího Brabce band and later with his own band called Vodomilové.

Ladislav Vodička graduated from the Faculty of Mechanical Engineering at the Czech Technical University in Prague in 1955. His early musical experience includes playing violin in the Louny Philharmonic Orchestra. His singing career started in 1961 in an amateur band called Tempest. In 1966, Jiří Brabec offered him a job as a singer in his country band, which was a major turn in his career. In the same year, the band started to perform on the stage of the famous and popular Semafor theatre, a national cultural hotspot of the late 1960s. By the end of 1960s, he became a well-known recording artist. Most popular are probably his Czech cover versions of famous American country songs.

In 1976, he joined a band of musicians associated with the Faculty of Hydrology at his alma mater. The band then changed its name to Vodomilové (or "Water Lovers" in English, the name of the band being a pun referring to Vodička's surname, which is a diminutive of "water" in Czech, as well as to the background of other members of the band) and Vodička became the lead singer.

Vodička ended his musical career in the early 1980s. In 1996, he staged a short comeback by recording his final album. His affinity for the country music and his distinctive deep voice earned him a nickname "the Czech Johnny Cash."

== Selected discography ==
Ladislav Vodička recorded two albums and many singles during his career. Especially after the emergence of the CD format, many compilation albums of his previous recordings have also been released.

=== Albums ===
- 1975 – Odjezd v 15:30, aneb Mimořádný vlak Ladislava Vodičky (Departing at 15:30, or the Special Express of Ladislav Vodička)
- 1996 – Starej Voda po dvaceti letech (The Old 'Water' after Twenty Years)

=== Selected hits ===
- Byl to Shane (1970, It Was Shane) – lyrics: Pavel Vrba, music: Jiří Brabec
- Je to zlé (1970, It Is Bad) – Czech cover version of the Ring of Fire by Johnny Cash
- Já tu zemi znám (1974, I Know That Country) – Czech version of the famous I've Been Everywhere song
- Řidič, ten tvrdej chleba má (1974, Driver's Got a Tough Livelihood) – Czech cover version of There Ain't No Easy Run by Dave Dudley
