= White Hill Wind Farm =

Wind farm in New Zealand

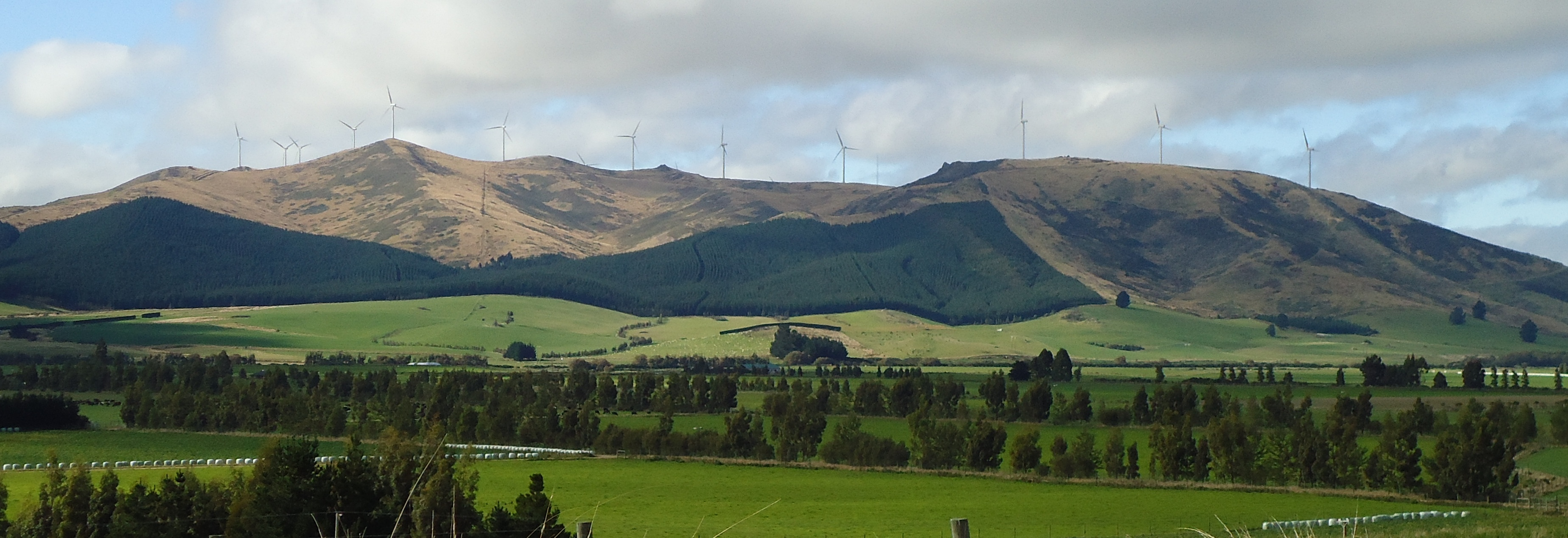
- Country: New Zealand
- Location: Southland Region
- Coordinates: 45°45′9″S 168°16′18″E
- Status: Operational
- Construction began: March 2006
- Commission date: October 2007
- Owner: Meridian

Wind farm
- Type: Onshore
- Hub height: 68 m (223 ft)
- Rotor diameter: 80 m (262 ft)
- Rated wind speed: 15 m/s (54 km/h; 34 mph)
- Site area: 24 km^{2} (9.27 sq mi)

Power generation
- Units operational: 29
- Make and model: Vestas: V80-2.0MW
- Nameplate capacity: 58 MW

The White Hill Wind Farm is a wind farm in New Zealand operated by Meridian Energy. It was officially opened in 2007.

It is located six kilometres south-east of Mossburn in the Southland Region of the South Island. The wind farm covers approximately 24 square kilometers of mainly forestry land.

== See also ==
- Wind power in New Zealand
