= Harvey Miles =

American politician (1931–2012)

Harvey Wayne Miles (October 25, 1931 – July 17, 2012) was the final mayor of Renner, Texas.

Miles was born in Center City, Texas and grew up in rural Mills County, Texas. Miles was a plumber by trade and served as a plumbing inspector for the city of Odessa, Texas in addition to running his own plumbing business.
