= Mildenhall =

Mildenhall may refer to:

== Places in England ==
- Mildenhall, Suffolk, town
  - Mildenhall Rural District, a former district of West Suffolk
  - RAF Mildenhall, air force station
  - Mildenhall Treasure, Roman silver hoard
    - The Mildenhall Treasure, a book about the matter, by Roald Dahl
  - Mildenhall Town F.C.
- Mildenhall, Wiltshire, village

== People with the surname ==
- Andrew Mildenhall (born 1966), English cricketer
- Bill Mildenhall (born 1953), Australian basketball player and referee, and Australian rules football player
- Bruce Mildenhall (born 1953), Australian politician
- John Mildenhall (1560–1614), British explorer and adventurer, one of the first British travellers to make an overland journey to India
- Neil Mildenhall (born 1968), Australian rules footballer
- Steve Mildenhall (born 1979), English footballer
- William James Mildenhall (1891–1962), early photographer of Canberra, Australia
  - The Mildenhall photographic collection, created by William James Mildenhall

== Other ==
- "Mildenhall", a song by American dream pop band The Shins from their 2017 album, Heartworms
