= Mossburn =

- Town
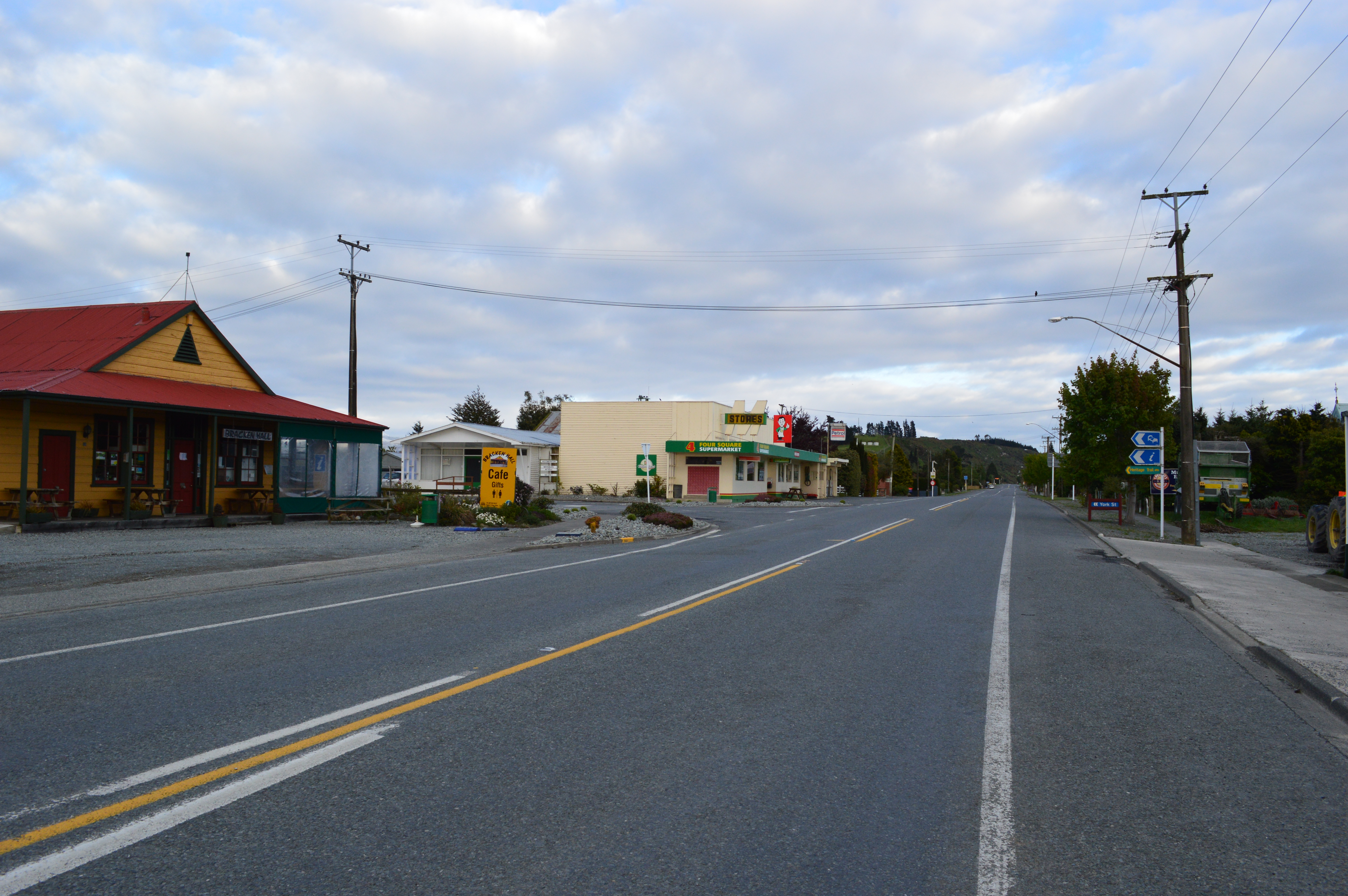
- State Highway 94, the main street of Mossburn
- Interactive map of Mossburn
- Coordinates: 45°40′S 168°15′E
- Country: New Zealand
- Island: South Island
- Region: Southland region
- Territorial authorities of New Zealand: Southland District
- Ward: Mararoa Waimea Ward
- Community: Northern Community
- Electorates: Southland; Te Tai Tonga (Māori)

Government
  - Territorial authority: Southland District Council
  - Regional council: Southland Regional Council
  - Mayor of Southland: Rob Scott
  - Southland MP: Joseph Mooney
  - Te Tai Tonga MP: Tākuta Ferris

Area
  - Total: 1.34 km^{2} (0.52 sq mi)
- Elevation: 297 m (974 ft)

Population (June 2025)
  - Total: 180
  - Density: 130/km^{2} (350/sq mi)
- Time zone: UTC+12 (New Zealand Standard Time)
  - Summer (DST): UTC+13 (New Zealand Daylight Time)
- Postcode: 9747
- Local iwi: Ngāi Tahu

Mossburn is a small town in the northern Southland region of New Zealand. It is situated 113 km south of Queenstown, 59 km east of Te Anau and 100 km north of Invercargill.

== History ==
Mossburn was named by surveyor J.T. Thomson, likely after Mossburn in Dumfriesshire, Scotland, part of the common practice of giving Scottish names to Southland towns. In the late 1870s and 1880s, Mossburn began as a small wagoning centre and stopping place on stock and supply routes in northern Southland.

A hotel and store opened, and postal and telegraph services were operable by 1882, marking its transition from a way-stop to a rural service town.

The Mossburn Branch was built in the late 19th century to support farming and settlement, reaching Mossburn in 1887 after slow construction during an economic downturn. It carried both passengers and freight, though passenger services ended in 1937 as road transport became more popular. For much of its life the branch was lightly used, but it became strategically important during the 1960s–1970s when Mossburn served as the railhead for major hydro-electric projects, especially the Manapouri Power Scheme. During this period, freight traffic increased significantly and Mossburn briefly became a busy inland terminal. Once these projects finished, rail traffic declined sharply. The branch closed in 1982, the same day as the connecting section of the Kingston Branch, ending rail services to the town. Today, little physical infrastructure remains and the railway remains an important part of the town's historical identity.

From the early 1900s, Mossburn grew around sheep farming, which dominated the local economy. During the Great Depression in the 1930s, wool prices fell, affecting farmers’ incomes. Like many rural towns, Mossburn experienced economic hardship, but farming kept the town viable. By the late 20th century, tourism-related services became important.

== Demographics ==
Mossburn is described as a rural settlement by Statistics New Zealand. It covers 1.34 km^{2} (0.52 sq mi), and had an estimated population of 180 as of June 2025, with a population density of 134 people per km^{2}. It is part of the larger Mossburn statistical area.

Historical population for the settlement
Year	Pop.	±% p.a.
2006	195	—
2013	174	−1.61%
2018	180	+0.68%

Mossburn settlement had a population of 180 at the 2018 New Zealand census, an increase of 6 people (3.4%) since the 2013 census, and a decrease of 15 people (−7.7%) since the 2006 census. There were 78 households, comprising 99 males and 84 females, giving a sex ratio of 1.18 males per female, with 30 people (16.7%) aged under 15 years, 30 (16.7%) aged 15 to 29, 84 (46.7%) aged 30 to 64, and 36 (20.0%) aged 65 or older.

Ethnicities were 85.0% European/Pākehā, 15.0% Māori, 1.7% Asian, and 1.7% other ethnicities. People may identify with more than one ethnicity.

Although some people chose not to answer the census's question about religious affiliation, 56.7% had no religion, 25.0% were Christian, 1.7% were Hindu, 1.7% were Buddhist and 3.3% had other religions.

Of those at least 15 years old, 12 (8.0%) people had a bachelor's or higher degree, and 51 (34.0%) people had no formal qualifications. 18 people (12.0%) earned over $70,000 compared to 17.2% nationally. The employment status of those at least 15 was that 84 (56.0%) people were employed full-time, 24 (16.0%) were part-time, and 6 (4.0%) were unemployed.

=== Mossburn statistical area ===
Mossburn statistical area covers 2,740.57 km^{2} (1,058.14 sq mi) and had an estimated population of 1,380 as of June 2025, with a population density of 0.5 people per km^{2}.

Historical population for the statistical area
Year	Pop.	±% p.a.
2006	1,110	—
2013	1,197	+1.08%
2018	1,209	+0.20%

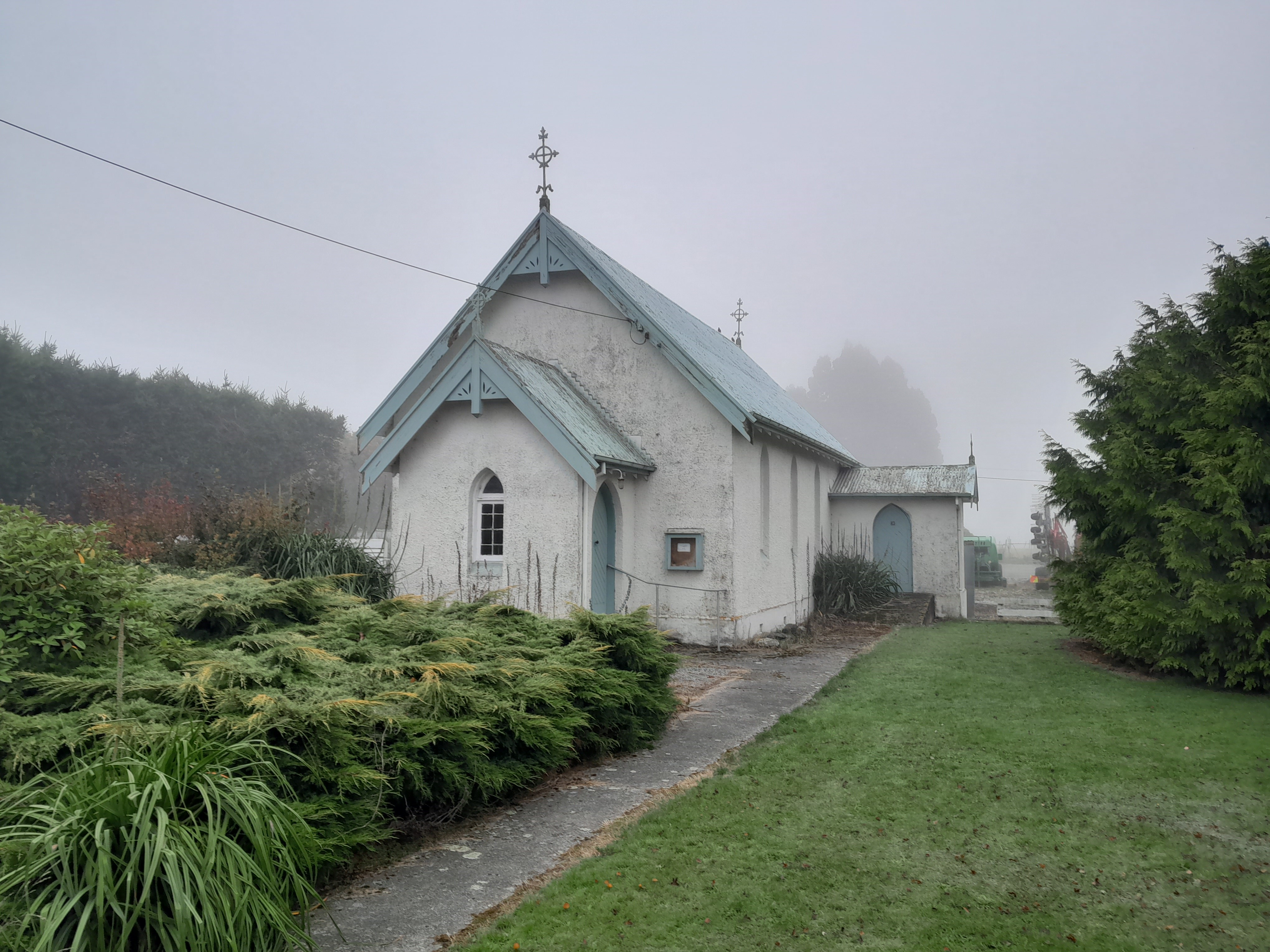
St Joan of Arc Catholic Church, Mossburn (2023)

Mossburn had a population of 1,209 at the 2018 New Zealand census, an increase of 12 people (1.0%) since the 2013 census, and an increase of 99 people (8.9%) since the 2006 census. There were 471 households, comprising 657 males and 555 females, giving a sex ratio of 1.18 males per female. The median age was 35.2 years (compared with 37.4 years nationally), with 285 people (23.6%) aged under 15 years, 219 (18.1%) aged 15 to 29, 585 (48.4%) aged 30 to 64, and 123 (10.2%) aged 65 or older.

Ethnicities were 82.9% European/Pākehā, 7.2% Māori, 1.0% Pasifika, 10.4% Asian, and 3.2% other ethnicities. People may identify with more than one ethnicity.

The percentage of people born overseas was 19.1, compared with 27.1% nationally.

Although some people chose not to answer the census's question about religious affiliation, 52.4% had no religion, 34.5% were Christian, 2.2% were Hindu, 0.5% were Muslim, 1.5% were Buddhist and 2.0% had other religions.

Of those at least 15 years old, 144 (15.6%) people had a bachelor's or higher degree, and 183 (19.8%) people had no formal qualifications. The median income was $38,400, compared with $31,800 nationally. 135 people (14.6%) earned over $70,000 compared to 17.2% nationally. The employment status of those at least 15 was that 585 (63.3%) people were employed full-time, 150 (16.2%) were part-time, and 15 (1.6%) were unemployed.

== Agriculture ==
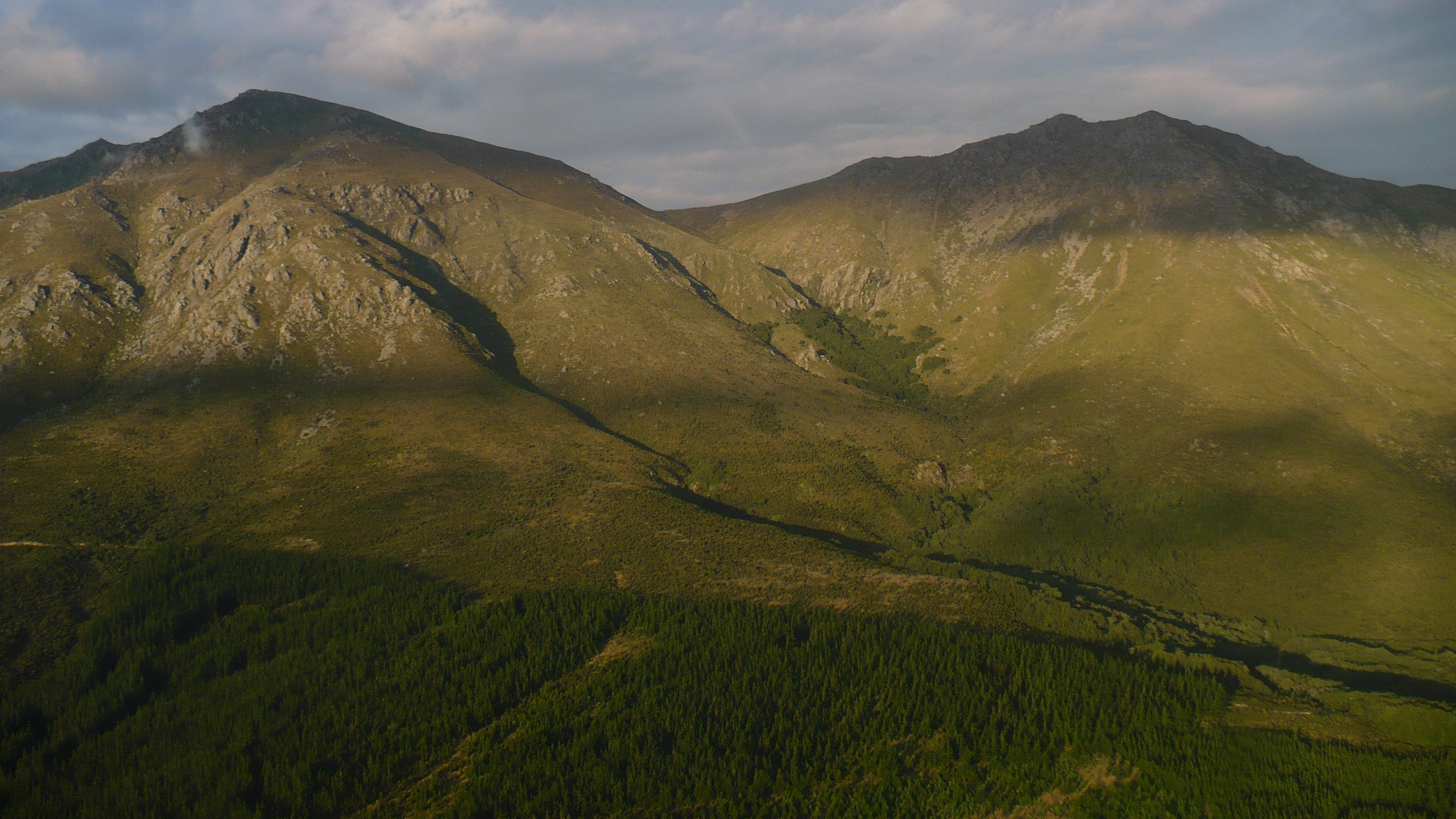
West Dome, aerial view from helicopter over Mossburn

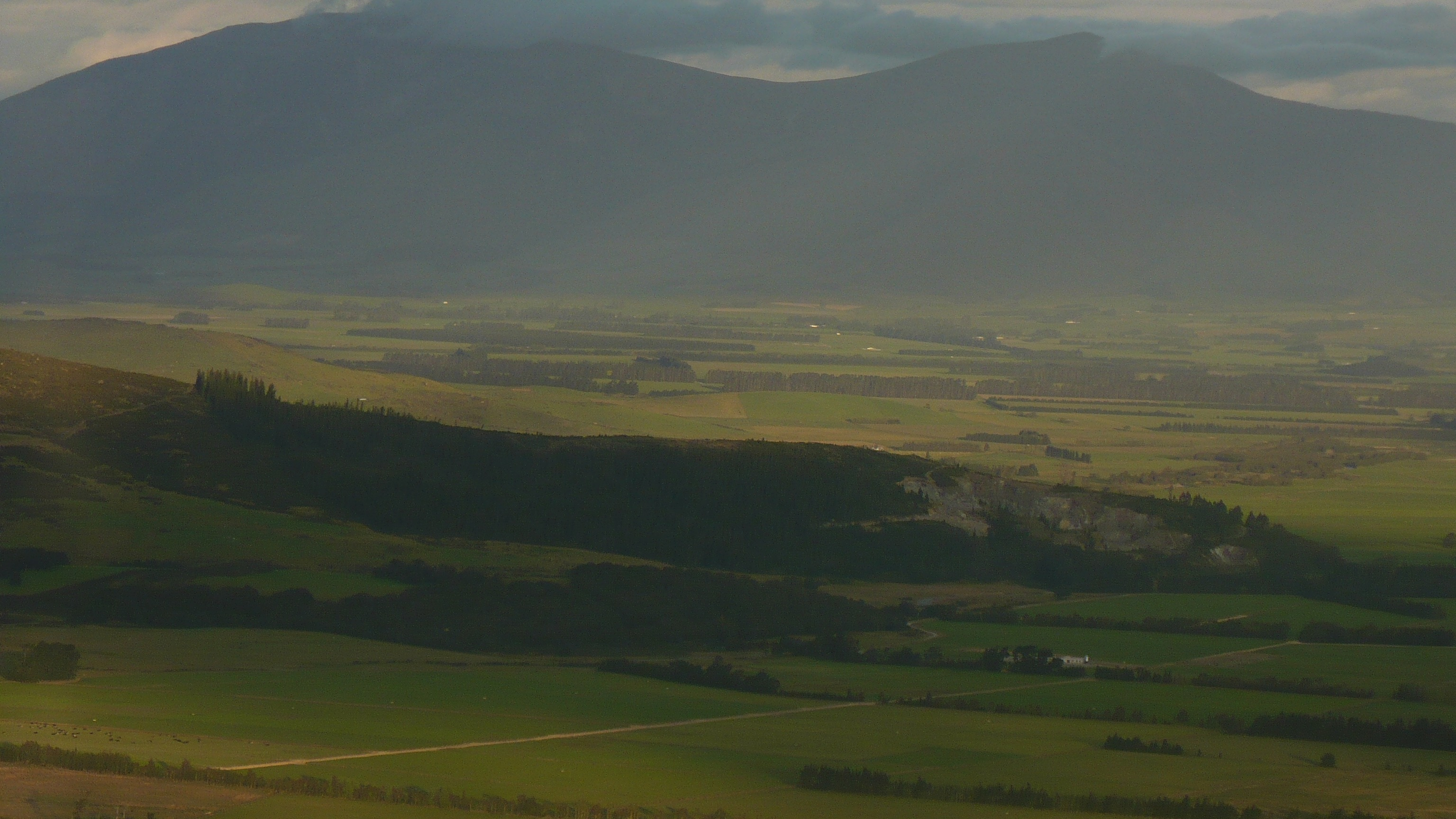
Mid Dome aerial view with Waimea plains in the foreground

The town's main industry is agriculture, with many dairy, cattle, deer, and sheep farms nearby. The town was originally based situated around the four original stations; Centre Hill, Castlerock, West Dome and Dunrobin. Dairy farming has become the major industry of the area. Many large dairy farms have been established over the past ten years, converting from past sheep and other mixed farming activities. .

In the 1890s Mossburn farmer George Chewings developed a successful grass seed for the district’s infertile soil. Chewings fescue Festuca rubra subsp. commutata was an ideal constituent in lawn turfs around the world and was used on the playing surface Wimbledon and landing strips in World War 2.

== Deer Capital ==
Mossburn lays claim to being the Deer Capital of New Zealand. This is based on the origins of the successful live deer recovery in the wild by helicopter and subsequent first deer farm in New Zealand being established in 1972. This was spurred on by the high venison prices at the time and the near epidemic population levels of red deer in the wild after their introduction earlier in the century. There still remains many deer farms in the community and the Silver Fern Farms venison processing plant which is a major employer for the community.

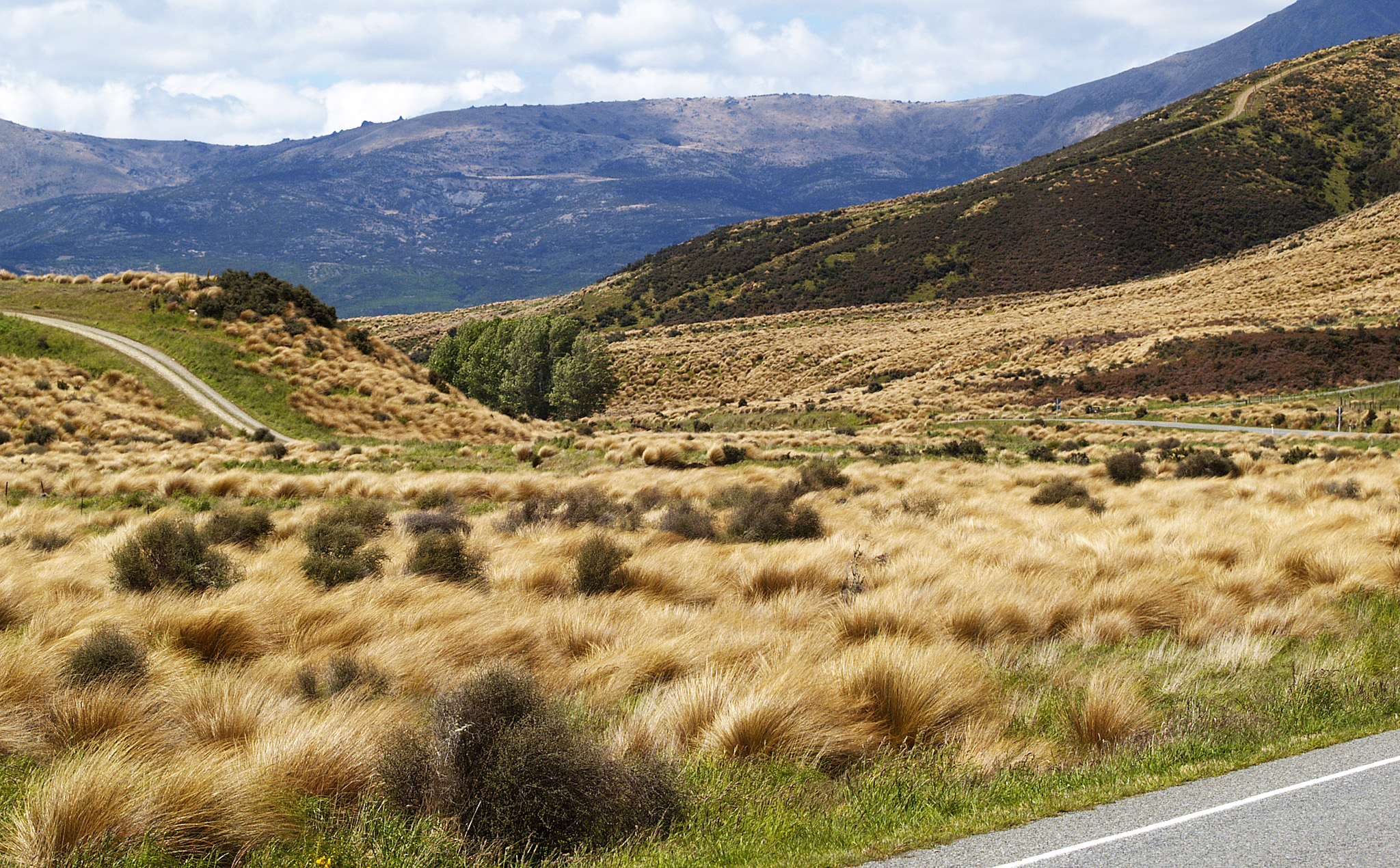
Tussock reserve west of Mossburn

== Rail ==
Mossburn's greatest increase in economic activity came as a result of the construction of the Manapouri Power Station. The Mossburn Branch railway had terminated in the town since 1887 and was the closest railway terminus to the project. Previously, the line had been served by two mixed trains of both passengers and freight per week (only freight after 4 October 1937) from Lumsden on the Kingston Branch, but with the commencement of the Manapouri project as well as other government development programmes such as agricultural expansion, one and sometimes two trains would arrive daily from Invercargill. By the start of the 1980s, these projects were complete and the railway closed on 13 December 1982. The Railway Hotel (built 1922) remains as one of the town's social centres, and subsequent old railway lines have been converted into the Around the Mountains Cycle Trail.

== Cycle Way ==
Around the Mountains Cycle Trail was one of the New Zealand Cycle Trail Quick-Start projects, with $4 million being allocated to complete the Walter Peak to Mossburn stage. Stage One was opened by Deputy Prime Minister, Bill English, in a ceremony at nearby Lumsden on 1 November 2014. The trail begins in Kingston utilising old railway lines past Garston, Athol, Lumsden and Mossburn to then travels past the Mavora Lakes to end at Walter Peak.

== Wind Farm ==
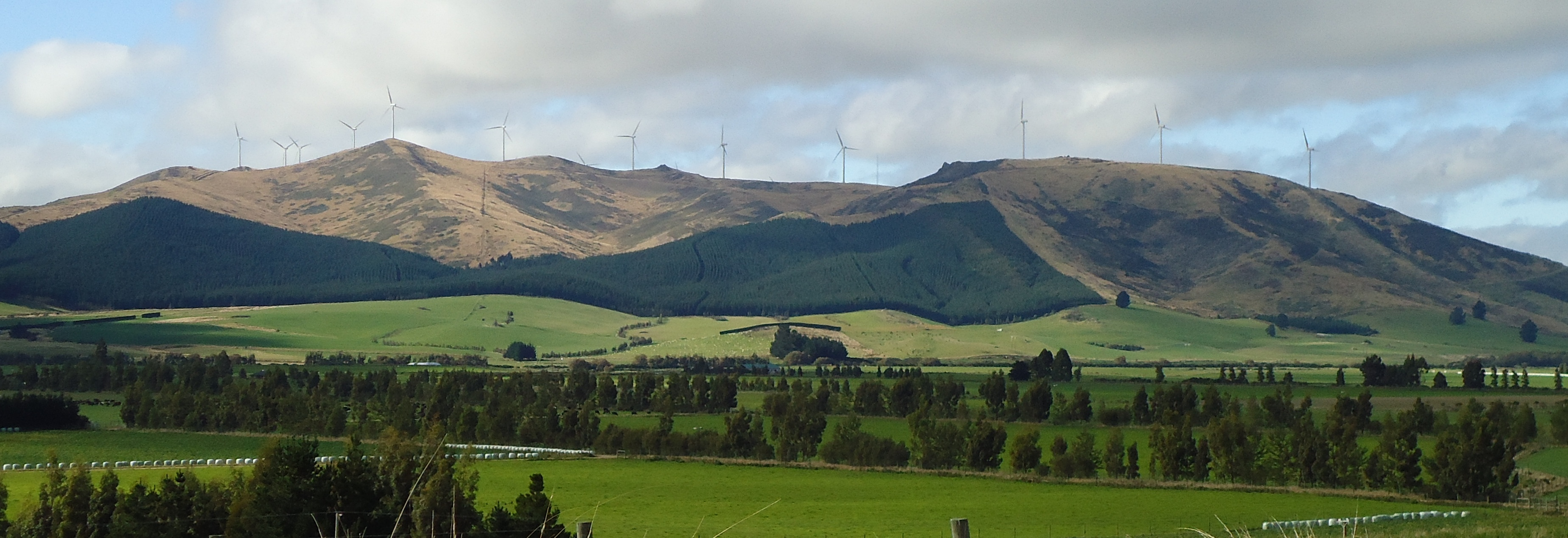
White Hill Wind Farm

During the later part of 2006 and early part of 2007, White Hill Wind Farm was constructed with 29 turbines each of 2.0 MW. In total, it can produce enough electricity to power 30,000 homes when at full capacity. This brought further local employment and financial benefits to the district. The wind farm was officially opened by the Prime Minister of New Zealand, Helen Clark, on 8 June 2007. This project has been greatly supported by the local community and created interest in New Zealand as an example of an alternative energy resource. Now yearly there is a mountain bike race through the wind farm, the White Hill Classic, that draws in mountain biking enthusiasts from the within region and around the country.

== Education ==
Mossburn School is a contributing primary school for years 1 to 6 with a roll of 55 as of July 2026. The school opened in 1887.
