= Festuca rubra subsp. commutata =

Chewings fescue

Scientific classification
- Kingdom: Plantae
- Clade: Tracheophytes
- Clade: Angiosperms
- Clade: Monocots
- Clade: Commelinids
- Order: Poales
- Family: Poaceae
- Subfamily: Pooideae
- Genus: Festuca
- Species: F. rubra
- Subspecies: F. r. subsp. commutata

Trinomial name
- Festuca rubra subsp. commutata Gaudin

Subspecies of flowering plant

Festuca rubra subsp. commutata, commonly known as Chewing's fescue, is a subspecies of grass. It is a perennial plant very common in lawns throughout Europe. The plant features filamentous leaves, with the leaf rolled in the shoot. It is a bunch grass.

== Cultivation ==
In a lawn, Chewing's fescue has a very high shoot density and fine appearance, high tolerance to low temperatures, and very good visual merit. It is tolerant of acidic soils, shows high shade tolerance (under light wear), very resistant to common turf diseases and requires minimal water and fertiliser.

These properties make it an ideal constituent in lawn turfs, where it is often found mixed with ryegrasses, smooth meadow-grass, red fescue and bent grasses. It is not particularly tolerant of heavy wear or very close mowing (<5mm), however.
