= Alameda, Texas =

Ghost town in Texas, US

- Ghost town
- Location within Texas
- Coordinates: 32.33402280°N 98.64644500°W
- Country: United States
- State: Texas
- County: Eastland

Alameda, formerly Mansker's Lake, is a ghost town in Eastland County, Texas, United States. Settled in 1857, it was called Mansker's Lake until a post office called Alameda—which ran from 1876 to 1882—was created. At its peak in 1860, it had an estimated population of 99. It was abandoned after 1936.
