= Turo's Hevi Gee =

Finnish band

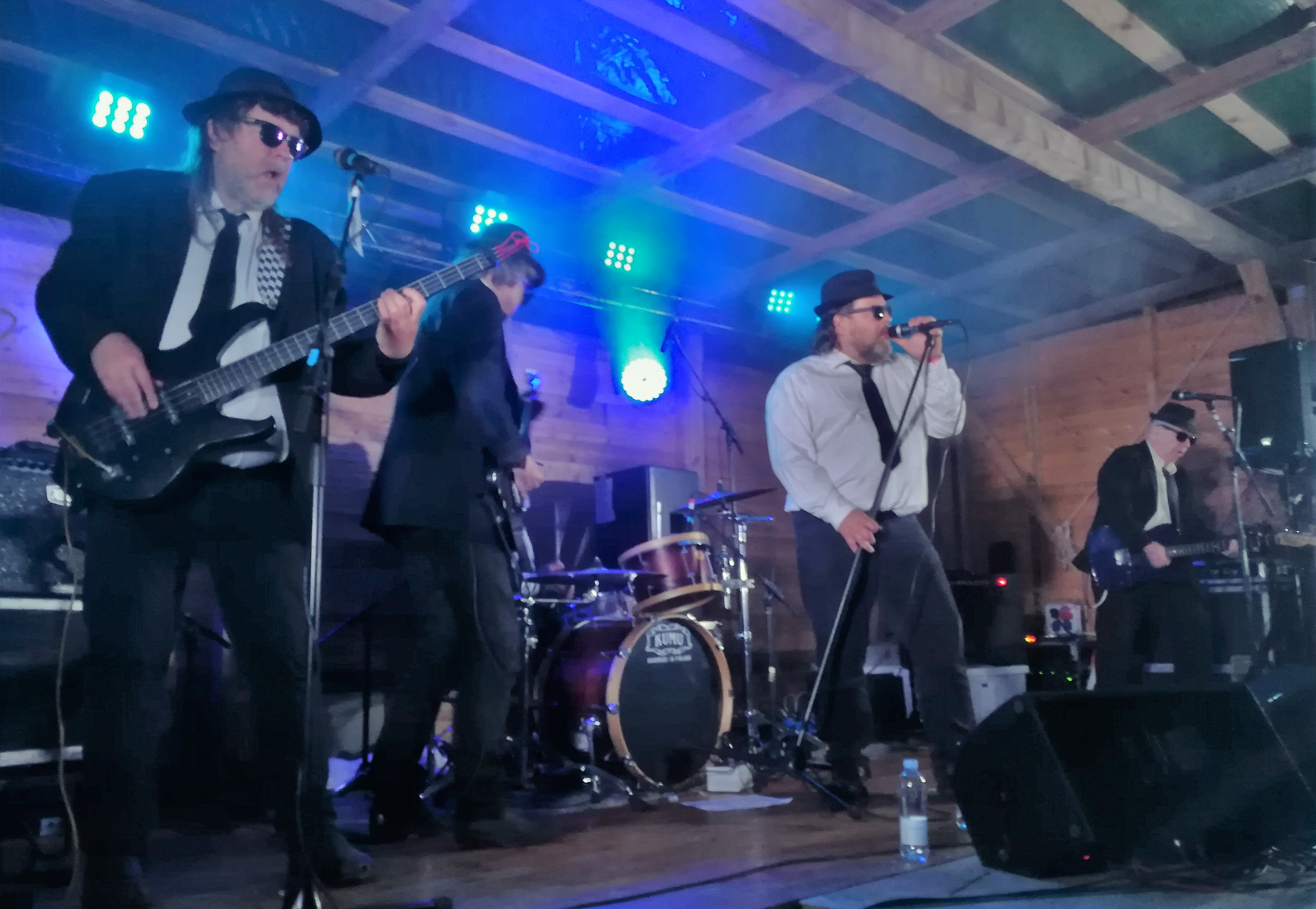

Background information
- Origin: Finland
- Years active: 1985–present

Turo's Hevi Gee is a Finnish humorous band from Lahti. Notable hits of the band include "Tampere", "Kyntäjän poika" and "Punaiset on silmät". The band celebrates an annual Turo day in Lahti on 8 July. The band is most famous for creating cover versions of Finnish and foreign hit singles, replacing the lyrics with more humorous ones.

The band was founded in 1985 and released their first album four years later. A 25th anniversary album was released in 2010. Their line-up as of 2014 included Ari Hukkanen, Pekka Heinänen, Ismo Karonen, Janne Piiroinen and Harri Kinnunen.

== Discography ==
- Santapaperia (1989)
- Rankimmat joululaulut (1989)
- Elämää suurempi äänilevy (1990)
- Tuleva keräilyharvinaisuus (1991)
- Putket mutkalla (1995)
- Ei se mitn! (1999)
- Mitäs tilasit!! (2000)
- Live! No Sleep 'til Pitkämäki (2001)
- Rock'n'rollia G-Pisteestä (2003)
- Lahest! (2006)
- Turo's Hevi Gee (2007)
