= John Grenell =

New Zealand singer-songwriter (1944–2022)

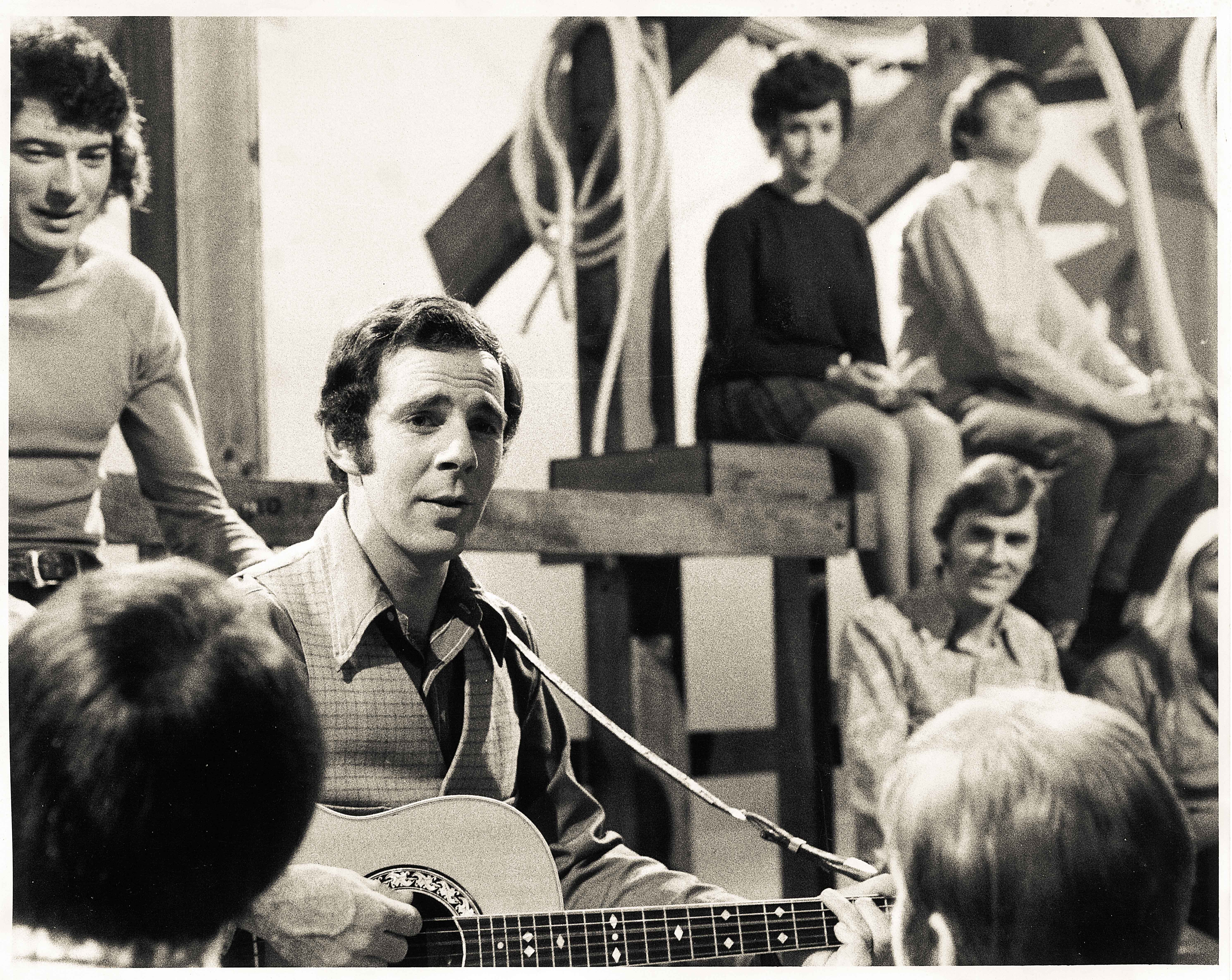
- Grenell in the early 1970s

Background information
- Birth name: John Denver Grenell
- Born: 19 July 1944; Ranfurly, New Zealand
- Died: 27 July 2022 (aged 78); Darfield, New Zealand
- Occupations: Country singer, songwriter
- Years active: 1962–2022

John Denver Hore (né Grenell) (19 July 1944 – 27 July 2022), better known by his stage name of John Grenell, was a New Zealand country singer and songwriter.

== Career ==
Grenell had his first professional engagement in 1962, the year he finished high school, after placing third in a nationwide TV contest "Have a Shot". He originally sang as John Hore, his stepfather's surname, but later changed to the family surname of Grenell. He recorded his first record album for Joe Brown in 1963, and made a further 16 albums between 1963 and 1974, some of which reached gold. He was the New Zealand representative to the Grand Ole Opry in Nashville, Tennessee in 1966 and 1974. He sang in America, Australia, Canada, England, and South Africa, and at various TV series, special events and a Royal Command performance. He wrote the New Zealand version of "I've Been Everywhere" with local place names in 1966.

He returned to entertainment in 1989–90 with the album "Welcome to our World" which was a single (a cover of Welcome to My World) and album best-seller in February 1990, see List of number-one singles. He received Country music recording industry awards, Male Vocalist of the year, a Gold Tribute award plus Best Country single and Country Record of the year. In 1990 he received a Scroll of Honour from the Variety Artists Club of New Zealand for his contribution to New Zealand entertainment.

== Personal life ==
Born in Ranfurly, Grenell grew up in Central Otago and Dunedin, and was educated at Kyeburn School and Otago Boys' High School. During his early years, he worked as a farmhand on the Glenrown farm in Kyeburn that was, and still is today, owned by the Greer Family. Later in 1971 He married Deidre Bruton; they had three sons and a daughter, all of whom are musical. Daughter Amiria won a NZ Music Award for Best Folk Album of the year in 2012 for her album Three Feathers. They lived in Whitecliffs, on a Canterbury foothills farm, and bred Appaloosa horses. He was interested in the outdoor environment, particularly high country tussock and watershed areas.

== Discography ==
- Introducing John Hore (Joe Brown, 1964)
- Encore (Joe Brown, 1965)
- My World (Joe Brown, 1965)
- Together (Joe Brown, 1966)
- Country Gentleman (Joe Brown, 1966)
- The Town & Country Sound Of John Hore U.S.A. (Joe Brown, 1966)
- Hit The Trail (Joe Brown, 1966)
- Take Ten (Joe Brown, 1967)
- My Kind Of Songs (Joe Brown, 1967)
- Country Style (Joe Brown, 1968)
- New Zealand Songs (Joe Brown, 1968)
- Sings Great Country Hits (Joe Brown, 1969)
- Great Country Songs By John Hore (Joe Brown, 1969)
- We Should Be Together (Joe Brown, 1972)
- Travellin' Singin' Man (Joe Brown, 1972)
- The Mountains Of Home (Joe Brown, 1973)
- Silver (Ode Records, 1988)
- Born In The West (Playa Sound, 1990)
- Welcome To Our World (CBS, 1990)
- Windstar - Aotearoa (Manu, 1991)
