= Waitaha =

Waitaha may refer to:

- Waitaha (Bay of Plenty iwi), a Māori tribe of the Bay of Plenty region of New Zealand
- Waitaha (South Island iwi), a historic Māori tribe of the South Island of New Zealand
- Waitaha penguin (Megadyptes waitaha), an extinct species of penguin
- Waitaha, the Māori name for the Canterbury Region of the South Island of New Zealand
- Waitaha River, a river in New Zealand's South Island
