= Waimea =

Waimea is a common place name in Hawaii and New Zealand. In Hawaiian, it means reddish water; in Māori it means forgotten or hidden stream. It may refer to:

== Geographic features and towns ==
=== Hawaii, United States ===
- Waimea, Hawaiʻi County, Hawaii, (Big Island; post office name "Kamuela")
  - Waimea–Kohala Airport, Hawaiʻi County
- Waimea, Kauaʻi County, Hawaii
- Waimea Bay, Oʻahu
- Waimea Canyon State Park, Kauaʻi
- Waimea Ditch, Kauaʻi
- Waimea River (Kauaʻi)
- Waimea River (Oʻahu)
- Waimea Valley, Oʻahu

=== New Zealand ===
- Waimea Inlet, Tasman Bay
- Waimea Plain (Southland)
- Waimea Plains (Tasman)
  - Waimea (electorate), historic electorate
  - Waimea-Picton, historic electorate
  - Waimea-Sounds (electorate), historic electorate
  - Waimea County, historic local government authority
- Waimea River (Southland)
- Waimea River (Tasman)

== Schools ==
- Waimea College, Richmond, Tasman, New Zealand
- Waimea High School, Kauaʻi, Hawaii
- Waimea Intermediate, Richmond, Tasman, New Zealand

== Flora and fauna ==
- Perrottetia sandwicensis (common name waimea or olomea), a shrub in the genus Perrottetia native to Hawaii
- Waimea pipturus, a Hawaiian flowering nettle
- Waimea phyllostegia, a Hawaiian species of mint

== Other ==
- Archdeacon of Waimea, an ecclesiastical post in New Zealand
- Waimea House, a historic residence in Woollahra, New South Wales, Australia
- Waimea Plains Railway, Southland, New Zealand
