= Pukaki =

Pukaki may refer to:

- Australasian swamphen, a bird commonly known as the pukeko in New Zealand
- Lake Pukaki, a lake in Canterbury, New Zealand
- HMNZS Pukaki, the name used by three ships of the Royal New Zealand Navy
- Pūkaki Lagoon, a volcano in Mangere, Auckland
- Pukaki River, a river in Canterbury
