= Renner, Dallas =

Human settlement in Texas, United States

Coordinates: 32.991°N 96.768°W

Renner is a section of Dallas, Texas, United States, within southwestern Collin County and southeastern Denton County, that was once a distinct rural community of approximately 10 square miles and housed the center of a nonprofit agricultural research organization.

Renner is within the North Central Division of the Dallas Police Department, which is headquartered at 6969 McCallum Boulevard.

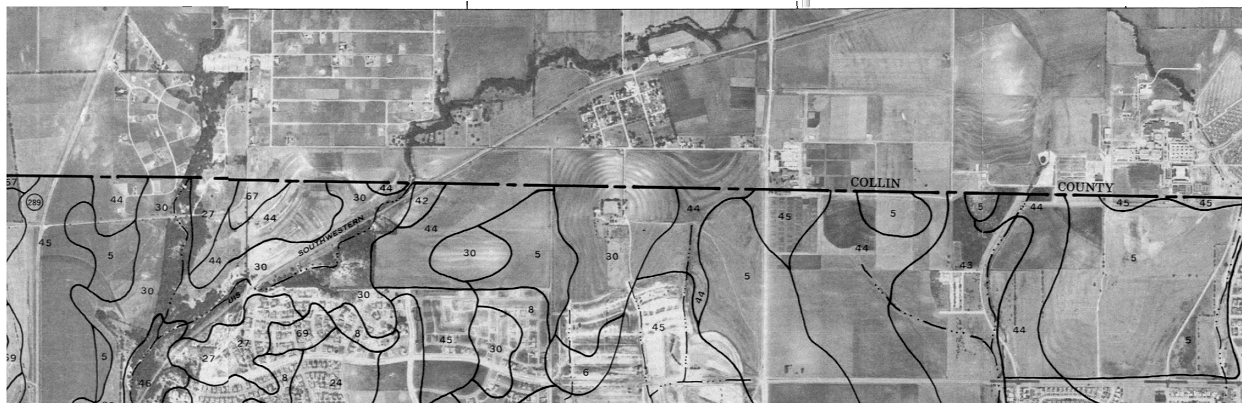
Aerial Photographs of Renner Town Center c 1975

== History ==
The namesake of the community, John A. Renner, developed townsites along the Cotton Belt line. A post office appeared in 1888. Coincidentally, the postmaster of Collin County in 1888 was George Renner. (DMN July 14, 1888). Renner received a telephone service in 1898 (DMN July 25, 1898). Renner was incorporated as a town in 1954 and annexed to Dallas in 1977.

Although the main residential portion of Renner mostly comprised a small triangle between McCallum (Wells) Blvd and the St. Louis Southwestern Railway, the agricultural portions of Renner extended North to Plano and East to include the agricultural research station, which is now a campus of the University of Texas at Dallas. The town also had a small bit of territory on the south side of McCallum Blvd. Land as far west as Josey Lane was within the corporate boundaries of Renner. Before absorption into Dallas, Renner had platted some of the agricultural portions for housing development.

The City of Dallas had plans to revitalize the area and use the existing freight line for a light rail but community pressure caused them to drop the "Renner Village" stop from the proposal.

AT&T's Renner switch includes several exchanges that now serve North Dallas but that once served the community of Renner. For example, the current "733" exchange was originally "Renner 3" or simply "RE3."

== Annexation ==
The disparity between Collin County and Dallas County services was apparent as early as 1940 (DMN 04-14-1940)and annexation to Dallas was also considered at that time (DMN 09-03-1941), it was not until the 1970s where insufficient water infrastructure and budget shortages that required the laying off most of small police force became a serious issue for the Town of Renner. By 1976 the Texas Department of Health declared Renner's municipal drinking water to be non-drinkable and the police force was eliminated due to budget cuts. Over 50% of the people living in Renner had signed a petition to be annexed into Dallas. In 1971 there were plans to merge the town with Richardson, but Renner would later accede to Dallas in 1977. The final mayor, Harvey Miles was elected through a final election in which both he and his opponent received 77 votes each (DMN, Jan 20, 1977). One of Miles' last actions appears to have been to allow some residents to annex nonessential portions of the street to their properties. Miles handed the keys to the Renner town hall to Dallas City Manager George Schrader on April 4, 1977 (DMN, April 5, 1977) After this, the city of Dallas began annexing Renner and by 1983 had completed the process. Over 50% of the people living in Renner had signed a petition to be annexed into Dallas. In April 1977 Dallas voters approved of the annexation on a 16,500 to 10,039 basis.

A total of 36 streets, including streets in the recently platted fields, and streets that have since been developed over, were renamed so as not to duplicate street names of Dallas proper (DMN, July 8, 1977). "Frank Jackson" and "Dickerson" are named after F.W. Jackson and J.B. Dickerson, patriarchs of prominent settler families who appear frequently in the society pages of the Dallas Morning News from the early 1900s. First and Second Streets became "Ronnie" and "Newt" after Ronald and Newton Hartline and a third street was bulldozed to expand McCallum Blvd, formerly known as Wells. Some members of the Coit and Campbell families also lived in the community.

Colorful mayor Ronald Newton Hartline (1937-1976), who was no-billed by Dallas County for official misconduct and theft by conversion (including borrowing a police CB radio to avoid speed traps) (DMN 03-23-1976), was killed in 1976 by a shotgun to the chest by Sam McDonald in Bonham, TX after a dispute over land on December 13, 1976 . Hartline was a son of the town and his father Newt(on) "Lucky" Hartline (1887-1978) once served as mayor in the past.

== Governance ==
Before annexation to Dallas, the following people served as mayors

- J.T. Wells - 1954
- D.E. Wilson - 1957-1960
- Newton Lucky Hartline
- John T. McCool - c1964-1971
- Connie Armstrong - 1971-1975
- Ronald Lloyd Hartline - 1975-1976
- Harvey Miles - 1976-1977

(DMN 04-04-1971)

== Education ==
Sections of Renner are within the Plano Independent School District, Richardson Independent School District, and Carrollton-Farmers Branch Independent School District.

By the time of annexation, there were no schools in Renner. A school was established in Renner on the corner of Coit and Renner Roads in 1888 but closed 31 years later. It was relocated to the Historical Park in Downtown Dallas.

Dallas Public Library operates the Renner Frankford Branch Library.

== Frankfort/Frankford ==
The corporate boundaries of Renner included the former site of the town of Frankford. Here is what the handbook of Texas has to say about Frankford.

FRANKFORD, TEXAS. Frankford was nine miles northwest of Richardson in extreme southwestern Collin County. Settlement of the area began around a campsite on the Shawnee Trail near a small spring on Halls Branch, used in the 1850s and 1860s as a stopping point and watering hole for traildrivers and other travelers. A small town developed after the Civil War at the nearby crossing of Addison and Weber Road(now Hilton Head Road), and a post office opened on May 11, 1880, under the name Frankford. By 1890 the town had a population of eighty-three, a steam gristmill, a corn mill, a cotton gin, a blacksmith shop, two general stores, and three churches. The St. Louis Southwestern Railway bypassed the town in the late 1880s, however, and many Frankford residents moved to Addison, Plano, and other nearby communities. In 1904 the Frankford post office was closed, and in 1907 its lodge hall, which had served as a nondenominational church, was moved to Addison. A second church, built in the 1890s, continued to serve a predominantly Methodist congregation until 1924. By the mid-1930s the town was no longer shown on county highway maps. Its church building was restored in 1963 by the Frankford Cemetery Association, which arranged for the Episcopal Church of the Holy Communion to worship there. The city of Dallas annexed the area in 1975, and in 1990 local children attended the Plano schools. All that remained of the community in 1990 was the Frankford Church and Cemetery, adjoined by residences on three sides and by the Bent Tree Country Club to the south.

Frankford was originally called Draketown. (DMN 01-09-1929) In 1886 the name was changed from Pauline to Frankford.)
