= William James Mildenhall =

Australian civil servant and photographer

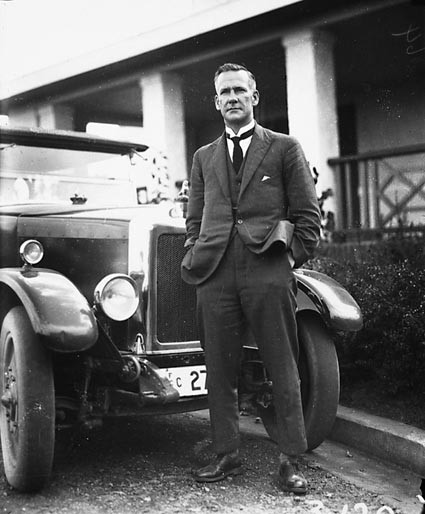
Royal Visit, May 1927 - Mr Mildenhall with his Armstrong Siddley motor car Registration Number 27

William James "Jack" Mildenhall (1891–1962) photographed construction of the new Australian capital, Canberra, during its development in the 1920s and 1930s.

Mildenhall was a Commonwealth public servant, initially employed as paymaster in the Department of Works and Railways, he later became the Information Officer for the Federal Capital Commission in 1926.

Mildenhall had seen the need to officially document the growing national capital in photographs, and offered his services to the Department of Works & Railways in 1921; an offer which was readily accepted.

He often took photographs in his own time, and on an ad hoc basis alongside his full-time clerical position, continuing in this role until 1935, when complaints concerning his monopolisation of departmental photography resulted in an inquiry that forced the arrangement to be discontinued.

== Mildenhall photographic collection ==
The Mildenhall photographic collection in the National Library of Australia contains more than 7,700 photographic images on glass negatives of Canberra in the 1920s and 1930s. The photographs were taken by William James Mildenhall.

=== Some images from the collection ===
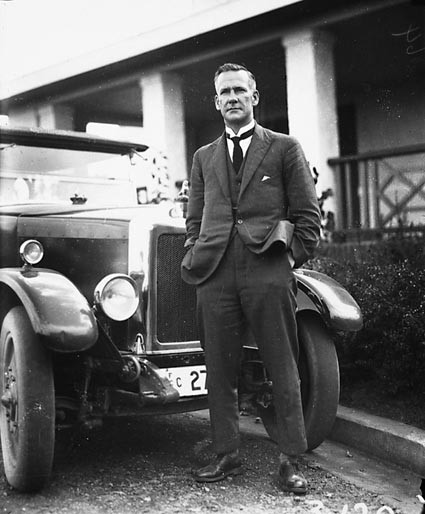
Mildenhall in 1927

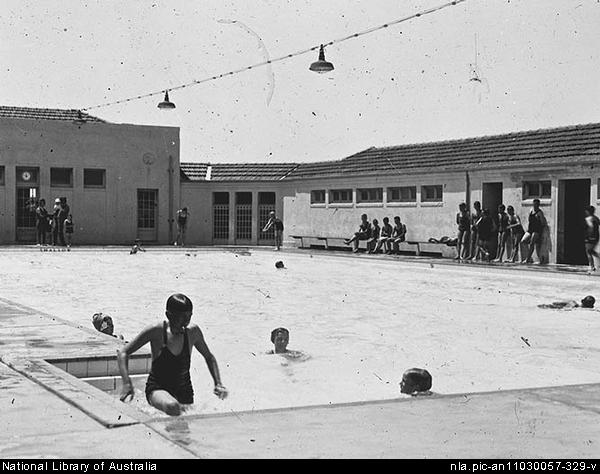
Manuka Pool

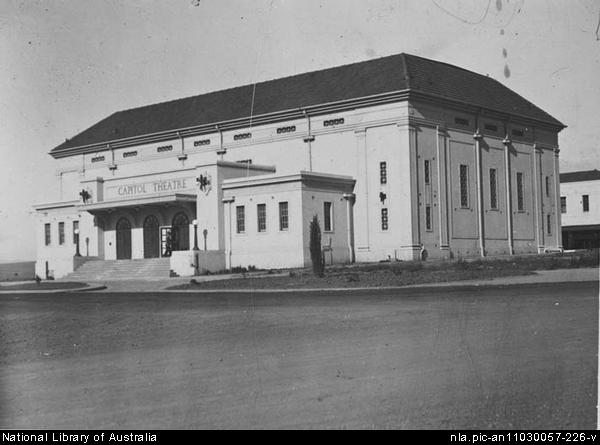
Capitol Theatre, Manuka

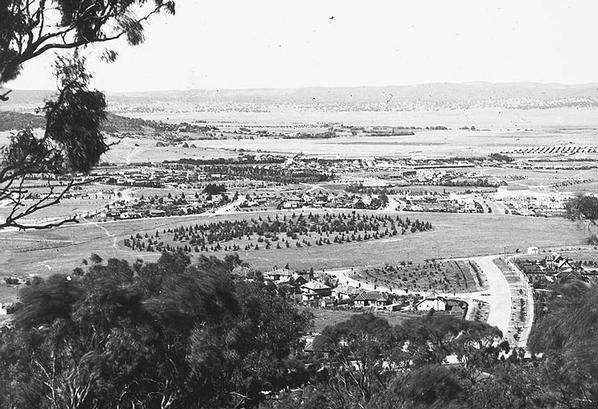
Collins Park and Eastlake

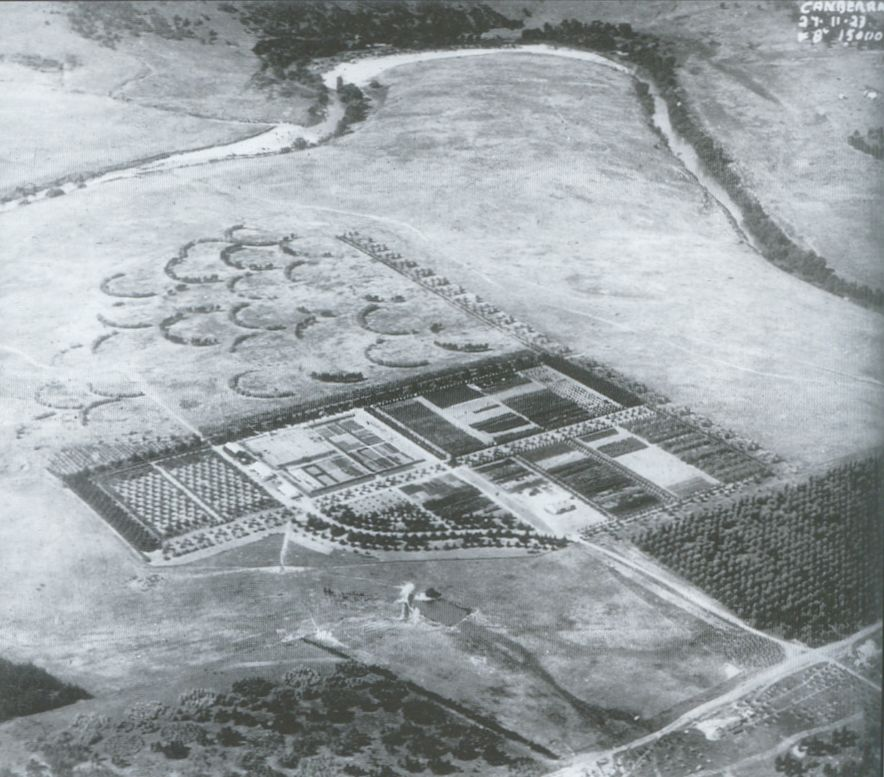
Yarralumla Nursery from the air in 1923

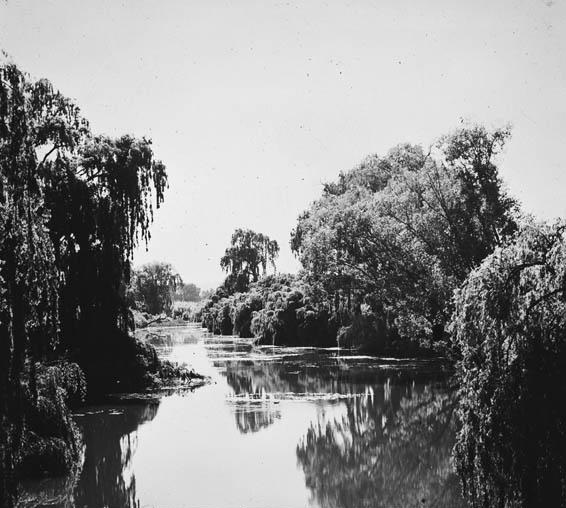
Molonglo River at Acton, 1920

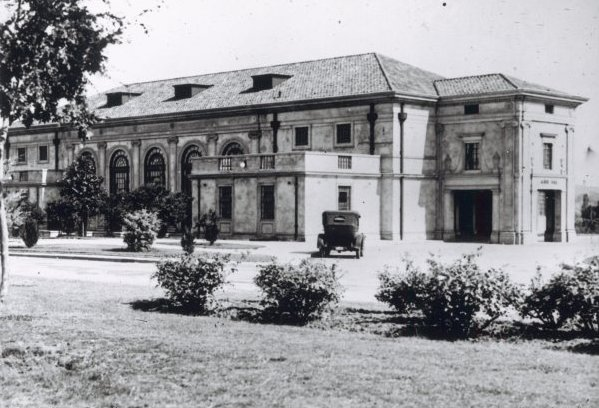
The Albert Hall about 1928
