= Southbourne =

Southbourne may refer to:

- Southbourne, Dorset, a suburb of Bournemouth
- Southbourne, West Sussex, a village in West Sussex
  - Southbourne (UK electoral ward)
  - Southbourne railway station, located in Southbourne, West Sussex
