= Geoff Mack =

Australian musician and aircraft mechanic (1922–2017)

Geoff Mack OAM
- Born: Albert Geoffrey McElhinney; 20 December 1922; Surrey Hills, Victoria, Australia
- Died: 21 July 2017 (aged 94) Gold Coast, Queensland, Australia
- Genre: Country
- Occupations: Singer; songwriter; aircraft mechanic
- Instruments: Vocals, guitar
- Years active: 1944–2017
- Website: geoffmack.250x.com

Albert Geoffrey McElhinney OAM (20 December 1922 – 21 July 2017), better known by his stage name Geoff Mack, was an Australian country singer, songwriter and aircraft mechanic. As a songwriter, he wrote the song "I've Been Everywhere" which was an Australian hit for Lucky Starr in April 1962 and became popular in North America when adapted for Hank Snow in November. More than 130 cover versions have been recorded.

In 2008, Mack was inducted into the Australian Roll of Renown.

== Biography ==
Mack was born on 20 December 1922 in Surrey Hills, a suburb of Melbourne. His father was William Arthur Henry McElhinney, and his mother was Ethel Mary (née Park).

Mack's musical career was established during World War II, he enlisted on 4 June 1942 in the RAAF, and was trained as an aircraft mechanic; he was discharged on 7 January 1946 with the rank of corporal from 62 ACW (Airfield Construct Wing). In 1944 whilst serving in Borneo, his ability to play the guitar and sing was noticed, and he was seconded to entertain the troops with visiting guest stars. In May 1946, Mack was an ex-serviceman performer on a theatre concert, who "was responsible for most of the laughs with his vocal gymnastics, his number, 'In Der Fuhrer's Face', being a gem of its kind, which had the audience in hysterics."

At the end of the war, Mack went to Japan with the Occupation Forces to perform, and was appointed to Radio WLKS as the voice of the British Commonwealth Occupation Forces. In August 1950, he returned to Australia after performing for British, American, French, German, and Japanese audiences, including his rendition of "Waltzing Matilda".

His 1959 song, "I've Been Everywhere", became a hit in Australia in 1962 with the release of a cover version by Lucky Starr. It later reached the top of the song charts in the United States, Germany, and Japan. The song has now been recorded in 131 different versions, notably on Johnny Cash's 1996 album Unchained.

== Honours ==
Mack was inducted into the Songwriters Hall of Fame in Nashville in 1963.

He was awarded the Medal of the Order of Australia in 2005 for his service to country music, and his support of community and senior citizens' groups .

=== Australian Roll of Renown ===
The Australian Roll of Renown honours Australian and New Zealander musicians who have shaped the music industry by making a significant and lasting contribution to Country Music. It was inaugurated in 1976 and the inductee is announced at the Country Music Awards of Australia in Tamworth in January.

Year	Nominee / work	Award	Result
2008	Geoff Mack	Australian Roll of Renown	inductee

=== CMAA Awards ===
These annual awards have been presented since 1973 and have been organised by Country Music Association of Australia (CMAA) from 1993, to "encourage, promote and recognise excellence in Australian country music recording". From that time the recipient's trophy has been a Golden Guitar.

Year	Nominee / work	Award	Result
1978	Geoff Mack	Hands of Fame	imprinted
2013	Geoff Mack	Lifetime Achievement	awarded

=== Mo Awards ===
The Australian Entertainment Mo Awards (commonly known informally as the Mo Awards), were annual Australian entertainment industry awards. They recognise achievements in live entertainment in Australia from 1975 to 2016. Geoff Mack won two awards in that time.

Year	Nominee / work	Award	Result (wins only)
1994	Geoff Mack	John Campbell Fellowship Award	Won
2012	Geoff Mack	Hall of Fame	inducted

=== Tamworth Songwriters Awards ===
The Tamworth Songwriters Association (TSA) is an annual songwriting contest for original country songs, awarded in January at the Tamworth Country Music Festival. They commenced in 1986.

Year	Nominee / work	Award	Result (wins only)
1993	Geoff Mack	Tex Morton Award	awarded
