= 2008 New Year Honours (New Zealand) =

Annual awards for New Zealanders

- Previous: 2007 New Zealand gallantry awards Next: 2008 New Zealand bravery awards
- Type: New Zealand royal honours: Order of New Zealand; New Zealand Order of Merit; Queen's Service Order; Queen's Service Medal; New Zealand Antarctic Medal; New Zealand Distinguished Service Decoration
- Date: 31 December 2007
- Country: New Zealand
- Total recipients: 203

The 2008 New Year Honours in New Zealand were appointments by Elizabeth II in her right as Queen of New Zealand, on the advice of the New Zealand government, to various orders and honours to reward and highlight good works by New Zealanders, and to celebrate the passing of 2007 and the beginning of 2008. They were announced on 31 December 2007.

The recipients of honours are listed here as they were styled before their new honour.

== Order of New Zealand (ONZ) ==
Ordinary member

- The Right Honourable Donald Charles McKinnon – of London, United Kingdom.
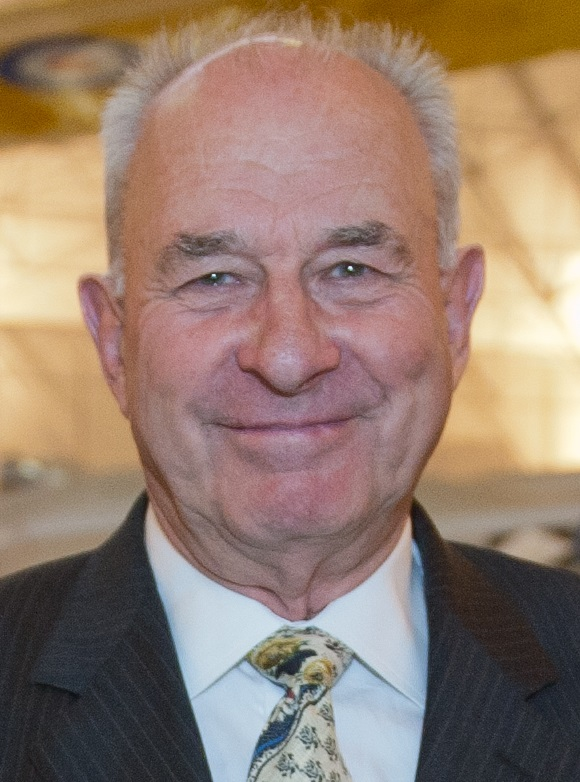
Don McKinnon

== New Zealand Order of Merit ==
=== Principal Companion (PCNZM) ===
- Dame Malvina Lorraine Major DBE – of Christchurch. For services to opera.
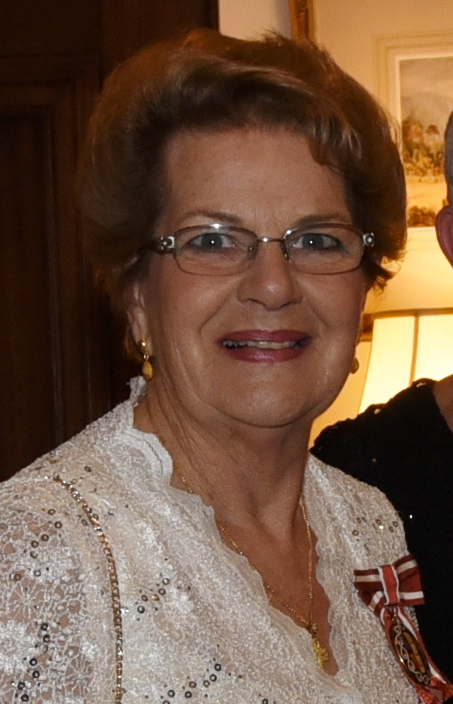
Dame Malvina Major

=== Distinguished Companion (DCNZM) ===
- The Honourable Edward Taihakurei Junior Durie – of Lower Hutt. For services to the Māori Land Court, Waitangi Tribunal and High Court of New Zealand.
- Professor Peter David Gluckman CNZM – of Auckland. For services to medicine.
- The Honourable Margaret Kerslake Shields QSO JP – of Pukerua Bay. For services to local-body affairs and women.
- Peter Graham Siddell QSO – of Auckland. For services to art.
- Kenneth Allen Stevens – of Auckland. For services to exporting.
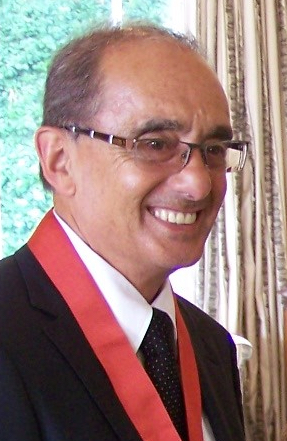
Eddie Durie

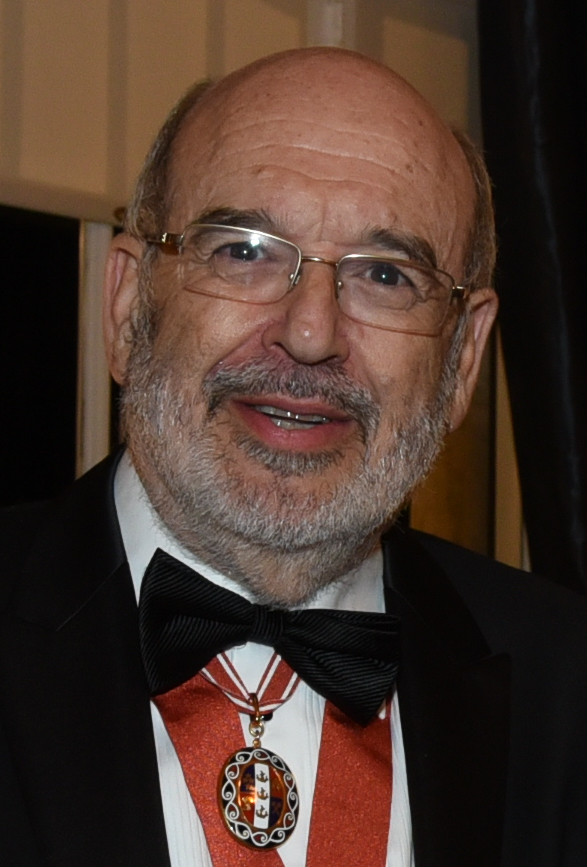
Peter Gluckman

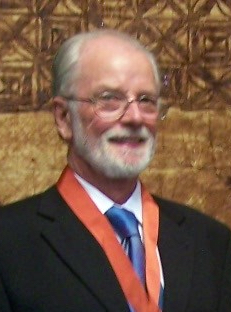
Peter Siddell

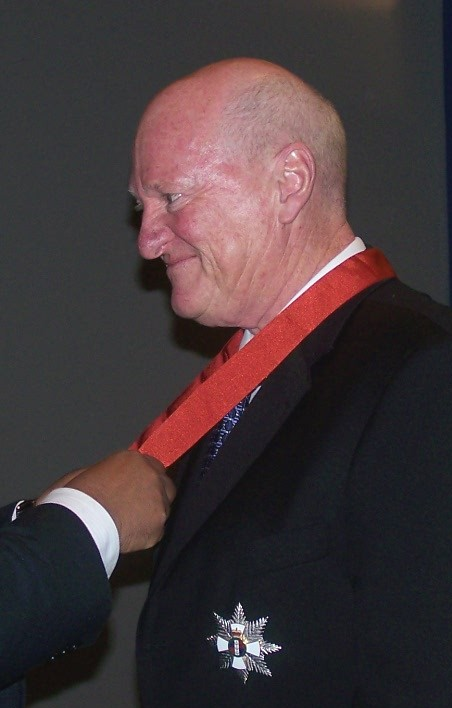
Ken Stevens

=== Companion (CNZM) ===
- The Honourable Margaret Elizabeth Austin MNZM – of Christchurch. For services to the community.
- Sydney Joseph Bradley MBE – of Christchurch. For services to business and the public health sector.
- Judith Murray Carter – of Palmerston North. For services to education.
- Professor Gary Richard Hawke – of Wellington. For services to education and economics.
- Robin Langford Kay – of Wellington. For services to art and military history.
- Guilford (Giff) Montgomerie-Davidson OBE JP – of Wellington. For services to business and the community.
- Garry Anthony Moore – of Christchurch. For services to local-body affairs.
- Professor Sylvia Vine Sheat Rumball ONZM – of Palmerston North. For services to science.
- George Edwin Tanner QC – of Lower Hutt. For services to the law, lately as chief parliamentary counsel.
- Professor Marilyn Joy Waring – of North Shore. For services to women and economics.
- George Sydney Wood – of North Shore. For services to local-body affairs.
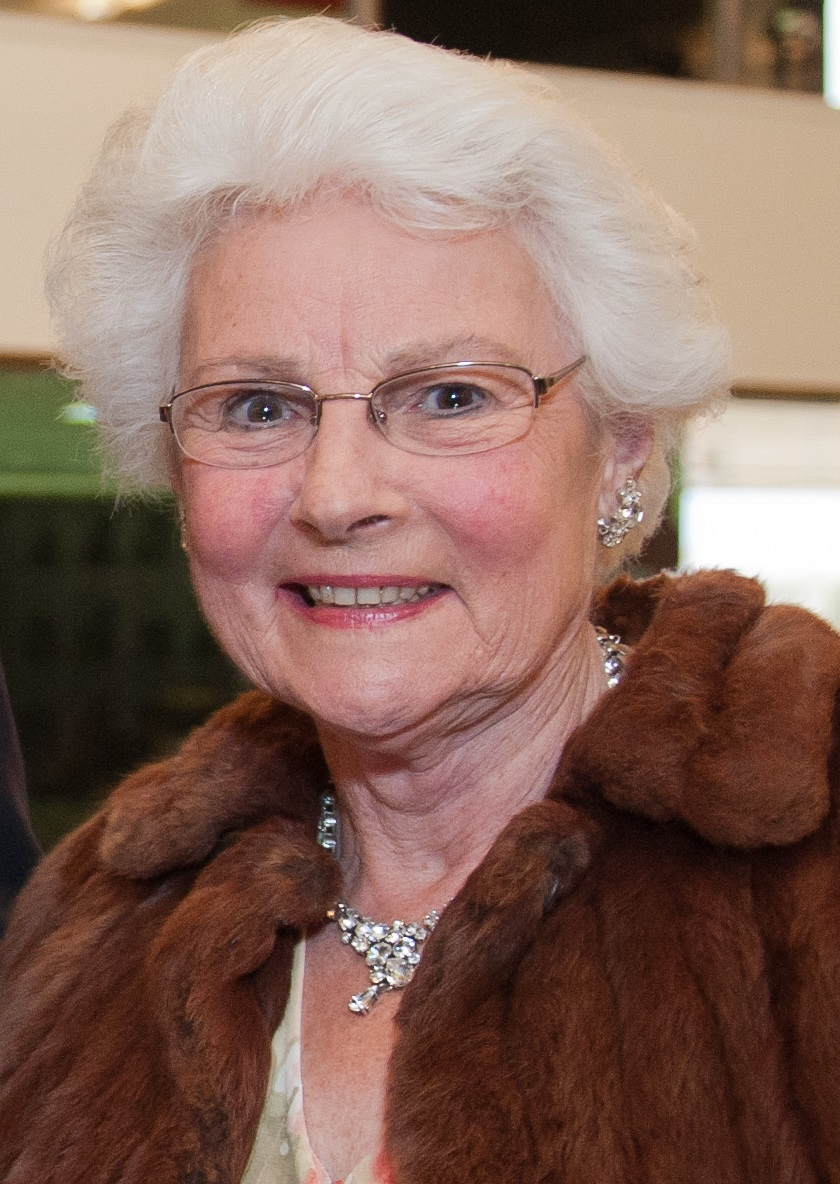
Margaret Austin

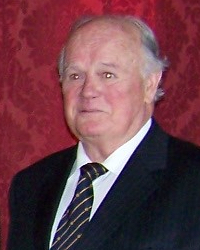
Giff Davidson

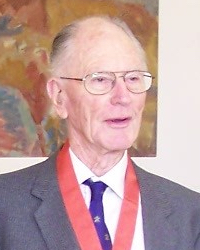
Robin Kay

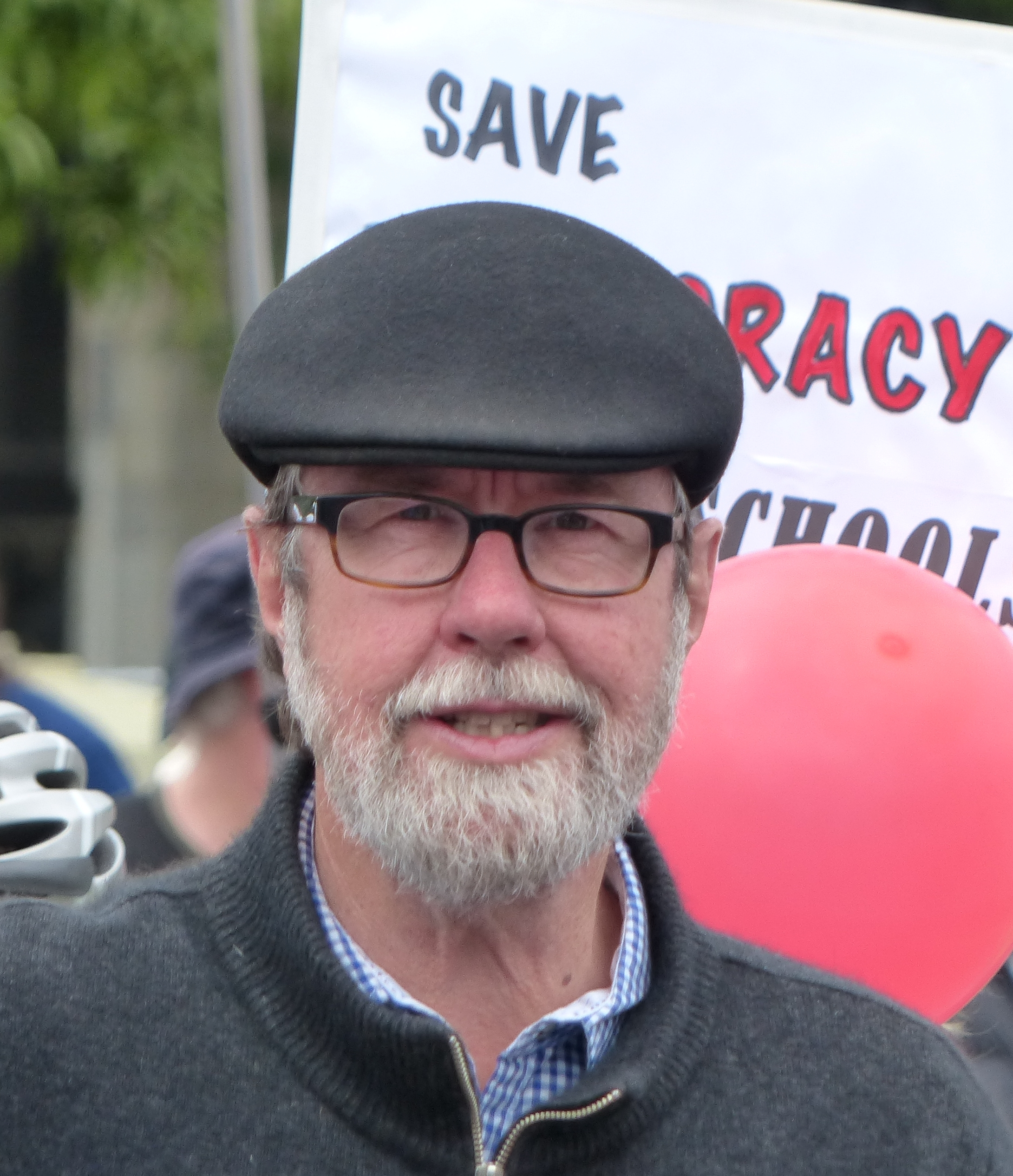
Garry Moore

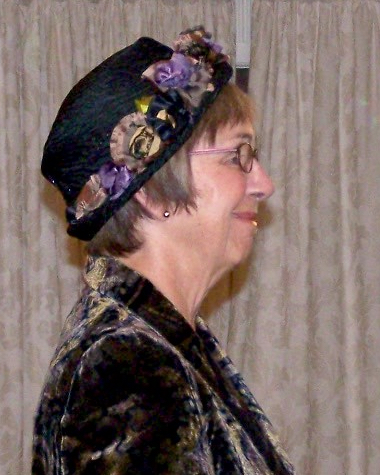
Sylvia Rumball

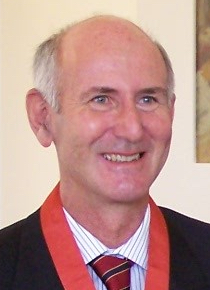
George Tanner

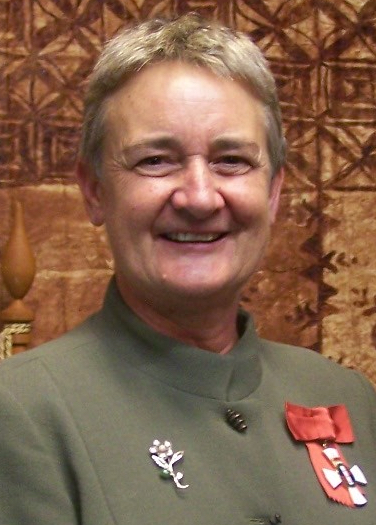
Marilyn Waring

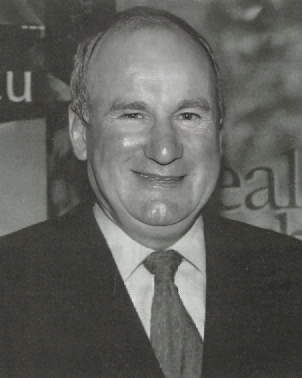
George Wood

=== Officer (ONZM) ===
- Associate Professor Harry Roger Allan Allen – of Manukau (South Auckland). For services to archaeology.
- Professor Chellaraj Satyadas Benjamin – of North Shore. For services to medicine and the community.
- Dr Graeme Herbert Campbell – of Waitakere (West Auckland). For services to conservation.
- Edwin Roy Davidson – of Auckland. For services to special education.
- John Nelson Duder – of North Shore. For services to engineering and the community.
- Professor Richard Laurence Earle – of Palmerston North. For services to engineering.
- Associate Professor Tagaloatele Peggy Fairbairn-Dunlop – of Wellington. For services to research on families.
- Michael Leopold Frohlich – of Tauranga. For services to the community.
- Judith Mildred deVisme Fyfe – of Wellington. For services to oral history and journalism.
- Dr Richard Pelham Garland – of Palmerston North. For services to chemistry and pharmaceuticals.
- Anthony Peter Gavin – of Wellington. For services to the Ministry of Social Development.
- Owen George Glenn – of Monaco. For services to business and the community.
- Christine Mary Hainstock – of Christchurch. For services to the arts and the community.
- Alan Graeme Hall – of Wellington. For services to people with disabilities and the community.
- Colin Manson Harvey – of North Shore. For services to business and animal health.
- Caroline Margaret Kellaway JP – of Christchurch. For services to the community.
- Dr John Ross (Harry) Keys – of Taupō. For services to conservation.
- Air Vice-Marshal Graham Brian Lintott – Chief of Air Force, Royal New Zealand Air Force.
- Dr Murray Joseph Angland McDonald – of Rotorua. For services to medicine.
- David Alexander McPhail QSM – of Christchurch. For services to television and the theatre.
- Gordon Desmond Moller – of Auckland. For services to architecture.
- Gordon Bryant Ogilvie – of Christchurch. For services to historical research.
- Shimrath Cherian Paul – of Dunedin. For services to museum administration.
- Victor Frederick Percival QSM JP – of Auckland. For services to New Zealand–China trade.
- Harry Lawrence McIntyre Smith ED – of Auckland. For services to medicine.
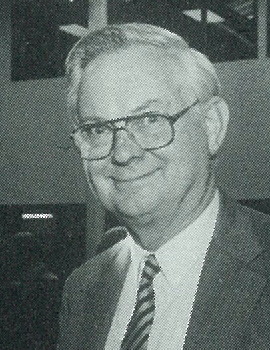
Dick Earle

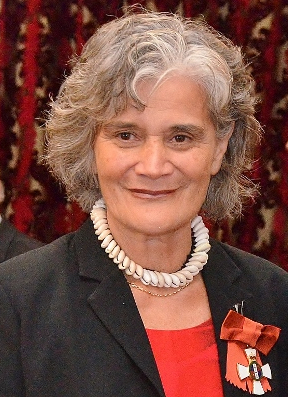
Peggy Fairbairn-Dunlop

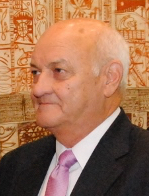
Owen Glenn

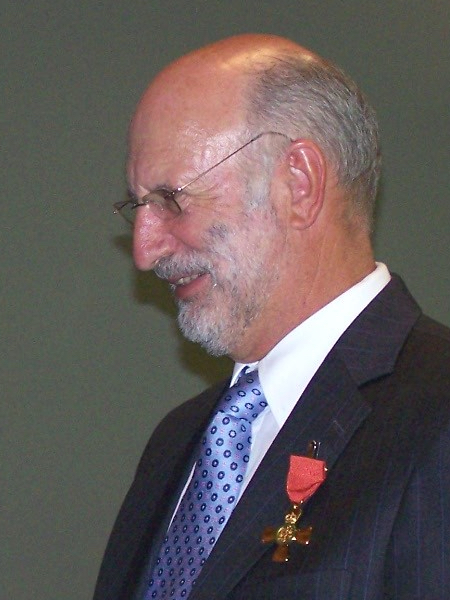
Colin Harvey

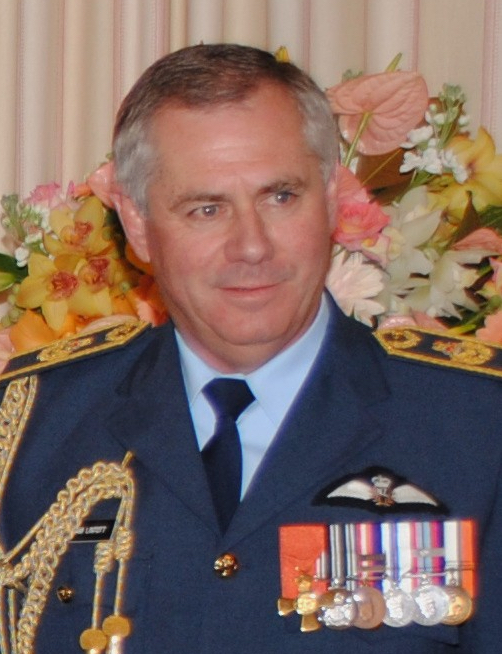
Graham Lintott

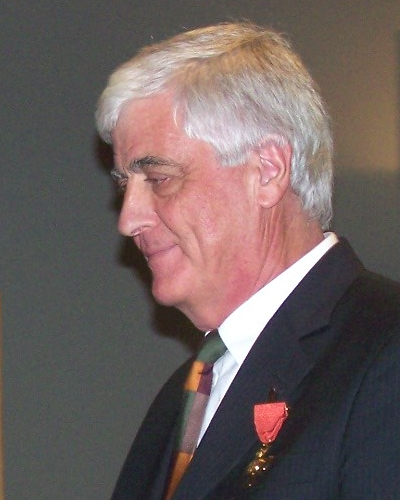
Gordon Moller

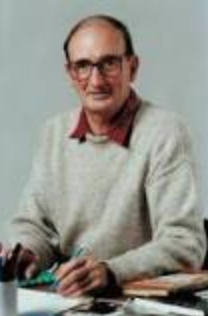
Gordon Ogilvie

=== Member (MNZM) ===
- Robert Kenneth Abbott – of Auckland; inspector, New Zealand Police. For services to the New Zealand Police.
- Rae Beverley Adlam – of Tauranga. For services to business.
- Hilary Margaret Allison – of Dunedin. For services to the community.
- Gillian Rosemary Ansell – of Wellington. For services to music.
- Mere Isabel Austin JP – of Auckland. For services to Māori.
- Ann Barbara Chapman JP – of Ōtaki. For services to local-body affairs and the community.
- Dr Sun Sung Chau – of North Shore. For services to medicine and the community.
- Ingrid Nea Collins – of Gisborne. For services to Māori.
- Louise Marjorie Croot – of Dunedin. For services to health and the community.
- William (Bill) Franklin Culbert – of London, United Kingdom. For services to art, in particular sculpture.
- Sherrill Mary Dackers – of Opononi. For services to women.
- Stuart Forbes Devenie – of Auckland. For services to entertainment.
- John Lockett Devlin – of Corrimal, New South Wales, Australia. For services to entertainment.
- Jane Lu-cretia du Feu JP – of Nelson. For services to Māori.
- Jannet Kathleen Dunstall – of Christchurch. For services to penal reform.
- Kevin Barry Fallon – of Auckland. For services to soccer.
- Michael Garry Farnworth – of Tauranga. For services to the New Zealand Customs Service.
- Alison Rachel Fitch – of Hamilton. For services to swimming.
- Air Commodore Terence Michael Gardiner – Royal New Zealand Air Force.
- James Alexander Gibbs – of Matamata. For services to the racing industry.
- Barbara Ann Greer JP – of Hokitika. For services to health and Māori.
- Mary Ray Hammond – of Porirua. For services to Māori health.
- Owen Jerry Hapuku – of Havelock North. For services to Māori.
- Clifford Ernest Hughes – of Tauranga. For services to woodchopping.
- Brian Robert Jeffares JP – of Stratford. For services to local-body affairs and the community.
- Robert Hugh Merrell Johnston – of Oxford. For services to farming, local-body affairs and the community.
- Arthur Jacob Klap – of Wellington. For services to sport and recreation.
- Ross James Lawson – of Blenheim. For services to the wine industry and the community.
- Sally Gillian Mackay – of Blenheim. For services to education and the community.
- Robert George Martin – of Whanganui. For services to people with disabilities.
- Mabel Victoria McClelland – of Christchurch. For services to wildlife.
- Roger Munro McNaughton – of Invercargill. For services to conservation.
- David John Murphy – of Alexandra. For services to conservation.
- Guinevere Eti Eves Newport JP – of Christchurch. For services to the Pacific Islands community.
- Reremoana Tuakana Mate Ngata – of Tikitiki. For services to Māori and the community.
- Wahineiti Ruth Te Kawa Tapu A Rangi Norman JP – of North Shore. For services to the community.
- James Leonard Peters – of Kaikohe. For services to local-body affairs, education and the community.
- Mohammed Sahil – of Waitakere. For services to business and the community.
- Glenda May Saunders – of Hamilton. For services to the community.
- Trevor Donald Scott – of Dunedin. For services to business and the community.
- Yvonne Lesley Sharp – of Kerikeri. For services to local-body affairs and the community.
- Stephen John Stehlin – of Auckland. For services to Pacific Island television broadcasting and the arts.
- Annah Rae Stretton – of Morrinsville. For services to business, fashion and the community.
- The Reverend 'Epeli Taungapeau – of Manukau. For services to the Tongan community.
- John Douglas Tenquist – of Featherston. For services to senior citizens and the community.
- Dr Heather Thomson – of Invercargill. For services to medicine and the community.
- Mahinārangi Tocker – of Waitakere. For services to music.
- John Kieran Turton – of Ashburton. For services to business.
- Dr Rosamund Vallings – of Papakura. For services to people with chronic fatigue syndrome.
- Edward Kereminita Waaka JP – of Napier. For services to Māori, education and the community.
- Marianne Robyn Whittington – of Auckland. For services to nursing.
- Glenys Rae Wood – of Hamilton. For services to women and health.
- Raymond Frederick Woolf – of Kaitaia. For services to entertainment.
- William Walsh Wrightson – of Porirua. For services to people with disabilities.

Additional

- Graeme Russell Cairns – of Christchurch, superintendent, New Zealand Police. For services to the New Zealand Police.
- Able Combat Systems Specialist Rene Hamuera Rangi – Royal New Zealand Navy.

Honorary

- Professor Yasushi Muraki – of Kobe, Japan. For services to astrophysics.
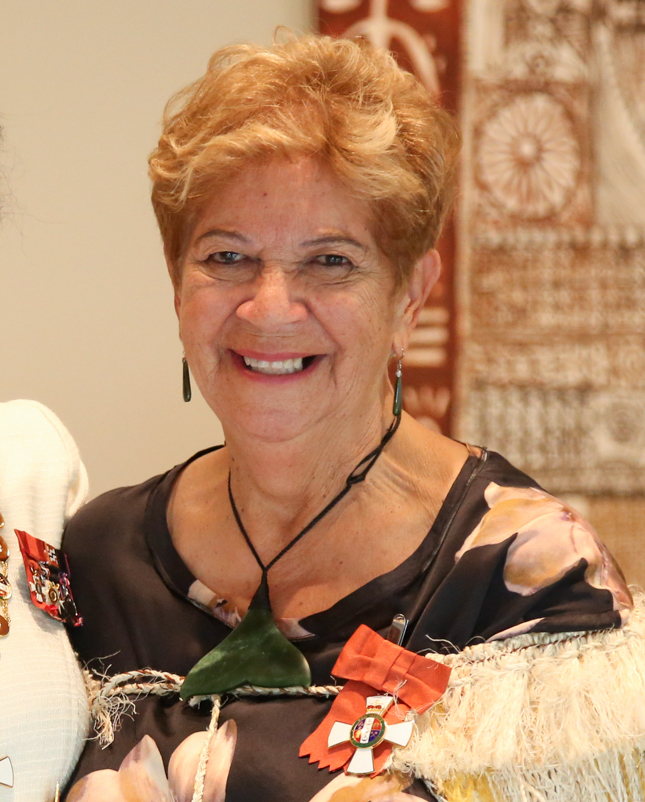
Ingrid Collins

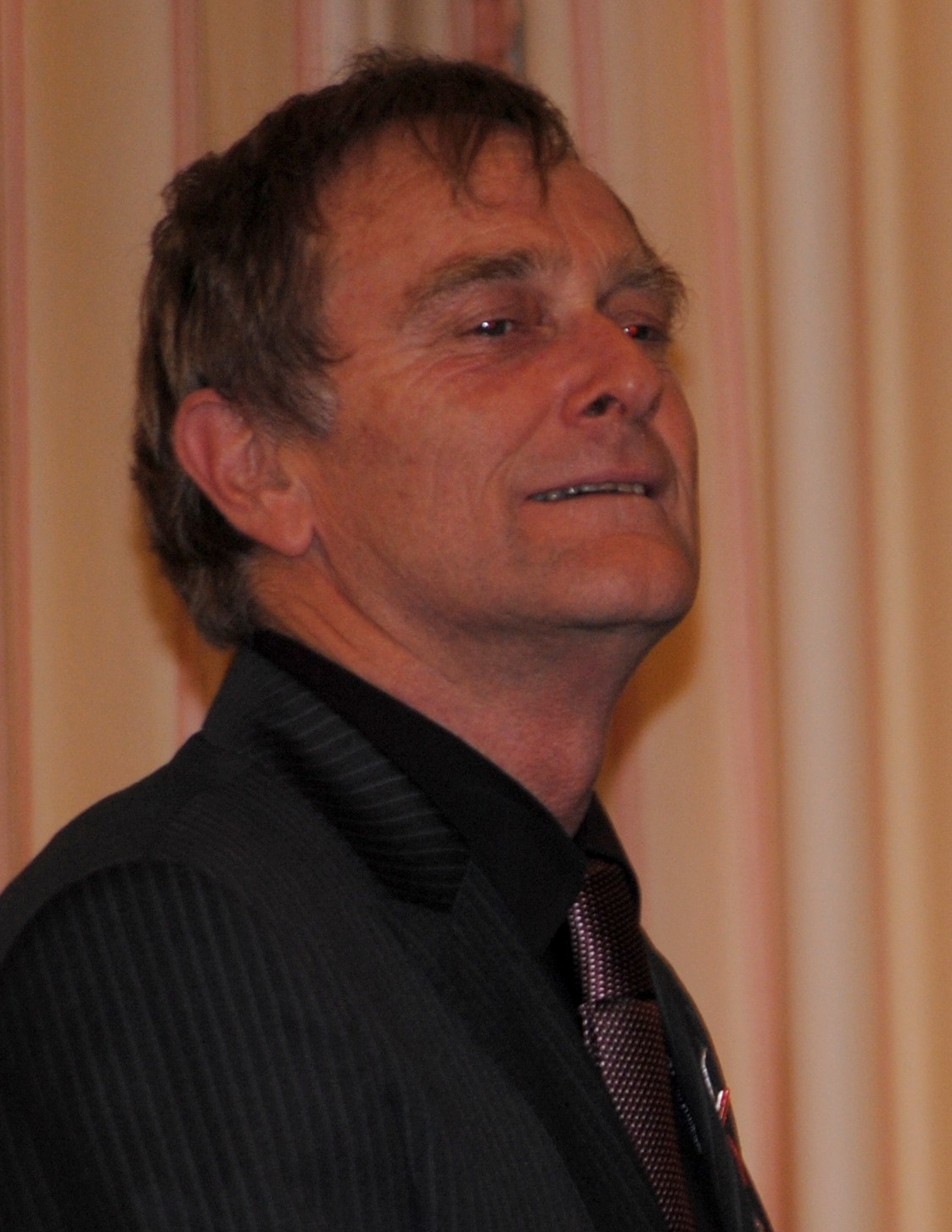
Stuart Devenie

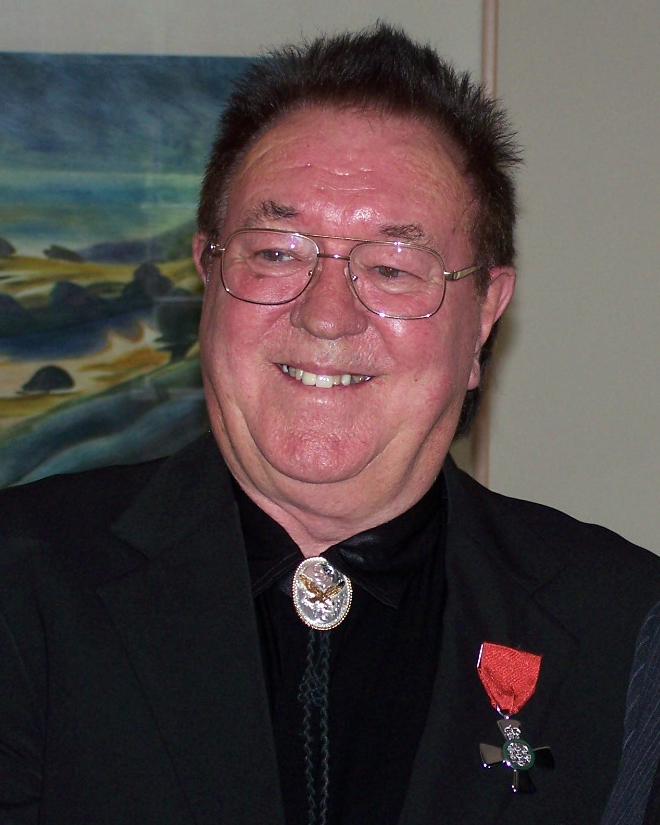
Johnny Devlin

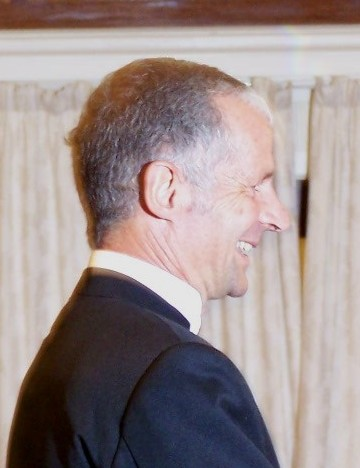
Arthur Klap

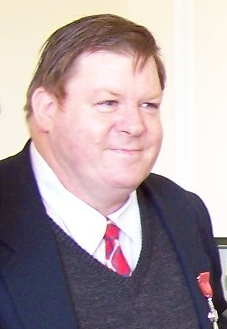
Robert Martin

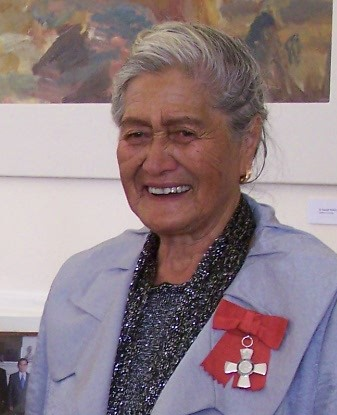
Reremoana Ngata

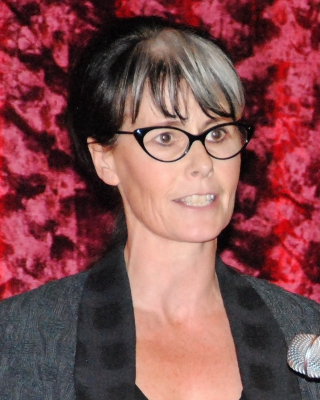
Annah Stretton

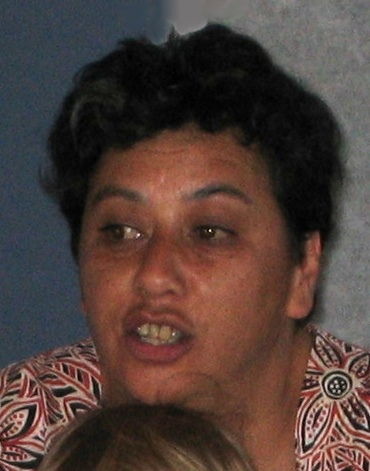
Mahingarangi Tocker

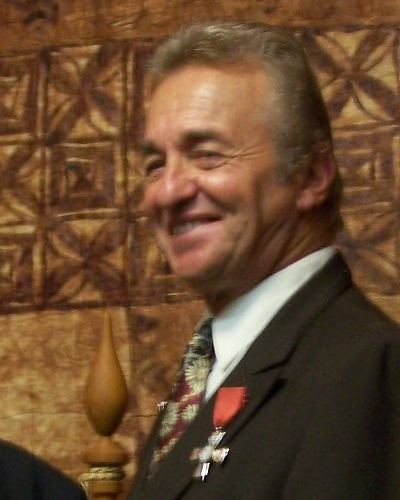
Ray Woolf

== Companion of the Queen's Service Order (QSO) ==
- Professor Richard Dodgshun Bedford – of Hamilton. For services to geography.
- Joan Margaret Bielby JP – of Manukau. For services to women.
- Mary Kathleen Bourke JP – of Hāwera. For services to local-body affairs.
- Lynn Ross Bublitz JP – of New Plymouth. For services to local-body affairs, arts, education and the community.
- Kaye Janice Crowther – of Invercargill. For services to children and the community.
- Christopher Murray Earl – of Hamilton. For services to family law and the community.
- The Right Honourable The Lord Janvrin GCB GCVO PC – of Stroud, Gloucestershire, United Kingdom. For services to New Zealand as private secretary to the Queen.
- Neville Hugo Sale Judd CVO – of Richmond. For public services.
- Associate Professor Pare Areta Keiha – of Auckland. For services to business, education and Māori.
- Joseph Mason – of Whakatāne. For services to Māori.
- Paul Kenneth Matheson JP – of Nelson. For services to local-body affairs and the community.
- Michael Thomas McEvedy JP– of Leeston. For services to local-body affairs and the community.
- Dr Edna Eileen Tait – of Whangārei. For services to education.
- The Reverend Dr Takutai Moana Wikiriwhi JP – of Auckland. For services to Māori.
- Pauline Alice Winter – of Auckland. For services to business and the Pacific Islands community.

Honorary

- Hisao Inaba – of Nikko, Japan. For services to New Zealand–Japan relations.
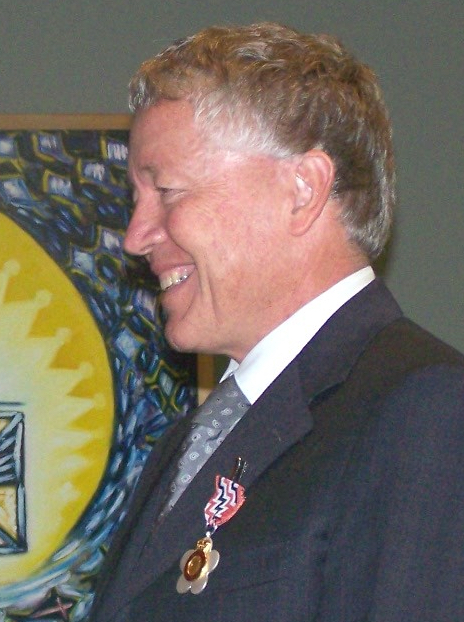
Richard Bedford

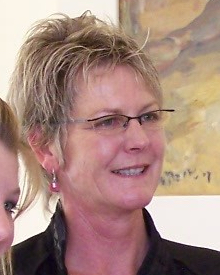
Mary Bourke

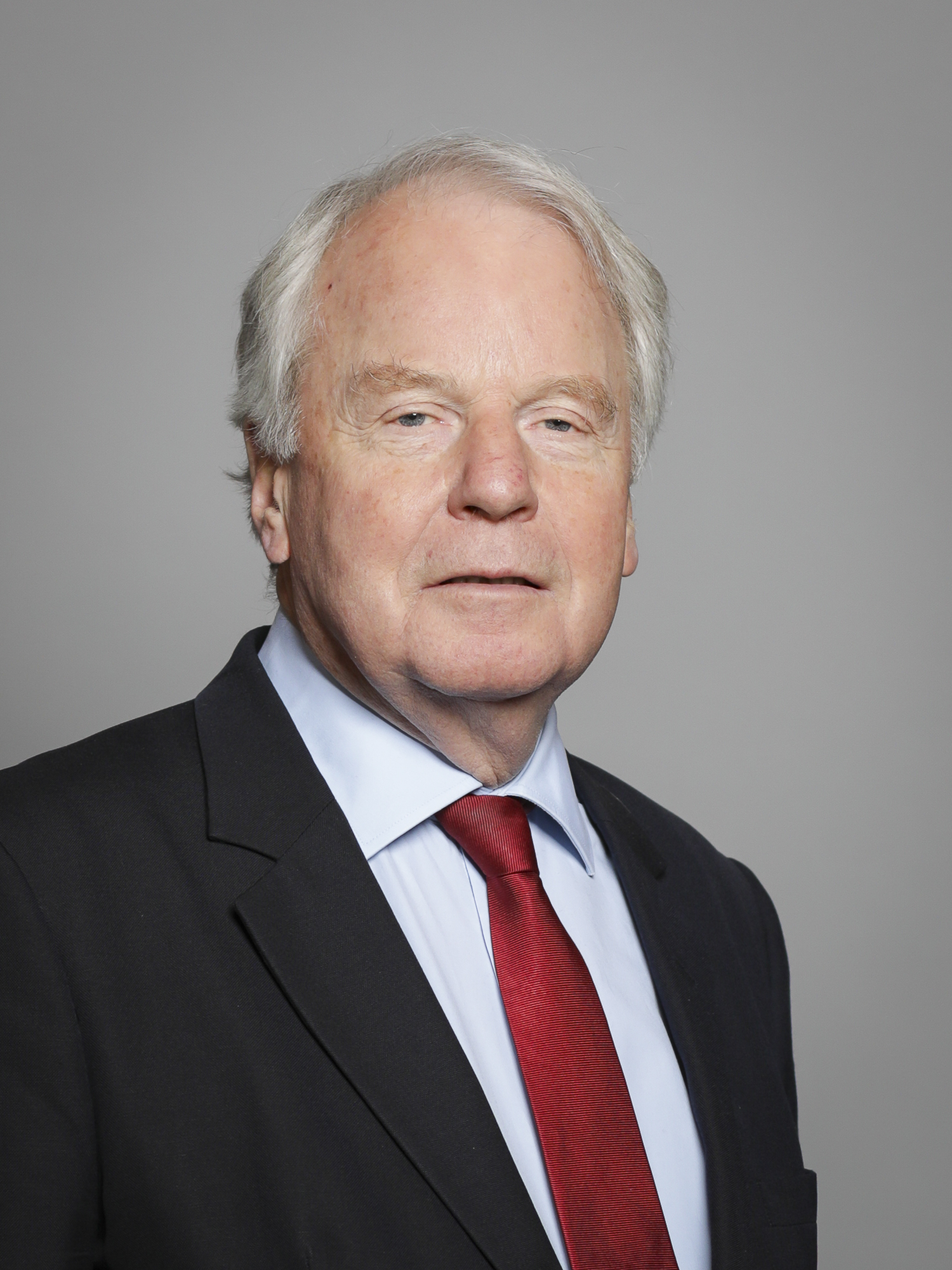
Lord Janvrin

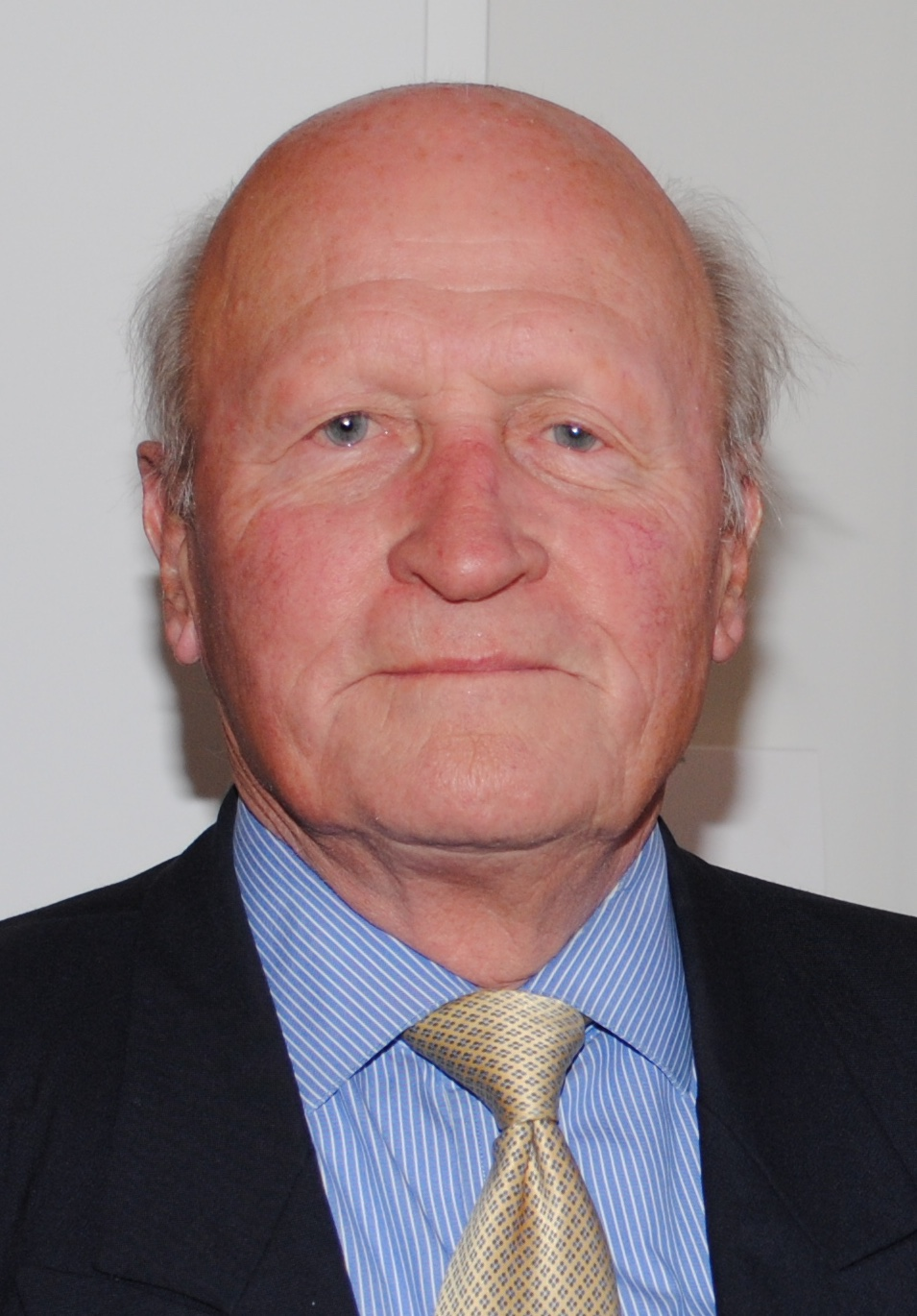
Hugo Judd

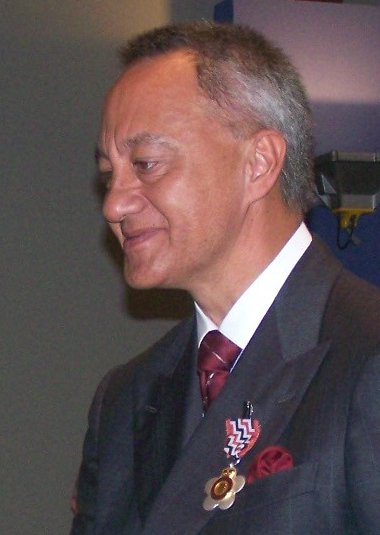
Pare Keiha

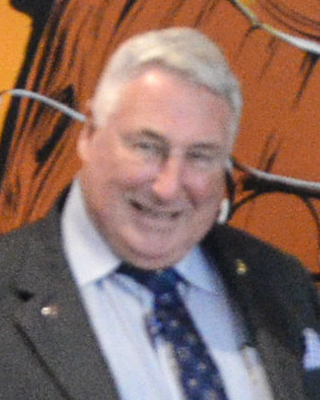
Michael McEvedy

== Queen's Service Medal (QSM) ==
- Rex James Aanensen – of Levin. For services to the community.
- Melven George (Rowdy) Aitken – of Temuka. For services to the community.
- Barrie Joseph Angland – of Palmerston North. For services to the community.
- Yvonne Gaye Anstis – of Thames. For services to adult literacy.
- Margaret Mary Barker – of Dunedin. For services to the conservation of historic places.
- Sally Carolyn Barrett – of Wellington. For services to education.
- Frances Catherine Bicknell – of Waihi. For services to the community.
- Constable Hamish Craig Blanch – of Nelson, senior constable, New Zealand Police. For services to the New Zealand Police.
- The Reverend Raymond Alexander Bloomfield JP – of Rotorua. For services to the community.
- Joanna Margaret Corner Bowden – of Goroka, Papua New Guinea. For services to special education.
- Warwick William Bowden – of Goroka, Papua New Guinea. For services to special education.
- Raymond Maxwell Brown – of Havelock North, chief fire officer, Hastings Fire District, New Zealand Fire Service. For services to the New Zealand Fire Service.
- Margaret Mary Brownsey – of Tokoroa. For services to the arts, local-body affairs and the community.
- William Llewellin Burt – of Masterton. For services to returned services personnel and the community.
- Dr Jill Juanita Calveley – of Auckland. For services to people with disabilities.
- Jennifer Ann Campbell – of Mossburn. For services to the community.
- William John Carthew JP – of Pahiatua. For services to sheep breeding and the community.
- Captain (Retired) John Donald Cleaver – of Christchurch. For services to the community.
- Ronald James Cooper JP – of Cambridge. For services to local-body affairs and the community.
- William Cranson JP – of Waikanae, lately officer in charge, Paraparaumu Fire Service, New Zealand Fire Service. For services to the New Zealand Fire Service.
- Brian Curle JP – of Huntly. For services to youth, sport and the community.
- Sharon Margaret Devonshire – of Palmerston North. For services to people with disabilities.
- Patrick John Duggan JP – of Christchurch. For services to returned services personnel.
- The Reverend Kahu Hurihia Durie – of Palmerston North. For services to Māori and the community.
- John Heywood Ross Eagles – of New Plymouth. For services to the community.
- Catherina Elizabeth Friend – of Manukau. For services to rugby league administration.
- Kenneth Edward Gray – of Christchurch. For services to the community.
- Dr Keith Richard William Hammett – of Waitakere. For services to horticulture.
- Nancy Josephine Hawks JP – of Papakura. For services to the community.
- Pauline Mary Hill JP – of Napier. For services to music and the community.
- Kahu Waiora Hohaia – of Te Kūiti. For services to conservation.
- Sheila Jean House – of Whangārei. For services to the community.
- Mereana Mokikiwa Hutchen – of Christchurch. For services to Māori, women, and the community.
- Gregory Douglas Inch – of Dunedin. For services to children with disabilities.
- Beant Singh Jador – of Papakura. For services to the Indian community.
- Valerie Joy Jensen – of Foxton. For services to the community.
- Dennis Henry Kenny – of Rotorua. For services to athletics.
- Pamela Joyce Kenny – of Rotorua. For services to athletics.
- Mohammed Faruk Usman Ali Khan – of Auckland. For services to the community.
- Sheila Lal JP – of Auckland. For services to the community.
- Margaret Ann Lawlor-Bartlett – of North Shore. For services to art.
- Percy Chew Lee – of Christchurch. For services to the Chinese community and the community.
- Gavin John Lewis Leonard – of North Shore, senior constable, New Zealand Police. For services to the New Zealand Police.
- Ronald Leonard – of Waiheke Island, chief fire officer, Waiheke Volunteer Fire Brigade, New Zealand Fire Service. For services to the New Zealand Fire Service.
- Putiputi Reremoana Mackey – of Wellington. For services to Māori performing arts and Māori.
- Hemi Wiremu (James William) Maxwell JP – of Ōpōtiki. For services to Māori.
- Lorraine Alice McDonald – of Masterton. For services to the community.
- Alexander George McNaughton – of Hamilton. For services to the community.
- David McNeil – of Matamata. For services to the environment and the community.
- Murray Moore – of Balclutha. For services to education and the community.
- Dr Antonio Noblejas – of Manukau. For services to the Filipino community.
- Nigel Brent Ogle – of Hāwera. For services to historical research and museums.
- Ainul Nisha Pala – of Waitakere. For services to ethnic communities.
- Jessica Phuang – of Auckland. For services to the community.
- John Purcell JP – of Napier. For services to the community.
- Michael John Raynes – of Lower Hutt, senior constable, New Zealand Police. For services to the community.
- Jack Basil Register – of Palmerston North. For services to art and music.
- Dr Christopher John Rutherford Robertson – of Wellington. For services to ornithology.
- Maureen Olwyn Rule – of Christchurch. For services to the community.
- Brian Patrick Schimanski – of Timaru, chief fire officer, Pleasant Point Volunteer Fire Brigade, New Zealand Fire Service. For services to the New Zealand Fire Service.
- Kerry Owen Scott – of Tūrangi. For services to soccer.
- Barry Norman Poata Smith – of Rotorua. For services to the community.
- Rosalie Jean Smith – of Katikati. For services to agricultural journalism and the community.
- Lenore Marion Sumpter – of North Shore. For services to women and the arts.
- Viola Taule'Ale'Ausumai – of Waitakere. For services to health and the Pacific Islands community.
- Ioana Semu Teao JP – of Porirua. For services to the Tokelauan community.
- Joseph Thomas Topia JP – of Kohukohu. For services to Māori and the community.
- George Walter Hugh Vercoe ED JP – of Morrinsville. For services to local body affairs.
- Zilina Teura Atua Tangata Vero – of Manukau. For services to the Cook Islands community.
- Ling Juan (Jenny) Wang – of Manukau. For services to Chinese migrants.
- Glenda Fay Wendelborn – of North Shore. For services to children.
- Ngawhakaheke Tuti Wetere JP – of Waitara. For services to the community.
- Michael James Whitehead – of Cambridge, detective senior sergeant, New Zealand Police. For services to the New Zealand Police.
- John Kenneth William Wilson – of Motueka. For services to tourism.
- Lorna Christine Wong Hop – of North Shore. For services to the Chinese community.
- Edna May Yates – of Christchurch. For services to netball.
- Helen Adair Yates – of Christchurch. For services to netball.
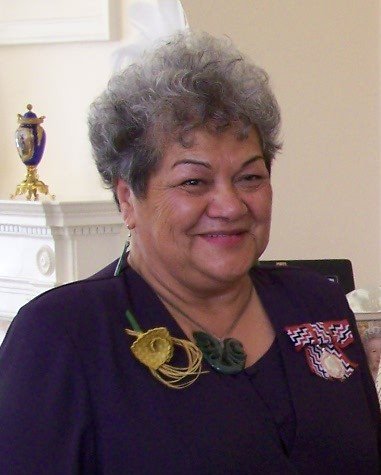
Putiputi Mackey

== New Zealand Antarctic Medal (NZAM) ==
- Dr Timothy George Haskell – of Lower Hutt. For services to Antarctic science.
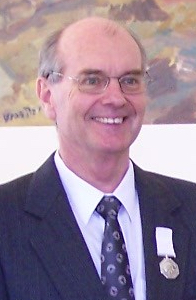
Timothy Haskell

== New Zealand Distinguished Service Decoration (DSD) ==
- Air-Vice Marshal David Anthony Bamfield ONZM – Royal New Zealand Air Force.
- Staff Sergeant Brenton Lee Beach – Royal New Zealand Infantry Regiment.
- Warrant Officer Marine Technician (Electrical) David Murray Chisnall – Royal New Zealand Navy.
- Commander Richard Lance Cook – Royal New Zealand Navy.
- Wing Commander John William Lovatt – Royal New Zealand Air Force.
- Warrant Officer Class One Mark John Richard Mortiboy – Royal New Zealand Army Logistic Regiment (The Duke of York's Own).
- Corporal Sean Anthony Ngatai – Royal New Zealand Army Logistic Regiment (The Duke of York's Own).
- Lieutenant Timothy Andrew O'Donnell – Royal New Zealand Infantry Regiment.
- Major Terence Albert Joseph O'Neill – Royal New Zealand Infantry Regiment.
- Warrant Officer Class One Kevin Andrew Yorwarth – Royal New Zealand Army Logistic Regiment (The Duke of York's Own).
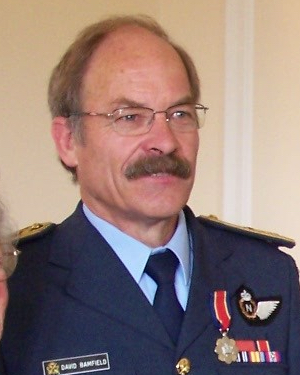
David Bamfield
