= 1998 Birthday Honours (New Zealand) =

Awards list for New Zealand

1998 Queen's Birthday Honours
- Previous: 1998 New Year Honours; Next: 1999 New Year Honours
- Type: New Zealand royal honours: New Zealand Order of Merit; Queen's Service Order; Queen's Service Medal
- Date: 1 June 1998
- Country: New Zealand

Highlights
- Total recipients: 170

The 1998 Queen's Birthday Honours in New Zealand, celebrating the official birthday of Queen Elizabeth II, were appointments made by the Queen in her right as Queen of New Zealand, on the advice of the New Zealand government, to various orders and honours to reward and highlight good works by New Zealanders. They were announced on 1 June 1998.

The recipients of honours are listed here as they were styled before their new honour.

== New Zealand Order of Merit ==
=== Dame Companion (DNZM) ===
- Susan Elizabeth Anne Devoy CBE – of Auckland. For services to sport and the community.
- Elizabeth Ann Hanan – of Dunedin. For services to the community.
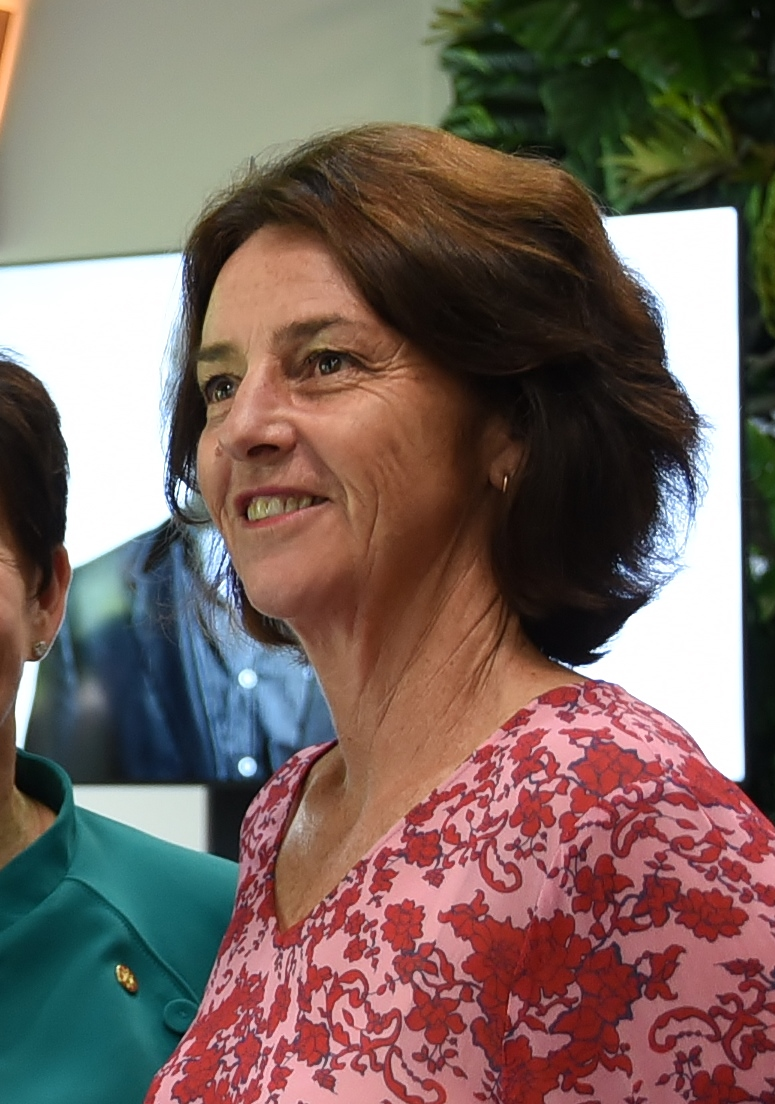
Dame Susan Devoy

=== Knight Companion (KNZM) ===
- Rajeshwar (Roger) Sarup Bhatnagar – of Auckland. For services to business and the community.
- The Right Honourable Ian Lloyd McKay – of Wellington. For services as a judge of the Court of Appeal and to the law.
- Wilson James Whineray OBE – of Auckland. For services to sport and business management.
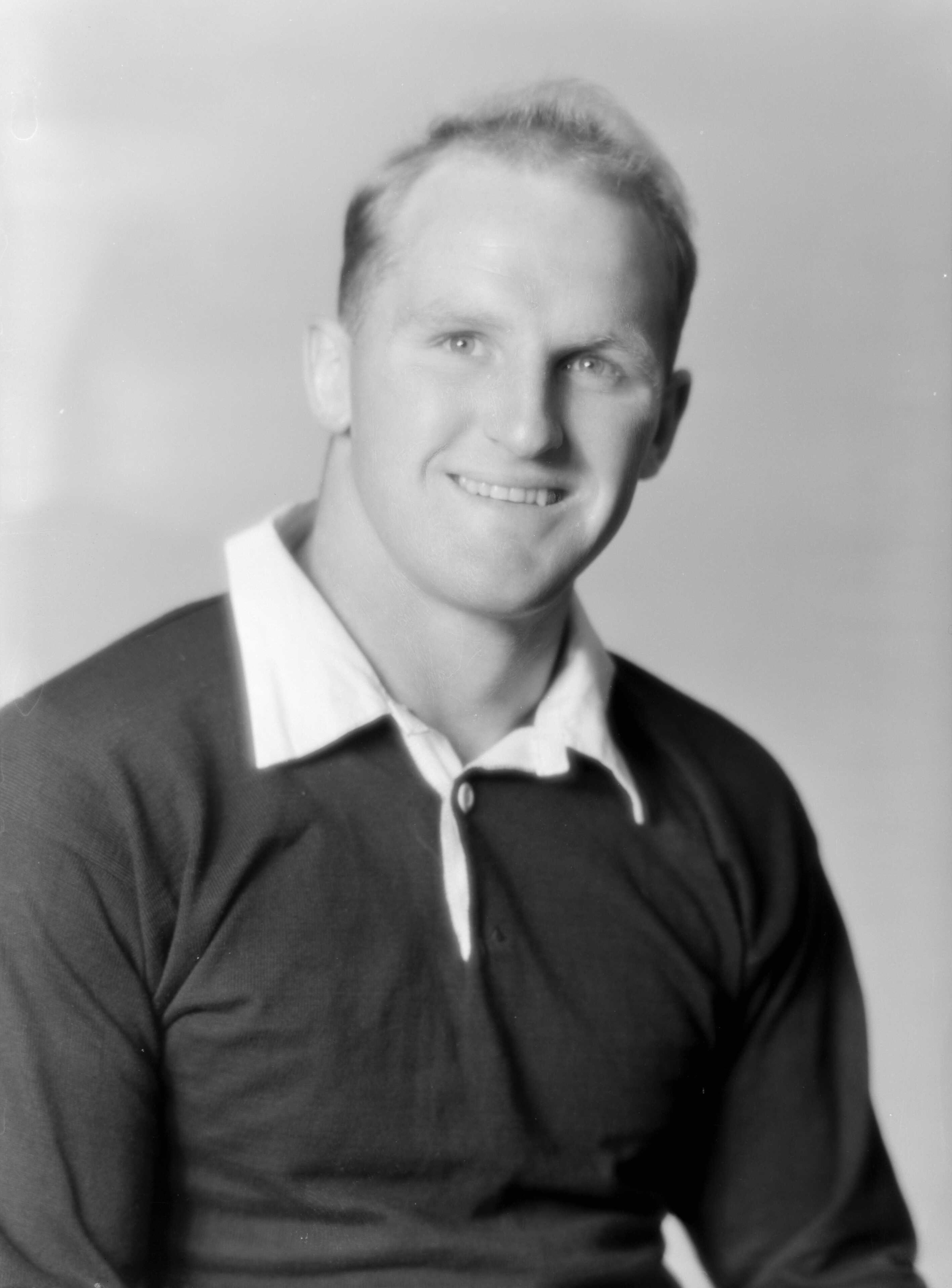
Sir Wilson Whineray

=== Companion (CNZM) ===
- Jennifer Barbara Gibbs – of Auckland. For services to art.
- Judith Leicester, Lady Hay QSO – of Christchurch. For services to the community.
- Air Vice-Marshal David William Hill OBE – Royal New Zealand Air Force.
- Alan Raymond Johnston OBE JP – of Lower Hutt. For services to the New Zealand Returned Services Association.
- Judith Anne Kilpatrick – of Auckland. For services to nursing education.
- Dr Kāterina Te Heikōkō Mataira – of Raglan. For services to the Māori language.
- Dr Judith Olwyn Medlicott – of Dunedin. For services to the legal profession, education and the community.
- Leonard Wallace David Munn – of Whangārei. For services to returned services personnel.
- Frank Ivan Joseph Nobilo – of London, United Kingdom. For services to golf.
- Noel Frank Pope JP – of Tauranga. For services to local government.
- Professor Emeritus Alexander Lindsay Rae OBE – of Palmerston North. For services to animal genetics.
- Gordon Keith Stephenson – of Putāruru. For services to conservation.
- Anna (Ans) Jacoba Westra – of Lower Hutt. For services to photography.
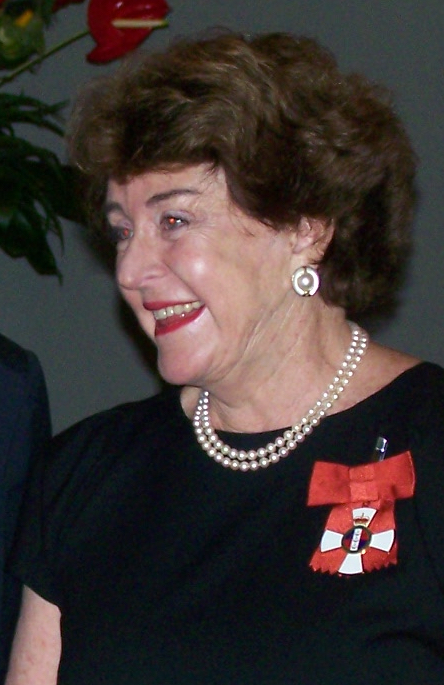
Jenny Gibbs

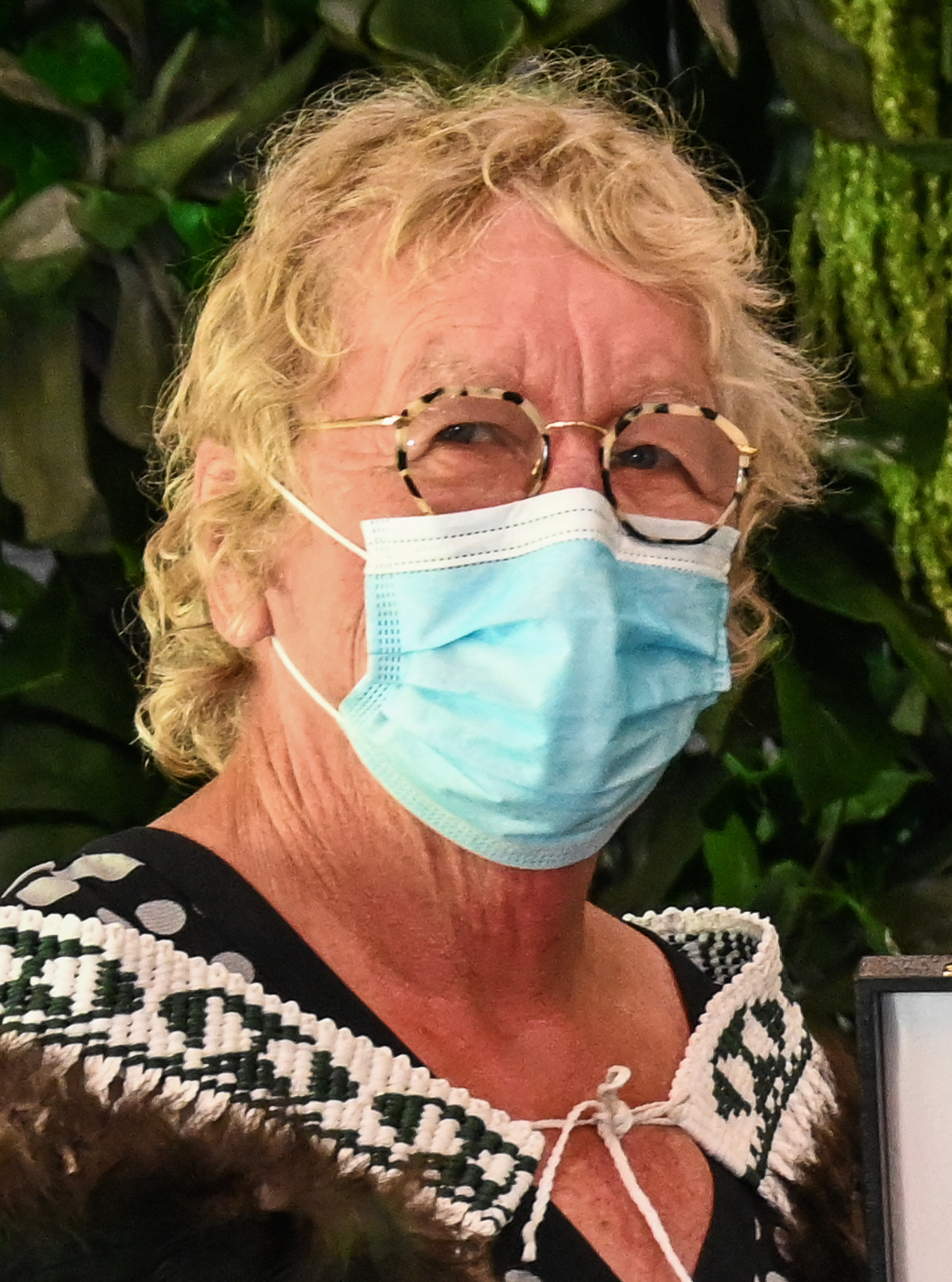
Judy Kilpatrick

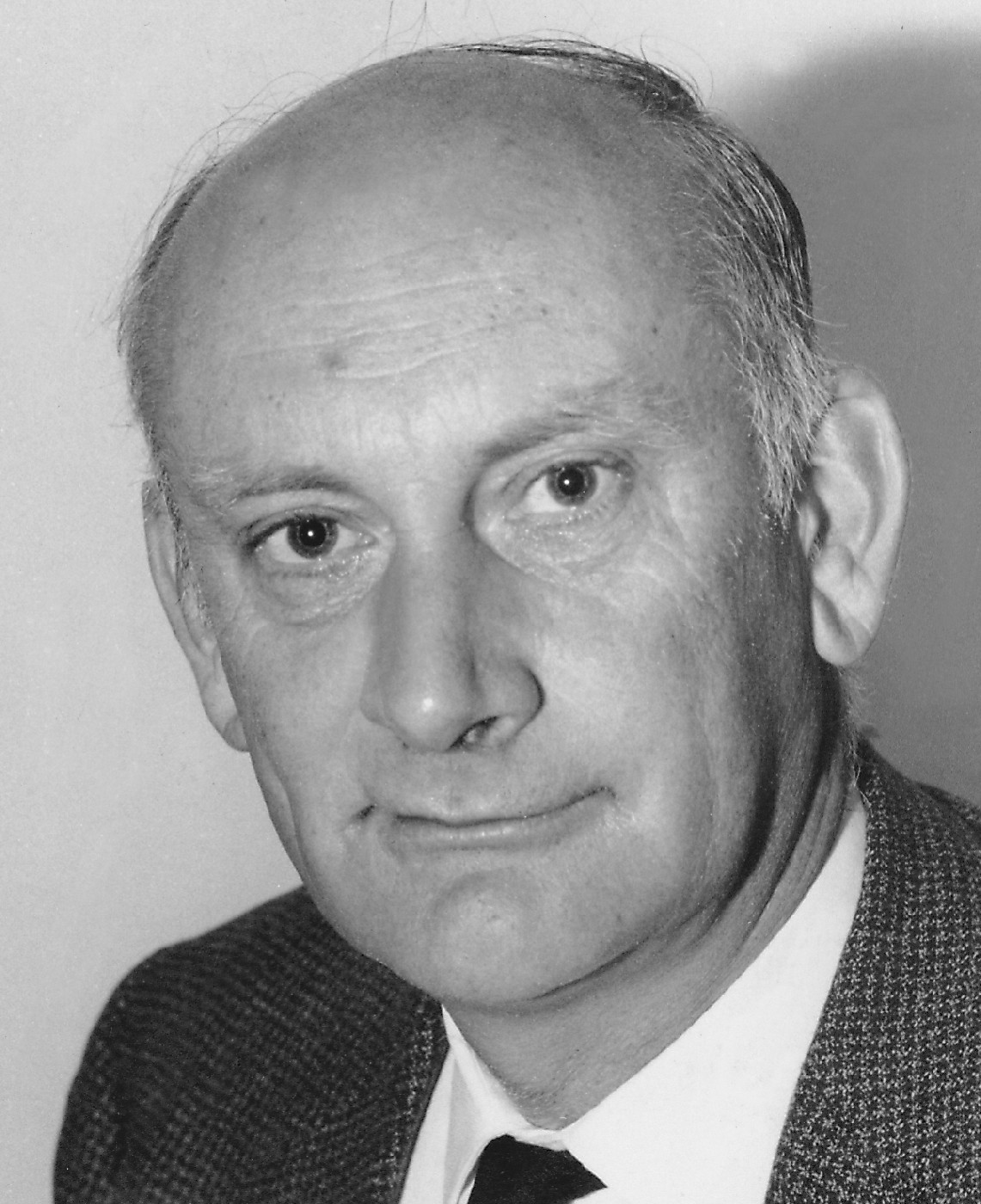
Al Rae

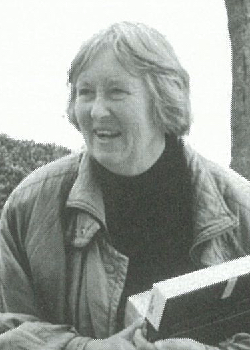
Ans Westra

=== Officer (ONZM) ===
- Dr Michael Ernest John Beard – of Christchurch. For services to medicine.
- Associate Professor Samir Nessim Bishara – of Dunedin. For services to neurosurgery.
- William Wharekaihua "Willie" Coates – of Kawerau. For services to the community.
- Dr Felix Cornelius Donnelly – of Auckland. For services to the welfare of youth.
- Rona Mary Halsall – of Westport. For services to music and the community.
- John Edward Hawke – of Auckland. For services to dentistry and the community.
- Ian Neil Holyoake – of Wellington; Assistant Commissioner, New Zealand Police.
- Stanley Jackson –of Auckland. For services to music.
- Andrew Ivan Robert Jamieson JP – of Cust. For services to business management and the community.
- Kenneth Eric Jury – of Hamilton. For services to the dairy industry.
- Joan Rosalind Leach – of Raumati Beach. For services to bowls.
- Commander Gregory Ian Lowe – Royal New Zealand Navy.
- George Lun – of Palmerston North. For services to the community.
- Colonel Ross Graham Milne ED – Colonels' List, New Zealand Army, Territorial Force.
- Suzanne Elizabeth Moncrieff – of Nelson. For services to the arts and tourism.
- Margaret Edith Mooney – of Auckland. For services to education.
- The Reverend Ronald Michael O'Grady – of Auckland. For services to children.
- Michael Tai Yang Park – of Wellington. For services to business management and Korean–New Zealand relations.
- Allan Matthew Potts – of Hastings. For services to athletics.
- Sylvia Mildred Potts – of Hastings. For services to athletics.
- Professor Sylvia Vine Sheat Rumball – of Palmerston North. For services to science.
- Rona Winsome Shepherd – of Wellington. For services to horticulture.
- George Oliver Smart – of Eastbourne, East Sussex, United Kingdom. For services to business management and the community.
- Roger Neville Walker – of Wellington. For services to architecture.
- Haki (Jack) Wihongi – of Auckland. For services to the community.

Additional

- Lieutenant Colonel Richard Philip Cassidy – Corps of Royal New Zealand Engineers. For military operational service.
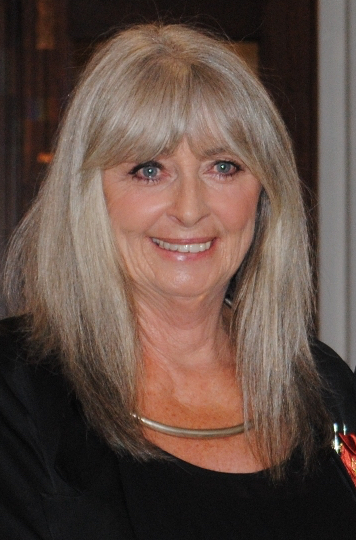
Suzie Moncrieff

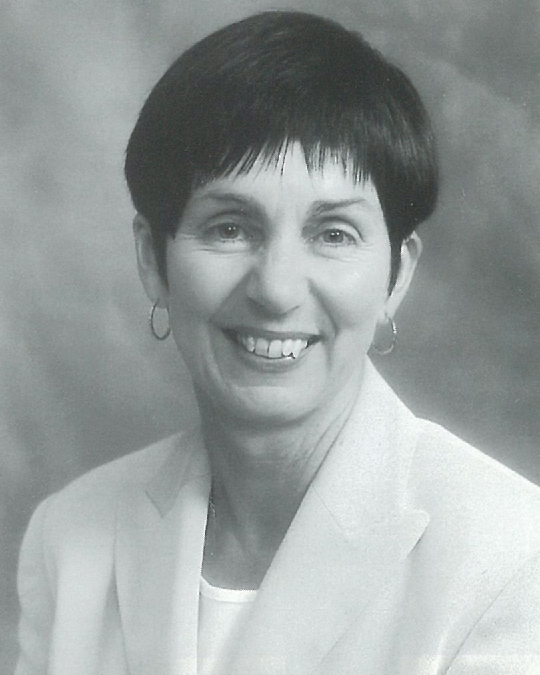
Sylvia Rumball

=== Member (MNZM) ===
- Marie Appleton JP – of Pukekohe. For services to the community.
- Trevor Percival Blundell JP – of Kaikohe. For services to the community.
- Lieutenant Colonel Geoffrey Thomas Bowes – of Havelock. For services to business management.
- James Brosnan – of Raglan. For services to local-body and community affairs.
- Marie Thérèse Nguyen-Ngoe-Dzung Burns – of Auckland. For services to the Vietnamese community.
- Ronald Thomas Cochrane – of Methven. For services to the community.
- Graeme Bruce Douglas – of Auckland. For services to the pharmaceutical industry.
- Catherine Patricia Downes – of Wellington. For services to the arts.
- Warrant Officer Class Two Michael John Flanagan – Royal New Zealand Army Logistic Regiment.
- Dorothy Whitson Freed – of Wellington. For services to music.
- Flight Sergeant Keith Anthony Gell – Royal New Zealand Air Force.
- Margaret Gluyas – of Ōtorohanga. For services to the community.
- Sergeant Brad Michael Gray – Royal New Zealand Air Force.
- Dulcie May Gunn – of Dunedin. For services to music.
- John Stevenson Holloway – of Wellington. For services to forestry and conservation.
- Peter Vernon Hubscher – of Auckland. For services to the wine industry.
- Wing Commander Neil Lloyd Hygate – Royal New Zealand Air Force.
- Colin Ernest George Kitchen – of Whangārei; fire officer, New Zealand Fire Service. For services to the New Zealand Fire Service.
- Dr Stanley Peter Lay – of Kaponga. For services to medicine and the community.
- John Allen Lee – of Christchurch. For services to the surf life-saving movement.
- Edward Roland Lindstrom – of Christchurch. For services to rowing.
- Donald Ian Matheson – of Wellington. For services to the library profession and Parliament.
- Graham Gilmer McColl – of Cambridge. For services to the hospitality industry.
- Lieutenant Commander Peter Mark McKeown – Royal New Zealand Navy.
- Pamela Jean McLeod – of Taupō. For services to welfare work.
- Vera Kirihau Morgan QSM – of Wellington. For services to the community.
- Turi Joseph Ngatai – of Rotorua. For services to education.
- Michael Earl Parmenter – of Wellington. For services to the performing arts.
- Chief Petty Officer Steven James Paul – Royal New Zealand Navy.
- The Reverend Samuelu Fa'apoi Poutasi JP – of Auckland. For services to the community.
- Gerald William Preston – of Auckland. For services to boxing and the community.
- Maurice Elwin Roberts JP – of Hokitika. For services to the community.
- The Reverend Eileen Lyley Shamy – of Ōtaki. For services to education and the community.
- Charles Alan Shaw – of Balclutha. For services to education and farming.
- Prithi Pal Singh – of Auckland. For services to the Indian community.
- Hohepa Mei Tatere – of Dannevirke. For services to local-body and community affairs.
- Charmien Mary Torrance – of Auckland. For services to nursing.
- Nichola Joan Turner – of Auckland. For services to cricket and the community.
- John Raymond Wignall – of Christchurch. For services to bridge.
- Douglas Leigh Matthew Worner – of Christchurch. For services to the community.
- Douglas James Wright – of Auckland. For services to dance.

Additional

- Corporal Daniel Hoani Dewes – Royal New Zealand Army Logistic Regiment. For military operational service.
- Warrant Officer Class One Edward Frederick Estall – Corps of Royal New Zealand Engineers. For military operational service.
- Warrant Officer Class One Tony John Harding – Royal New Zealand Army Logistic Regiment. For military operational service.
- Warrant Officer Radio Electrical Artificer William John McAlpine – Royal New Zealand Navy. For military operational service.
- Lieutenant Commander Gordon Ross Smith – Royal New Zealand Navy. For military operational service.
Dorothy Freed

== Companion of the Queen's Service Order (QSO) ==
=== For community service ===
- Atireira Ada Brown – of Bulls.
- Robin Blundell Lockie JP – of Martinborough.
- Elizabeth Sullivan – of Auckland.
- Johannes Adriaan Tasman JP – of Christchurch.
- Jill Van Angeren – of Blenheim.
- Waireti Violet Charlotte Walters JP – of Auckland.

=== For public services ===
- Leonard Gladstone Ardell – of Nelson.
- Douglas Warwick Armstrong JP – of Orewa.
- Patrick Norman Baker JP – of Drury.
- Mrs Ngarita Helen Dixon JP – of Tuatapere.
- Dr William Joseph Keith – of Auckland.
- The Honourable Maurice Patrick McTigue – of Fairfax, Virginia, United States.
- John Wallace Ridley ED – of Auckland.
- Donald John Riesterer JP – of Ōpōtiki.
- Ngahiwi Kahimia Tangaere JP – of Hastings.
- Dr John Murray Valentine – of Wellington.

== Queen's Service Medal (QSM) ==
=== For community service ===
- Kathleen Adam – of Alexandra.
- Barbara Catherine Bernstein – of Rotorua.
- Lionel Godfrey Bernstein – of Rotorua.
- Bessie Maisie Augusta Bishop – of Dannevirke.
- Francis Eric Bisset – of Kaitangata.
- John Hearn Bunker – of Christchurch.
- Mary Alma Cosford – of New Plymouth.
- Victor Thomas Curtis – of Auckland.
- Agnes Matilda Dittmer JP – of Papakura.
- Ngarena Rama Griffiths – of Waikanae.
- Mate-Anini Harawira – of Whakatāne.
- Walter Anzac Hearn – of Christchurch.
- Iris Merle Howarth-Hine – of Waihou.
- Margaret Elizabeth Jamieson – of Nelson.
- Leatrice Rose Leslie – of Renwick.
- Peggy Neva Loague JP – of Taupō.
- Edith (Pixie) Rosamund Marsh – of Marton.
- John Bedford Marsh – of Marton.
- Esther Valerie Mazey – of Wellington.
- Edith Shirley McKeever – of Napier.
- Alice Frances Christine Noble – of Greymouth.
- Teresa O'Kane (Sister Louise) – of Hokianga.
- Jean Amanda Laidlaw Orbell – of Hastings.
- Estelle Barbara Redfern – of Mount Maunganui.
- Jean Margaret Rickard – of Wellington.
- Kenneth Darrol James Ruby – of Tauranga.
- Dulcie Frances Smith – of Waiuku.
- Jack Stark – of Eltham.
- Hazel Mary Traynor – of Wellington.
- Elizabeth Gillian Dawn Westenra – of Blenheim.
- Maureen Jean Williams – of Auckland.
- Irene Elizabeth Wilmshurst – of Hamilton.

=== For public services ===
- George Bendall Allen MM – of Auckland.
- Catherine Heather Ayrton JP – of Kaikohe.
- Phoebe Mabel Barrett – of Christchurch.
- Joseph Hicks Bawden – of Orewa.
- Mary Collins Broderick – of Auckland.
- Charles Andrew Burnett JP – of Rotorua.
- Brent Sutton Bythell – of Ōtaki.
- Allan Stuart Drinkrow – of Manukau City.
- Shirley Ann Groombridge – of Masterton.
- Edna Rose Harrison – of Pukekohe.
- Beverley Rae Henneker – of Hamilton.
- Rae Monteath Hewson – of Ashburton.
- Hewitt Royden Humphrey JP – of Wellington.
- John William Jameson – of Christchurch.
- Ian Cecil Knox JP – of Kerikeri.
- Beverly Amelia Lynds – of Waikanae Beach.
- Francis Edward Burnside Malcolm JP – of Manukau City.
- Mervyn Charles McFarlane – of Patutahi; district officer, Patutahi Volunteer Fire Brigade, New Zealand Fire Service.
- William Malcolm McKee JP – of Riversdale.
- Jean Heather McKenzie – of Whangārei.
- Michael Francis Montague – of Auckland.
- Noel John Oliver – of Takapau; lately chief fire officer, Takapau Volunteer Fire Brigade, New Zealand Fire Service.
- Richard Wayne Olsen – of Dunedin; lately sergeant, New Zealand Police.
- Yvonne Shirley Ann Palmer – of Christchurch.
- John Marshall Reedy – of Tikitiki.
- Molly Te-Wharerakau Whititera Samuels JP – of Katikati.
- Nicholas Tafao Pa'u Tuitasi – of Auckland; senior constable, New Zealand Police.
- Dr Gavin Wallace – of Wainuiomata.
- Beryl Theresa Walter (Sister Mary Fidelis) – of Auckland.
- Richard John Weir – of Wellington.
- Janet Wilson – of Auckland.
- Nanette Anne Wright – of Waimate.
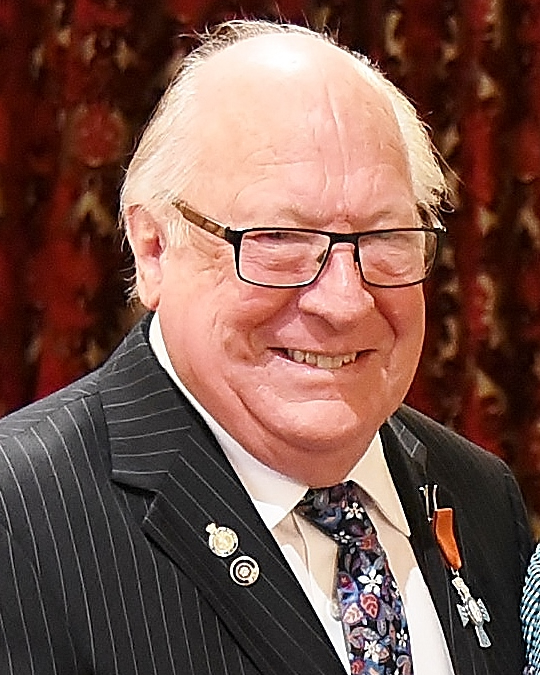
Hewitt Humphrey
