= Ken Stevens =

Kenneth Stevens or Ken Stevens may refer to:

- Kenneth H. Stevens (1922–2005), British Scouting leader
- Kenneth N. Stevens (1924–2013), Canadian electrical engineer and acoustic phonetics scientist
- Ken Stevens (businessman) (born c. 1944), New Zealand engineer and businessman
