= Jenny Campbell (disambiguation) =

Jenny Campbell (born 1961) is a former British banker and panelist on Dragons' Den.

Jenny Campbell may also refer to:

- Jenny Campbell (artist) (1895–1970), Scottish-born New Zealand artist
- Jenny Campbell, cartoonist who writes Flo & Friends
- Jenny Campbell (environmentalist), New Zealand environmentalist
