= Robert Martin (disability rights activist) =

New Zealand disability rights activist (1957–2024)

Sir Robert Martin KNZM
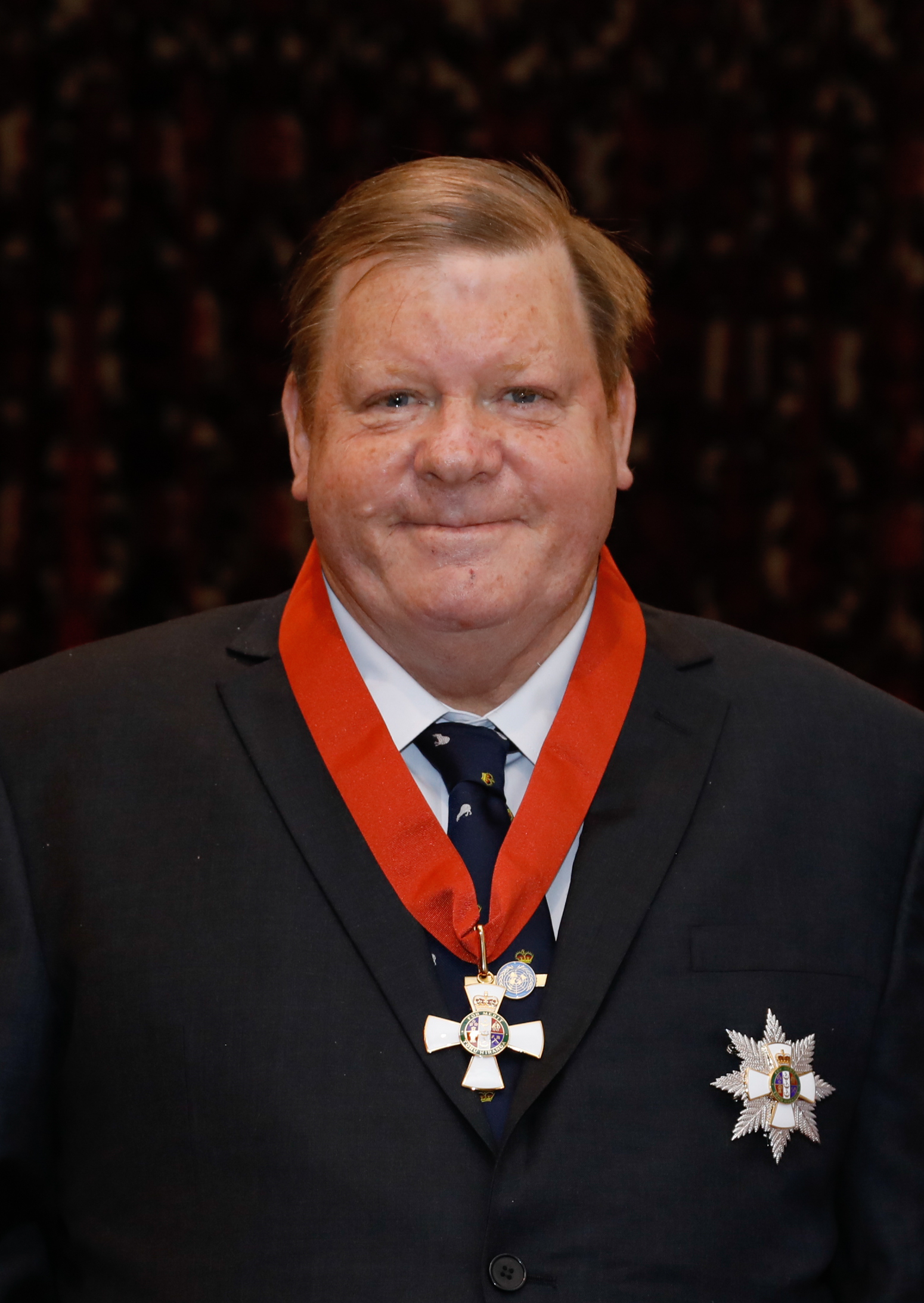
- Martin in 2020
- Born: Robert George Martin; 13 August 1957; Wellington, New Zealand
- Died: 30 April 2024 (aged 66); Whanganui, New Zealand
- Known for: Disability rights activism

Sir Robert George Martin KNZM (13 August 1957 – 30 April 2024) was a New Zealand disability rights activist who promoted the self advocacy movement internationally and was involved in the proceedings resulting in the United Nations Convention on the Rights of Persons with Disabilities. He was a member of the United Nations Committee on the Rights of Persons with Disabilities from 2017 until his death.

== Early life ==
Martin was born in Wellington, New Zealand, on 13 August 1957. A difficult birth resulted in a brain injury. As a baby he was sent to Kimberley Mental Deficiency Colony (later renamed the Kimberley Centre).

Apart from brief periods living with his family and a failed attempt at fostering, Martin spent his childhood in institutions as a ward of the state. These institutions included Lake Alice Hospital (a psychiatric hospital) and Campbell Park School. In his biography, Martin describes inhumane conditions and abuse in these institutions which he would later campaign to close.

== Career ==
In 1972, Martin was released from care and returned to Whanganui. For a short while he lived with his parents but the relationship was characterised by violence and unhappiness. Over several years, Martin lived and worked in the care of IHC New Zealand, an advocacy and care organisation for people with intellectual disabilities in New Zealand. During this period, Martin began educating himself, often through books he stole. He became involved in activities to break down barriers for people with learning disabilities, including protests and non co-operation with carers. He organised a strike of intellectually disabled farm-workers.

By the time he was in his mid-twenties, Martin was playing a leading role in the disability rights organisation People First. He held office at regional and national level, and in 1993 travelled to Canada to represent New Zealand at a People First conference. Shortly after this, Martin participated in the writing of The Beliefs, Values, and Principles of Self-Advocacy.

In the mid 1990s, Martin was appointed to the staff of IHC as a travelling advocate in New Zealand. His role was to promote self-advocacy among people with disabilities and to build public understanding that would enable the movement of people with intellectual disabilities from institutions into the community.

Martin also travelled overseas extensively for Inclusion International, promoting self-advocacy. He became a council member of Inclusion International and in 2003 was appointed Inclusion International's representative on the United Nations Ad Hoc Committee "to consider proposals for a comprehensive and integral international convention to promote and protect the rights and dignity of persons with disabilities". For a period, Martin was the only person with a learning disability involved in the UN proceedings, participating particularly in discussions around the status of families (Preamble X of the convention) and the right of people with disabilities to live in the community (Article 19).

In 2016, Martin made history as the first person with a learning disability elected onto a United Nations treaty body, when he was elected to the Committee for the Rights of Persons with Disabilities. His first term on the committee ran from 2017 to 2020. Then-New Zealand Disability Rights Commissioner, Paul Gibson, said "Robert Martin hasn't just smashed through a glass ceiling, he's smashed through the ceiling and walls of institutions that locked him away for most of his early years. Every New Zealander can be proud of his incredible achievement today." In November 2020, he was re-elected to the United Nations Committee on the Rights of Persons with Disabilities for another term.

== Personal life ==
In 2014, a biography of Martin was published and he was featured in a television documentary series. The Robert Martin Self Advocate Leader Award is awarded by himself at the annual Having a Say Conference in Australia, to the participant whose self-advocacy impresses him most. Martin lived in Whanganui with his wife Lynda. He died in Whanganui on 30 April 2024.

== Honours and awards ==
In the 2008 New Year Honours, Martin was appointed a Member of the New Zealand Order of Merit, for services to people with disabilities. He was promoted to Knight Companion of the New Zealand Order of Merit in the 2020 New Year Honours, also for services to people with disabilities.
