= Judy Kilpatrick =

New Zealand nursing academic

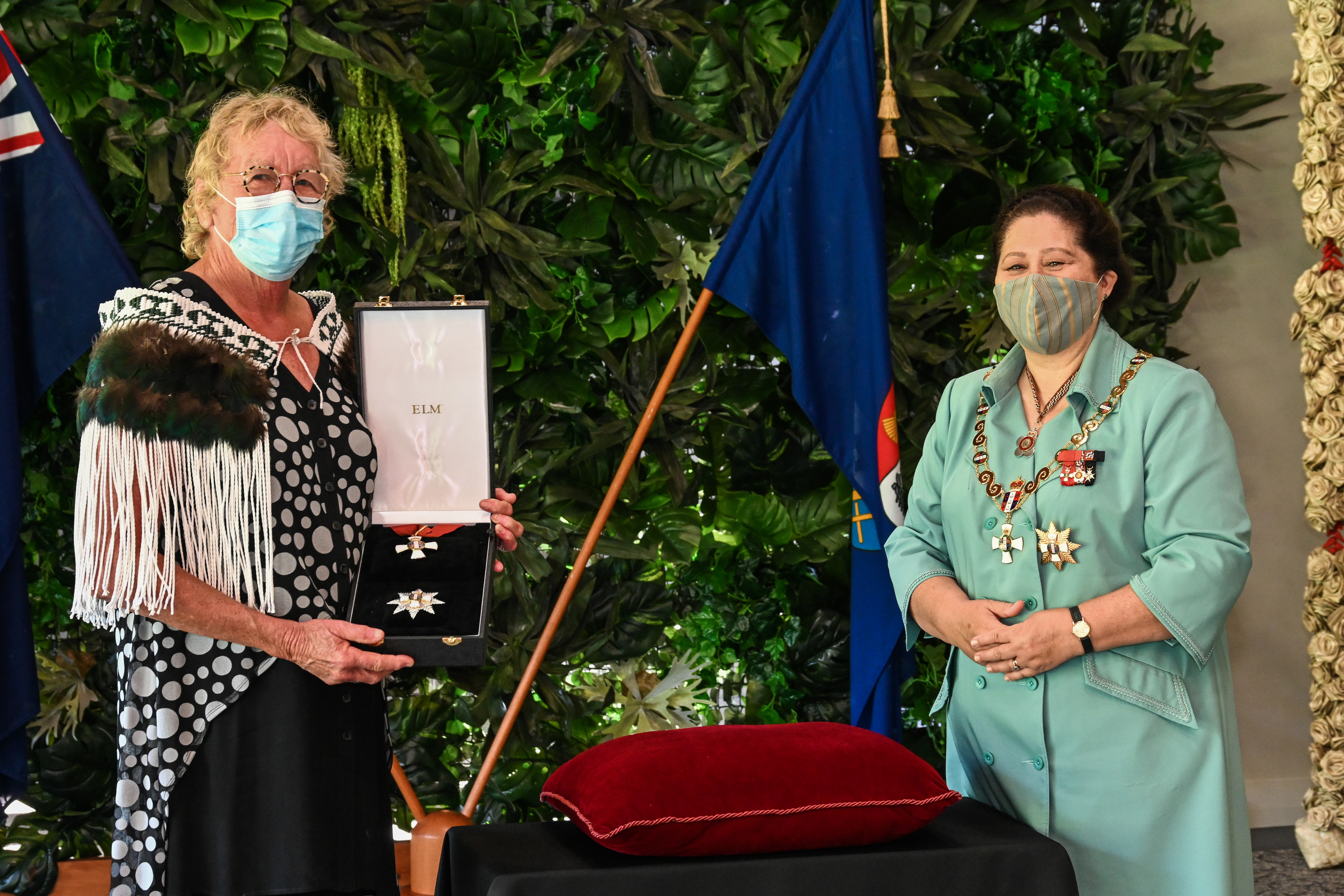
Kilpatrick (left), after her investiture as a Dame Companion of the New Zealand Order of Merit by the governor-general, Dame Cindy Kiro, at Government House, Auckland, on 18 February 2022

Dame Judith Anne Kilpatrick DNZM (born 1949 or 1950) is a retired New Zealand nursing academic. After serving as head of the nursing school at the Auckland Institute of Technology, she moved to the University of Auckland, where she co-founded the School of Nursing in 1999.

In the 1998 Queen's Birthday Honours, she was appointed a Companion of the New Zealand Order of Merit, for services to nursing education. In the 2021 Queen's Birthday Honours, she was promoted to Dame Companion of the same order, also for services to nursing education.
