= Heather Ayrton =

New Zealand coroner, journalist, heritage advocate and community leader (1934–2024)

Heather Ayrton QSM JP
- Born: Catherine Heather Donaldson; 20 April 1934
- Died: 24 May 2024 (aged 90)
- Occupations: Journalist; justice of the peace; coroner
- Known for: Queen's Service Medal recipient
- Spouse: Robin William John Ayrton (died 1988)

Catherine Heather Ayrton QSM JP (née Donaldson; 20 April 1934 – 24 May 2024) was a New Zealand coroner, journalist, and community heritage and conservation advocate.

== Biography ==
After becoming a justice of the peace in 1975, Ayrton was appointed coroner for the Bay of Islands, the second woman to hold the position. She was a journalist for the New Zealand Herald for 35 years.

Ayrton joined the committee of the Northland branch of the New Zealand Historic Places Trust in 1984, and then Heritage Northland in 2015. She supported many other community groups, acting as patron for Hokianga Historical Society and chair of the Northland Conservation Board, among other roles.

In the 1998 Queen's Birthday Honours, Ayrton was awarded the Queen’s Service Medal for public services.

Ayrton died on 24 May 2024, at the age of 90. She had been predeceased by her husband Robin William John Ayrton in 1988, and was buried with him at Kaikohe Cemetery.
