= Ken Ruby =

New Zealand wrestler

Ken Ruby QSM
Personal information
- Birth name: Kenneth Darrol James Ruby
- Born: 14 August 1921; Wellington, New Zealand
- Died: 10 September 2011 (aged 90); Tauranga, New Zealand

Sport
- Country: New Zealand
- Sport: Wrestling
- Club: Kilbirne Gym

Achievements and titles
- National finals: Featherweight champion (1948)

Kenneth Darrol James Ruby QSM (14 August 1921 – 10 September 2011) was a New Zealand wrestler who represented his country at the 1954 British Empire and Commonwealth Games. He was later a wrestling referee and judge.

== Early life ==
Ruby was born on 14 August 1921, and grew up in Wellington. He was educated at Rongotai College, and went on to work at the Wellington Paper Company. During World War II, Ruby served with the 2nd New Zealand Expeditionary Force and saw active service in the Pacific.

== Wrestling ==
A member of the Kilbirnie Gym, Ruby won the New Zealand national amateur wrestling championship in the featherweight division in 1948.

At the 1954 British Empire and Commonwealth Games in Vancouver, Ruby competed in the bantamweight division. He lost his opening two bouts, against Ian Epton representing Northern Rhodesia and Muhammad Amin from Pakistan, and was eliminated to place fifth overall.

At the 1978 Commonwealth Games in Edmonton, Ruby was a referee and judge, and in 1980 he was awarded life membership of the New Zealand Olympic Wrestling Association.

== Later life and death ==
Ruby moved to Wanganui in 1954, and worked for Weeks Printing Company and then New Zealand Railways. He established a wrestling gym in Wanganui, and worked with local police to set up a club to increase children's participation in sports. He retired to Tauranga in 1983. In the 1998 Queen's Birthday Honours, Ruby was awarded the Queen's Service Medal for community service.

Ruby died in Tauranga on 10 September 2011.
