= Jenny Campbell (environmentalist) =

New Zealand environmentalist

Jennifer Ann Campbell QSM is a New Zealand environmentalist and former teacher. She was head of the Southland branch of the environmental protection organisation Forest & Bird, and has written for regional newspapers. She taught at Northern Southland College in Lumsden. In the 2008 New Year's Honours, Campbell received the Queen's Service Medal for services to the community.

== Biography ==
Campbell grew up in Southland, on a farm, but describes her interest in environmentalism started as she started teacher training. In 2001, Campbell co-founded the Invercargill Environmental Community (IEC) and was convener up until the permanent closure of the IEC in 2017. As head of the Southland branch and secretary of the environmental protection organisation Forest and Bird, she was able to continue the events formerly organised by the IEC, such as the Spring Eco Fest. The New Zealand Ministry for the Environment received submissions from Campbell on matters such as the Clean Water discussion document and the Climate Change Response (Zero Carbon) Amendment Act.

Other environmental work by Campbell includes the organisation of local fundraisers, starting petitions, and a permanent display of protest signs against the use of fossil fuels at her garden fence in Mossburn.

Campbell also does journalistic work, including writing for newspapers like the regional Southland Times and contributing to the Southland Oral History Project at the Invercargill Library. Additionally, she provides her assistance to the local community regarding mental health issues and as a pastoral supervisor at CAIRA NZ, an organisation for professional pastoral supervision.

After moving from Wairarapa to Southland, Campbell taught maths and biology at Northern Southland College in Lumsden.

=== Recognition ===
Campbell received the Queen's Service Medal in the 2008 New Year Honours, for services to the community.
