= Sylvia Rumball =

New Zealand chemist, ethicist and academic

Sylvia Rumball CNZM
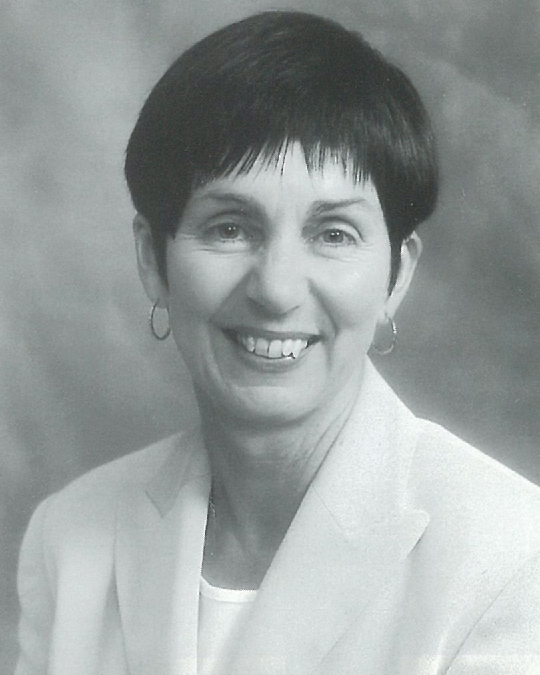
- Rumball, c. 1998
- Born: Sylvia Vine Sheat; 1939 (age 86–87)
- Education: University of Canterbury (MSc); University of Auckland (PhD)
- Scientific career
- Workplaces: Massey University
- Thesis: Some structural investigations of copper co-ordination compounds (1966)
- Doctoral advisor: Neil Waters

Sylvia Vine Sheat Rumball CNZM (née Sheat; born 1939) is a New Zealand scientist and an international expert in scientific research ethics.

== Education ==
Rumball completed a BSc and MSc (1962) at the University of Canterbury. She moved to the University of Auckland where she undertook a PhD in chemistry (1966), supervised by Professor (later Sir) Neil Waters.

== Career ==
During her PhD studies, Rumball worked as a junior lecturer at the University of Auckland from 1963 to 1966. She then moved to the University of Oxford on a postdoctoral fellowship and studied protein crystallography under Dorothy Hodgkin.

Rumball joined Massey University as a lecturer in 1967. She was promoted to associate professor in 2000 and to full professor by 2005, when she was also assistant to the Vice Chancellor (Equity and Ethics) at Massey. She served on the University Council from 2005 to 2008. She was appointed Professor Emeritus in July 2009, officially retiring in November of the same year.

To celebrate the centenary of women's suffrage in New Zealand, Rumball was selected as one of eight women to give graduation addresses at Massey University in 1993.

From 2002 to 2011 she was chair of the National Ethics Committee on Assisted Human Reproduction, later known as the Advisory Committee on Assisted Reproductive Technology (ACART). She also served on the Drug Free Sport New Zealand Board from 2007 to 2015. Rumball also served on UNESCO's International Bioethics Committee and the International Council for Science's Committee on Freedom and Responsibility in the conduct of Science.

== Honours and awards ==
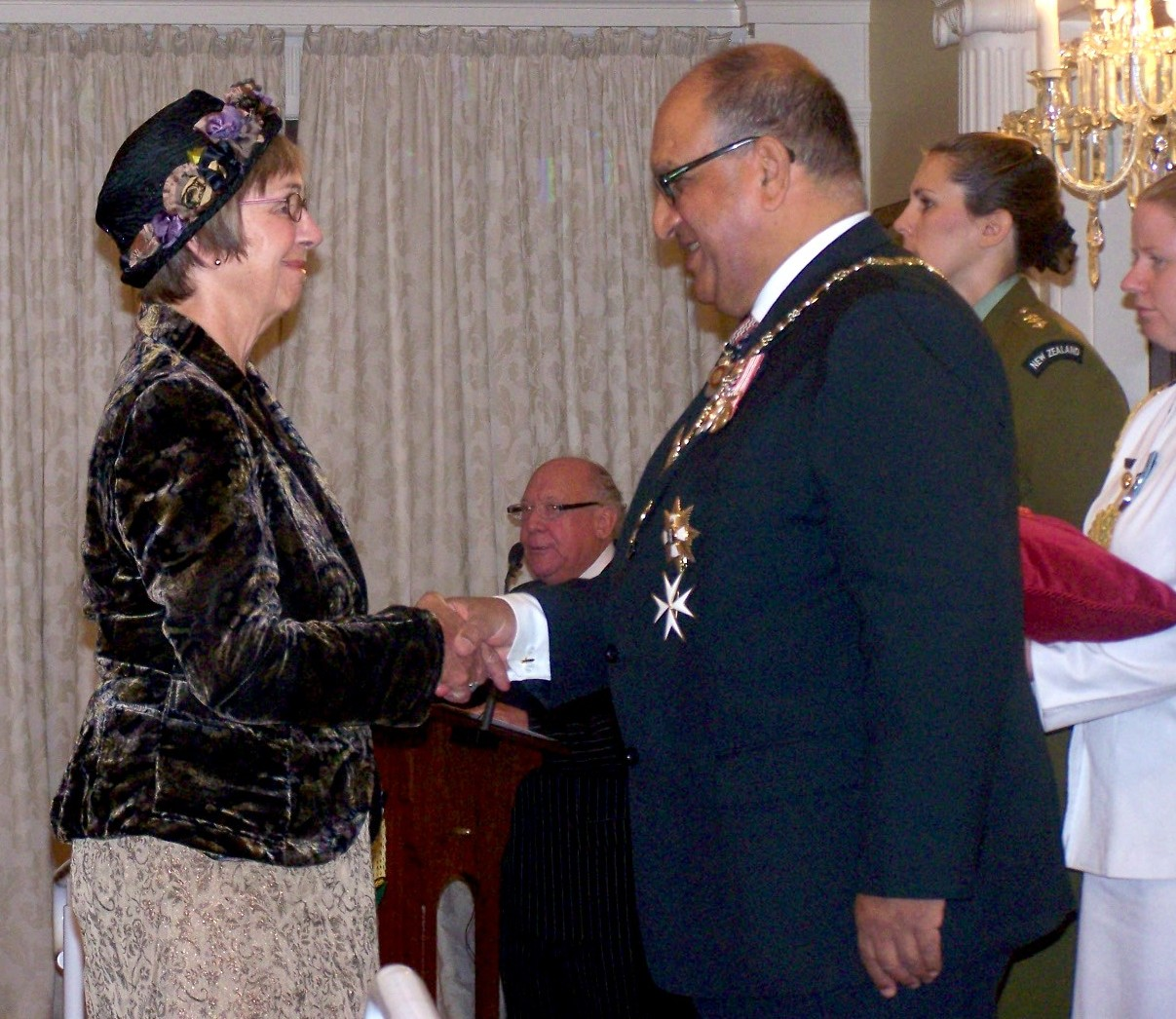
Rumball (left) being congratulated by the governor-general, Anand Satyanand, on her investiture as a Companion of the New Zealand Order of Merit at Government House, Wellington, on 4 April 2008

Rumball was appointed an Officer of the New Zealand Order of Merit, for services to science, in the 1998 Queen's Birthday Honours. In the 2008 New Year Honours, she was promoted to Companion of the New Zealand Order of Merit, also for service to science.
