= Sylvia Potts =

New Zealand middle-distance runner

Sylvia Potts ONZM
Personal information
- Born: Sylvia Mildred Oxenham; 19 September 1943 Palmerston North, New Zealand
- Died: 31 August 1999 (aged 55) Hastings, New Zealand
- Education: University of Otago
- Height: 1.68 m (5 ft 6 in)
- Weight: 55 kg (121 lb)
- Spouse: Allan Potts (m. 1965)

Sport
- Sport: Athletics
- Events: 800 m, 1500 m
- Coached by: Allan Potts

Achievements and titles
- National finals: 440 yds champion (1967, 1969); 400 m champion (1970); 880 yds champion (1969); 800 m champion (1970); 3 km cross country champion (1970)
- Personal best: 800 m – 2:04.0

Sylvia Mildred Potts ONZM (née Oxenham, 19 September 1943 – 31 August 1999) was a New Zealand middle-distance athlete who represented her country at two Commonwealth and one Olympic Games. She memorably fell two metres from the finish of the 1500 m final at the 1970 Commonwealth Games in Edinburgh while leading the race.

== Early life and family ==
Born in Palmerston North in 1943, Potts was educated at Freyberg High School, where she was head girl. She then studied at the University of Otago, completing a Diploma of Physical Education in 1964. She married Allan Potts the following year. Together they had three children, including Richard Potts who represented New Zealand in athletics at the 1990 and 1994 Commonwealth Games.

== Athletics career ==
=== National championships ===
Coached by Allan Potts from 1963, Sylvia Potts won six national athletics titles between 1967 and 1970: the 440 yards in 1967 and 1969; the 400 m in 1970; the 880 yards in 1969; the 800 m in 1970 and the 3 km cross country in 1970.

Potts ran her personal best for the 800 m, a national record time of 2:04.0, in winning the 1970 national championship.

=== Olympic Games ===
She represented New Zealand at the 1968 Olympic Games in Mexico City, where she finished sixth in the semi-finals of the 800 m with a time of 2:07.02.

=== Commonwealth Games ===
At the 1970 British Commonwealth Games in Edinburgh in 1970 Potts competed in both the 800 m and 1500 m, reaching the final in both events. She finished fifth in the 800 m, but it is for her finish in the 1500 m that she is most remembered. Leading the race into the final few metres, Potts fell just short of the finishing line and eventually finished in ninth place.

Potts was given the honour of running the final leg of the Queen's Baton Relay at the opening of the 1974 British Commonwealth Games in Christchurch, running the baton carrying the Queen's message into the Queen Elizabeth II Park stadium and presenting it to the Duke of Edinburgh. Later at those games, she finished eighth in the 1500 m final.

=== Coaching and management ===
After retiring as an athlete, Potts joined her husband Allan as a coach, and together they coached many young athletes, particularly at the Hastings Athletics Club. In 1990, she served as the New Zealand athletics team manager at the 1990 Commonwealth Games in Auckland.

== Death ==
Potts died in Hastings from cancer on 31 August 1999, and she was buried at Mangaroa Cemetery.

== Honours and legacy ==
In the 1998 Queen's Birthday Honours, Potts was appointed an Officer of the New Zealand Order of Merit, for services to athletics. In 2008, she was one of the second group of inductees onto the University of Otago School of Physical Education's wall of fame.

Following Potts' death, the major annual track and field meet in Hawke's Bay was named the Sylvia Potts Classic. It was renamed the Allan and Sylvia Potts Classic in 2015 after the death of Allan Potts.
