= Putiputi Mackey =

New Zealand Māori teacher and arts supporter (1940–2023)

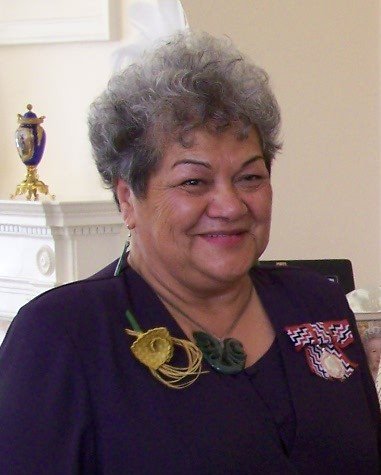
- Mackey in 2008.
- Born: September 25, 1940; New Zealand
- Died: April 14, 2023 (aged 82)

Putiputi Reremoana Mackey (née McClutchie, also Stevens, 25 September 1940–14 April 2023) was a Māori teacher and arts supporter from New Zealand.

She taught in the 19070s at Wellington East Girls' College, and was an officer of the National Association for the Teaching of Māori in 1982.

When Bishop Justin Duckworth was installed as 11th Bishop of Wellington in 2012, she was the kaikaranga who called the congregation into the cathedral.

At a kapa haka event at Te Papa in 2023 after her death, she was described as "at the heart of Taikura Kapa Haka for many years as a founding member of the He Kura Te Tangata Trust."

She was awarded the Queen's Service Medal in the 2008 New Year Honours, "for services to Māori performing arts and Māori", and in 2023 she was posthumously given the Te Papa Tongarewa Rongomaraeroa Award by Te Papa, the national museum.

She married Stanton Mackey in May 1964.
