= Robin Kay =

New Zealand artist and historian

Robin Kay CNZM
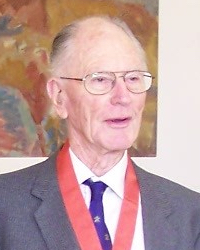
- Kay in 2008
- Born: Robin Langford Kay; 23 June 1919
- Died: 7 April 2017 (aged 97)

Robin Langford Kay CNZM (23 June 1919 – 7 April 2017) was a New Zealand artist and historian.

== Biography ==
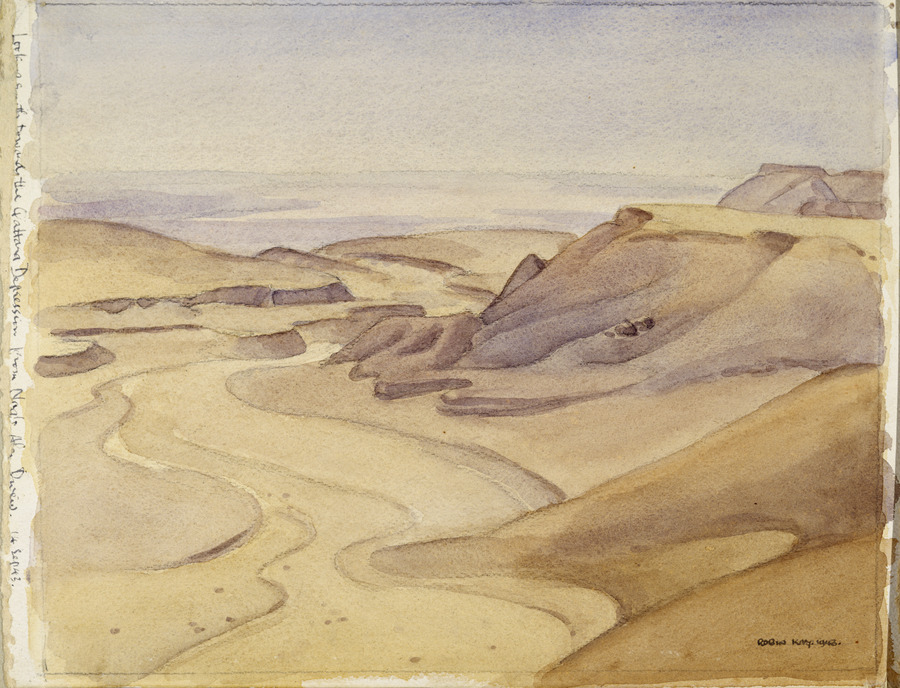
Robin Kay's painting of Libyan Desert

Born in 1919 in Waipawa, Kay spent in early years in Christchurch in the care of his aunt due to his mother's poor health. In 1928, the family moved to Napier. He was educated at Gisborne Boys High School and spent a year at Christ's College in Christchurch. He also studied art part-time at Canterbury University College of Art. He then moved to the Manawatu taking up employment as a cadet journalist in Palmerston North.

During World War II Kay served as a war artist with the 2nd New Zealand Expeditionary Force in the Middle East and Italy, was commissioned as a temporary second lieutenant in 1944, and later joined the war history staff under Major General Sir Howard Kippenberger. He graduated from Victoria University College with a Bachelor of Arts degree in 1949. As well as contributing to the Official History of New Zealand in the Second World War 1939–45—writing the history of 27 (Machine Gun) Battalion and Italy Volume II: From Cassino to Trieste—Kay wrote extensively on New Zealand military history and external relations. He also co-authored, with Tony Eden, a history of the New Zealand Academy of Fine Arts (NZAFA) in 1983.

Kay became an artist member of the NZAFA in 1938, going on to exhibit over 450 works. He served on the Academy Council from 1960 to 1983, and in 1975 he was made a life member of the NZAFA. In 2007, Kay received the Governor General's Award from the NZAFA and became a Fellow of the New Zealand Academy of Fine Arts. Kay was a member of Watercolour New Zealand since it was founded in 1975.

Between 1962 and 1970, he won 1st prize, 2nd prize and six merit awards for watercolour in the National Bank Art Awards.

His paintings have been purchased by the National Art Gallery, Archives New Zealand, the Turnbull Library, US President Lyndon B. Johnson, Prime Minister Keith Holyoake and former Governor-Generals.

In the 2008 New Year Honours, Kay was appointed a Companion of the New Zealand Order of Merit for services to art and military history.

He lived in Pukerua Bay. Kay died on 7 April 2017.

Paintings by Kay are held in public collections, including at Museum of New Zealand Te Papa Tongarewa, the Alexander Turnbull Library, and the National Collection of War Art at Archives New Zealand.
