= Dorothy Freed =

New Zealand author, composer and music historian

Dorothy Whitson Freed

Dorothy Whitson Freed MNZM (10 February 1919 – 1 April 2000) was a New Zealand author, composer, and music historian. She made significant contributions to the field of music librarians, and authored several books and articles regarding musical information and resources in New Zealand.

== Early life and family ==
Freed was born in Dunedin, New Zealand. Her father was James Gerald Stokely Doorly, a mariner and Antarctic explorer, musician, and author, and her mother was Forrestina Muriel Whitson. She was the younger of two daughters.

Early in her childhood, her family moved from New Zealand to Williamstown, a suburb of Melbourne, Australia. She completed her public education in Melbourne, before returning to New Zealand in 1936, when she was 17. In New Zealand, she found work in a secretarial and media role. She married her husband William Ian Freed in 1940, and together they had three children. Neither wanted marriage, but wed out of necessity after a casual affair resulted in pregnancy and the two failed to find an abortionist. The marriage was unhappy and the two eventually separated.

== Education ==
While Freed was raising her three children, she enrolled at Victoria University College to study composition. She studied under Douglas Lilburn, and graduated with a Bachelor of Music in composition in 1958, at the age of 39. In 1959, she qualified and began her career as a librarian in Wellington. She also underwent additional compositional training from 1964 to 1966, when she travelled to London and studied with composers Peter Racine Fricker and Elisabeth Rutyens.

== Career ==
From the start of her tenure as a librarian in 1959 to her retirement in 1986, Freed worked tirelessly as a music librarian, as well as an advocate for other New Zealand composers. As part of her work, she helped to found SOUNZ, the Centre For New Zealand Music, which is an online library that contains a large selection of scores, CDs, books, and resources. This library also contains biographical information about composers, helping to create a comprehensive database for the preservation of New Zealand music.

In addition, she founded the New Zealand division of the International Association of Music Librarians in 1982, and then served as its president. The association holds annual board conferences, launches collaborative projects between library branches, and publishes journals, which all help to strengthen the library community in New Zealand.

== Awards and recognition ==
In 1958, Freed won the New Zealand Broadcasting Service/Australasian Performing Right Association (APRA) Award for a New Zealand song. She also won the Phillip Neill Memorial Prize in composition, an award seeking to acknowledge the compositional accomplishments of students in New Zealand. In 1980, she was again recognised by APRA for outstanding services to music. She was awarded a Lilburn Trust Grant for services to music librarianship and music in New Zealand in 1991.

In the 1998 Queen's Birthday Honours, Freed was appointed a Member of the New Zealand Order of Merit, for services to music.

== Legacy ==
Freed left behind two personal memoirs, written towards the end of her life. “A Grandmother’s Story” was written for her granddaughters, and follows her personal account of her early life, her marriage, her time at the University of Wellington, and her career as a musician and librarian. The other memoir, “I Seem To Have Forgotten The Elephants”, contains 32 shorter memoirs from various parts of her life. She never sought to publish her memoirs, but they are available on her personal website, which is maintained by Freed’s grandniece.

== Works ==
Selected works include:

- A Farewell, for baritone or mezzo-soprano and piano
- A Night Full of Nothing, for male voice and piano
- A Nursery Tale, (Goldilocks and the Five Bears) for brass quintet and narrator
- Aquarius March, for brass band
- Change, for mezzo-soprano and piano
- Deserted Beach, for soprano and string quintet
- Diversion for Ten Brass Instruments, for brass ensemble
- Down the Long, Long Trail, for four solo voices, violin, cello, piano and drums
- Fair and Fair and Twice as Fair, for soprano, tenor and string trio
- Good Woman of Szechuan, for flute
- How Should I Your True Love Know? for voice and piano
- I Sing of a Maiden, for SATB choir
- Jenny Kissed Me, for SATB choir
- Kowhai, for voice and piano
- Lament for Te Wano, for SATB choir
- Leisure, for voice and piano
- Little Red Hoodingride, for narrator, piano, drums and horn
- Mary Had a Baby, for four-part choir with soloist
- Mortal Love, for SATB choir
- My true love hath my heart, for voice and piano
- Night Song, for baritone and piano
- Night Song, for medium voice and piano
- O Mistress Mine, for voice and piano
- Old Hungarian Folksong, for SATB choir
- Phyllis, for SATB choir
- Prelude, for piano
- Rondo, for piano
- Sounds and Winds of Wellington, for narrator and chamber ensemble
- String Quartet No. 1, for string quartet
- String Quartet No. 2, for string quartet
- Suicide Deferred, for voice, two pianos, percussion and cello
- Suite for String Orchestra, for string orchestra
- Sunflowers, for voice and piano
- The Bargain, for voice and piano
- The Chinese Terracotta Soldiers, for piano
- The Circle, for piano
- The Diva, for soprano and piano
- The Friendly Beasts, for three-part treble choir with soloist
- The Golden Willowtree, for solo or unison voices and piano
- The Pomegranate Tree, for voice and piano
- The Sea Child, for alto (or mezzo-soprano) and piano (text: Katherine Mansfield)
- The Sun has Spread his Shining Wings, for medium voice (mezzo or baritone) and piano
- Through a Glass Darkly, for oboe, clarinet and three narrators
- Tom's A-Cold, for baritone or medium voice and piano
- Turn Your Face to Mine, for medium voice (baritone or mezzo) and piano
- Variations for Woodwind Quintet, for woodwind quintet
- Variations on a Fanfare, for orchestra
- War With the Weeds, for baritone and piano
- Wellington Letter, for flute, two clarinets, viola and narrator
- Whence comes this rush of wings afar? for four-part women's choir
- Wish, for voice and piano
- Woodwind Quartet, for woodwind quartet
