= Ros Vallings =

New Zealand doctor

Rosamund Vallings MNZM is a medical doctor, known as one of the leading authorities on Chronic Fatigue Syndrome (ME/CFS) in New Zealand.

== Career ==
Vallings has run a medical practice in Howick, Auckland, since 1966. With most patients having ME/CFS and related conditions, the practice started specialising in the illness, and Vallings became known as an expert.

Vallings was involved with managing and diagnosing patients who had been referred by general practitioners and specialists from around New Zealand, but retired at the end of Jan 2022. She runs seminars for both patients and practitioners, and has produced an educational booklet and a number of information sheets to help with the understanding and management of the complex symptoms of ME/CFS. Other doctors at her practice continue to treat the condition.

In 2011, Vallings was one of the authors of the case definition for ME/CFS, entitled "Myalgic Encephalomyelitis: International Consensus Criteria".

Vallings has served the ME/CFS and medical communities voluntarily in a number of roles. These have included: assistant medical director of the Auckland Family Planning Association; medical adviser to the Breast Cancer Support Service; board member of the Macleans College; member of the International Association for Chronic Fatigue Syndrome/Myalgic Encephalomyelitis (IACFS/ME, formerly IACFS); editorial board member of the International Journal of CFS; president of the New Zealand Society of Hypnosis; and as past president and ongoing (as of 2012) medical advisor to the Associated New Zealand ME Society (ANZMES).

== Awards ==
- 2008: Membership of the New Zealand Order of Merit for services to CFS/ME in the 2008 New Year's Honours
- 2016: Nelson Gantz Clinicians Award, received at the IACFS Conference held in Florida, United States, on 30 October 2016

== Publications ==
=== Books ===
- 2012: Chronic Fatigue Syndrome/ME: Symptoms, Diagnosis, Treatment.
- 2015: Managing ME/CFS: A Guide for Young People.
- 2017: The Pocket Guide to Chronic Fatigue Syndrome/ME: Key Facts and Tips for Improved Health.

=== Articles ===
- August 2011: Myalgic encephalomyelitis: International Consensus Criteria.
- Sept 2011: AACFS 7th International Conference.
- December 2011: Hypnosis in the Management of Chronic Fatigue Syndrome.
- December 2011: Report on the Second World Congress on Chronic Fatigue Syndrome and Related Disorders.
- April 2017: Cytokine Inhibition in Patients With Chronic Fatigue Syndrome: A Randomized Trial.
- June 2017: Myalgic Encephalomyelitis/Chronic Fatigue Syndrome Diagnosis and Management in Young People: A Primer.
