= Allan Potts (athletics) =

New Zealand athletics coach

Allan Potts ONZM
Personal information
- Born: Allan Matthew Potts; 25 September 1934 Oamaru, New Zealand
- Died: 8 May 2014 (aged 79) Hastings, New Zealand
- Spouse: Sylvia Mildred Oxenham (m. 1965; died 1999)

Sport
- Sport: Athletics

Achievements and titles
- National finals: 10 mile road race champion (1964)

Allan Matthew Potts ONZM (25 September 1934 – 8 May 2014) was a New Zealand athlete, athletics coach and administrator. He was the New Zealand 10-mile champion in 1964 and coached his wife, Sylvia, a middle-distance athlete of the 1960s and 1970s. He was the track and field coach for the New Zealand team at the 1992 Olympic Games in Barcelona, and served as president of Athletics New Zealand from 2002 to 2003.

In the 1998 Queen's Birthday Honours, Potts was appointed an Officer of the New Zealand Order of Merit, for services to athletics.
