= Ken Stevens (businessman) =

New Zealand business executive

Sir Ken Stevens KNZM
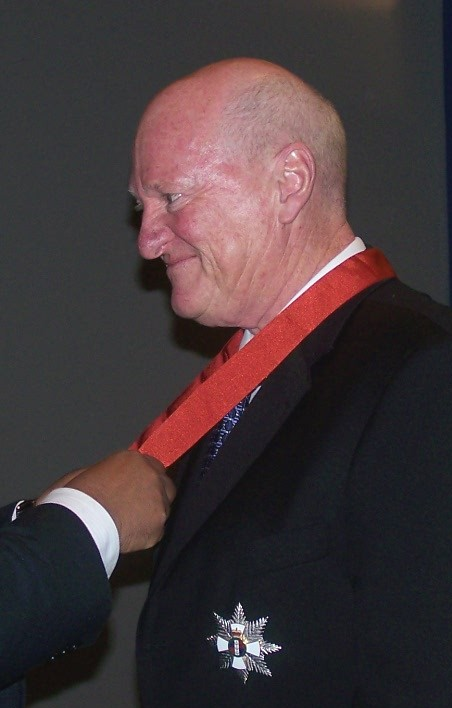
- Stevens in 2008
- Born: Kenneth Allen Stevens; 1943 or 1944 (age 80–81)
- Occupations: Engineer; businessman
- Known for: Founder of Glidepath

Sir Kenneth Allen Stevens KNZM (born 1943 or 1944) is a New Zealand businessman. He founded baggage handling technology company Glidepath in 1972.

In the 2008 New Year Honours, Stevens was appointed a Distinguished Companion of the New Zealand Order of Merit, for services to exporting. In 2009, following the restoration of titular honours by the New Zealand government, he accepted redesignation as a Knight Companion of the New Zealand Order of Merit. In 2012, he was inducted as a "flying Kiwi" into the HiTech hall of fame. Stevens was inducted into the New Zealand Business Hall of Fame in 2020.
