= Northern Southland College =

Location
- 51 Maria Street, Lumsden, New Zealand; 45.7446°S 168.4484°E

Information
- Type: State Co-Ed Secondary (Year 7-13)
- Established: 1976
- Ministry of Education Institution no.: 395
- Chairman: Jonny Elder
- Principal: Peter Wilkinson
- Enrolment: 213 (July 2026)
- Socio-economic decile: 7O
- Website: nsc.school.nz

Northern Southland College (NSC) is a secondary school for students from year 7 to 13 in Lumsden, New Zealand.

NSC has students from Mossburn, Balfour and Garston. Most pupils travel to school via bus.

== Curriculum ==
Northern Southland College uses National Certificate of Educational Achievement (NCEA) based assessments; the "credits" earned from these exams go towards the student's NCEA qualification.
