= Annah Stretton =

New Zealand fashion designer

Annah Stretton MNZM
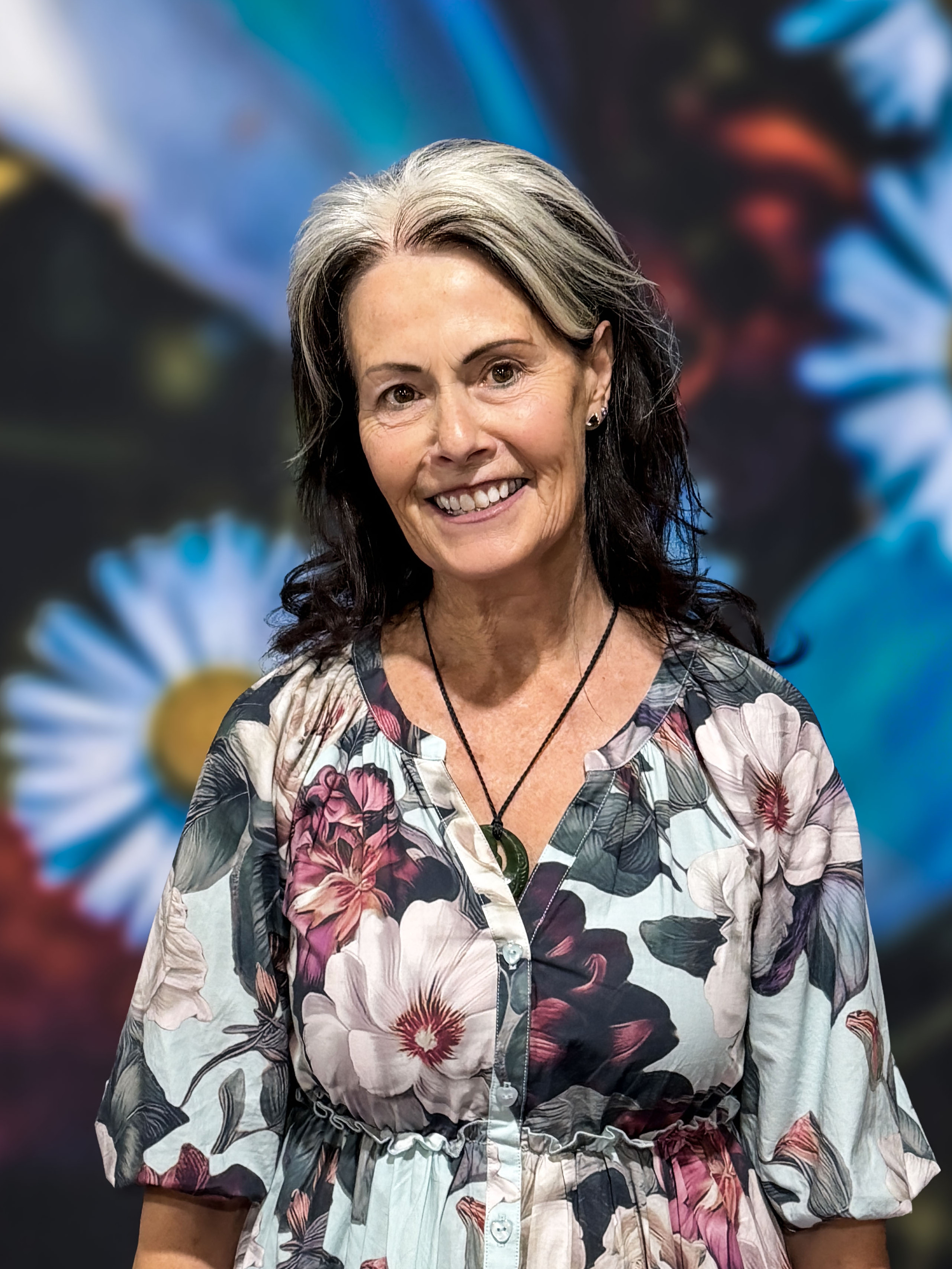
- Stretton in 2025
- Born: December 1959 (age 66); Hawkes Bay, New Zealand
- Occupations: Fashion designer; entrepreneur; philanthropist
- Website: annahstretton.co.nz

Annah Stretton MNZM (born December 1959) is a New Zealand fashion designer, entrepreneur, publisher and philanthropist.

Stretton has twice been nominated for New Zealander of the Year, in 2017 and 2019. In 2008, she was awarded the New Zealand Order of Merit in the New Year's honours for services to fashion, business, and community.

== Early life and ducation ==
Stretton grew up in Hawkes Bay, New Zealand where she attended Karamu High School. She enrolled in art school and then pursued a degree in accountancy.

In 2023, Stretton was pursuing a Masters in Maori and Indigenous Affairs at the University of Waikato.

== Career ==
Stretton launched her fashion label from a dairy farm in Morrinsville. At its peak, the company expanded to 34 stores across New Zealand and Australia. During the COVID-19 pandemic, the brand moved into accessories and homeware.

In 2004, Stretton debuted on the World of Wearable Art (WOW) stage with Beauty and the Beast. The piece was also displayed for several years at the World of Wearable Art and Classic Car Museum in Nelson. At the 2005 WOW, Stretton entered a piece entitled Reluctant Bride: Bird of Prey. In 2006, she entered Black Tie followed by her 2007 entry, Queen of Hearts.

Stretton showed at New Zealand Fashion Week (NZFW) between 2002 and 2015 as well as appearing a number of times at Australian Fashion Week.

== Philanthropy ==
In 2014, Stretton set up Reclaim Another Woman (RAW), a reintegrative residential programme to support women leaving prison. RAW has been recognised by the New Zealand Department of Corrections for its rehabilitation framework. In 2018, Stretton expanded the programme to RAW on the Inside at Auckland Regional Women's Corrections Facility.

Stretton was invited by the chief executive of Te Whakaruruhau (Waikato Women's Refuge), New Zealand's first Māori women's refuge, to join the board. Stretton has been the chair of the Waikato Women's Refuge board since 2015.

Stretton was on the True Colours Children's Health Trust Board between 2004 and 2009, purchasing a property in the Waikato for the trust's work and creating the trust's annual fundraising event, The Long Lunch.

Between 2015 and 2020, Stretton was a UNICEF NZ board member.

== Awards and recognition ==
- In 2005, Stretton received the Ernst & Young NZ Entrepreneur of the Year Award. (Retail, Consumer and Industrial Products)
- In 2006, Honorary Master of Arts in Design, Wintec.
- Stretton was chair of Fashion Industry New Zealand FINZ from 2006 – 2008.
- In 2008 Stretton was recognised for her contribution to the community with the Zonta Woman of the Biennium Award.
- Stretton was awarded New Zealand Order of Merit for services to fashion/business/community in 2008.
- In 2009, Stretton was the recipient of the Veuve Clicquot business award.
- In 2015, Stretton was awarded the ASB Social Entrepreneur of the Year award for her work with RAW.
- In 2017, Stretton was recognised for RAW with the Not For Profit Award at the Waikato Business Awards.
- Stretton was a semi finalist for New Zealander of the Year Awards in 2018 & 2019.
- In 2019, Stretton was a recipient for the Zonta 50 Women of Achievement Awards.

== Works ==
- From Rag Trade to Mag Trade: The Business of Annah Stretton. 2007. Stretton Publishing. Morrinsville, NZ. ISBN 978-0473126629
- Wise Heart: 10 strategies for success in business & life was published by Random House in 2010.
- Rock the Boat! 2013. Stretton Publishing. Morrinsville, NZ. ISBN 9780473246334.
- The RAW truth: an angel on your shoulder. 2019. Stretton Publishing. Morrinsville, NZ. ISBN 9780473475956. The book recounts the experiences of women in the RAW programme and Stretton's involvement in the initiative, aiming to challenge perceptions of recidivist offenders in New Zealand.
- Grit Before Grace. 2022. Stretton Publishing. Morrinsville, NZ. ISBN 9780473613303.
