= Hewitt Humphrey =

New Zealand broadcaster

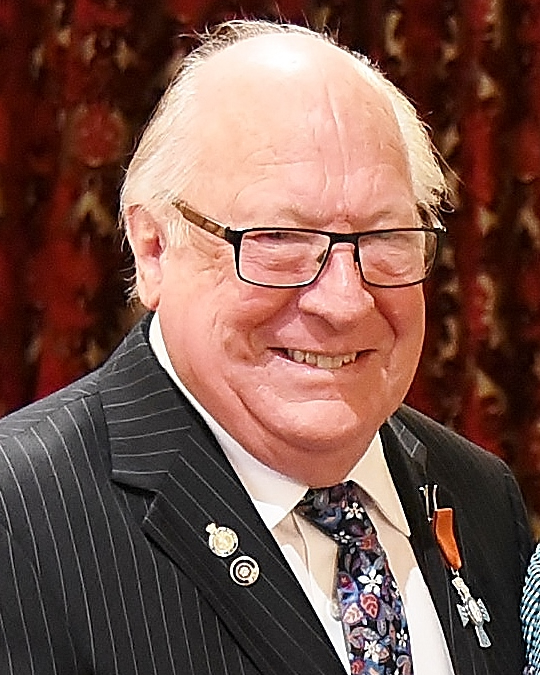
Humphrey in 2017

Hewitt Royden Humphrey MNZM QSM JP (born 19 September 1946, in Levin, New Zealand) is a former New Zealand broadcaster. He is best known as a radio newsreader on the New Zealand Broadcasting Corporation from 1965 to 1975, as well as his time on Radio New Zealand. He worked with RNZ from its establishment in 1975 until he retired as Presentation Standards Manager in 2015. As a radio newsreader, Humphrey read the news minutes after men first walked on the moon.

He was appointed a Justice of the Peace in 1996 and a Visiting Justice under the Corrections Act in 2011.

Humphrey was educated at Levin School and then Horowhenua College.
