= New Zealand Railways Department =

Government agency (1880–1982)

New Zealand Government Railways
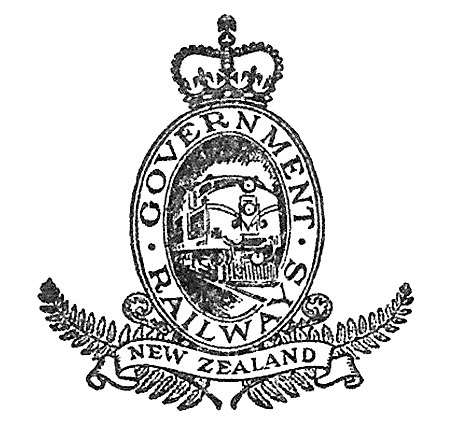

Overview
- Headquarters: Wellington
- Reporting mark: NZGR
- Locale: New Zealand
- Dates of operation: 1880–1982
- Predecessor: Public Works Department (rail operations, acquired 1880); Port Chalmers Railway Company (acquired 1880); Waimea Plains Railway (acquired 1886); Thames Valley and Rotorua Railway Company (acquired 1886); New Zealand Midland Railway Company (acquired 1891); Wellington and Manawatu Railway Company (acquired 1908)
- Successor: New Zealand Railways Corporation

Technical
- Track gauge: 1,067 mm (3 ft 6 in)
- Length: 1,828 km (1,136 mi) (1880); 5,696 km (3,539 mi) (1952, peak); 4,799 km (2,982 mi) (1981)

The New Zealand Railways Department, NZR or NZGR (New Zealand Government Railways) and often known as the "Railways", was a government department charged with owning and maintaining New Zealand's railway infrastructure and operating the railway system. The department was created in 1880 and was corporatised on 1 April 1982 into the New Zealand Railways Corporation. Originally, railway construction and operation took place under the auspices of the former provincial governments and some private railways, before all of the provincial operations came under the central Public Works Department. The role of operating the rail network was subsequently separated from that of the network's construction. From 1895 to 1993 there was a responsible Minister, the Minister of Railways. He was often also the Minister of Public Works.

Apart from four brief experiments with independent boards, NZR remained under direct ministerial control for most of its history.

== History ==
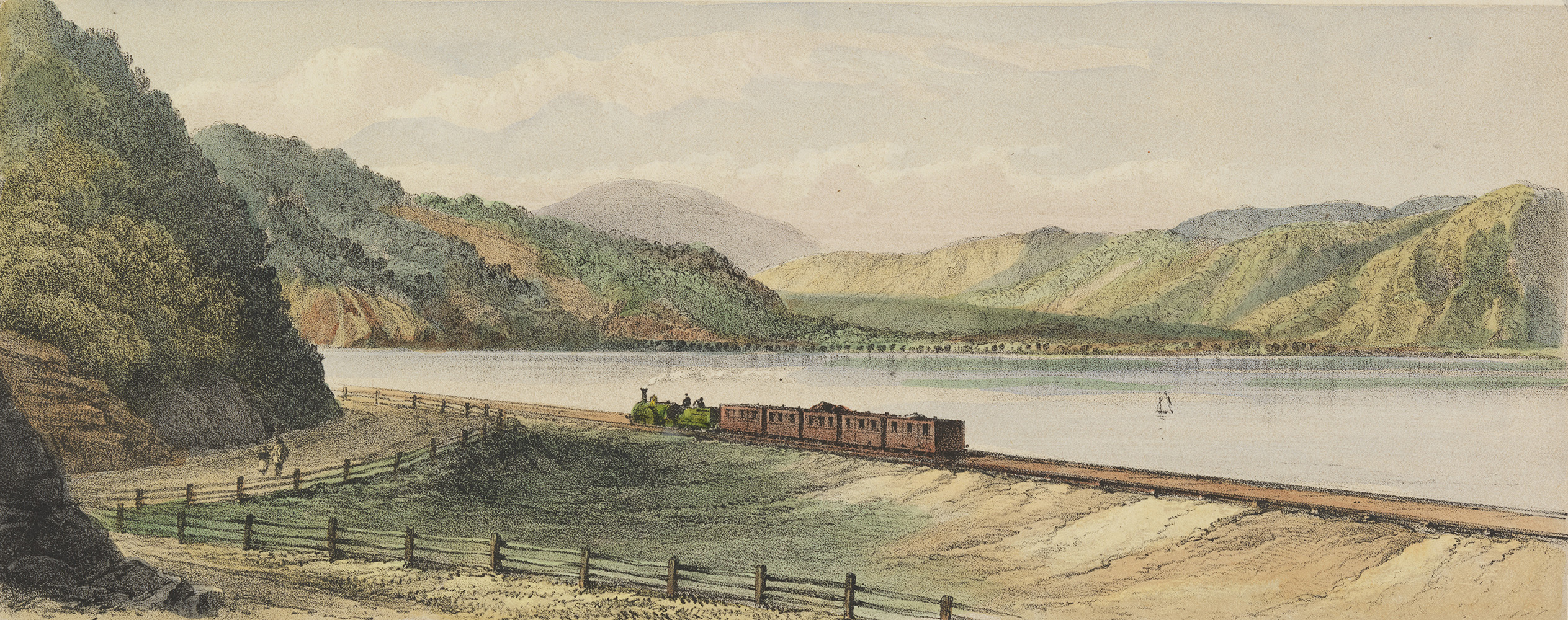
Engraving of a locomotive and carriages moving along the side of the Wellington Harbour toward the Hutt Valley, c.1875

Originally, New Zealand's railways were constructed by provincial governments and private firms. The largest provincial operation was the Canterbury Provincial Railways, which opened the first public railway at Ferrymead on 1 December 1863. During The Vogel Era of the late 1860s to the 1870s, railway construction by central government expanded greatly, from just 80 kilometres (50 miles) in 1869 to 1,900 kilometres (1,200 miles) in 1880.

Following the abolition of the provinces in 1877, the Public Works Department took over the various provincial railways. Since the Public Works Department was charged with constructing new railway lines (among other public works) the day to day railway operations were transferred into a new government department on the recommendation of a parliamentary select committee. At the time 1,828 kilometres (1,136 miles) of railway lines were open for traffic, 546 km (339 mi) in the North Island and 1,283 km (797 mi) in the South Island, mainly consisting of the 630 km (390 mi) Main South Line from the port of Lyttelton to Bluff.

=== Formation and early years ===
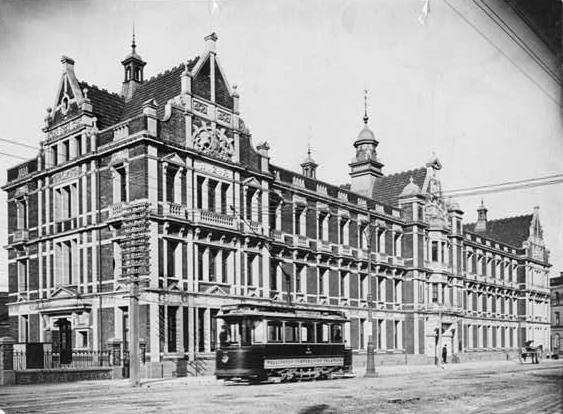
New Zealand Railways Department Head Office, Wellington, photographed circa 1905–1908 by J N Taylor.

The Railways Department was formed in 1880 during the premiership of Sir John Hall. That year, the private Port Chalmers Railway Company Limited was acquired by the department and new workshops at Addington opened. Ironically, the first few years of NZR were marked by the Long Depression, which led to great financial constraint on the department. As a result, the central government passed legislation to allow for the construction of more private railways. A Commission, ordered by Hall, had in 1880 reviewed 85 proposed and partly-constructed railway lines in the colony, and it proposed postponing 21 projects and recommended against proceeding with 29 others. The Commissioners were especially critical of the colony's existing railways' inability to generate sufficient income to pay the interest on the loans that had funded their construction:

The extent to which this fatal mistake has been made may be in some degree realized by a comparison of the relations between railways and population in this and other countries. In Great Britain the amount of population to each mile of railway is 1,961; in the United States, 580; in New South Wales, 1,108; in Victoria, 924; while in New Zealand we have only a population of 362 to each mile of railway already made.

In August 1881 the Railways Construction and Land Act was passed, allowing joint-stock companies to build and run private railways, as long as they were built to the government's standard rail gauge of 1,067 mm (3 ft 6 in) and connected with the government railway lines. The Act had the effect of authorising the Wellington and Manawatu Railway Company to build the Wellington-Manawatu Line.

In 1877 the first American locomotives were purchased; the NZR K class (1877) from Rogers, followed by the NZR T class of 1879 from Baldwin.

The most important construction project for NZR at this time was the central section of the North Island Main Trunk. Starting from Te Awamutu on 15 April 1885, the section—including the famous Raurimu Spiral—was not completed for another 23 years.

The economy gradually improved and in 1895 the Liberal Government of Premier Richard Seddon appointed Alfred Cadman as the first Minister of Railways. The Minister appointed a General Manager for the railways, keeping the operation under tight political control. Apart from four periods of government-appointed commissions (1889–1894, 1924–1928, 1931–1936 and 1953–1957), this system remained in place until the department was corporatised in 1982. In 1895, patronage had reached 3.9M passengers per annum and 2.048M tonnes.

NZR produced its first New Zealand-built steam locomotive in 1889; the W class built in the Addington Railway Workshops.

Along with opening new lines, NZR began acquiring a number of the private railways which had built railway lines around the country. It acquired the Waimea Plains Railway Company in 1886. At the same time, a protracted legal battle began with the New Zealand Midland Railway Company, which was only resolved in 1898. The partially completed Midland line was not handed over to NZR until 1900. By that time, 3,200 km (2,000 mi) of railway lines were open for traffic. The acquisition in 1908 of the Wellington and Manawatu Railway Company and its railway line marked the completion of the North Island Main Trunk from Wellington to Auckland. A new locomotive class, the X class, was introduced in 1909 for traffic on the line. The X class was the most powerful locomotive at the time. Gold rushes led to the construction of the Thames Branch, opening in 1898.

In 1906 the Dunedin railway station was completed, architect George Troup. A. L. Beattie became Chief Mechanical Officer in April 1900. Beattie designed the famous A class, the Q class (the first "Pacific" type locomotive in the world), and many other locomotive classes.

NZR's first bus operation began on 1 October 1907, between Culverden on the Waiau Branch and Waiau Ferry in Canterbury. By the 1920s NZR was noticing a considerable downturn in rail passenger traffic on many lines due to increasing ownership of private cars, and from 1923 it began to co-ordinate rail passenger services with private bus services. The New Zealand Railways Road Services branch was formed to operate bus services.

In 1911 tenders for bookstalls were being advertised for 33 main stations – Auckland, Frankton Junction, Rotorua. Paeroa, Taumarunui, Ohakune, Taihape, Marton, Feilding, Palmerston North, Levin, Wellington Thorndon and Lambton, Masterton, Woodville, Dannevirke. Waipukurau. Hastings, Napier, New Plymouth, Stratford, Hāwera, Aramoho, Whanganui, Nelson, Christchurch, Ashburton, Timaru, Oamaru, Dunedin, Milton, Gore, and Invercargill.

By 1912, patronage had reached 13.4M passengers per annum (a 242% increase since 1895) and 5.9M tonnes of freight (a 188% increase since 1895).

In 1913, damages of £15 were awarded against New Zealand Railways to S. J. Gibbons by the Supreme Court in a precedent-setting case; for damages to a car that hit a train at a level crossing: see Cliff Road railway station.

==== Pre-1914 coaches ====
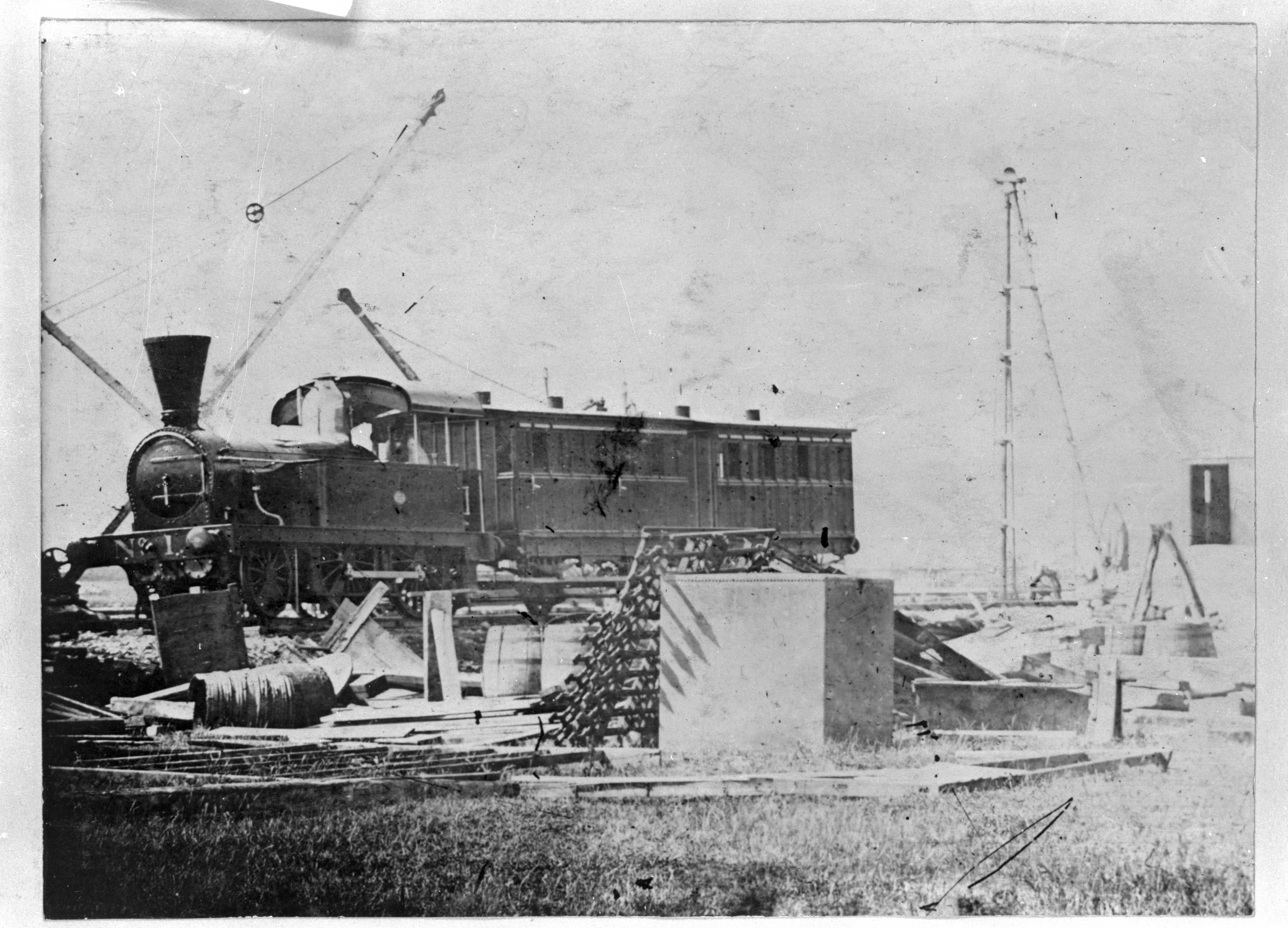
Canterbury Railways No. 1 "Pilgrim" and carriages 1863-78

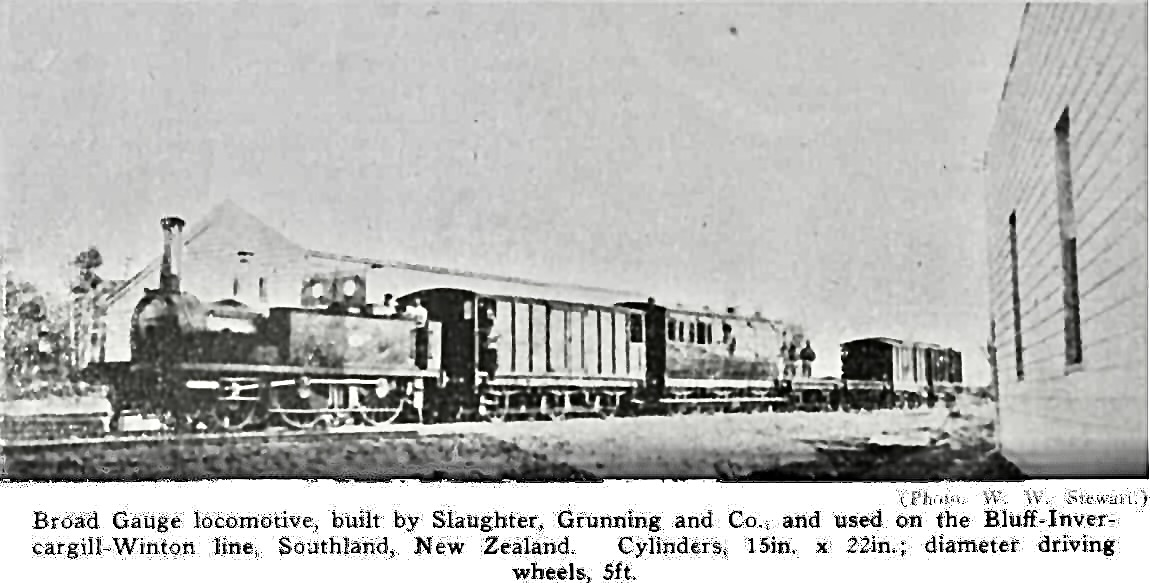
Southland standard gauge train - Bluff-Invercargill-Winton 1867-75

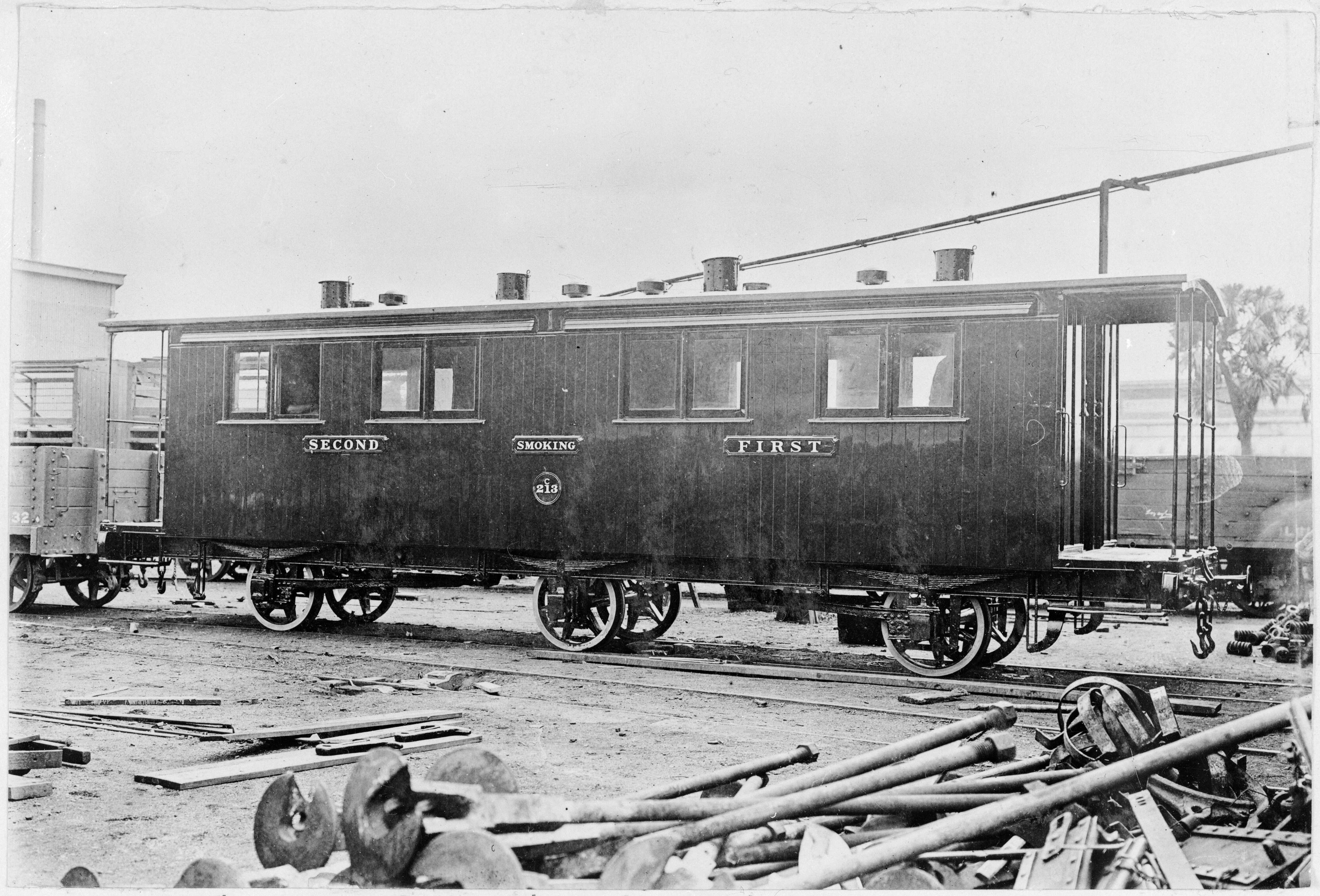
Class C 213, at the Dunedin Exhibition, 1925

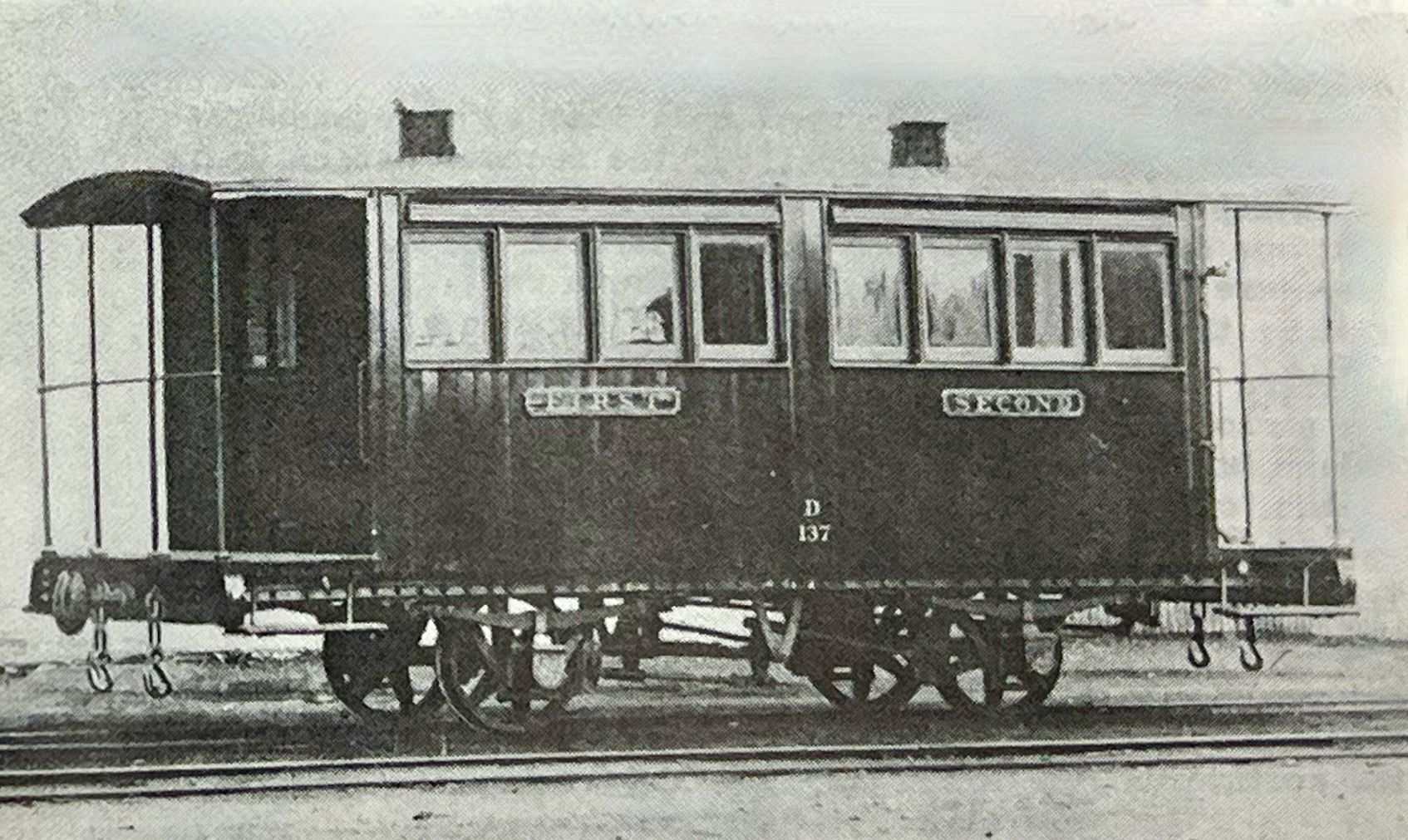
Class D 137 in a NZR publicity photo

In 1863 Canterbury Provincial Railways had the first 4 coaches in the country, two 1st and two 2nd class, built by W. Williams, Melbourne. From 1867 to 1875 the Bluff-Invercargill-Winton lline was standard gauge. In 1867 one article mentioned that carriages for the Great South lines were imported from the Metropolitan Carriage Company. When those lines were converted to 3 ft 6in gauge about 1875, new stock was needed.

31 carriages were landed from Britain in 1873. They generally arrived in packing cases, but that didn't always protect them, resulting in claims against the builders. Some were built by Oldbury Railway Carriage & Wagon Company. In 1873 A & G Price built 3 1st class and 7 2nd class carriages for £2,217 at their Onehunga works, using kauri and imported axles. In later years there were complaints that coaches could as well be built locally, though in 1876 it had been claimed the quality was poorer. In 1875 the Kaipara and Riverhead railway had 6 English built coaches. In 1880 the Auckland-Waikato line was using 30 C Class (31 ft (9.4 m) long with 32 seats) & 20 D Class (20 ft (6.1 m) long with 16 seats) carriages. 1st class cars had cushioned, leather-covered, longitudinal seats, with coir mats on the floor, though later woven flax was used. Smoking compartments had brass spitoons screwed to the floor. 2nd class seats were straight backed and wooden with no cushions. All doors were sliding with the doors kept locked between 1st and 2nd class compartments, as were the gates between cars. No heating or toilets were provided. Colza oil lamps hung through holes in the roof. The cars had straight sides, low flat-top roofs, narrow 6 ft 10 in (2.08 m) bodies and small, high, drop down windows. In 1887 67 carriages were built locally. Until the 1880s trains were loose coupled. By 1900 the last 6 of the 1870s and 1880s coaches had been scrapped, or transferred away from the main lines.

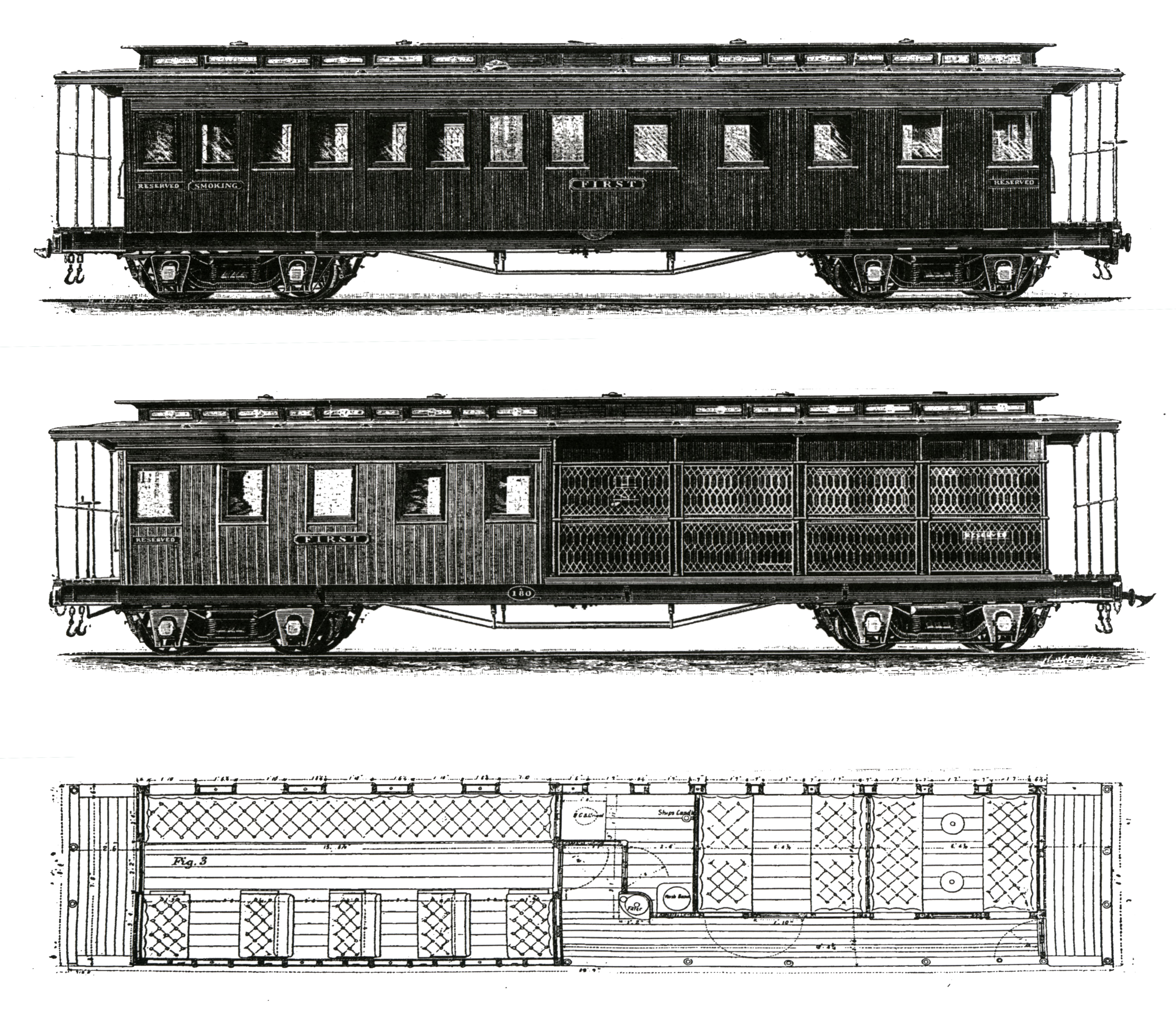
Birdcage car

Bogies were first used for coaches built at the Auckland Railway Worksheds in 1876. 44 ft (13 m) long bogie coaches, built in Christchurch and Auckland, were introduced from 1884 to give a smoother ride. Birdcage (or gallery) bogie carriages, built at Addington, with toilets, were introduced to the Marton–New Plymouth line in 1889. Similar coaches were built at Newmarket for the opening of the Napier line in 1890. Their bodies were 42 ft (13 m) long, 8 ft (2.4 m) wide and 8.5 ft (2.6 m) high, built of kauri, mangeao, puriri, rewarewa, totara and rimu, with reversible seats and linoleum floors. Gas lighting was first trialled in 1879, but didn't come into widespread use until Pintsch gas lighting replaced oil lamps from 1895, initially between Hurunui (from 1905 renamed Ethelton) and Bluff. The cost was claimed to be reduced from ¾d per light per hour to ¼d. Pintsch plants were built in Auckland and Wellington in 1897. Westinghouse air brakes were fitted to stock from 1900. 63 American built coaches were imported in 1901 and again there were complaints that they could have been built locally.

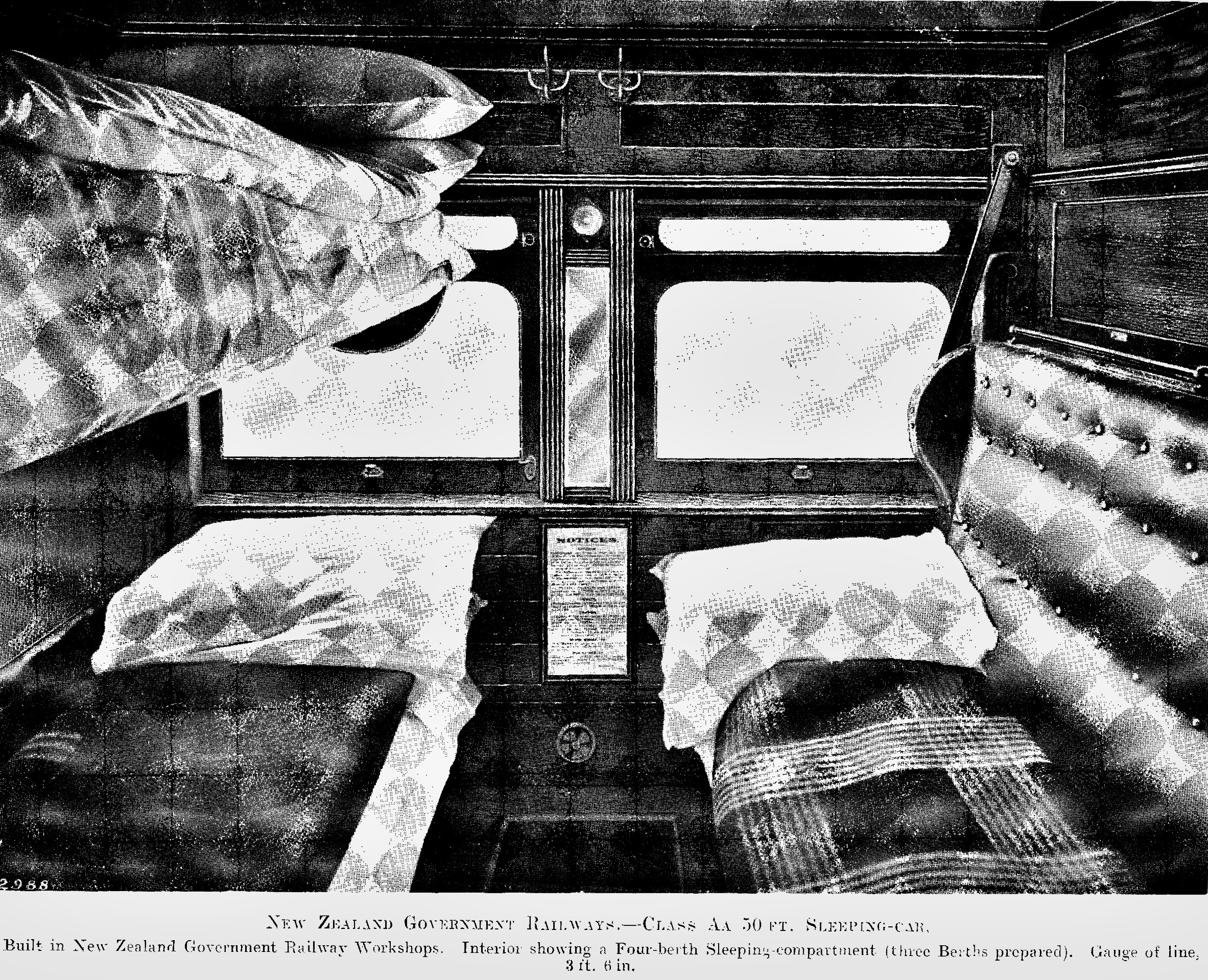
1909 4-berth sleeping car

Until 1908 NZR carriages were small (30 ft (9.1 m) to 44 ft (13 m)), with a few 47.5 ft (14.5 m) long. The great majority were bogie carriages, but 6-wheeled and 4-wheeled cars existed. About 1908 the NZR 50-foot carriage was introduced, initially for the newly completed North Island Main Trunk. NZR had 1,002 carriages on 1 April 1908. On 31 March 1909 it had 1,116 cars. NZR workshops built 58 new 50 ft cars - 24 day cars, 6 sleeping-cars and 4 refreshment cars for NIMT, plus 14 Class A cars and 10 postal cars. Steam heating was provided in the new 50-footers. Previously footwarmers were used. Petone workshops built 8 sleeping cars, 9 ft 3 in (2.82 m) wide, with 20 berths (4 x 4-berth cabins, 2 x 2-berth), or 30 seats, in 6 ft 3 in (1.91 m)-wide compartments.

From 1886 carriages were classed as A for bogie carriages over 30 feet long, Aa for wide coaches, B for 30 foot bogies, C for 6 wheelers and D for 4 wheelers.

===== Preserved early coaches =====
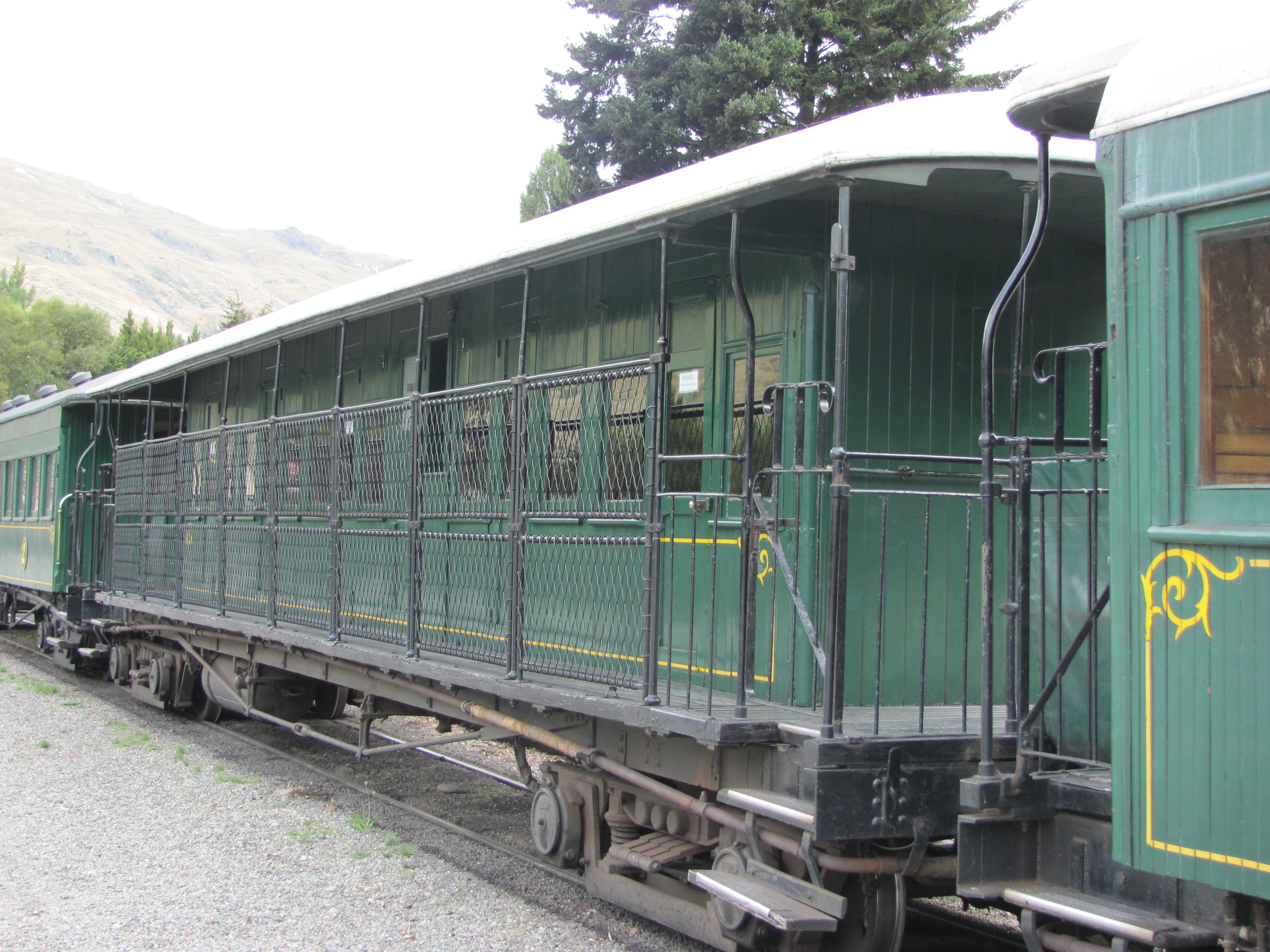
Kingston Flyer birdcage car

Preserved pre-1914 carriages include -

Class	No.	Type	Length	Built	Builder	Location
A	47	birdcage	47.5 ft (14.5 m)	1891	Addington	Ferrymead
A	84	composite	44 ft (13 m)	1899	Petone	MOTAT
A	104			1883		Ferrymead
A	199			1883		Lumsden
A	222			1880		Ferrymead
A	255	composite		1884	Addington	Remutaka Incline
A	302	gum digger	44 ft (13 m)	1884	Petone	MOTAT
A	433	gum digger	44 ft (13 m)	1885	Newmarket	MOTAT
A	463			1894	Addington	Ferrymead
A	516			1896	Addington	Ferrymead
A	518			1896	Addington	Ferrymead
A	525			1896		Lumsden
A	531	2nd class car	44 ft (13 m)	1896	Petone	MOTAT
A	557			1899	Petone	MOTAT
A	585			1900		Ferrymead
A	595	birdcage		1900		Kingston Flyer
A	719			1896		Papanui
A	851	2nd class car	47.5 ft (14.5 m)	1904	Petone	MOTAT
Aa	1060	sleeper		1909		Remutaka Incline
Aa	1068	2nd class car	50 ft (15 m)	1908	Petone	MOTAT
Aa	1134			1909	Petone	Glenbrook
Aa	1136	2nd class car	50 ft (15 m)	1909	Petone	MOTAT
A	1161			1911	Newmarket	Glenbrook
A	1162			1911	Newmarket	Glenbrook
A	1177			1912	Addington	Ferrymead
A	1222			1912	Newmarket	Glenbrook
A	1255		47.5 ft (14.5 m)	1913		Kingston Flyer
Aa	1233			1912	Petone	Glenbrook
Aa	1258			1912	Petone	Glenbrook
Aa	1480	dining-car	50 ft (15 m)	1908	Petone	MOTAT
Af	804			1903	Newmarket	Glenbrook
Af	970	composite	47.5 ft (14.5 m)	1907	Newmarket	MOTAT
Af	1182			1911	Newmarket	Glenbrook
C	100			1877		Lumsden
C	275			1877		Ferrymead
C	472	composite	20 ft (6.1 m)	1879	Oldbury	Glenbrook
D	26	composite		1874		Ferrymead
D	137			1877	Oldbury	Ferrymead
WMR A2	42			1905	Thorndon	Silverstream
WMR A2	48			1906	Thorndon	Silverstream
WMR A2	52			1907	Thorndon	Silverstream

=== World War I ===
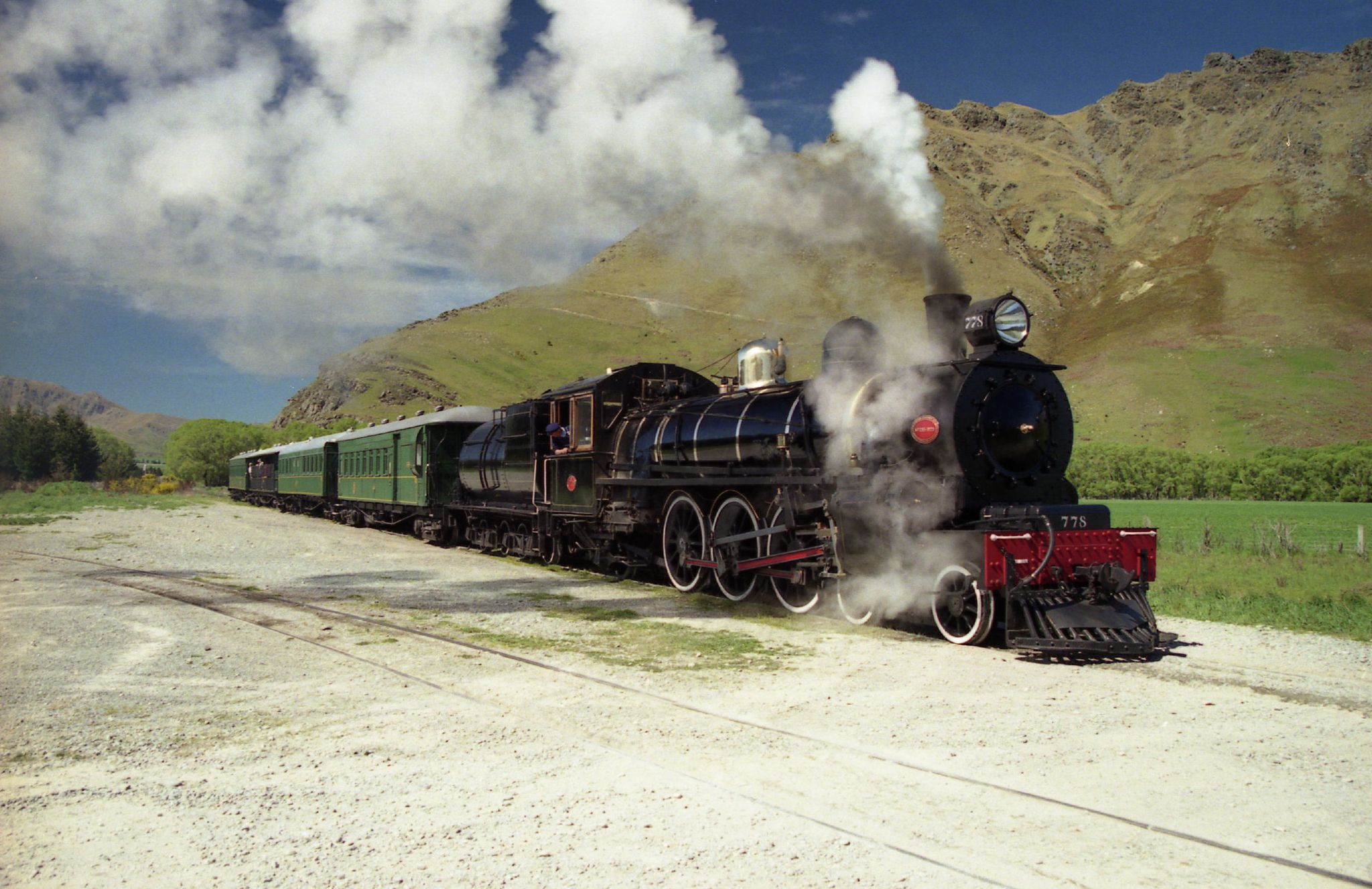
The A^{B} class were introduced in 1915. Over 141 of these locomotives were introduced, from three different builders. Here preserved A^{B} 778 hauls the Kingston Flyer.

The outbreak of World War I in 1914 had a significant impact on the Railways Department. That year the A^{A} class appeared, and the following year the first A^{B} class locomotives were introduced. This class went on to become the most numerous locomotive class in New Zealand history, with several examples surviving into preservation.

The war itself led to a decline in passenger, freight and train miles run but also led to an increase in profitability. In the 1917 Annual Report, a record 5.3% return on investment was made. The war did take its toll on railway services, with dining cars being removed from passenger trains in 1917, replaced by less labour-intensive refreshment rooms at railway stations along the way. As a result, the "scramble for pie and tea at Taihape" became a part of New Zealand folklore.

Non-essential rail services were curtailed as more staff took part in the war effort, and railway workshops were converted for producing military equipment, on top of their existing maintenance and construction work. The war soon affected the supply of coal to the railways. Although hostilities ended in 1918, the coal shortage carried on into 1919 as first miners strikes and then an influenza epidemic cut supplies. As a result, non-essential services remained in effect until the end of 1919. Shortages of spare parts and materials led to severe inflation, and repairs on locomotives being deferred. Similar coal-saving timetable cuts occurred at the end of the next war in 1945 and 1946.

==== Increasing competition and great depression ====
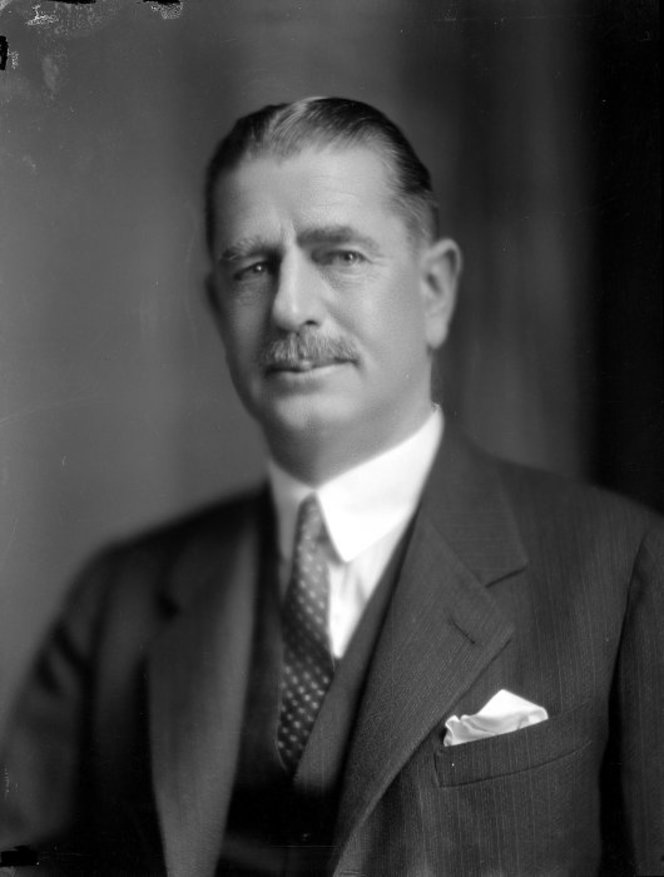
Gordon Coates became Minister of Railways in 1923. His tenure was to have a profound effect on the department.

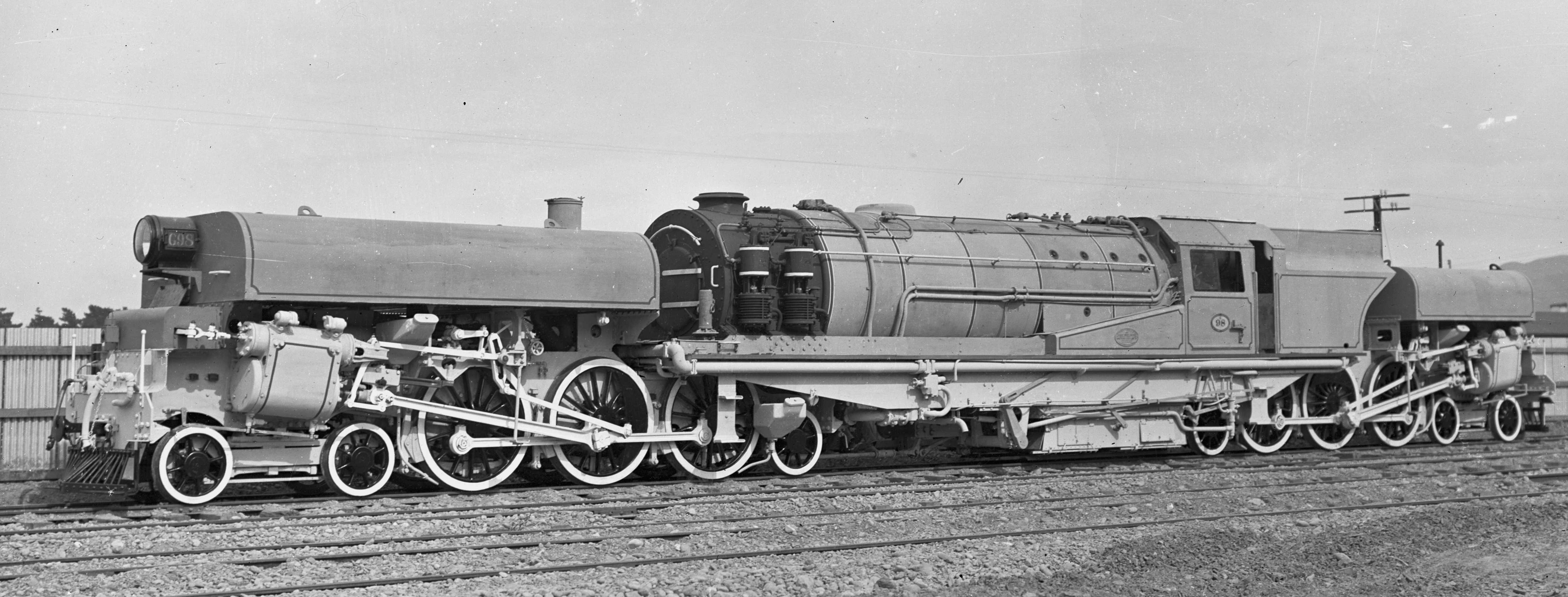
NZR's G class Garratt locomotives failed to live up to expectations.

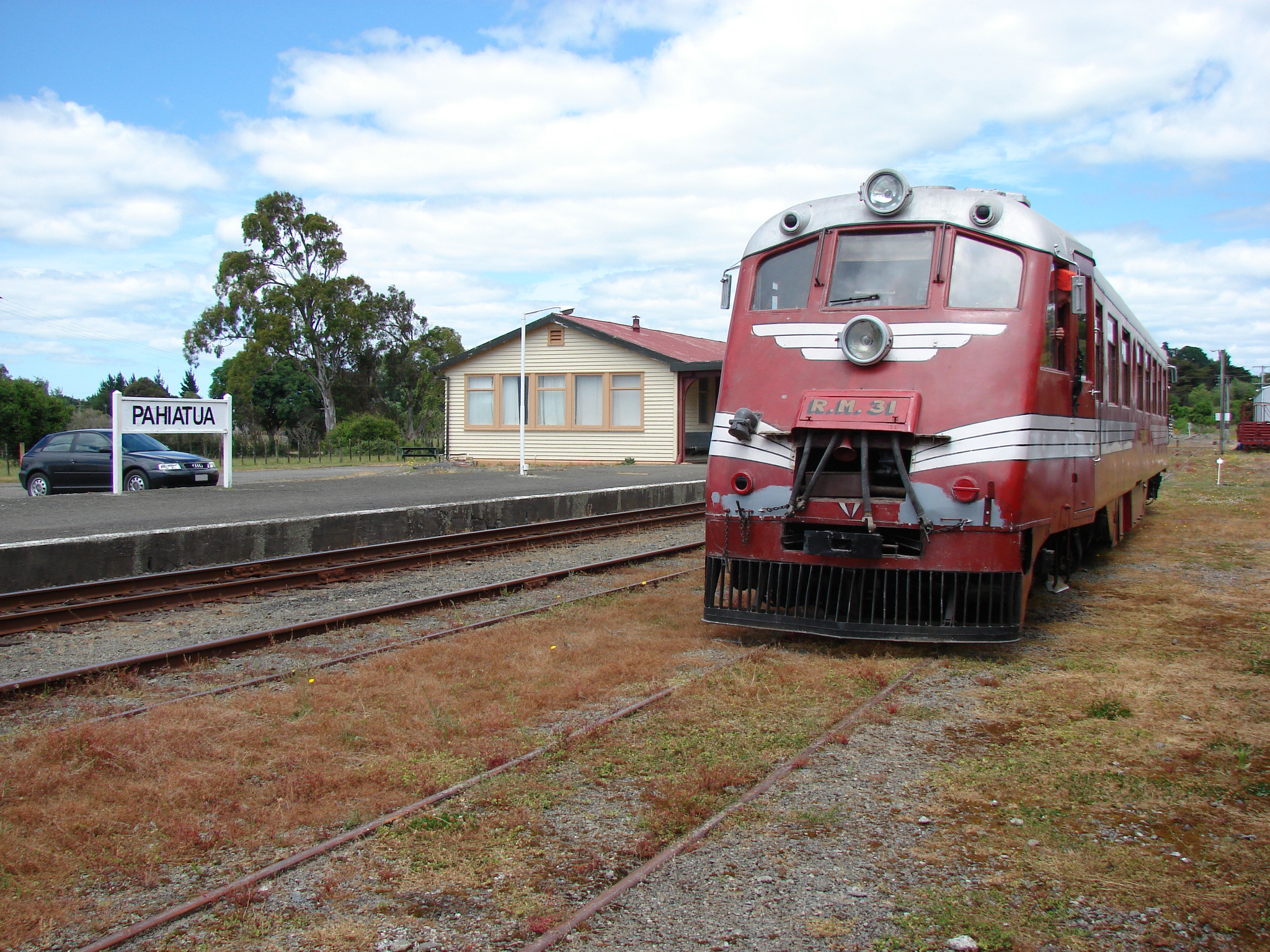
The Standard class railcars were introduced from July 1938. This example, RM 31, is seen at Paihiatua, Wairarapa.

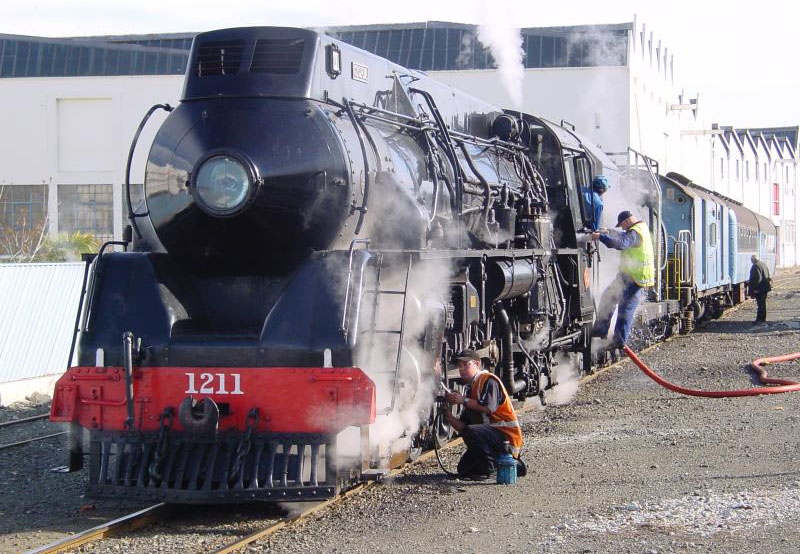
The J class also appeared in 1939. This locomotive, J 1211, survived for preservation.

In 1920 the 3,000-mile (4,800 km) milestone of open railway lines was reached and 15 million passengers were carried by the department. An acute housing shortage following the war led to the creation of Railways Department's Housing Scheme in 1922. The first of the now-iconic railway houses were prefabricated in a factory in Frankton for NZR staff. This scheme was shut down in 1929 as it was considered improper for a government department to compete with private builders.

The Otira Tunnel was completed in 1923, heralding the completion of the Midland Line in the South Island. The tunnel included the first section of railway electrification in New Zealand and its first electric locomotives, the original E^{O} class. The section was electrified at 1,500 V DC, due to the steep grade in the tunnel, and included its own hydro-electric power station. The second section to be electrified by the department was the Lyttelton Line in Christchurch, completed in 1929, at the same voltage and current. This again saw English Electric supply locomotives, the EC class.

Gordon Coates, on 24 October 1922, as Minister of Public Works, during the second reading debate of his Main Highways Act, said, “I say the day will come when it will be found that through the use of motor transport certain railways in New Zealand will be relegated to a secondary place altogether, and probably will be torn up, and we shall have motor traffic taking their place.” Section 12 of that Act allowed for government borrowing and Section 19 required local councils to provide half the cost of road improvements. By setting in place a system of subsidy from ratepayers and taxpayers, whilst requiring railways to make a 3¾% profit (at that rate, interest amounted to over 22% of total earnings), Coates ensured his prophecy came true, as railways gradually became uneconomic. He also encouraged publicity for rail travel.

The following year, Gordon Coates became the Minister of Railways. Coates was an ambitious politician who had an almost "religious zeal" for his portfolio. During the summer of 1923, he spent the entire parliamentary recess inspecting the department's operations. The following year, he put forward a "Programme of Improvements and New Works'".

Coates scheme proposed spending £8 million over 8 years. This was later expanded to £10 million over 10 years. The programme included:

- The Auckland–Westfield deviation of the North Island Main Trunk;
- New marshalling yards at Auckland, Wellington and Christchurch;
- The Milson Deviation of the North Island Main Trunk through Palmerston North;
- The Rimutaka Tunnel under the Rimutaka Ranges in Wellington;
- The Tawa Flat deviation of the North Island Main Trunk out of Wellington;
- Electric lighting;
- New locomotive facilities and
- New signalling systems.

An independent commission, led by Sir Sam Fay and Sir Vincent Raven produced a report known as the "Fay Raven Report" which gave qualified approval to Coates' programme. The reports only significant change was the proposal of a Cook Strait train ferry service between Wellington and Picton, to link the two systems up. Coates went on to become Prime Minister in 1925, an office he held until 1928 when he was defeated at the general election of that year. While the Westfield and Tawa Flat deviations proceeded, the Milson deviation and Rimutaka Tunnel projects remained stalled. The onset of the Great Depression from late 1929 saw these projects scaled back or abandoned. The Westfield deviation was completed in 1930 and the Tawa deviation proceeded at a snail's pace. A number of new lines under construction were casualties, including the Rotorua-Taupo line, approved in July 1928 but abandoned almost a year later due to the depression. An exception was the Stratford–Okahukura Line, finished in 1933.

However, there was criticism that maintenance was being neglected. In the Liberals last year of office in 1912, 140 miles (230 km) of line had been relaid, but that was reduced to 118 in 1913, 104 in 1914, 81 in 1924 and 68 in 1925, during the Reform Government's years.

Once again, growing traffic requirements led to the introduction of a new type of locomotive, the ill-fated G class Garratt locomotives in 1928. Three of the locomotives were introduced for operation on the North Island Main Trunk. They were not well suited to New Zealand conditions: they had overly complex valve gear, were too hot for crews manning them and too powerful for the wagons they were hauling. The failure of this class lead to the introduction of the K class in 1932.

=== Government Railways Board ===
Tough economic conditions and increasing competition from road transport led to calls for regulation of the land transport sector. In 1931 it was claimed half a million tons of freight had been lost to road transport. That year, the department carried 7.2 million passengers per year, down from 14.2 million in 1923. In 1930 a Royal Commission on Railways recommended that land transport should be "co-ordinated" and the following year Parliament passed the Transport Licensing Act 1931. The Act regulated the carriage of goods and entrenched the monopoly the department had on land transport. It set a minimum distance road transport operators could transport goods at 30 miles (48 km) before they had to be licensed. The Act was repealed in 1982.

Alongside these changes, in 1931 the Railways Department was briefly restructured into the Government Railways Board. Another Act of Parliament, the Government Railways Amendment Act 1931 was passed. The Railways Board was independent of the Government of the day and answered to the Minister of Finance. During this period the Prime Minister George Forbes was also Minister of Railways, and Minister of Finance was former Minister of Railways Gordon Coates. The Railways Board was chaired by Herbert Harry Sterling, the former General Manager, and had 10 members from around the country. The Board stopped building on the Dargaville branch, Gisborne line, Main South Line, Nelson Section, Okaihau to Rangiahua line and Westport-Inangahua line. For that it was criticised by Bob Semple, the new Minister of Public Works, in a speech in 1935 and abolished by the First Labour Government in 1936.

In 1933 plans for a new railway station and head office in Wellington were approved, along with the electrification of the Johnsonville Line (then still part of the North Island Main Trunk). The Wellington railway station and Tawa flat deviation were both completed in 1937. As part of attempts by NZR to win back passengers from private motor vehicles, the same year the first 56-foot carriages were introduced.

Garnet Mackley was appointed General Manager in 1933, and worked hard to improve the standard and range of services provided by the department. This included a number of steps to make passenger trains faster, more efficient and cheaper to run. In the early 20th century, NZR had begun investigating railcar technology to provide passenger services on regional routes and rural branch lines where carriage trains were not economic and "mixed" trains (passenger carriages attached to freight trains) were undesirably slow. However, due to New Zealand's rugged terrain overseas technology could not simply be directly introduced. A number of experimental railcars and railbuses were developed. From 1925 these included the Leyland experimental petrol railcar and a fleet of Model T Ford railbuses, the Sentinel-Cammell steam railcar and from 1926 the Clayton steam railcar and successful Edison battery-electric railcar. 10 years later in 1936 the Leyland diesel railbus was introduced, but the first truly successful railcar class to enter service began operating that year, the Wairarapa railcar specially designed to operate over the Rimutaka Incline. This class followed the building of the Red Terror (an inspection car on a Leyland Cub chassis) for the General Manager in 1933. More classes followed over the years, primarily to operate regional services.

Following the success of the Wairarapa railcar class, in 1938 the Standard class railcars were introduced. A further improvement to passenger transport came in July that year, with electric services on the Johnsonville Line starting with the introduction of the DM/D English Electric Multiple Units.

Three new locomotive classes appeared in 1939: the K^{A} class, K^{B} class and the J class. The K^{A} was a further development of the K class, while the J class was primarily for lighter trackage in the South Island. The numerically smaller K^{B} class were allocated to the Midland line, where they dominated traffic. This led to the coining of the phrase "KB country" to describe the area, made famous by the National Film Unit's documentary of the same title.

=== World War II and its aftermath ===
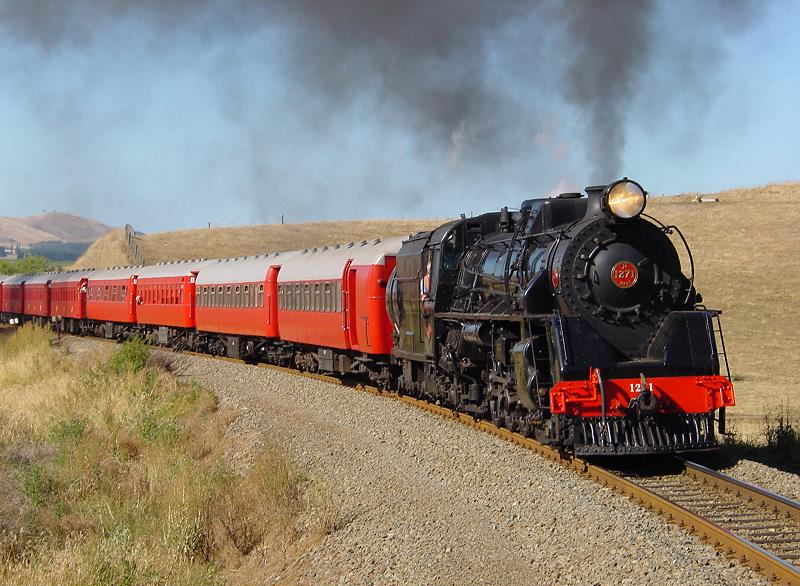
The J^{A} class were introduced in 1946, and were the last steam locomotives built by NZR.

As with the first world war, the Second World War had a significant impact on railways. The war created major labour shortages across the economy generally, and while considered "essential industry", railways were no exception. A large number of NZR employees signed up to fight in the war. For the first time, the department employed significant numbers of women to meet the shortages. The war created serious coal shortages as imported coal was no longer available. Despite this, NZR had record revenues in 1940.

Despite the war and associated labour and material shortages, new railway construction continued. In 1942 the Gisborne Line was finally opened, followed by the Main North Line between Picton and Christchurch being completed in 1945. The final section of the then ECMT, the Taneatua Branch, was also completed. Centralised Traffic Control (CTC) was installed from Taumaranui to Auckland at the same time.

In 1946 the last class of steam locomotives built by NZR was introduced, the J^{A} class. Due to coal shortages the K, J, K^{A}, J^{A} classes of steam locomotives were converted from coal to oil burning.

Following the war, NZR contracted the Royal New Zealand Air Force from 1947 to ship inter-island freight across Cook's Strait between Paraparaumu in the North Island and Blenheim in the South Island, as part of the "Rail Air" service. In 1950, Straits Air Freight Express (later known as SAFE Air) took over the contract from the RNZAF. The service was discontinued in the early 1980s.

=== Modernisation ===
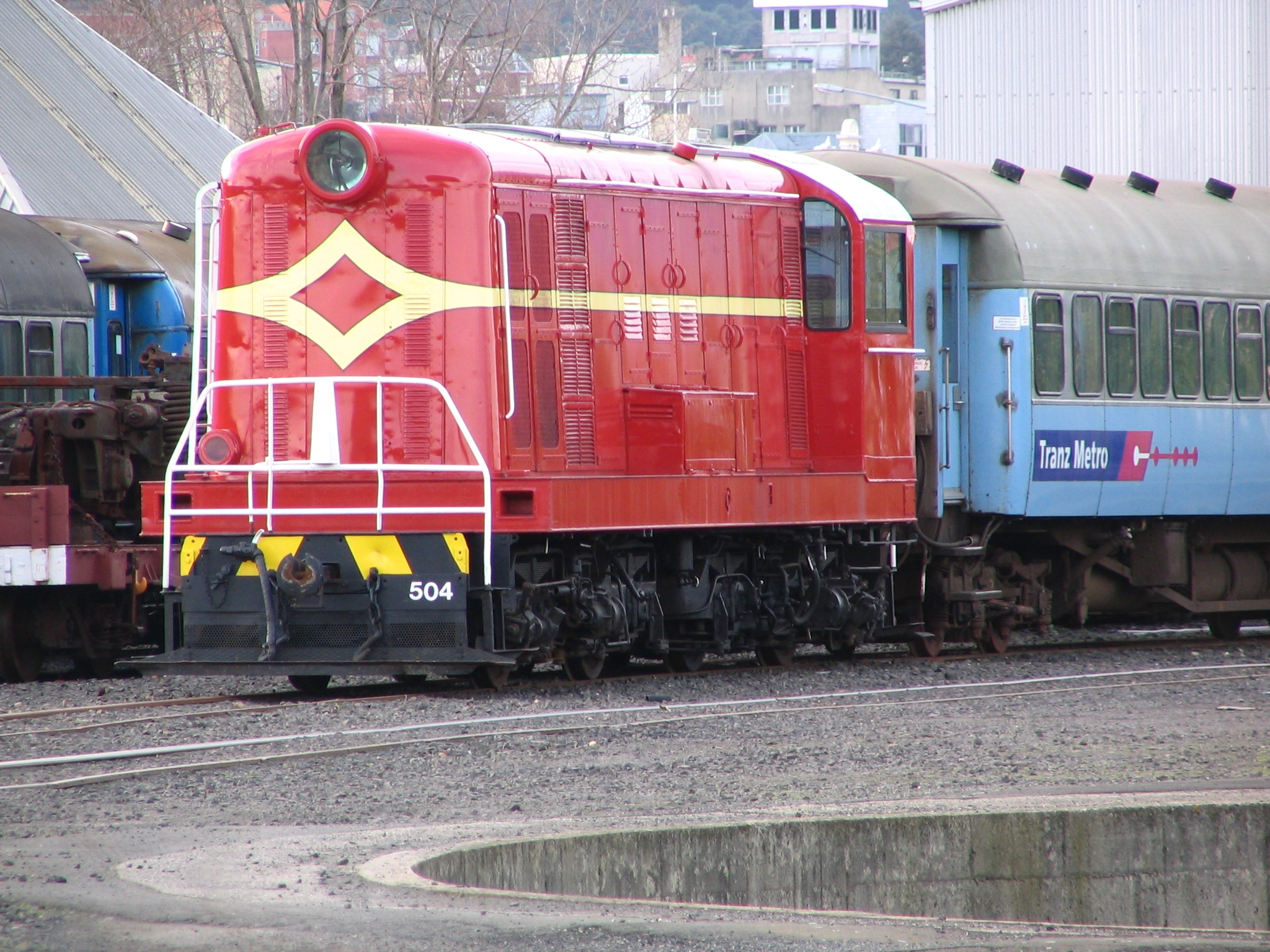
A D^{E} class locomotive, the first diesel-electric locomotives introduced by NZR.

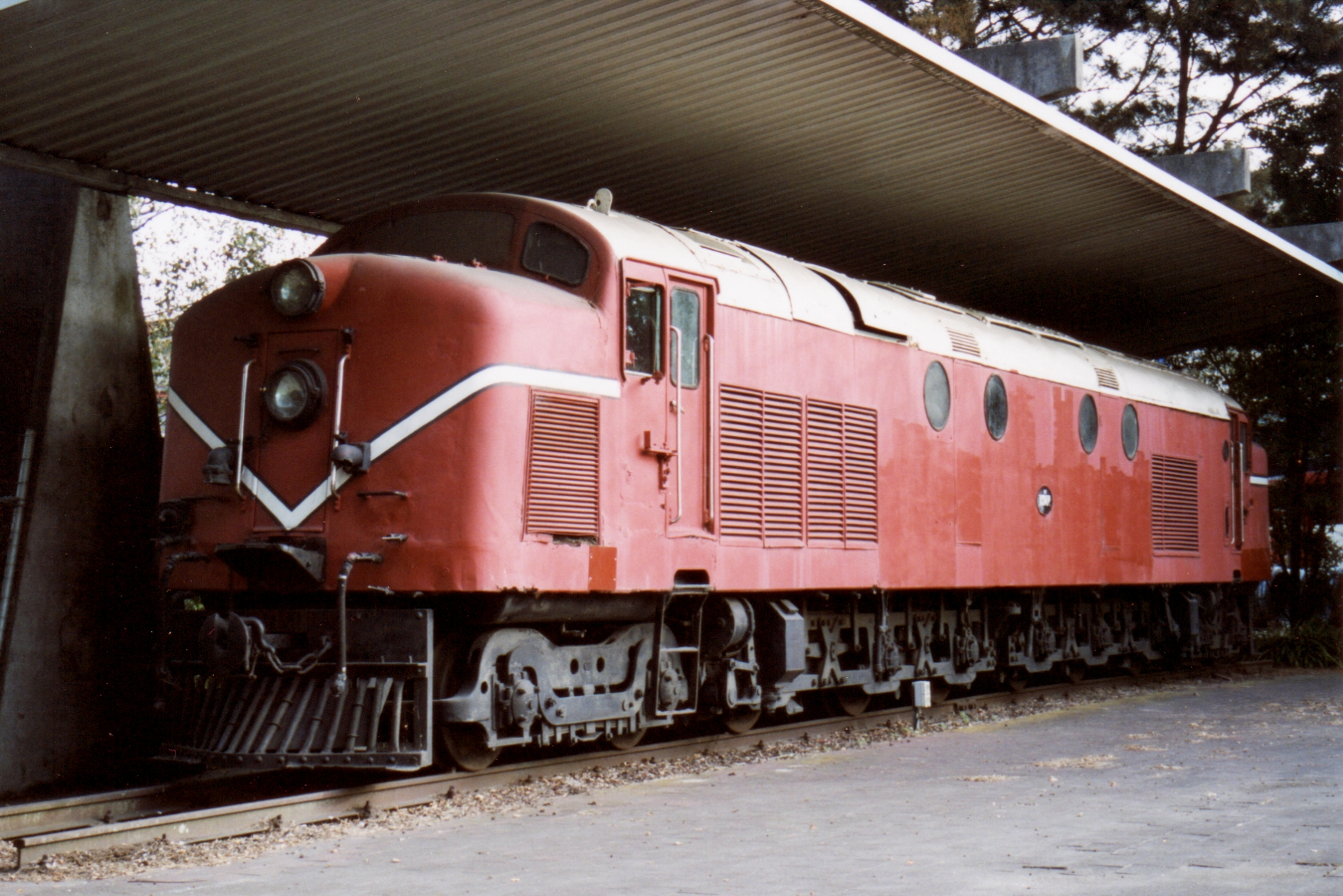
D^{F} class locomotive, the first mainline diesel-electric locomotives.

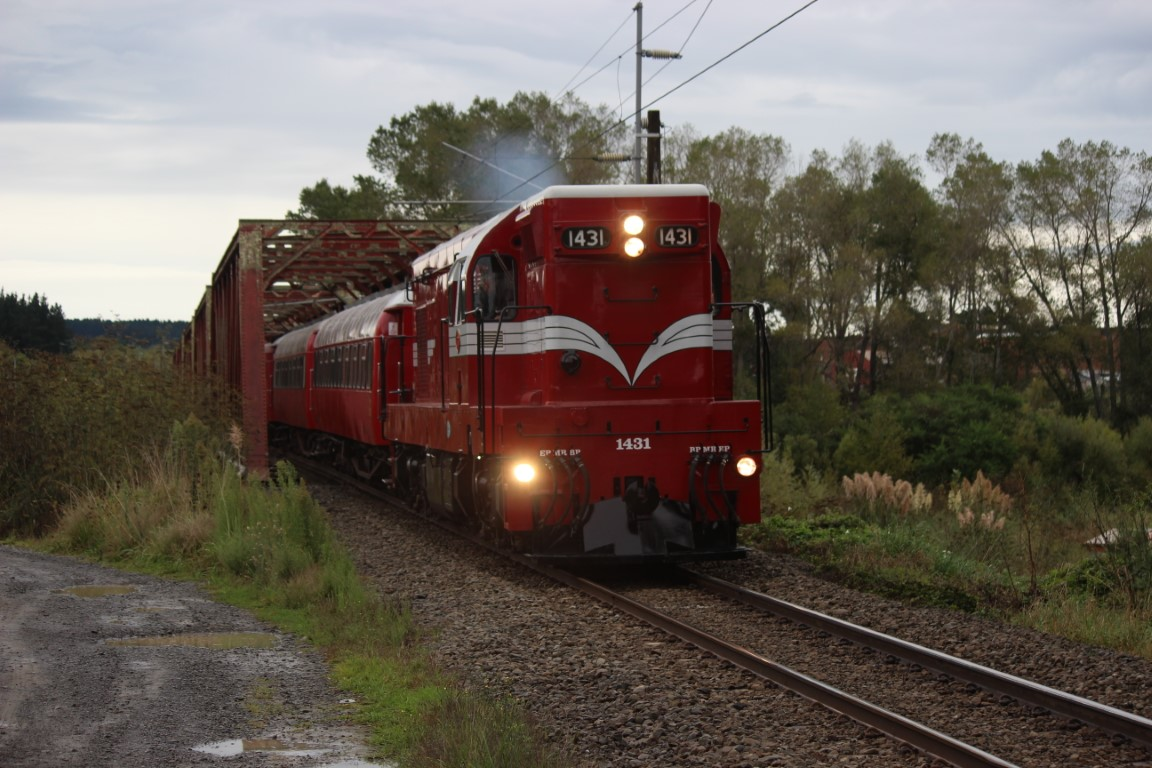
A D^{A} class locomotive.

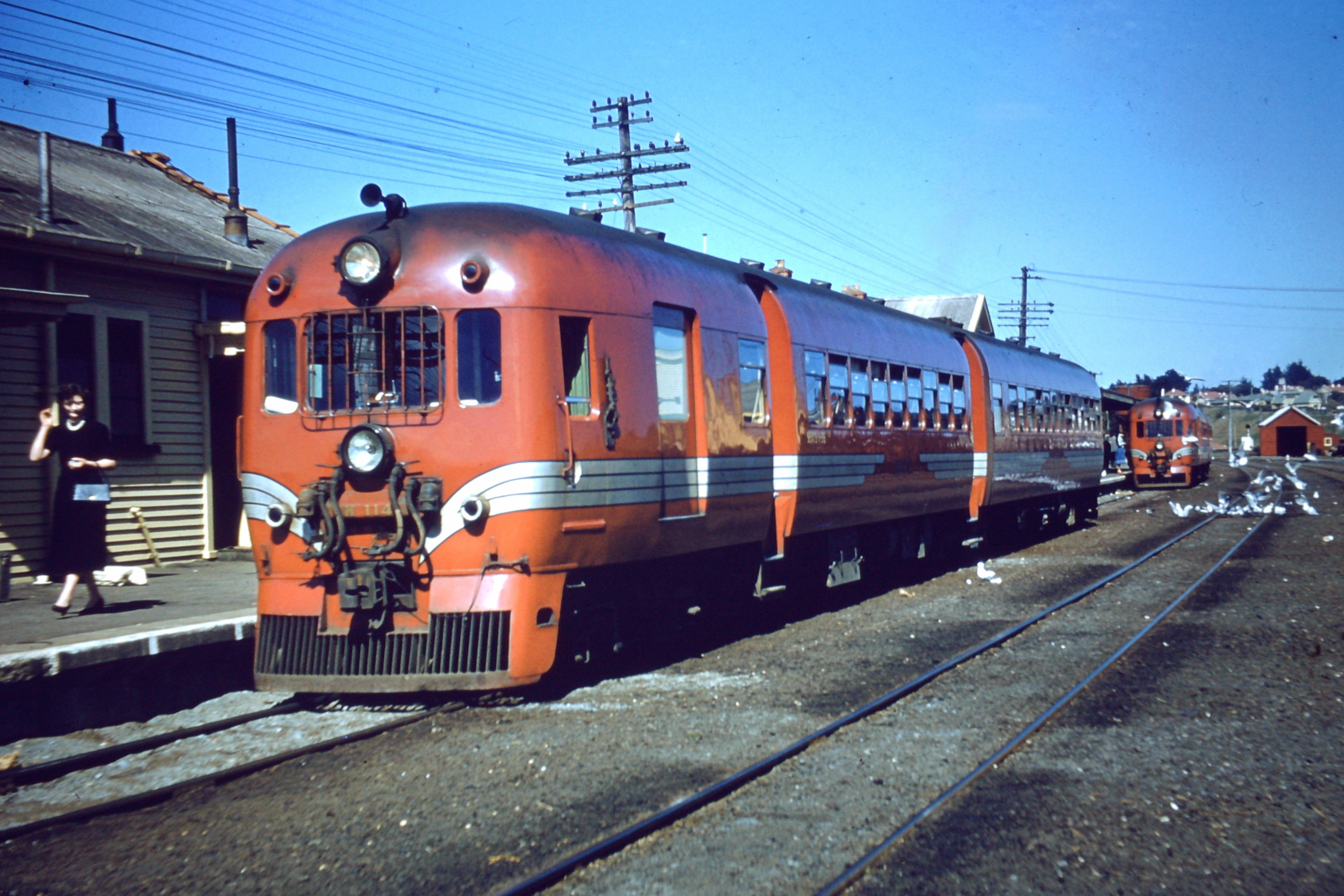
RM 114 at Kaikōura during the 1960s.

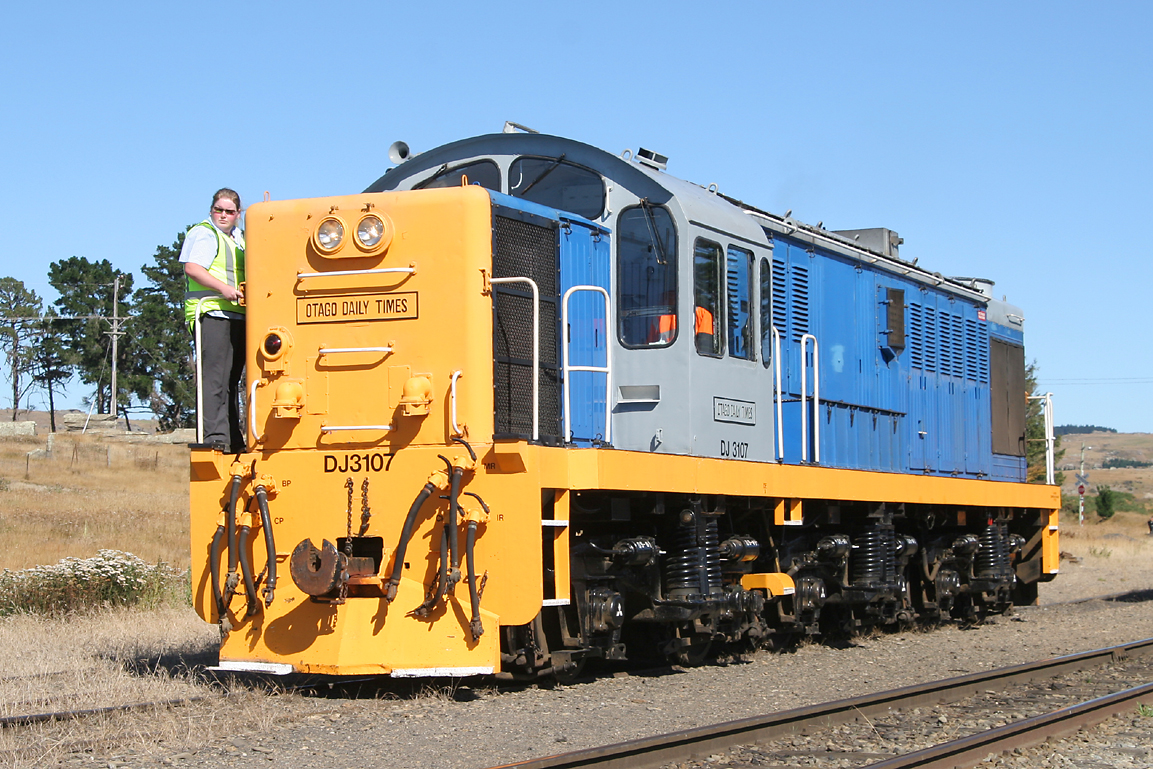
The D^{J} class, introduced from 1968, led to the end of steam traction in the South Island, and the whole of New Zealand, by 1971.

The General Manager of NZR, Frank Aickin, was an advocate for electrifying the entire North Island Main Trunk to alleviate the shortage of coal and the cost of importing diesel fuel; though he also recognised that steam and diesel traction would be required on other lines. NZR's first diesel-electric locomotives, the English Electric built D^{E} class, were introduced in 1951. The locomotives gave good service but were not powerful or numerous enough to seriously displace steam traction.

On Christmas Eve 1953, the worst disaster in NZR's history, and one of the worst in New Zealand's history occurred. 151 people died when the Wellington-Auckland express was derailed due to a bridge collapse north of Tangiwai due to a lahar from a volcanic eruption, in what became known as the Tangiwai disaster.

In 1954, the New Zealand railway network reached its zenith in terms of distance with 5,600 km (3,500 mi), 60% of it on gradients between 1 in 100 and 1 in 200 and 33% steeper than 1 in 100. The E^{W} class electric locomotives introduced for the Wellington electric system. They were the second class of electric locomotive to be used on this section of electrification. They were the most powerful locomotives on the system until the D^{X} class were introduced in 1972.

Aicken went as far as negotiating a tentative contract for the construction of electrification of the North Island Main Trunk and locomotives for it, but fell out with the Government in late 1951 and resigned. His successor, Horace Lusty, terminated the contract, instead ordering diesel electric locomotives from English Electric.

The following year, NZR introduced the dual-cab D^{F} class in 1954, the first main-line diesel-electric locomotives in service. They proved to be unsuccessful with numerous mechanical issues, and the original order of 31 was cancelled. Instead, D^{G} class locomotives, also built by English Electric, were ordered. While the D^{G} class proved more successful than the D^{F} class, steam remained the dominant form of traction.

NZR then entered into an agreement with General Motors for the supply of 40 EMD G12 model locomotives, designated by NZR as the D^{A} class. The first of these locomotives entered service in September 1955, with all of this initial order running by September 1957. The introduction of the D^{A} class, more than any other class, displaced steam locomotives from the North Island.

On 3 November 1955 the 8.798 kilometres (5.467 mi) long Rimutaka Tunnel opened, greatly reducing transit times between the Wairarapa and Wellington. This led to the closure of the Rimutaka Incline and its unique Fell railway system. Because steam locomotives could not be operated through the new tunnel, the Wairarapa Line was the first to be fully "dieselised". Amid many protests, the isolated Nelson Section was closed, although future Nelson Railway Proposals resurfaced from 1957.

The RM class "88 seater" or "Fiats" also began entering service from 1955. The railcars were designed to take over provincial inter-city routes but proved to be mechanically unreliable.

Despite large orders for diesel-electric locomotives, NZR was still building steam locomotives until 1956, when the last steam locomotive built by NZR, J^{A}1274, was completed at Hillside Workshops, Dunedin. The locomotive is now preserved in Dunedin near the railway station.

During the 1950s New Zealand industry was diversifying, particularly into the timber industry. On 6 October 1952 the Kinleith Branch, formerly part of the Taupo Totara Timber Company Railway, was opened to service a new pulp and paper mill at its terminus. NZR's first single-purpose log trains, called "express loggers", began to operate on this branch. The Kinleith Branch was shortly followed in 1957 by the 57 kilometres (35 mi) long Murupara Branch, which was opened running through the Bay of Plenty's Kaingaroa Forest. The branch is the last major branch line to open in New Zealand to date. The line was primarily built to service the Tasman Pulp and Paper Mill in Kawerau, with several loading points along its length. The line's success led to several Taupo Railway Proposals being put forward, with extensions of the branch being mooted at various times.

=== 1950s Commissions ===
In 1952 the Minister of Railways, Stan Goosman, set up a Commission to Inquire Into New Zealand Government Railways. It was chaired by Auckland mayor, Sir John Allum, and its other members were also businessmen, Carl Smith and Walter Oswald Gibb. It made many recommendations, including to abandon the Pōkeno-Paeroa railway, not complete the Nelson Section, close the Eyreton, Foxton, Greytown, Outram, Waikaia, Waimate, Waiuku and Wyndham branches, as only one branch made a profit, close Kaitoke and Woodville refreshment rooms and not electrify the North Island Main Trunk. It noted that interest on construction amounted to 10.6% of running costs (without which NZR was still profitable) and that there were reductions in services, due to coal and staff shortages between 1944 and 1952; for example, New Plymouth-Whanganui and Balclutha-Dunedin services dropped from 12 to 2. Noting that most general managers held the post for no more than 4 years, it said, "no business of this magnitude has any hope of being successful if changes in major policy can occur every few years with a change of managership" and "we do not believe that in these days of constantly changing economic conditions it is possible for one man to run successfully a trading concern with a turnover of £24,000,000 annually". They recommended setting up a New Zealand Railways Corporation, with no obligation to pay interest and a 5-man board, with 7-year contracts.

Instead of setting up a Corporation, a Railways Management Commission was formed in 1953. It was dissolved in 1956 and control reverted to the Minister and General Manager.

=== 1960s ===
In 1960 the second Christchurch railway station, at Moorhouse Avenue, was opened. The station was closed in 1990, with a new station being built at Addington. In 1961, livestock was exempted from the Transport Licensing Act, effectively opening the sector up to competition.

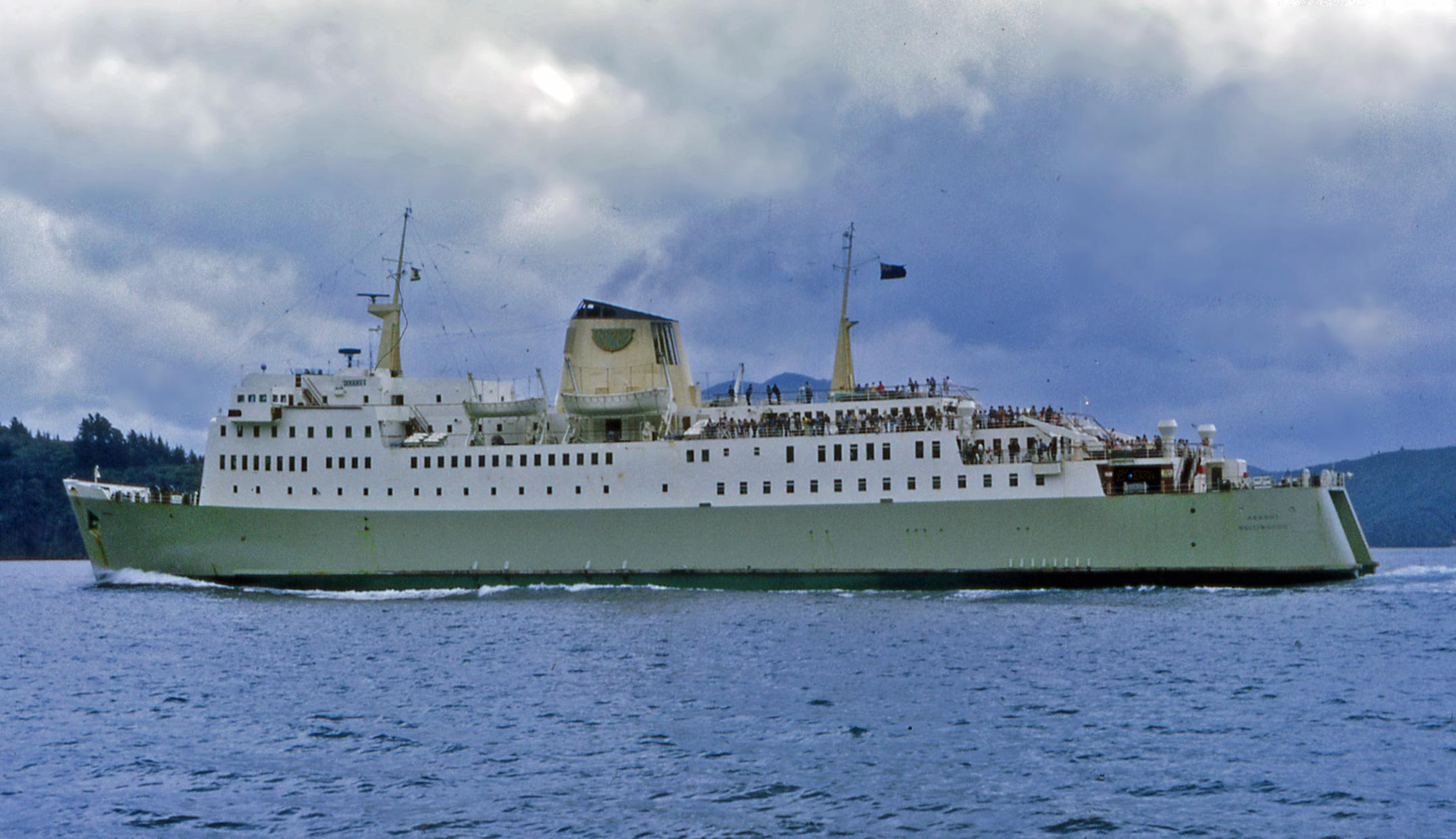
MV Aranui, the second inter-island rail ferry operated by NZR

The introduction of GMV Aramoana in 1962 heralded the start of inter-island ferry services run by NZR. The service was very successful, leading to criticism, when the Wellington–Lyttelton overnight ferry was withdrawn, that NZR was competing unfairly with private operators. Before the Aramoana was introduced, NZR could not compete for inter-island freight business, and the rail networks of both the North and South Islands were not well integrated. To send goods between the islands, freight had to be unloaded from wagons onto a ship on one island, unloaded at the other and then loaded back into wagons to resume its journey by rail. The introduction of a roll-on roll-off train ferry changed that. Wagons were rolled onto the ferry and rolled off at the other side. This led to many benefits for NZR customers.

NZR's 1963–1964 year-end financial report showed that inter-island ferry services contributed $1.07 million to NZRs profit of $1.077 million. A second ferry, MV Aranui, arrived in 1965.

Closures of rural branch lines reduced the total network length to 3,254 miles (5,237 km) in 1966.

In 1968 the "Blue Streak" refurbished railcars were introduced to the Wellington–Auckland run, having failed to raise patronage between Hamilton and Auckland. The success of the Blue Streaks led to the purchase of three new railcars in 1972. The Blue Streaks were then allocated to the Wellington—New Plymouth service. The introduction of the Japanese-built D^{J} class diesels from that year in the South Island accelerated the demise of steam, replacing the remaining steam locomotives. The final demise of steam came on 26 October 1971 with the withdrawal of the last class of mainline steam locomotives, the J^{A} class in the South Island (although the NZR-operated heritage Kingston Flyer service, using two A^{B} class steam locomotives began just two months later in December 1971).

=== 1970s ===
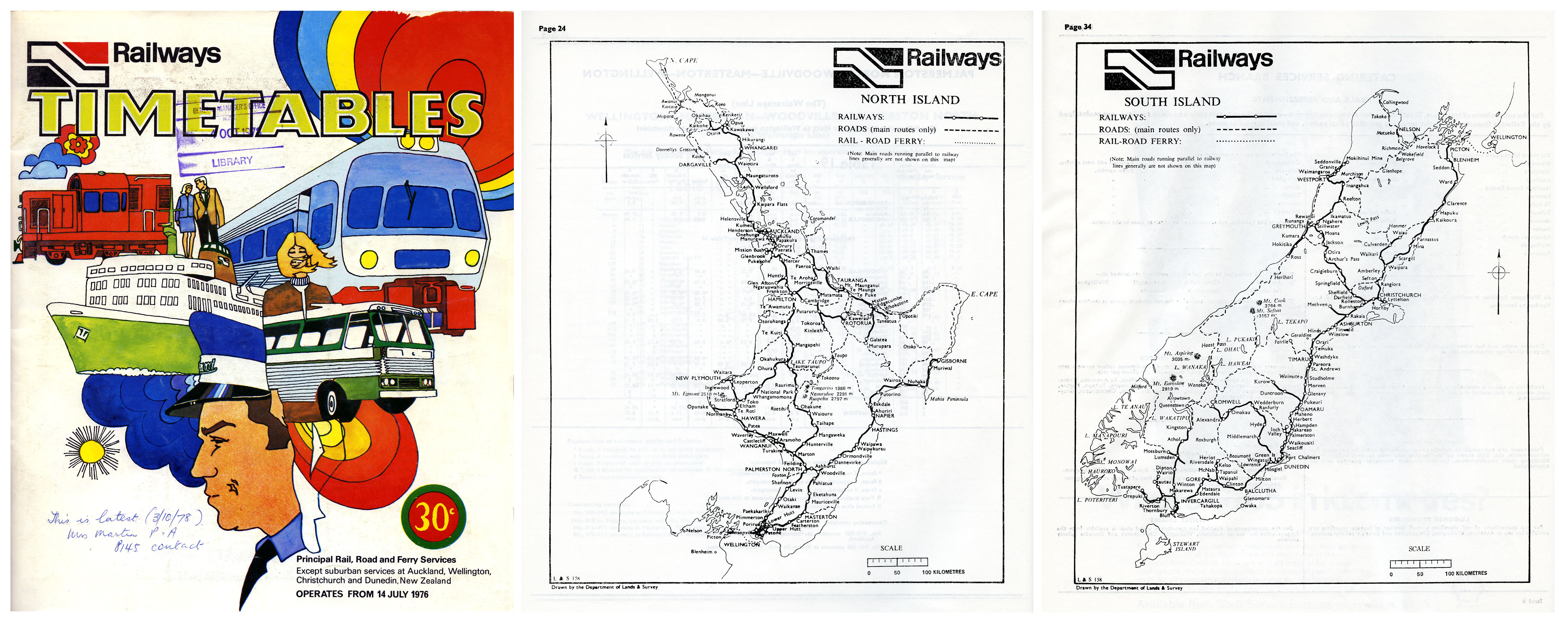
Timetable published by Railways from 1976

Railways' management had entered the 1970s with a modernisation plan around the theme "Great things are happening to Railways", to counter negative views of the railways' held by the general public and political elites. In 1970, a red, black and white corporate logo designed by Barry Ellis was introduced and a new Passenger Division was established. The Southerner between Christchurch and Invercargill was introduced, replacing the South Island Limited. The new service featured buffet cars and modernised rolling stock. New rolling stock included the Silver Star luxury Wellington–Auckland overnight train, sourced from Japan. The service never lived up to its promise and was withdrawn in 1979 due to poor patronage. In 1972 the first Silver Fern railcars were introduced for the daytime Wellington–Auckland run.

Freight traffic was again changing. In October 1969, the first unit coal trains were introduced, between coal mines at Huntly and New Zealand Steel at Mission Bush. The US-built General Electric U26C D^{X} class locomotives were introduced in 1972, with a further batch arriving in 1975. They were at the time the most powerful class of locomotives in New Zealand. At first, they were deployed to the North Island Main Trunk but gradually began working the express freight trains for which they were ordered throughout the North Island. The D^{X} continued to dominate North Island traffic until the electrification of the main trunk in the 1980s. 1971 saw the introduction of scheduled ISO shipping container services to New Zealand. NZR introduced its first purpose-built container wagons, the UK class, for the growing traffic that was quickly changing freight patterns. NZR was criticised for not investing enough in new bogie wagons.

Freight volumes greatly increased during the 1970s, despite the oil shocks of 1973 and 1979, with the greatest setback for freight volumes being Britain's entry into the European Economic Community in 1973. Inflationary pressures within the economy greatly rose, at the same time exports were falling. In reaction to this, the government attempted to control inflation by fixing prices; in 1972 it was decided that NZR could only charge for its services at no more than 1971 rates, despite rising fuel and labour costs. As a result, Railways' accounts were in a deficit for much of the decade and were topped up with a special "Vote Stabilisation" in the budget.

Following a change of Government in 1975, the Robert Muldoon led National Government decided to increase the transport licensing limited from 40 miles (64 km) to 150 km. This change took effect from 1977, and greatly increased competition for NZR on key routes between larger centres within 150 km of each other—routes such as Auckland–Hamilton, Hamilton–Tauranga, Wellington–Palmerston North and Christchurch–Ashburton.

In 1978 a major rebuilding programme of the ageing D^{A} class was launched, creating the D^{C} class. Locomotives were sent to Australia for rebuilding, with five being rebuilt at the NZR's own Hutt Workshops. Ten of the D^{B} class were rebuilt into the DBR class at the same time. The following year the Canadian built General Motors DF class was introduced.

Despite these efforts, there was still considerable negativity about railways and the service they offered. In its 30 May 1979 issue, the National Business Review said "long-distance rail travel is likely to completely disappear in the early 1980s. This will leave the slow creaking third world narrow gauge network to bulk freight where it can be more efficient."

=== Traffic Monitoring System ===
On 12 February 1979, NZR introduced a computerised "Traffic Monitoring System", known as TMS, nationwide. Implementation was completed in December 1980.

A pilot scheme of TMS began in 1973 on the Palmerston North - Gisborne Line between Woodville and Gisborne. TMS resulted in an 8 per cent improvement in wagon utilisation. In 1977, NZR decided to implement the system out across the entire network. Using dual IBM System/370 systems, one in active standby mode, the TMS system became a centralised system for tracking all wagon and locomotive movements.

As a result of the introduction of TMS, all locomotives, railcars, carriages and other rolling stock were renumbered. Class notations changed to machine-readable capital letters, rather than the previous superscript capital letter (e.g. D^{A} became DA.)

As a result of the introduction of TMS, NZR identified that it could reduce its total wagon requirements by 10 per cent of its 1980 fleet, resulting in the withdrawal of many older wagon types. NZR later sold its expertise and some of the TMS software to Victorian Railways in Victoria, Australia and the State Rail Authority (SRA) in New South Wales, Australia. The SRA's system introduced in 1986 was largely based on TMS, with NZR providing training, software and consulting during its implementation.

TMS was replaced in 1989 by Amicus.

=== "Time for Change" ===
Following the increase in distance for road transport licensing in 1977, NZR General Manager Trevor Hayward published a pamphlet entitled "Time for Change". In it, he spelt out the basic challenge facing NZR at the time: providing both commercial and loss-making "social" services. While Hayward was not against road transport deregulation, he was in favour of greater investment in NZR to meet freight requirements and shutting down uneconomic services.

In 1981, parliament passed the New Zealand Railways Corporation Act, and the department was corporatised as the New Zealand Railways Corporation on 1 April 1982.

== Branches ==
The Railways Department followed a traditional branch structure, which was carried over to the corporation.

- Commercial;
- Finance and Accounts;
- Mechanical;
- Publicity and Advertising;
- Refreshment;
- Railways Road Services;
- Stores;
- Traffic; and
- Way and Works.

== Performance ==
The table below records the performance of the Railways Department in terms of freight tonnage:

Year	Tonnes (000s)	Net tonne-km (millions)
1972	11,300	2,980
1973	12,100	3,305
1974	13,200	3,819
1975	12,900	3,695
1976	13,200	3,803
1977	13,600	4,058.9
1978	12,600	3,824
1979	11,700	3,693
1980	11,800	3,608
1981	11,400	3,619
1982	11,500	3,738.9

== Workshops ==
The following NZR workshops were builders of locomotives:

- Hutt Workshops, Lower Hutt, at Petone to 1929
- Hillside Workshops, Dunedin, now Hillside Engineering
- Addington Workshops, Christchurch (closed 1990)
- East Town Workshops, Wanganui (closed 1986) also Aramoho
- Newmarket Workshops, Auckland (opened 1875, closed 1928)
- Otahuhu Workshops, Auckland (opened 1928, closed 1992)

=== Minor workshops ===
None of these minor workshops manufactured locomotives, although major overhauls were carried out:

- Greymouth (Elmer Lane)
- Invercargill
- Kaiwharawhara (signals)
- Napier
- Nelson
- New Plymouth (Sentry Hill)
- Westport
- Whanganui (East Town)

=== Locomotives ===
Steam locomotives built and rebuilt at NZR workshops:

Workshops	New	Rebuild	Total
Addington	114	12	126
Hillside	165	21	186
Hutt	77	0	77
Petone	4	7	11
Newmarket	1	9	10
Westport	0	2	2
Total	361	49	410

Nine of the ED electric locomotives were constructed (assembled) at the Hutt (7) and Addington (2) workshops. Various diesel locomotives have been rebuilt at NZR workshops, for example, five of the DA as DC, though most rebuilding has been contracted out. Hillside built 9 NZR TR class diesel shunters.

The Auckland workshops (Newmarket, then Otahuhu) specialised in car and wagon work, and in repairs and maintenance.

== Private firms that built steam locomotives for NZR ==
British companies, e.g.:

- Avonside Engine Company (Fairlie and Fell locomotives)
- Beyer, Peacock and Company
- Clayton Carriage and Wagon
- Dübs and Company
- Henry Hughes's Locomotive & Tramway Engine Works
- Hunslet Engine Company
- Nasmyth, Wilson and Company
- Neilson and Company
- North British Locomotive Company (built a quarter (141) of NZR steam locomotives; the NZR J class (1939))
- Robert Stephenson and Hawthorns
- Sharp, Stewart and Company
- Vulcan Foundry
- Yorkshire Engine Co

American companies, e.g.:

- Baldwin Locomotive Works Built 111 steam locomotives for NZR and the WMR, the first were the NZR T class of 1879.
- Rogers Locomotive and Machine Works Built eight NZR K class (1877), the first American locomotives purchased.
- Brooks Locomotive Works Built Ub17 during purchase by ALCO
- Richmond Locomotive Works Built Ub371 during purchase by ALCO (ten of the NZR Ub class were built by Baldwin).

New Zealand companies:

- James Davidson & Co, Dunedin
- A & G Price, Thames
- E. W. Mills and Company
- Scott Brothers, Christchurch

== Companies that supplied NZR with diesel locomotives ==
- Clyde Engineering
- Commonwealth Engineering
- Drewry Car Co.
- Electro-Motive Diesel
- English Electric various British contractors and English Electric Australia
- General Electric
- General Motors Diesel
- Hitachi
- Hunslet Engine Company
- Mitsubishi Heavy Industries
- A & G Price, Thames
- Toshiba
- Vulcan Foundry

== Suppliers of electric traction to NZR ==
- English Electric (New Zealand DM class electric multiple unit and NZR EC class, NZR ED class, NZR EO class (1923), NZR EW class locomotives)
- Goodman Manufacturing (New Zealand EB class locomotive)
- Toshiba (New Zealand EA class locomotive)

== Suppliers of bus and coach chassis to NZR ==
- Associated Equipment Company
- Albion Motors
- Bedford Vehicles Supplied a record 1260 Bedford SB chassis (largest fleet of Bedford SB buses in the world). As well as around 400 trucks
- Ford
- Hino Motors
- Volvo

== Suppliers of ferries to NZR ==
- McGregor and Company, Dunedin, New Zealand. Builders of TSS Earnslaw.
- William Denny and Brothers, Dumbarton, Scotland. Builders of GMV Aramoana.
- Vickers Limited, Newcastle, England. Builders of GMV Aranui.
- Chantiers Dubegion, Nantes, France. Builders of MV Arahanga and MV Aratika.

== People ==
- A. L. Beattie, Chief Mechanical Engineer
- Whitford Brown, civil engineer, Mayor of Porirua
- Alf Cleverley, fitter at Petone and Hutt Workshops, Olympic boxer
- Major Norman Frederick Hastings DSO, engineering fitter at Petone Railways Workshop, killed on Gallipoli and commemorated on the Petone railway station memorial.
- Graham Latimer, was stationmaster Kaiwaka, later president of New Zealand Maori Council
- Ritchie Macdonald, worked at Otahuhu Workshops, union secretary, later member of parliament
- Garnet Mackley, General Manager 1933–1940, later member of parliament
- George Troup, Architect, Mayor of Wellington

== Publication ==
From May 1926 until June 1940, the New Zealand Railways Magazine was published as the NZRD's house organ.

== See also ==
- List of Chief Executives of New Zealand Railways
- New Zealand Railways Corporation
- Rail transport in New Zealand
- Railway houses

Preceded by Public Works Department	New Zealand Railways Department; 1880–1981	Succeeded by New Zealand Railways Corporation
