= Tokarahi =

Coordinates: 44°57′S 170°39′E

Tokarahi is a small village located in the Otago region of the South Island of New Zealand. Its location is a rural setting in the Waiareka Valley, inland from Oamaru. Economic activity is focused on agriculture.

== History ==
Tokarahi was first a large sheep station owned by John Borton (1826–1916) and Alexander McMaster (1823–1885). Together with their Maerewhenua run their holdings were: freehold 13,000 acres and leasehold 70,000 acres. They ran 70,000 sheep when they ended their partnership in 1887, McMaster taking Tokarahi. A large portion, 11,000 acres or 4,500 hectares, was acquired by the government for close settlement in 1894. Holdings were given to 79 farmers. Borton's property at Maerewhenua was bought the following year.

For a number of decades, Tokarahi served as the terminus of one arm of the Ngapara and Tokarahi Branches, two connected branch line railways built to open up Oamaru's hinterland and encourage farming development. After the first line was opened to Ngapara in 1877, a side-branch was built to Tokarahi and opened in 1887. Its construction was partly used to provide work for those unemployed due to the Long Depression. For much of the Tokarahi Branch's history, a "mixed" train of both goods and passengers would run return to Oamaru daily. This service met a similar train from Ngapara at Windsor Junction, where it formed a dedicated passenger train and a freight train that followed at a slower pace. The reverse of this procedure took place in the afternoon. Trains to and from Tokarahi were often hauled by T class steam locomotives.

Tokarahi became one of the first places on the national rail network to lose its passenger service, with a bus replacement introduced in 1926. Due to its small population, low economic activity, and proximity to the Ngapara arm of the railway, Tokarahi lost its railway entirely only a few years later. The line was closed on 14 July 1930. Very little today survives of the town's railway depot.

The Elephant Rocks area around the village was used as the location for Aslan's encampment in the 2005 film adaptation of The Lion, the Witch and the Wardrobe, one of the Narnia books written by the British author C.S. Lewis.
