= Windsor Junction =

Windsor Junction can refer to:

- Windsor Junction, Nova Scotia
- Windsor Junction, a station on the Ngapara Branch railway line in New Zealand
