= NZR T class =

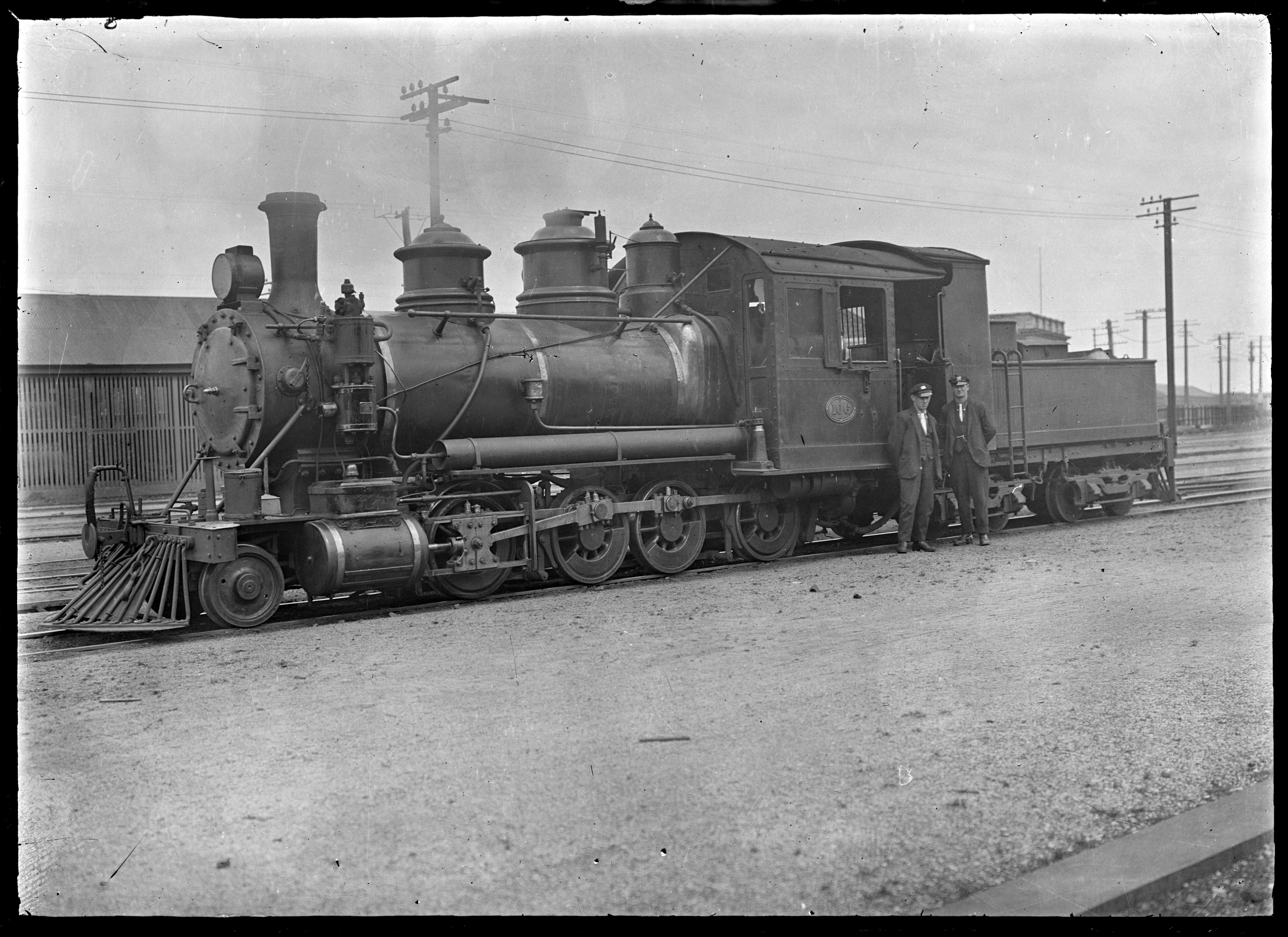
- No. 106, T class in 1926
Type and origin
- Power type: Steam
- Builder: Baldwin Locomotive Works, United States
- Serial number: 4660–4661, 4664-4667
- Build date: 1879
- Total produced: 6
Specifications
- Configuration
  - Whyte: 2-8-0
  - UIC: 1′D
- Gauge: 3 ft 6 in (1,067 mm)
- Driver dia.: 36 in (914 mm)
- Length: 44 ft 10 in (13.67 m)
- Adhesive weight: 23.0 long tons (23.4 t; 25.8 short tons); 24.7 long tons (25.1 t; 27.7 short tons) (reboilered)
- Loco weight: 26.2 long tons (26.6 t; 29.3 short tons)
- Tender weight: 16.0 long tons (16.3 t; 17.9 short tons)
- Fuel type: Coal
- Fuel capacity: 2.1 long tons (2.1 t; 2.4 short tons)
- Water cap.: 1,300 imp gal (5,900 L; 1,600 US gal)
- Firebox
  - Grate area: 15.7 sq ft (1.46 m^{2})
- Boiler pressure: 130 psi (896 kPa); 160 psi (1,103 kPa) (reboilered)
- Heating surface: 812 sq ft (75.4 m^{2}); 920 sq ft (85 m^{2}) (reboilered)
- Superheater: None
- Cylinders: Two, outside
- Cylinder size: 15 in × 18 in (381 mm × 457 mm)
Performance figures
- Maximum speed: 18 mph (29 km/h)
- Tractive effort: 11,700 lbf (52.04 kN); 14,300 lbf (63.61 kN) (reboilered)
Career
- Operators: New Zealand Railways
- Numbers: 101–106
- Locale: All of New Zealand
- First run: 1880
- Last run: 1922-1928
- Disposition: All scrapped

The NZR T class was a class of steam locomotive used in New Zealand; of the "Consolidation" type, popular in North America, especially with the narrow gauge 3 ft (914 mm) Denver and Rio Grande Western Railroad.

== History ==
The Baldwin and Rogers locomotives reflected the styling adopted in the 1870s by American builders with elements from the Renaissance Revival and Neo-Baroque architectural styles, and with Islamic e.g. Moorish (from Alhambra) influences. Bold colours and painted decorations were used. Many Baldwin locomotives such as the T class were in Olive Green ground colour as originally built, although the Baldwin N and O classes of the 1880s had Tuscan Red ground colour.

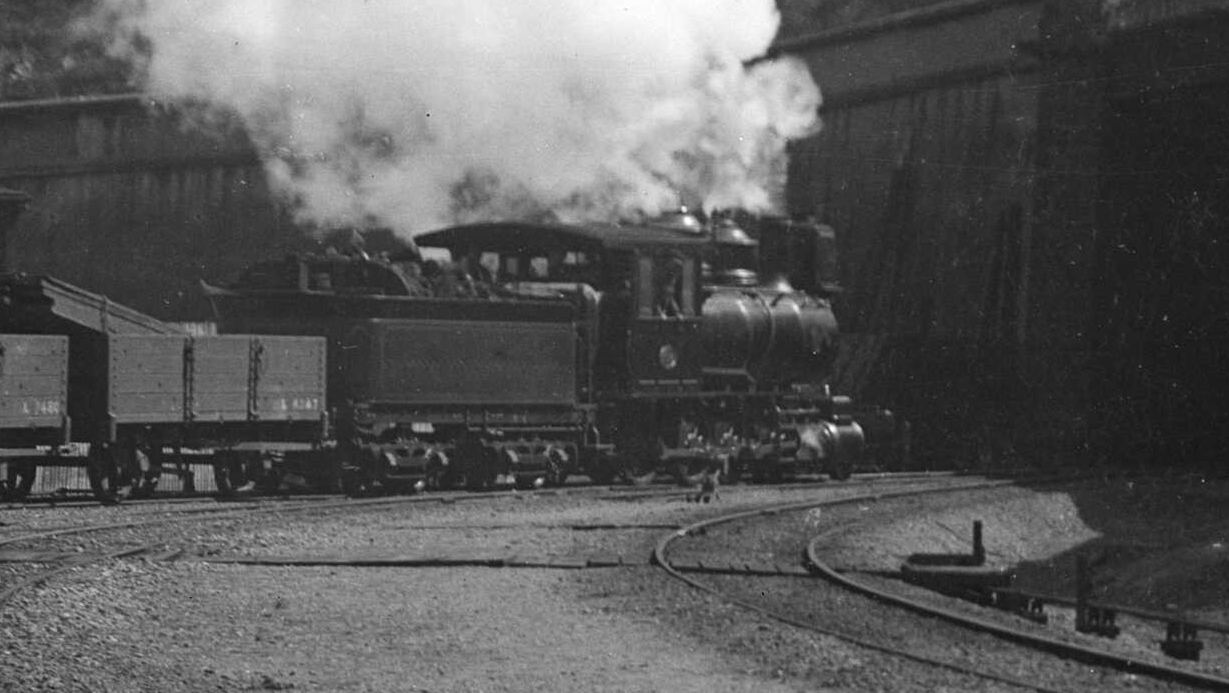
Goods train with T class locomotive leaving Lyttelton, ca. 1904

== In service ==
Because of its small diameter driving wheels, the T class was typically limited to a speed of 29 km/h (18 mph).

== Withdrawal and disposal ==
The first T class locomotive was withdrawn in 1922, with the last few withdrawn in 1927. Some managed to survive long enough to be dumped or have components dumped when the NZR started dumping locomotives for embankment protection in 1926. The last member T 102 was withdrawn in March 1928
