= Nelson Branch =

Stream in the American state of Missouri

Location
- Country: United States
- State: Missouri
- County: Dent County

Physical characteristics
- Source
  - coordinates: 37°41′16″N 91°30′57″W
  - elevation: 1240 feet
- Mouth
  - coordinates: 37°42′39″N 91°28′22″W
  - elevation: 1010 feet

Nelson Branch is a stream in Dent County in the U.S. state of Missouri. It is a tributary to the Meramec River which it joins approximately six miles northeast of Salem. The stream headwaters arise adjacent to Missouri Route 19 three miles north of Salem and one mile south of the community of Howes.

Nelson Branch has the name of the local Nelson family.

== See also ==
- List of rivers of Missouri
