= Okahukura railway station =

Former railway station in New Zealand

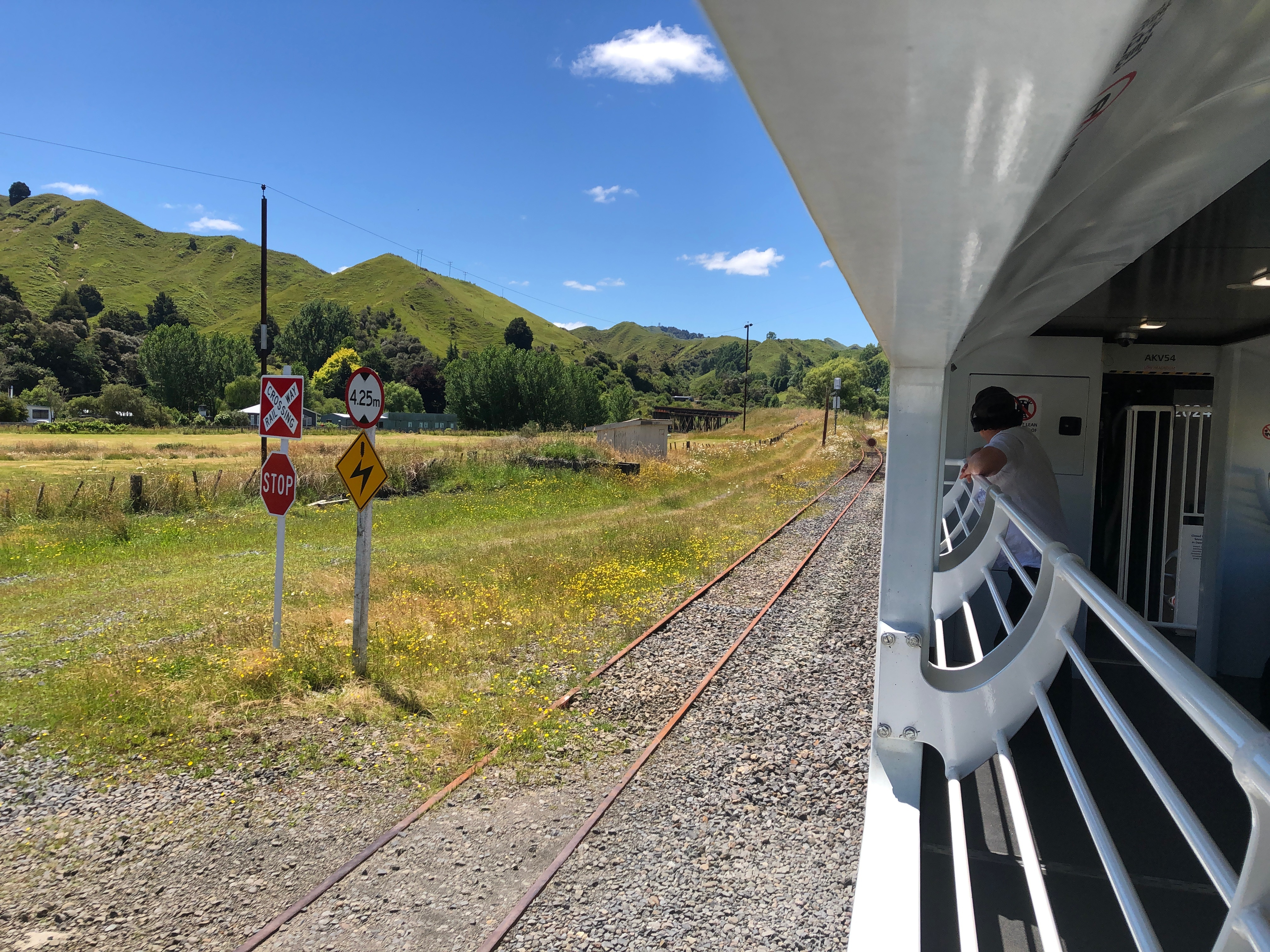
- Okahukura station site in 2019; Double deck bridge on Stratford branch in background

General information
- Location: Okahukura; New Zealand
- Coordinates: 38.801591°S 175.22378°E
- Elevation: 178 m (584 ft)
- Line: North Island Main Trunk
- Distance: Wellington 408.54 km (253.85 mi)

History
- Opened: 1912
- Closed: Before Dec 1975 passenger 27 August 1978 goods
- Electrified: June 1988
- Former names: Okahukora to 7 Aug 1913

Passengers
- 1934: 11,940

Services
Preceding station	Historical railways	Following station
Te Koura; Line open, station closed	North Island Main Trunk; KiwiRail	Taringamotu; Line open, station closed
Location
Notes
- Previous Station (NIMT): Taringamotu Station; Previous Station (SOL): Tuhua Station; Next Station (NIMT): Te Koura Station

Okahukura railway station was a station on the North Island Main Trunk in New Zealand.

The station opened when work started on the eastern end of the Stratford–Okahukura Line. It was served by through trains on that line from 3 September 1933 (though rails were completed by 7 November 1932) to 2009, being 9.65 km (6.00 mi) east of Tuhua. The Public Works Department operated a limited train service as far as Matiere from 1922. A junction with the NIMT at Ongarue, and even as far north as Puketutu (via Mokauiti and Ohura) had been considered before the Okahukura route was decided in 1911. Work started shortly after Sir Joseph Ward had turned the first sod, including the construction of workshops and 4 railway houses at Okahukura, and the station opened the following year. It seems that the initial service was provided by coaches attached to goods trains.

A cattle yard and goods shed were added in 1915. In 1916 a porter was paid 9 shillings a week.

== Patronage ==
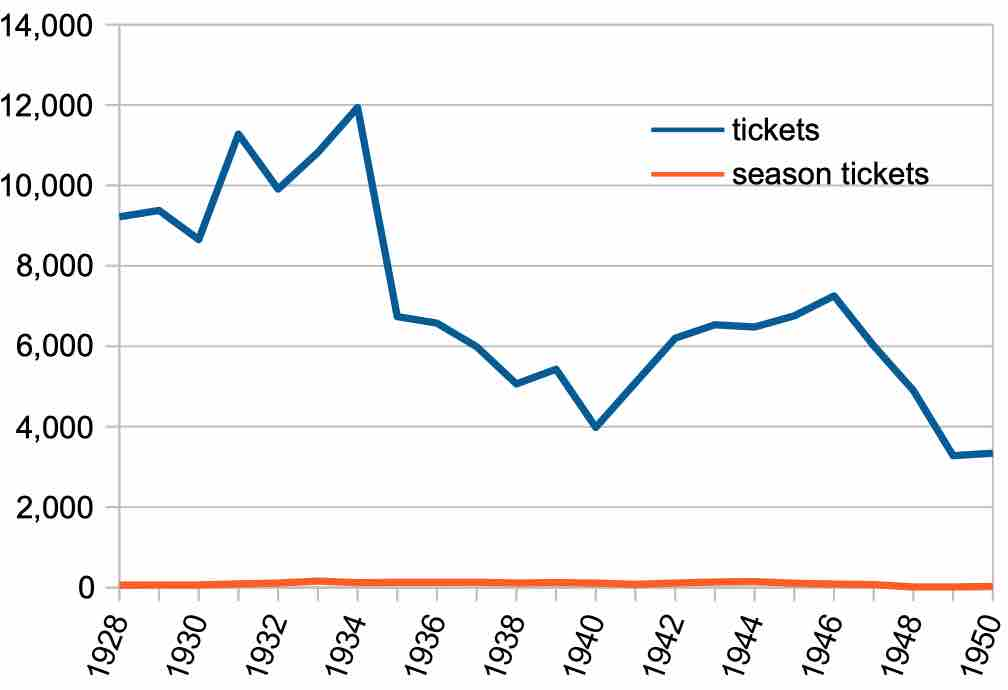
Okahukura railway station passenger use 1928-1950

Passenger numbers peaked in 1934, as shown in the graph and table below -

year	tickets	season tickets	staff	source
1928	9,219	59		"STATEMENT No. 18 Statement of Traffic and Revenue for each Station for the Year ended 31st March, 1928"
1929	9,379	64		"STATEMENT No. 18 Statement of Traffic and Revenue for each Station for the Year ended 31st March, 1929"
1930	8,654	63		"STATEMENT No. 18 Statement of Traffic and Revenue for each Station for the Year ended 31st March, 1930"
1931	11,279	90		"STATEMENT No. 18 Statement of Traffic and Revenue for each Station for the Year ended 31st March, 1931"
1932	9,910	111		"STATEMENT No. 18 Statement of Traffic and Revenue for each Station for the Year ended 31st March, 1932"
1933	10,822	160		"STATEMENT No. 18 Statement of Traffic and Revenue for each Station for the Year ended 31st March, 1933"
1934	11,940	119		"STATEMENT No. 18 Statement of Traffic and Revenue for each Station for the Year ended 31st March, 1934"
1935	6,739	129		"STATEMENT No. 18 Statement of Traffic and Revenue for each Station for the Year ended 31st March, 1935"
1936	6,575	129		"STATEMENT No. 18 Statement of Traffic and Revenue for each Station for the Year ended 31st March, 1936"
1937	5,989	130		"STATEMENT No. 18 Statement of Traffic and Revenue for each Station for the Year ended 31st March, 1937"
1938	5,062	114		"STATEMENT No. 18 Statement of Traffic and Revenue for each Station for the Year ended 31st March, 1938"
1939	5,431	121		"STATEMENT No. 18 Statement of Traffic and Revenue for each Station for the Year ended 31st March, 1939"
1940	3,983	110		"STATEMENT No. 18 Statement of Traffic and Revenue for each Station for the Year ended 31st March, 1940"
1941	5,094	79		"STATEMENT No. 18 Statement of Traffic and Revenue for each Station for the Year ended 31st March, 1941"
1942	6,202	111		"STATEMENT No. 18 Statement of Traffic and Revenue for each Station for the Year ended 31st March, 1942"
1943	6,536	138		"STATEMENT No. 18 Statement of Traffic and Revenue for each Station for the Year ended 31st March, 1943"
1944	6,478	144		"STATEMENT No. 18 Statement of Traffic and Revenue for each Station for the Year ended 31st March, 1944"
1945	6,757	106		"STATEMENT No. 18 Statement of Traffic and Revenue for each Station for the Year ended 31st March, 1945"
1946	7,254	86		"STATEMENT No. 18 Statement of Traffic and Revenue for each Station for the Year ended 31st March, 1946"
1947	6,012	72		"STATEMENT No. 18 Statement of Traffic and Revenue for each Station for the Year ended 31st March, 1947"
1948	4,899	14		"STATEMENT No. 18 Statement of Traffic and Revenue for each Station for the Year ended 31st March, 1948"
1949	3,279	14		"STATEMENT No. 18 Statement of Traffic and Revenue for each Station for the Year ended 31st March, 1949"
1950	3,340	26		"STATEMENT No. 18 Statement of Traffic and Revenue for each Station for the Year ended 31st March, 1950"

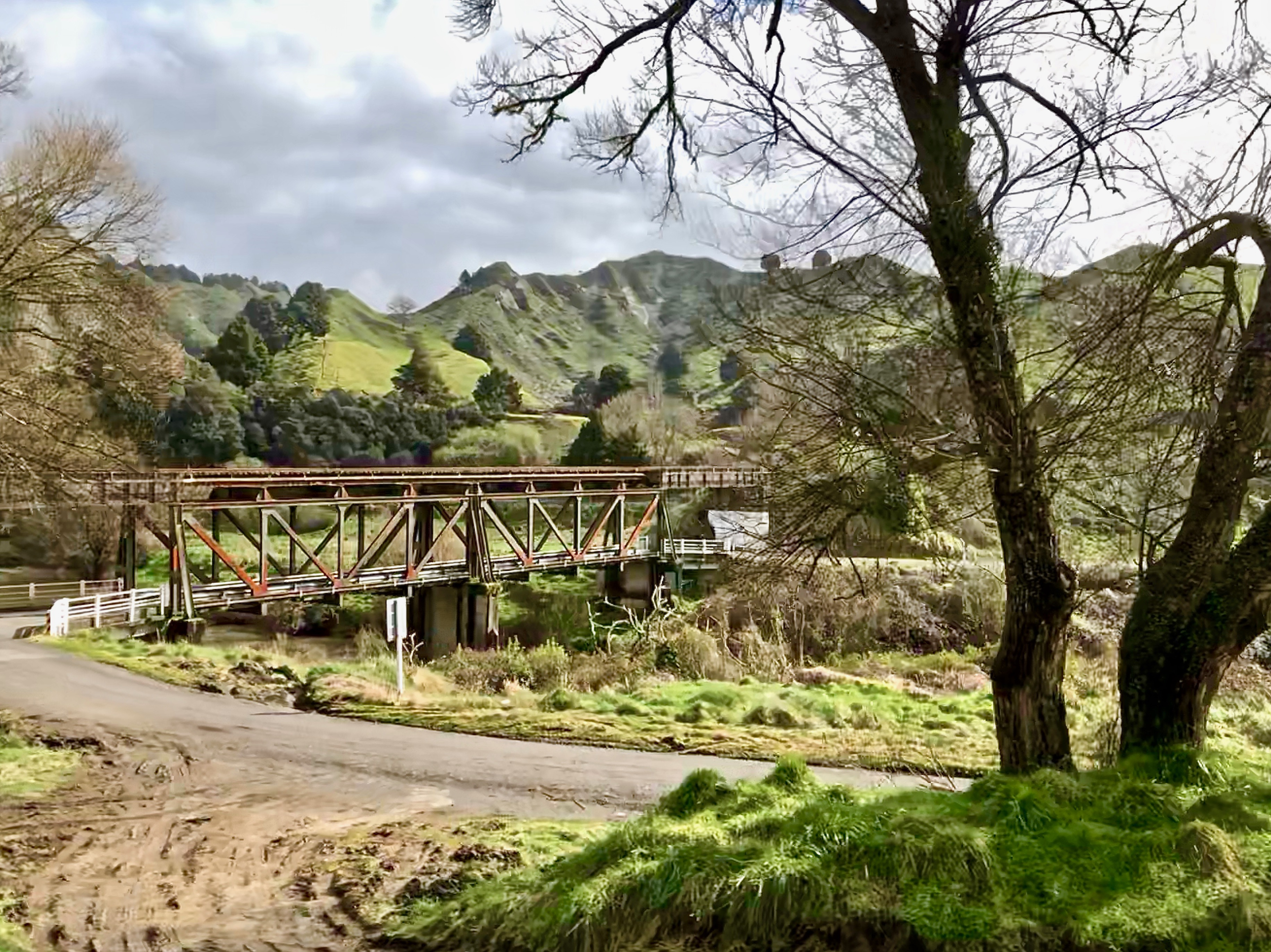
Okahukura road-rail bridge

== Road-rail bridge ==
The concrete foundations of the 260 ft (79 m) road-rail bridge over the Ongarue River, on the Stratford line had been laid by 1918, but war-time steel shortages delayed further work. The first piles were sunk in 1916 and it had been completed by January 1922.

In 2019 reopening of the line was listed as a possible future priority.

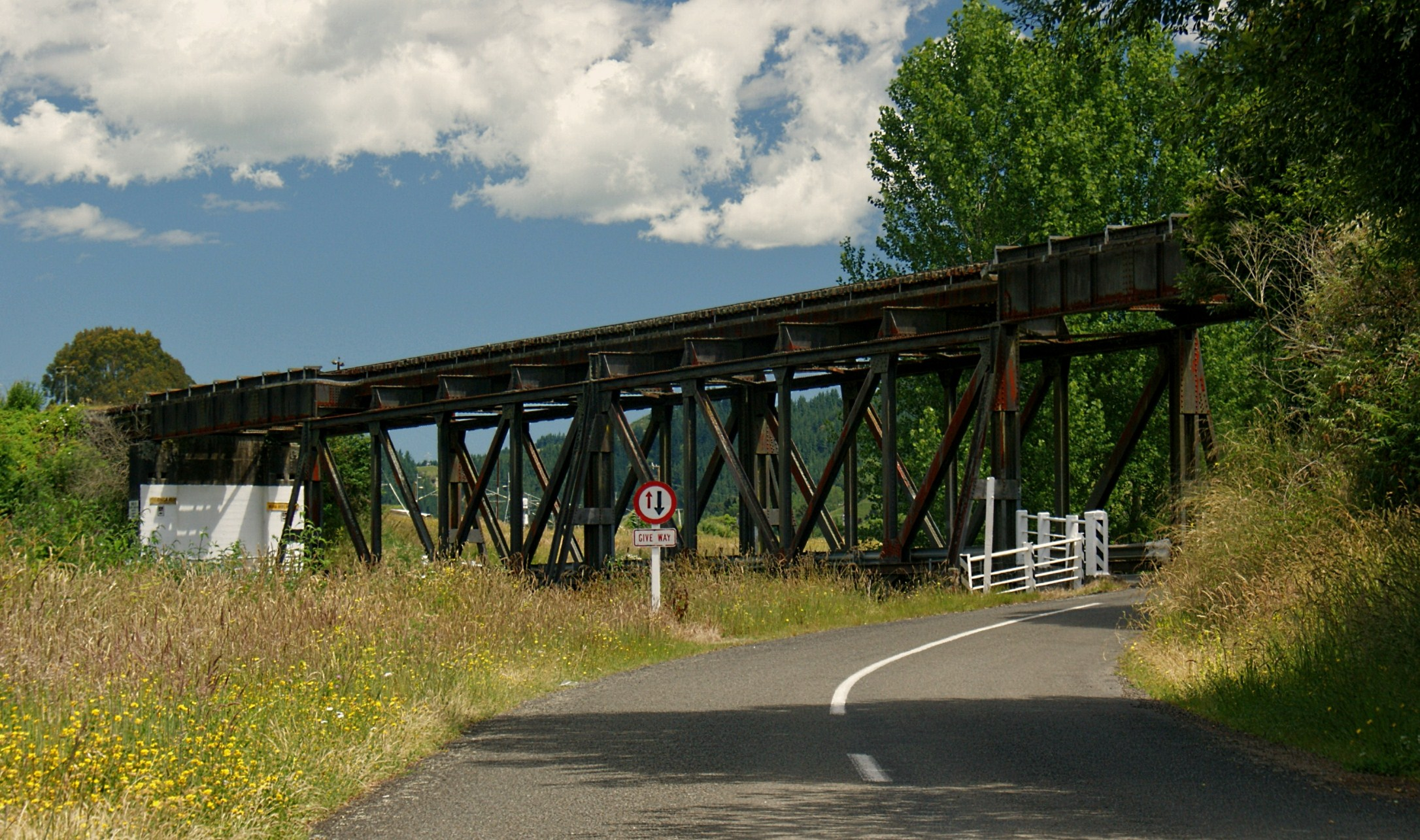
Okahakura Road Rail Bridge

== Okahukura tunnel ==
76 ch (5,000 ft; 1,500 m) long Okahukura tunnel, is 2 mi (3.2 km) up from Okahukura, along the Stratford line, on a 1 in 50 gradient. It was started in February 1914 and completed in December 1920, after digging out 58,000 yd^{3} (44,000 m^{3}) of mudstone.
