= Taringamotu River =

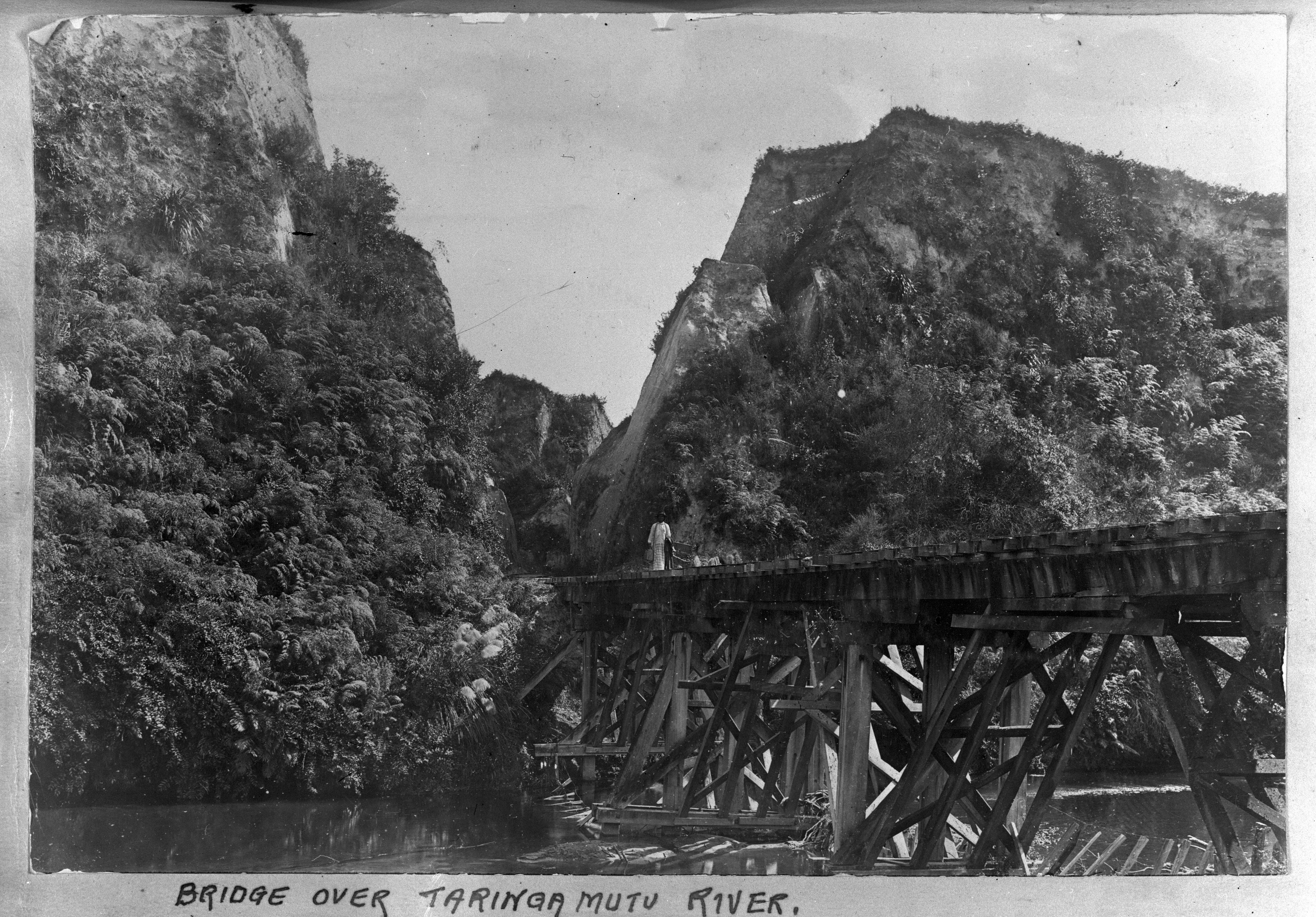
- Historic bridge carrying the Taringamotu Tramway over the Taringamotu River
- Native name: Taringamotu (Māori)

Location
- Country: New Zealand
- Region: Manawatū-Whanganui
- District: Ruapehu
- Settlements: Taringamotu

Physical characteristics
- Source: Hauhungaroa Range
  - location: Pureora Forest Park
  - coordinates: 38°45′11″S 175°31′1″E
  - elevation: 850 m (2,790 ft)
- Mouth: Ongarue River
  - location: Near Taumarunui
  - coordinates: 38°51′29″S 175°14′35″E
  - elevation: 170 m (560 ft)
- Length: 45 km (28 mi)

Basin features
- Progression: Taringamotu River → Ongarue River → Whanganui River
- River system: Whanganui River

The Taringamotu River is a river of the Manawatū-Whanganui region of New Zealand's North Island. It rises at the southern end of the Hauhungaroa Range, flowing generally west to meet the Ongarue River, part of the Whanganui River system, close to the town of Taumarunui.

== See also ==
- List of rivers of New Zealand
