= Taumarunui railway station =

Railway station in New Zealand

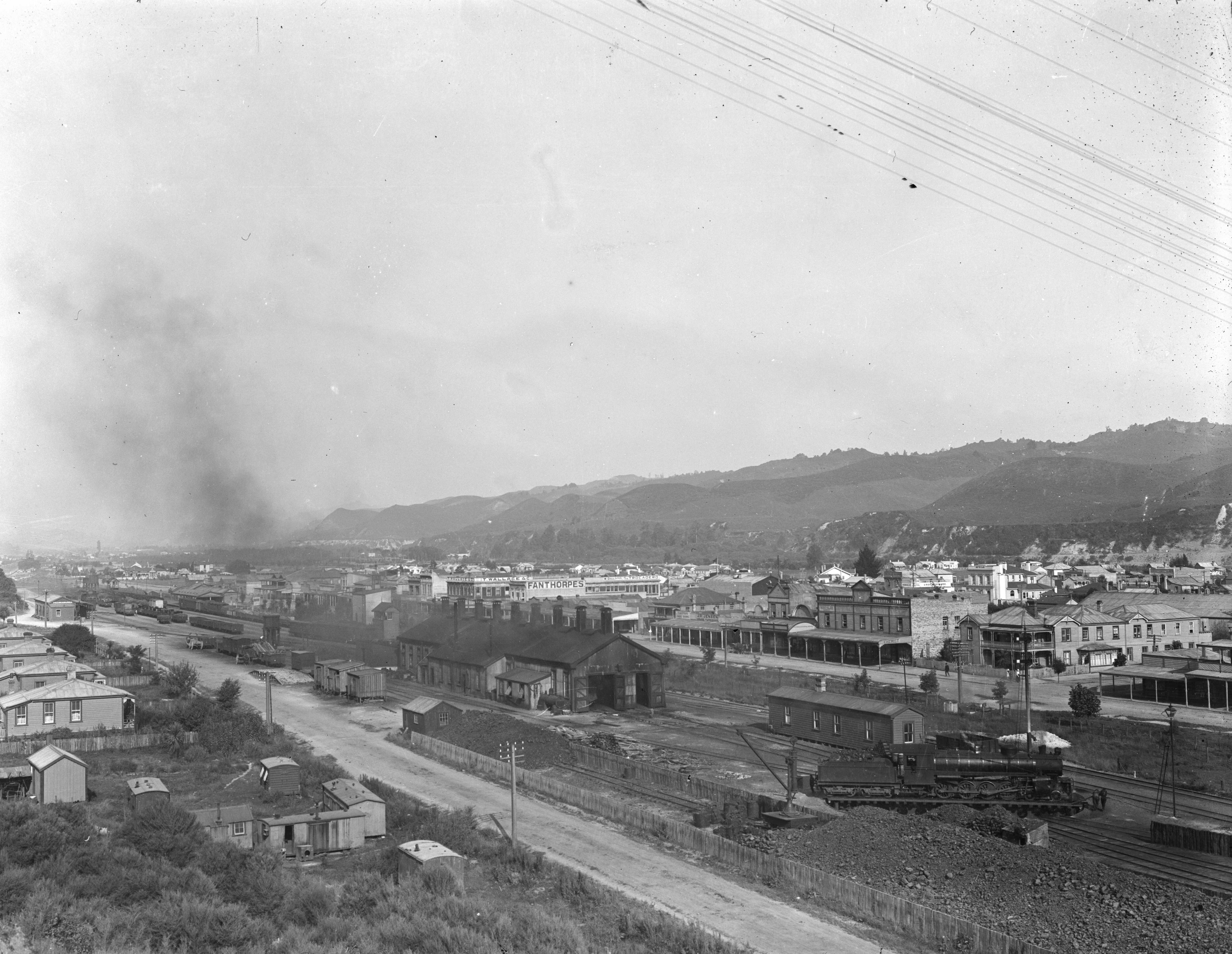
- 1916 view of station and yards

General information
- Location: Hakiaha Street, Taumarunui
- Coordinates: 38.8828°S 175.2648°E
- Elevation: 171 m (561 ft)
- Owner: KiwiRail
- Line: North Island Main Trunk
- Distance: Wellington 397.75 km (247.15 mi)
- Platforms: 1

Construction
- Platform levels: 1

History
- Opened: 1 December 1903
- Rebuilt: 4 December 2022
- Electrified: 25 kV 50 Hz AC June 1988

Services
Preceding station	Great Journeys New Zealand	Following station
Otorohanga towards Auckland Strand	Northern Explorer	National Park towards Wellington

Other services
Preceding station	Historical railways	Following station
Taringamotu; Line open, station closed 4.74 km (2.95 mi)	North Island Main Trunk; KiwiRail	Matapuna; Line open, station closed 2.95 km (1.83 mi)
Location

Taumarunui railway station is the main railway station in Taumarunui, New Zealand, serving the Northern Explorer service between Auckland and Wellington. Historically, it was an important intermediate stop with a refreshment room on the North Island Main Trunk line; the subject of the ballad "Taumarunui on the Main Trunk Line" by Peter Cape.

== History ==
In December 1900, the telephone line was extended to Taumarunui. Goods ran between Ongarue and Taumarunui from 2 February 1903, with the railway line opening on Friday 29 May 1903. Extension southward began with goods to Matapuna from 22 June 1903. On Tuesday 1 December 1903 the 28 mi 24 ch (45.5 km) line between Poro-O-Tarao and Taumarunui was transferred from the Public Works Department to New Zealand Railways.

The station building opened on 1 December 1903, and included a cattle-yard, engine-shed, and railway workers' cottages.

The prime minister, Sir Joseph Ward, addressed a crowd of several hundred at Taumarunui on Saturday 8 August 1908, when the first Wellington to Auckland train paused at the station. When regular through trains started on 9 November 1908, southbound passengers stayed overnight at Taumarunui. By 11 January 1909 the General Manager gave permission for passengers to sleep on the trains, owing to lack of accommodation at Taumarunui and Ohakune (for northbound passengers). As well as complaints about the quality and quantity of rooms, there was also praise for Taumarunui boarding houses and hotels. Through expresses started to call during the night at Taumarunui from 14 February 1909, with only 5 minutes at the station.

NIMT express trains began from 14 February 1909. Trains also ran to Stratford from 1933.

Refreshment rooms opened on 1 November 1909 and closed on 21 February 1975. In 1920 accommodation was provided for refreshment staff and in 1940 a hostel for female refreshment room staff was added.

The platform was extended in 1905 and alterations made to the stationmaster's house in 1908. By 1909, the station had a 30 ft (9.1 m) by 20 ft (6.1 m) goods shed, a loading bank, sheep yards, a crane, water service, coal accommodation, fixed signals, urinals and a passing loop for 98 wagons. Within 2 years, the goods shed had been doubled in length.

A 50 ft (15 m) turntable from Auckland was installed temporarily in 1902. It was replaced by one of 55 ft (17 m) in 1907 and again by one of 70 ft (21 m) in 1929, costing £3060. In 1903, an engine shed was moved from Poro-O-Tarao to Taumarunui.

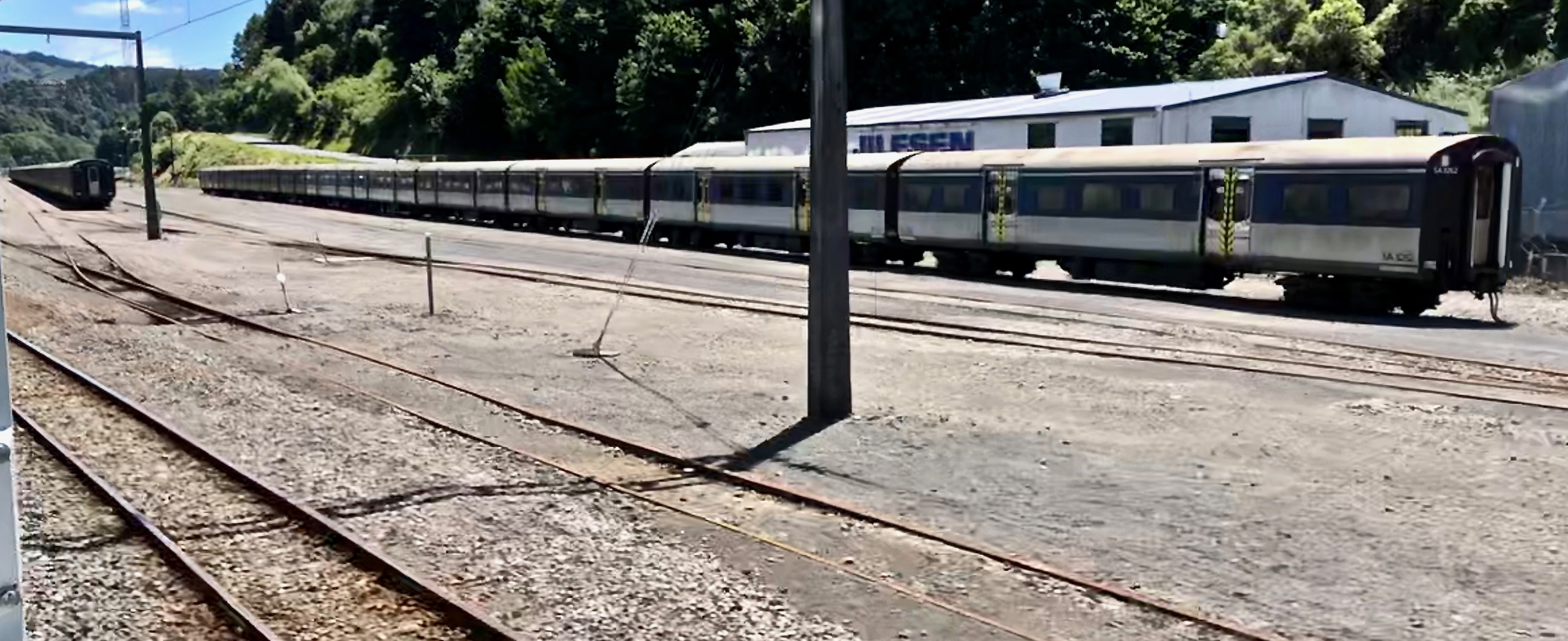
Over 30 SA and SD coaches remained in the sidings at the end of 2019

A new goods shed was built by Johnson Brothers Ltd for £30,000 in 1966. The original station was replaced by a two-storey building, officially opened by Prime Minister Robert Muldoon on 10 July 1977. The new building housed the Taumuranui C.T.C Train Control room until 1994 when train control was moved to Wellington. The new panel that was installed in 1986 controlled from Hamilton to Marton and featured in the 1988 Destinations production by NZR. When the electrification was installed on the N.I.M.T, a new lineside telephone system was installed that connected to the Taumuranui C.T.C room. In 2016 the sidings to the north of the station were used to stable 110 former Auckland trains, displaced by electrification. They were removed in 2025.

=== Services ===
Night Limited, New Plymouth Night Express, Scenic Daylight, Silver Star, Silver Fern, Blue Streak, Northerner and Overlander all stopped at the station. On Friday 21 January 1983 the last passenger train ran between New Plymouth and Taumarunui. The station closed on 25 June 2012, when the passenger stop was dropped from the Northern Explorer's schedule, except for pre-booked groups of 10+. The stop was reinstated from 4 December 2022.

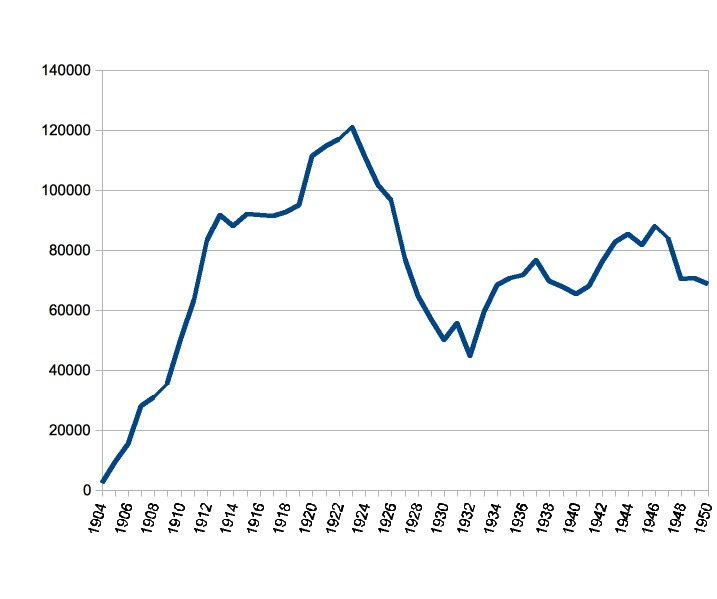
tickets sales 1904–1950 – derived from annual returns to Parliament of "Statement of Revenue for each Station for the Year ended"

As shown in the table and graph, passengers increased rapidly, reaching a peak in 1923.

year	tickets	season tickets	staff	source	title
1904	2,346		4	https://paperspast.natlib.govt.nz/parliamentary/appendix-to-the-journals-of-the-house-of-representatives/1904/I/1848	RETURN No. 12. STATEMENT of Revenue and Expenditure of each Station for the Year ended 31 March 1904
1905	9,218	2	6	https://paperspast.natlib.govt.nz/parliamentary/appendix-to-the-journals-of-the-house-of-representatives/1905/I/3767	RETURN No. 12. STATEMENT of Revenue and Expenditure of each Station for the Year ended 31 March 1905
1906	15,244		7	https://paperspast.natlib.govt.nz/parliamentary/appendix-to-the-journals-of-the-house-of-representatives/1906/II/1600	RETURN No. 12. STATEMENT of Revenue and Expenditure of each Station for the Year ended 31 March 1906
1907	27,761		7	https://paperspast.natlib.govt.nz/parliamentary/appendix-to-the-journals-of-the-house-of-representatives/1907/I/2542	RETURN No. 12. STATEMENT of Revenue and Expenditure of each Station for the Year ended 31 March 1907
1908	30,977		8	https://paperspast.natlib.govt.nz/parliamentary/appendix-to-the-journals-of-the-house-of-representatives/1908/I/2061	RETURN No. 12. STATEMENT of Revenue and Expenditure of each Station for the Year ended 31 March 1908
1909	35,130	6	13	https://paperspast.natlib.govt.nz/parliamentary/appendix-to-the-journals-of-the-house-of-representatives/1909/II/1832	RETURN No. 12. STATEMENT of Revenue and Expenditure of each Station for the Year ended 31 March 1909
1910	50,505	53	17	https://paperspast.natlib.govt.nz/parliamentary/appendix-to-the-journals-of-the-house-of-representatives/1910/I/2050	RETURN No. 12. STATEMENT of Revenue and Expenditure of each Station for the Year ended 31 March 1910
1911	63,358	33	17	https://paperspast.natlib.govt.nz/parliamentary/appendix-to-the-journals-of-the-house-of-representatives/1911/I/2497	RETURN No. 12. STATEMENT of Revenue and Expenditure of each Station for the Year ended 31 March 1911
1912	83,286	73	20	https://paperspast.natlib.govt.nz/parliamentary/appendix-to-the-journals-of-the-house-of-representatives/1912/II/2420	RETURN No. 12. STATEMENT of Revenue and Expenditure of each Station for the Year ended 31 March 1912
1913	91,612	99	22	https://paperspast.natlib.govt.nz/parliamentary/appendix-to-the-journals-of-the-house-of-representatives/1913/I/3693	RETURN No. 12. STATEMENT of Revenue and Expenditure of each Station for the Year ended 31 March 1913
1914	87,922	60		https://paperspast.natlib.govt.nz/parliamentary/appendix-to-the-journals-of-the-house-of-representatives/1914/I/2031	RETURN No. 12. Statement of Revenue for each Station for the Year ended 31 March 1914
1915	91,768	77		https://paperspast.natlib.govt.nz/parliamentary/appendix-to-the-journals-of-the-house-of-representatives/1915/I/1638	RETURN No. 12. Statement of Revenue for each Station for the Year ended 31 March 1915
1916	91,564	50		https://paperspast.natlib.govt.nz/parliamentary/appendix-to-the-journals-of-the-house-of-representatives/1916/I/1053	RETURN No. 12. Statement of Revenue for each Station for the Year ended 31 March 1916
1917	91,159	71		https://paperspast.natlib.govt.nz/parliamentary/appendix-to-the-journals-of-the-house-of-representatives/1917/I/1123	RETURN No. 12. Statement of Revenue for each Station for the Year ended 31 March 1917
1918	92,502	77		https://paperspast.natlib.govt.nz/parliamentary/appendix-to-the-journals-of-the-house-of-representatives/1918/I-II/1159	RETURN No. 12. Statement of Revenue for each Station for the Year ended 31 March 1918
1919	95,024	385		https://paperspast.natlib.govt.nz/parliamentary/appendix-to-the-journals-of-the-house-of-representatives/1919/I/1231	RETURN No. 12. Statement of Revenue for each Station for the Year ended 31 March 1919
1920	111,112	802		https://paperspast.natlib.govt.nz/parliamentary/appendix-to-the-journals-of-the-house-of-representatives/1920/I/1349	RETURN No. 12. Statement of Revenue for each Station for the Year ended 31 March 1920
1921	114,528	1,119		https://paperspast.natlib.govt.nz/parliamentary/appendix-to-the-journals-of-the-house-of-representatives/1921/I-II/1452	RETURN No. 12. Statement of Revenue for each Station for the Year ended 31 March 1921
1922	116,770	871		https://paperspast.natlib.govt.nz/parliamentary/appendix-to-the-journals-of-the-house-of-representatives/1922/I/1409	RETURN No. 12. Statement of Revenue for each Station for the Year ended 31 March 1922
1923	120,748	610		https://paperspast.natlib.govt.nz/parliamentary/appendix-to-the-journals-of-the-house-of-representatives/1923/I-II/1321	RETURN No. 12. Statement of Revenue for each Station for the Year ended 31 March 1923
1924	110,813	863		https://paperspast.natlib.govt.nz/parliamentary/appendix-to-the-journals-of-the-house-of-representatives/1924/I/2458	RETURN No. 12. Statement of Revenue for each Station for the Year ended 31 March 1924
1925	101,489	548		https://paperspast.natlib.govt.nz/parliamentary/appendix-to-the-journals-of-the-house-of-representatives/1925/I/1804	RETURN No. 12. Statement of Traffic and Revenue for each Station for the Year ended 31 March 1925
1926	96,509	1,002		https://paperspast.natlib.govt.nz/parliamentary/appendix-to-the-journals-of-the-house-of-representatives/1926/I/1930	STATEMENT No. 18 Statement of Traffic and Revenue for each Station for the Year ended 31 March 1926
1927	76,769	543		https://paperspast.natlib.govt.nz/parliamentary/appendix-to-the-journals-of-the-house-of-representatives/1927/I/2230	STATEMENT No. 18 Statement of Traffic and Revenue for each Station for the Year ended 31 March 1927
1928	64,646	527		https://paperspast.natlib.govt.nz/parliamentary/appendix-to-the-journals-of-the-house-of-representatives/1928/I/2628	STATEMENT No. 18 Statement of Traffic and Revenue for each Station for the Year ended 31 March 1928
1929	56,849	618		https://paperspast.natlib.govt.nz/parliamentary/appendix-to-the-journals-of-the-house-of-representatives/1929/I/2090	STATEMENT No. 18 Statement of Traffic and Revenue for each Station for the Year ended 31 March 1929
1930	49,965	503		https://paperspast.natlib.govt.nz/parliamentary/appendix-to-the-journals-of-the-house-of-representatives/1930/I/2212	STATEMENT No. 18 Statement of Traffic and Revenue for each Station for the Year ended 31 March 1930
1931	55,433	527		https://paperspast.natlib.govt.nz/parliamentary/appendix-to-the-journals-of-the-house-of-representatives/1931/I-II/1778	STATEMENT No. 18 Statement of Traffic and Revenue for each Station for the Year ended 31 March 1931
1932	44,602	599		https://paperspast.natlib.govt.nz/parliamentary/appendix-to-the-journals-of-the-house-of-representatives/1932/I-II/1934	STATEMENT No. 18 Statement of Traffic and Revenue for each Station for the Year ended 31 March 1932
1933	59,132	605		https://paperspast.natlib.govt.nz/parliamentary/appendix-to-the-journals-of-the-house-of-representatives/1933/I/1388	STATEMENT No. 18 Statement of Traffic and Revenue for each Station for the Year ended 31 March 1933
1934	68,178	781		https://paperspast.natlib.govt.nz/parliamentary/appendix-to-the-journals-of-the-house-of-representatives/1934/I/2278	STATEMENT No. 18 Statement of Traffic and Revenue for each Station for the Year ended 31 March 1934
1935	70,631	479		https://paperspast.natlib.govt.nz/parliamentary/appendix-to-the-journals-of-the-house-of-representatives/1935/I/1326	STATEMENT No. 18 Statement of Traffic and Revenue for each Station for the Year ended 31 March 1935
1936	71,523	464		https://paperspast.natlib.govt.nz/parliamentary/appendix-to-the-journals-of-the-house-of-representatives/1936/I/1552	STATEMENT No. 18 Statement of Traffic and Revenue for each Station for the Year ended 31 March 1936
1937	76,671	547		https://paperspast.natlib.govt.nz/parliamentary/appendix-to-the-journals-of-the-house-of-representatives/1937/I/1896	STATEMENT No. 18 Statement of Traffic and Revenue for each Station for the Year ended 31 March 1937
1938	69,608	344		https://paperspast.natlib.govt.nz/parliamentary/appendix-to-the-journals-of-the-house-of-representatives/1938/I/1652	STATEMENT No. 18 Statement of Traffic and Revenue for each Station for the Year ended 31 March 1938
1939	67,651	348		https://paperspast.natlib.govt.nz/parliamentary/appendix-to-the-journals-of-the-house-of-representatives/1939/I/1970	STATEMENT No. 18 Statement of Traffic and Revenue for each Station for the Year ended 31 March 1939
1940	65,131	419		https://paperspast.natlib.govt.nz/parliamentary/appendix-to-the-journals-of-the-house-of-representatives/1940/I/1314	STATEMENT No. 18 Statement of Traffic and Revenue for each Station for the Year ended 31 March 1940
1941	67,871	385		https://paperspast.natlib.govt.nz/parliamentary/appendix-to-the-journals-of-the-house-of-representatives/1941/I/1203	STATEMENT No. 18 Statement of Traffic and Revenue for each Station for the Year ended 31 March 1941
1942	75,886	308		https://paperspast.natlib.govt.nz/parliamentary/appendix-to-the-journals-of-the-house-of-representatives/1942/I/651	STATEMENT No. 18 Statement of Traffic and Revenue for each Station for the Year ended 31 March 1942
1943	82,526	415		https://paperspast.natlib.govt.nz/parliamentary/appendix-to-the-journals-of-the-house-of-representatives/1943/I/679	STATEMENT No. 18 Statement of Traffic and Revenue for each Station for the Year ended 31 March 1943
1944	85,289	425		https://paperspast.natlib.govt.nz/parliamentary/appendix-to-the-journals-of-the-house-of-representatives/1944/I/895	STATEMENT No. 18 Statement of Traffic and Revenue for each Station for the Year ended 31 March 1944
1945	81,617	346		https://paperspast.natlib.govt.nz/parliamentary/appendix-to-the-journals-of-the-house-of-representatives/1945/I/969	STATEMENT No. 18 Statement of Traffic and Revenue for each Station for the Year ended 31 March 1945
1946	88,039	384		https://paperspast.natlib.govt.nz/parliamentary/appendix-to-the-journals-of-the-house-of-representatives/1946/I/1548	STATEMENT No. 18 Statement of Traffic and Revenue for each Station for the Year ended 31 March 1946
1947	83,898	318		https://paperspast.natlib.govt.nz/parliamentary/appendix-to-the-journals-of-the-house-of-representatives/1947/I/2495	STATEMENT No. 18 Statement of Traffic and Revenue for each Station for the Year ended 31 March 1947
1948	70,357	269		https://paperspast.natlib.govt.nz/parliamentary/appendix-to-the-journals-of-the-house-of-representatives/1948/I/2521	STATEMENT No. 18 Statement of Traffic and Revenue for each Station for the Year ended 31 March 1948
1949	70,563	244		https://paperspast.natlib.govt.nz/parliamentary/appendix-to-the-journals-of-the-house-of-representatives/1949/I/2104	STATEMENT No. 18 Statement of Traffic and Revenue for each Station for the Year ended 31 March 1949
1950	68,741	245		https://paperspast.natlib.govt.nz/parliamentary/appendix-to-the-journals-of-the-house-of-representatives/1950/I/2366	STATEMENT No. 18 Statement of Traffic and Revenue for each Station for the Year ended 31 March 1950

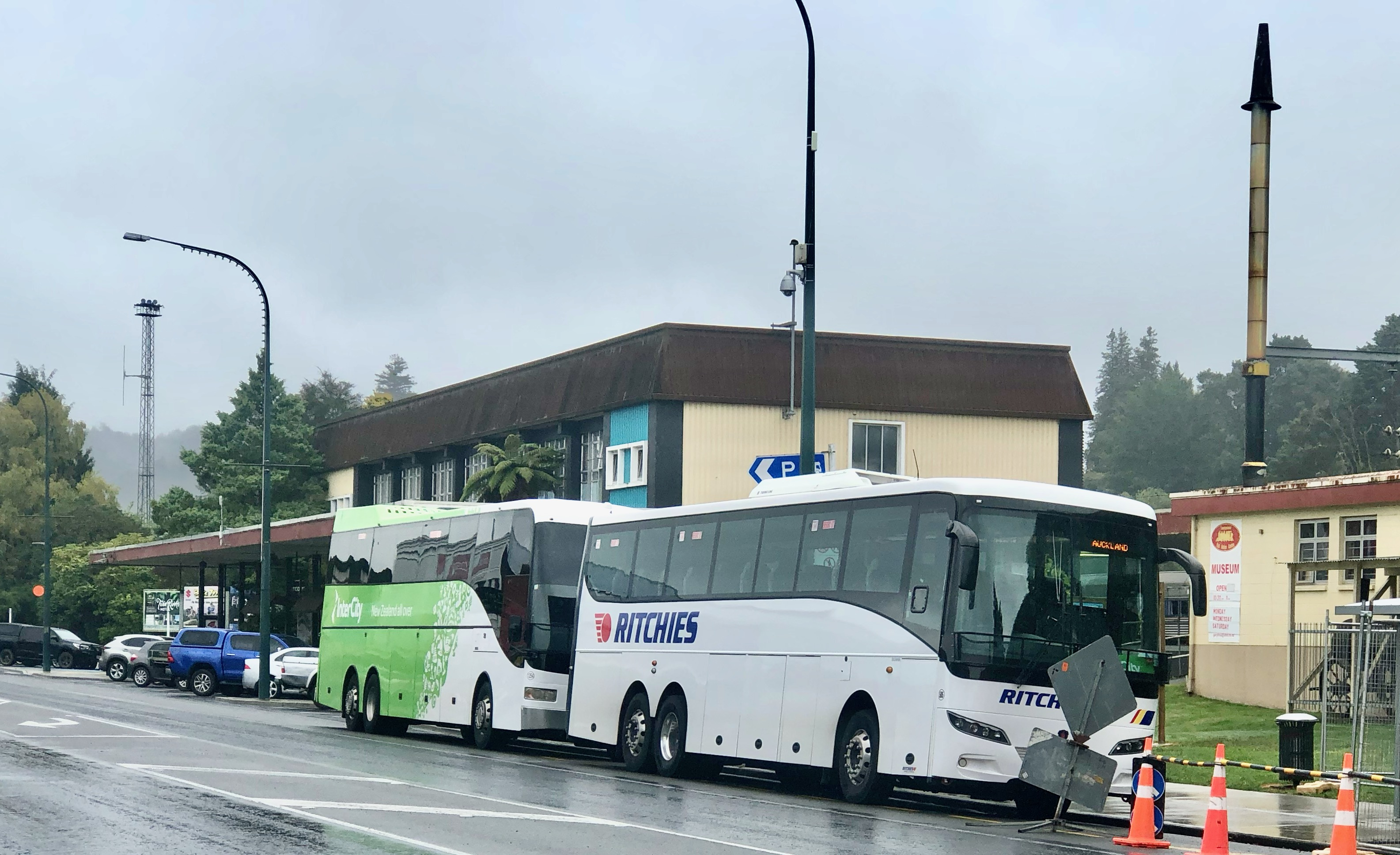
Buses stopped outside the station
