= Waimiha railway station =

Railway station in New Zealand

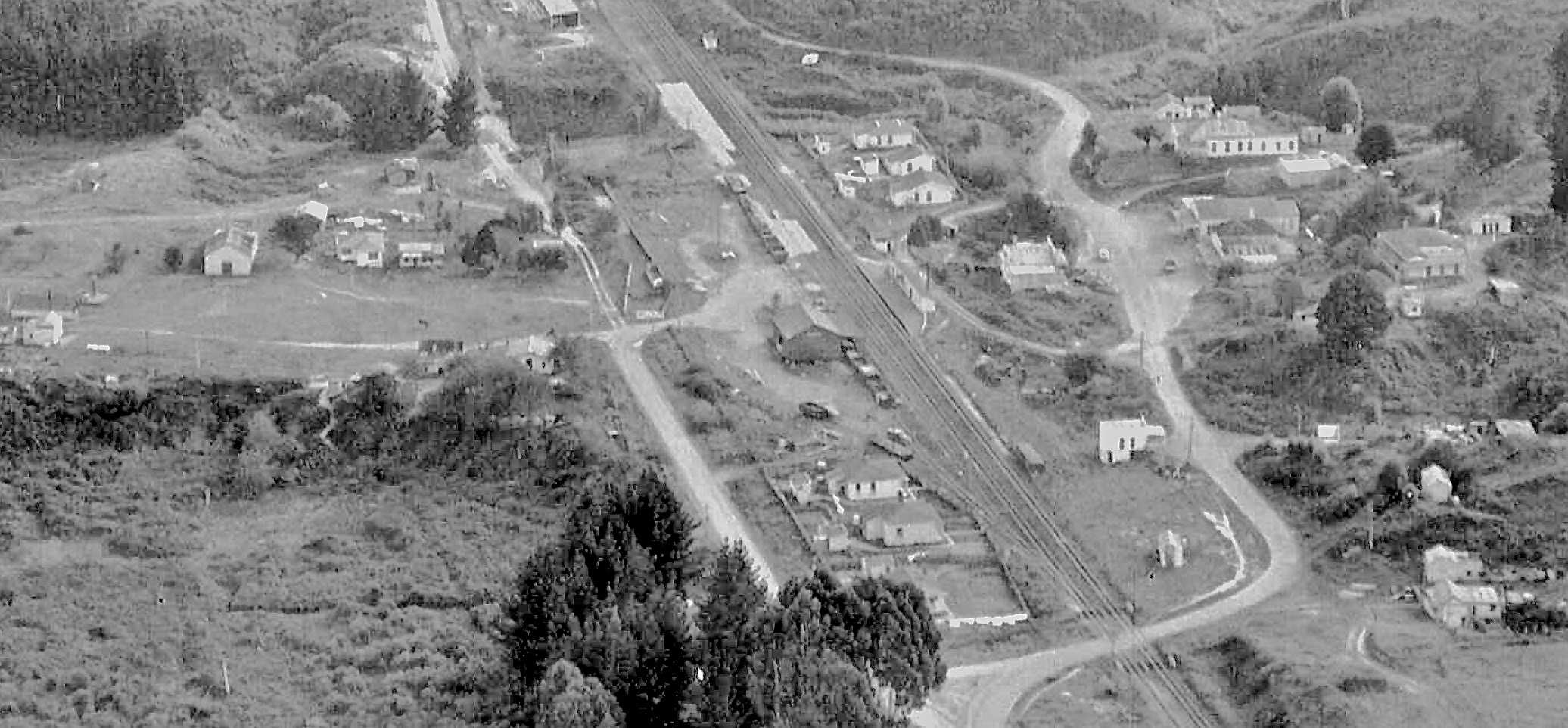
- Waimiha 1955

General information
- Location: New Zealand
- Coordinates: 38.6181°S 175.3102°E
- Elevation: 232 m (761 ft)
- Line: North Island Main Trunk
- Distance: Wellington 433.9 km (269.6 mi)

History
- Opened: 1 December 1903
- Closed: passenger before Dec 1975 goods 13 October 1986
- Electrified: June 1988

Services
Preceding station	Historical railways	Following station
Poro-O-Tarao; Line open, station closed 9.68 km (6.01 mi)	North Island Main Trunk; KiwiRail	Waione Siding; Line open, station closed 7.53 km (4.68 mi)
Location

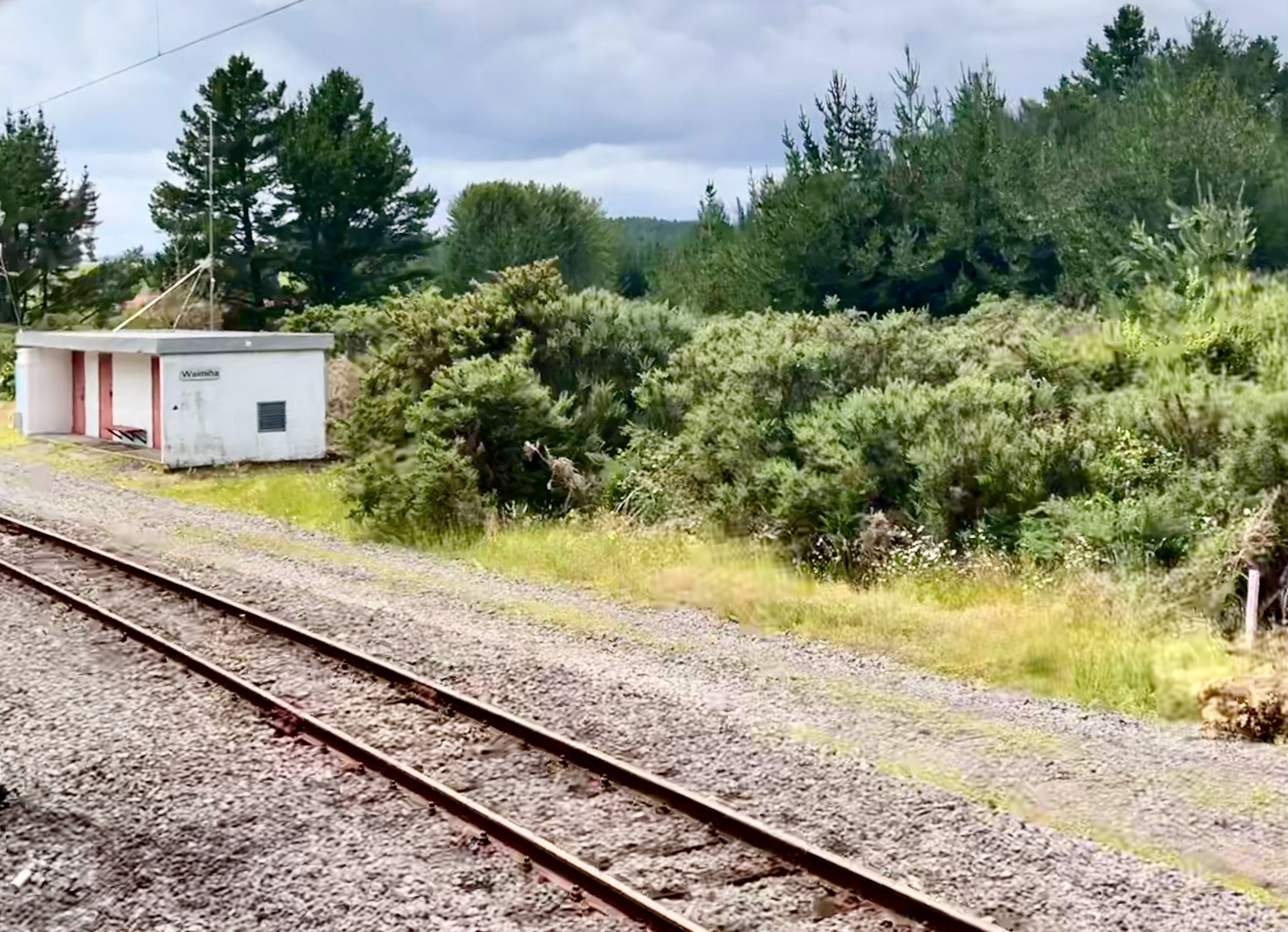
Waimiha in 2025

Waimiha was a flag station on the North Island Main Trunk line, in the Ruapehu District of New Zealand, serving the small village of Waimiha in the Ōngarue valley. Its site covered 6 acres (2.4 ha), with a shelter shed, platform, cart approach and loading bank. A goods shed was added about 1910. A passing loop could hold 42 wagons, extended to 80 wagons by 1980. The passing loop is still in use.

The rails reached Waimiha about Christmas 1900 and by 28 May 1901 it was reported that goods for workmen were being carried on the ballast trains. A railway worker's cottage was in place by 1902 and a house for second porter was mentioned in 1912. In 1913 a tramway link was agreed. In 1921 Rangataua Timber Co advertised for tenders for a mile of tramway. A telephone was connected in 1915. Further houses were built in the 1920s. From 20 June 1981 the station was unstaffed.
