= Taringamotu railway station =

Former railway station in New Zealand

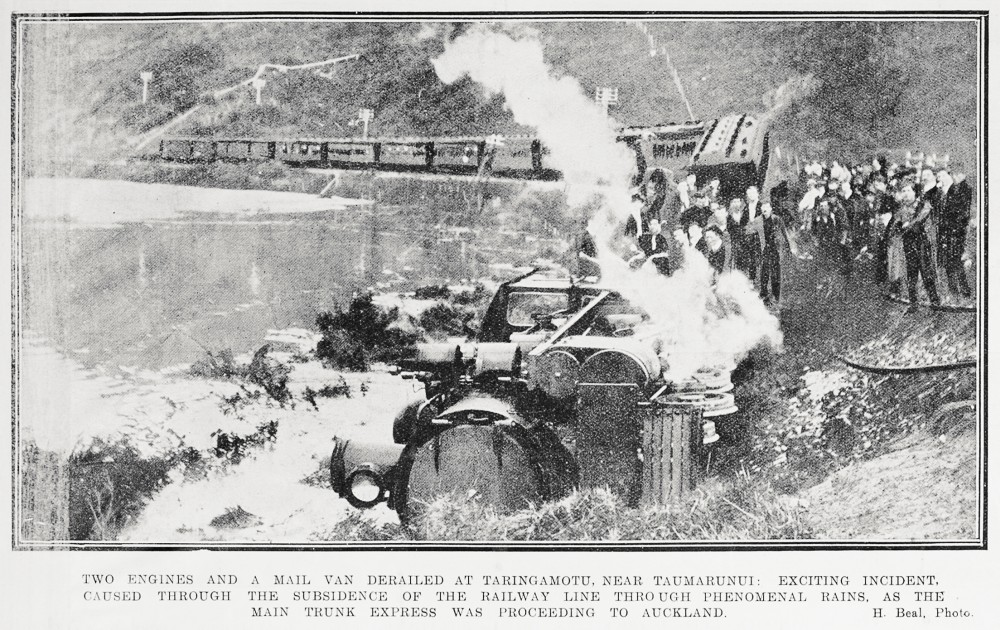
- Taringamotu derailment 1915

General information
- Location: New Zealand
- Coordinates: 38.85428°S 175.237513°E
- Elevation: 173 m (568 ft)
- Owner: KiwiRail
- Line: North Island Main Trunk
- Distance: Wellington 402.49 km (250.10 mi)
- Tracks: single

History
- Opened: 1 December 1903
- Closed: 16 April 1972 passengers 9 March 1987 goods
- Electrified: 25 kV 50 Hz AC June 1988
- Former names: Taringamutu until 7 August 1913

Services
Preceding station	Historical railways	Following station
Okahukura; Line open, station closed 6.05 km (3.76 mi)	North Island Main Trunk; KiwiRail	Taumarunui; Line open, station open 4.74 km (2.95 mi)
Location

Taringamotu railway station was a station at Taringamotu on the North Island Main Trunk, in the Ruapehu District and Manawatū-Whanganui region.

Goods traffic was reported to have started by November 1902. A station master was appointed in 1911. In 1920 he was working over 12 hours a day. In 1924 it was a 6th grade post. The stationmaster was withdrawn from 26 June 1926. Reports mention a caretaker being at the station in 1948 and 1951.

The name was changed from Taringamutu to Taringamotu after Alexander Young had described it as an error in Parliament in 1913.

In 1908 additions were made to the station buildings and a station house was built. By 1911 there was a shelter shed, platform, loading bank and a passing loop for 36 wagons. Electric lighting came in about 1936.

Timber was the main traffic, transferring from the Taringamotu Tramway, but the station also handled other goods, such as 122 tons of fertilisers in 1926. Taringamotu Totara Sawmills' private siding was 1 1/2 mi (2.4 km) south of the station.

In 1939 the line between Taumarunui and Taringamotu became the first in the country to get CTC, meaning that Taringamotu closed as a tablet station.

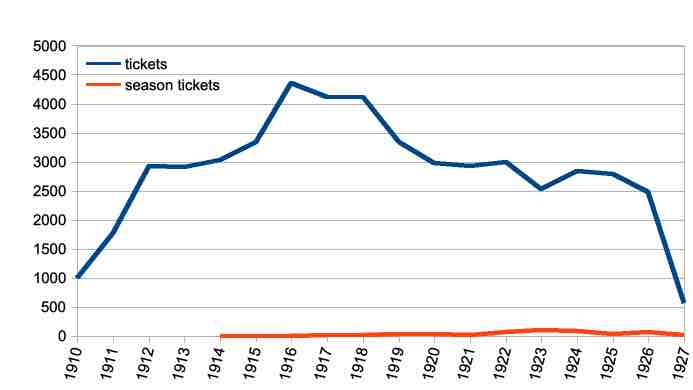
Taringamotu railway station passenger use 1910–1927

Passenger numbers rose rapidly until 1916, as shown in the table and graph below –

year	tickets	season tickets	staff	sources
1910	993		1	RETURN No. 12. STATEMENT of Revenue and Expenditure of each Station for the Year ended 31st March, 1910
1911	1,778		1	RETURN No. 12. STATEMENT of Revenue and Expenditure of each Station for the Year ended 31st March, 1911
1912	2,931	8	1	RETURN No. 12. STATEMENT of Revenue and Expenditure of each Station for the Year ended 31 March 1912
1913	2,904		1	RETURN No. 12. STATEMENT of Revenue and Expenditure of each Station for the Year ended 31 March 1913
1914	3,035	1		RETURN No. 12. Statement of Revenue for each Station for the Year ended 31 March 1914
1915	3,336	1		RETURN No. 12. Statement of Revenue for each Station for the Year ended 31 March 1915
1916	4,347	4		RETURN No. 12. Statement of Revenue for each Station for the Year ended 31 March 1916
1917	4,107	9		RETURN No. 12. Statement of Revenue for each Station for the Year ended 31 March 1917
1918	4,110	11		RETURN No. 12. Statement of Revenue for each Station for the Year ended 31 March 1918
1919	3,333	38		RETURN No. 12. Statement of Revenue for each Station for the Year ended 31 March 1919
1920	2,982	29		RETURN No. 12. Statement of Revenue for each Station for the Year ended 31 March 1920
1921	2,929	18		RETURN No. 12. Statement of Revenue for each Station for the Year ended 31 March 1921
1922	2,998	56		RETURN No. 12. Statement of Revenue for each Station for the Year ended 31 March 1922
1923	2,522	94		RETURN No. 12. Statement of Revenue for each Station for the Year ended 31 March 1923
1924	2,836	88		RETURN No. 12. Statement of Revenue for each Station for the Year ended 31 March 1924
1925	2,794	37		RETURN No. 12. Statement of Traffic and Revenue for each Station for the Year ended 31 March 1925
1926	2,476	60		STATEMENT No. 18 Statement of Traffic and Revenue for each Station for the Year ended 31 March 1926
1927	559	15		STATEMENT No. 18 Statement of Traffic and Revenue for each Station for the Year ended 31 March 1927

Taringamotu closed to all traffic from 16 April 1972. In 1974 the crossing loop was extended. The loop was closed on 9 March 1987.

There is now just a single track and a 2-span girder bridge over the Ongarue River.

== Incidents ==
The line wasn't fenced until 1909. In October 1905 a letter from 22 Māori farmers between Taumarunui and Taringamotu complained of the agreement to do so being broken, saying, "Fifteen horses have been killed, eight cows, and five pigs".

In 1915 the Ongarue River undermined a bank and two engines and a van, which had been moving very slowly, were overturned. One fireman had a minor hand, or head, injury.

Two goods trains crashed in 1943, with slight injuries to drivers and firemen.

Floods and slips closed the line nearby on several occasions. In 2015 the wooden bridge over the Ongarue River was replaced in concrete and mass stabilisation was applied to the nearby embankment.
