= Te Koura railway station =

Railway station in New Zealand

General information
- Location: New Zealand
- Coordinates: 38.7697°S 175.2473°E
- Elevation: 182 m (597 ft)
- Line: North Island Main Trunk
- Distance: Wellington 412.94 km (256.59 mi)

History
- Opened: 1 December 1903
- Closed: 10 October 1971
- Electrified: June 1988

Services
Preceding station	Historical railways	Following station
Ongarue; Line open, station closed	North Island Main Trunk; KiwiRail	Okahukura; Line open, station closed
Location

Te Koura was flag station on the North Island Main Trunk line, in the Ruapehu District of New Zealand in the Ōngarue valley. When opened in 1903 it had sidings, a platform and a goods shed, The line was useable from February 1903 and goods traffic started on 22 June 1903.

The station served a small settlement, which existed before the railway came and where about a mile of riverside terrace was cultivated. In 2013 meshblock 1030000, which includes Te Koura, had a population of 51 in 27 houses. Nearby Te Koura Marae has a memorial to victims of the 1918 flu epidemic.

In 1911 the new line to Stratford was planned to have its junction 1.5 mi (2.4 km) south of Te Koura. The junction opened in 1933 at Okahukura, 4.4 km (2.7 mi) to the south. In 1912 it was referred to as Te Koura Railway.

In 1964 the station had 3 railway houses alongside, but by 1972 only one was left.
