= Waione Siding railway station =

Railway station in New Zealand

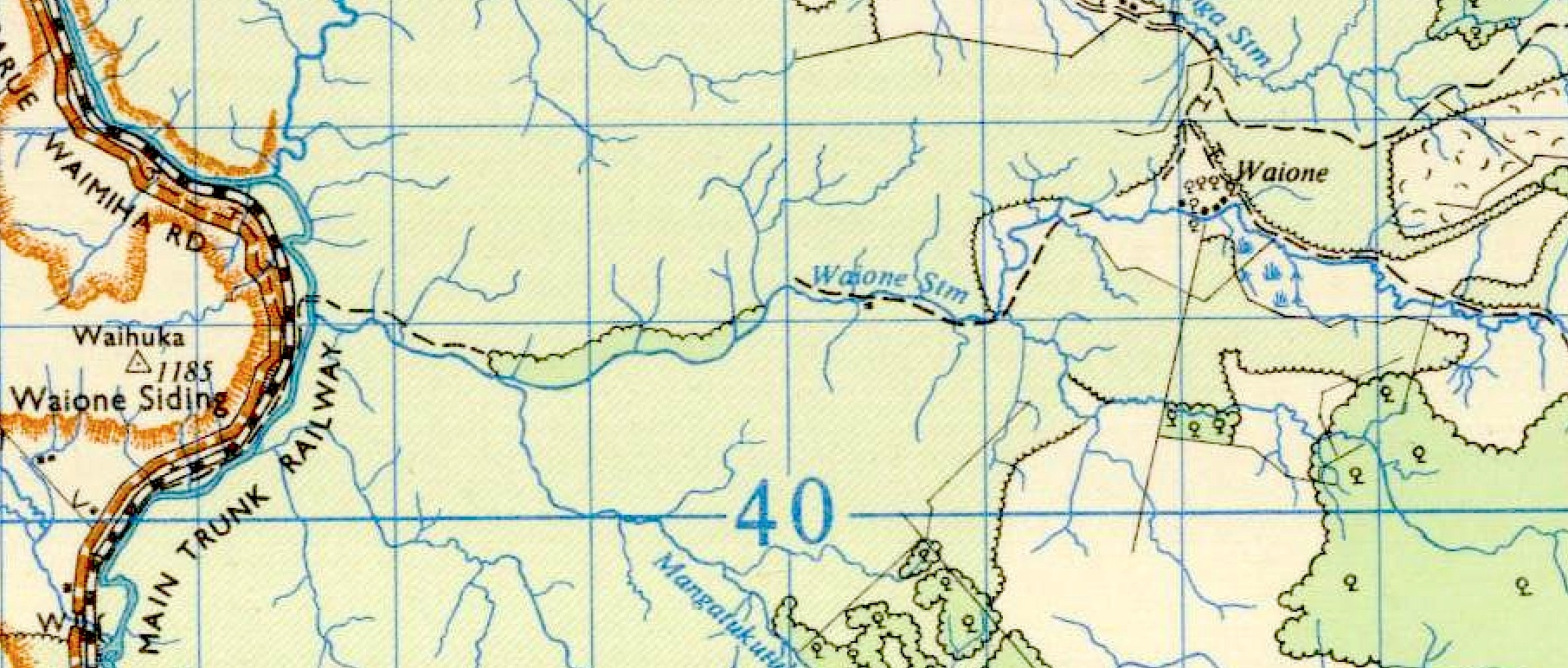
- Waione on 1956 edition of one inch map sheet N92

General information
- Location: New Zealand
- Coordinates: 38.6563°S 175.3159°E
- Elevation: 203 m (666 ft)
- Line: North Island Main Trunk
- Distance: Wellington 426.86 km (265.24 mi)

History
- Opened: 1 April 1917
- Closed: passenger 1 February 1918 goods 3 October 1948
- Electrified: June 1988

Services
Preceding station	Historical railways	Following station
Waimiha; Line open, station closed	North Island Main Trunk; KiwiRail	Ongarue; Line open, station closed
Location

Waione Siding was very briefly a stop on the North Island Main Trunk line, in the Ruapehu District of New Zealand in the Ōngarue valley. It was also known as Ninia.

It served a Marton Sash & Door Company tramway and was also a stop for occasional excursion trains. From 1928 the tramway was operated by a Price 16-wheeler steam locomotive. In 1927 a shelter shed was built. It was damaged by fire in 1950. In 1929 the siding became a tablet station, at a cost of about £4430.

The siding served a small settlement, where 23 people voted in 1928 and 22 in 1935. In 2013 meshblock 1042000, which includes the area west of the railway, had a population of 30 in 6 houses.
