= Ōhura =

Settlement in Manawatū-Whanganui Region, New Zealand

- Town
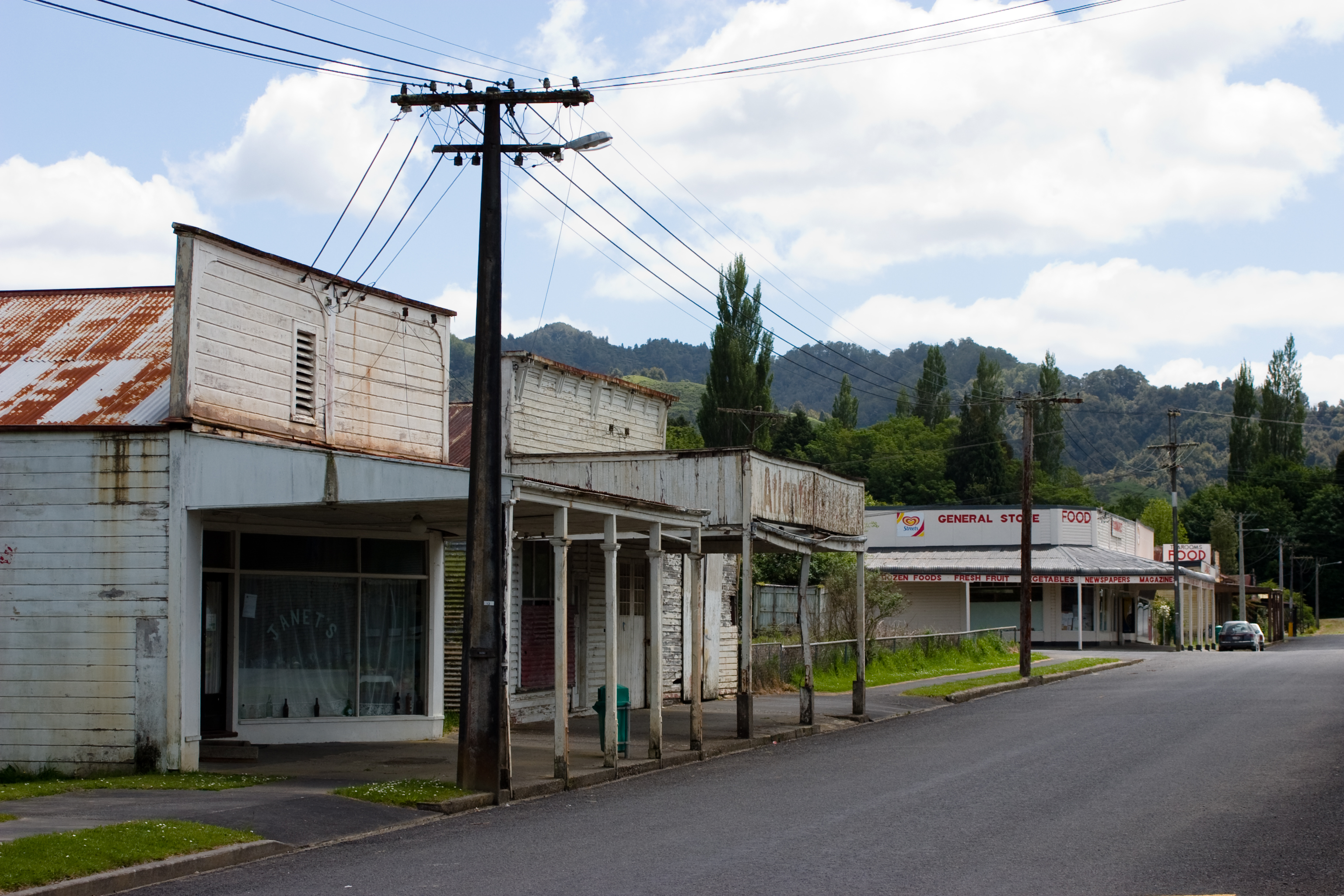
- Part of the Ōhura township
- Interactive map of Ōhura
- Coordinates: 38°50′35″S 174°58′55″E
- Country: New Zealand
- Region: Manawatū-Whanganui
- District: Ruapehu District
- Ward: Ruapehu General Ward; Ruapehu Māori Ward
- Community: Taumarunui-Ōhura Community
- Electorates: Taranaki-King Country; Te Tai Hauāuru (Māori)

Government
  - Territorial Authority: Ruapehu District Council
  - Regional council: Horizons Regional Council
  - Mayor of Ruapehu: Weston Kirton
  - Taranaki-King Country MP: Barbara Kuriger
  - Te Tai Hauāuru MP: Debbie Ngarewa-Packer

Area
  - Total: 2.79 km^{2} (1.08 sq mi)

Population (June 2025)
  - Total: 160
  - Density: 57/km^{2} (150/sq mi)

Ōhura is a small town in the west of the North Island of New Zealand. It is located to the west of Taumarunui in the area known as the King Country, in inland Manawatū-Whanganui. It lies on the banks of the Mangaroa Stream, a tributary of the Ōhura River which is a tributary of the Whanganui River.

== Background ==
The New Zealand Ministry for Culture and Heritage gives a translation of "place which is uncovered" for Ōhura. In July 2020, the name of the locality was officially gazetted as Ōhura by the New Zealand Geographic Board.

Ōhura was the centre for coal mining in the region, operating through to circa 1965, where previously the mines, railway network and farming had been major parts of the local industry.

Ōhura Memorial Hall opened in 1956.

The Ohura Museum provides a repository for much of the history of Ōhura and the surrounding area.

Te Rukirangi Marae and Papakainga meeting house is located in Ōhura. It is the tribal meeting ground of the Ngāti Maniapoto hapū of Te Rukirangi.

== Demographics ==
Ōhura is described by Statistics New Zealand as a rural settlement. It covers 2.79 km^{2} (1.08 sq mi) and had an estimated population of 160 as of June 2025, with a population density of 57 people per km^{2}. It is part of the larger Otangiwai-Ohura statistical area.

Historical population for Ōhura
Year	Pop.	±% p.a.
2006	162	—
2013	129	−3.20%
2018	126	−0.47%
2023	159	+4.76%
The 2006 population is for a larger area of 3.25 km^{2}. Source:

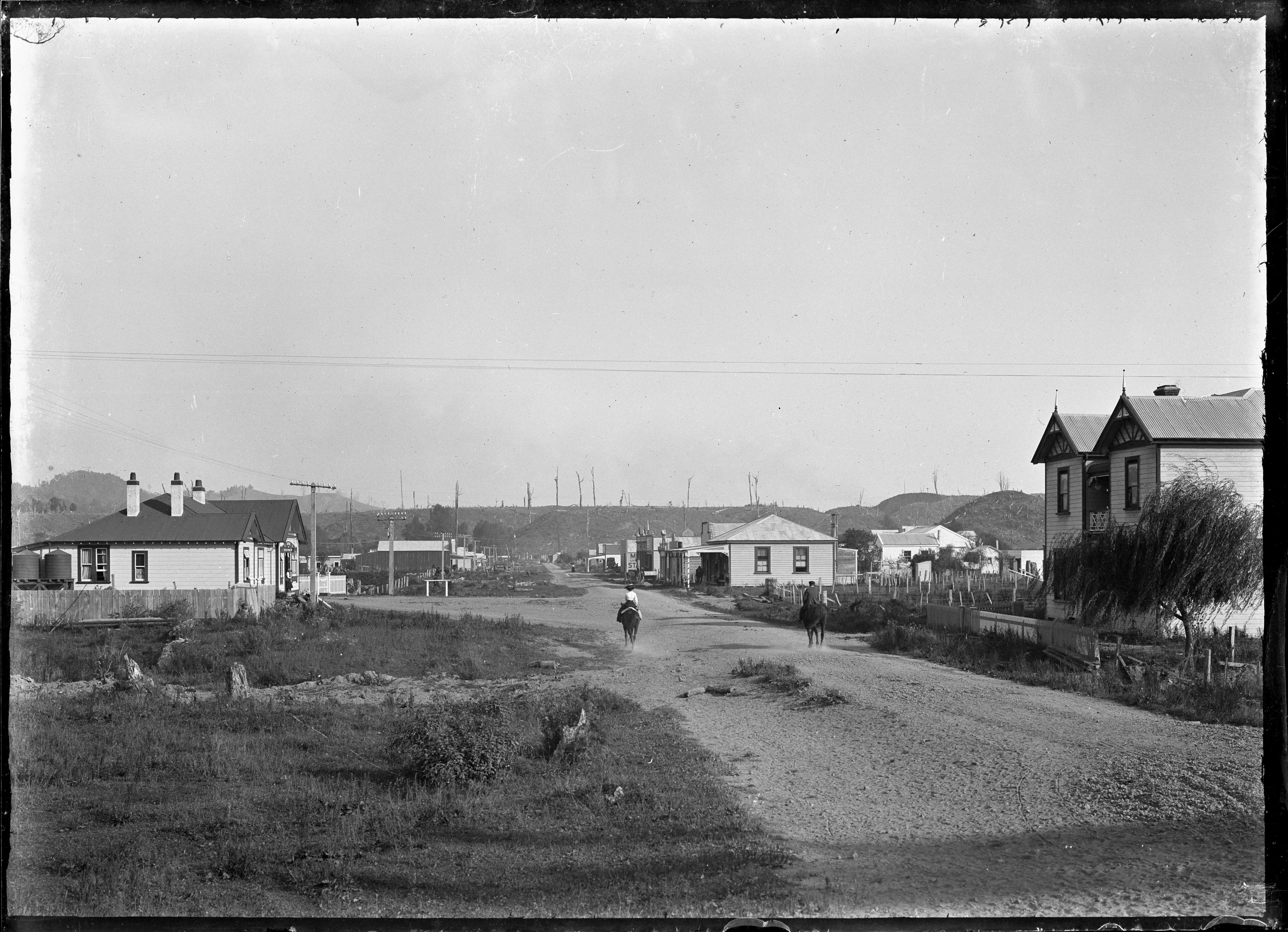
Ōhura about 1916

Ōhura had a population of 159 in the 2023 New Zealand census, an increase of 33 people (26.2%) since the 2018 census, and an increase of 30 people (23.3%) since the 2013 census. There were 84 males, 72 females, and 3 people of other genders in 93 dwellings. 1.9% of people identified as LGBTIQ+. The median age was 57.9 years (compared with 38.1 years nationally). There were 21 people (13.2%) aged under 15 years, 9 (5.7%) aged 15 to 29, 72 (45.3%) aged 30 to 64, and 54 (34.0%) aged 65 or older.

People could identify as more than one ethnicity. The results were 84.9% European (Pākehā), 18.9% Māori, and 5.7% Pasifika. English was spoken by 98.1%, Māori by 5.7%, and other languages by 5.7%. No language could be spoken by 1.9% (e.g. too young to talk). The percentage of people born overseas was 17.0, compared with 28.8% nationally.

Religious affiliations were 32.1% Christian, 1.9% Hindu, 1.9% Māori religious beliefs, and 1.9% other religions. People who answered that they had no religion were 43.4%, and 17.0% of people did not answer the census question.

Of those at least 15 years old, 12 (8.7%) people had a bachelor's or higher degree, 66 (47.8%) had a post-high school certificate or diploma, and 63 (45.7%) people exclusively held high school qualifications. The median income was $24,100, compared with $41,500 nationally. 3 people (2.2%) earned over $100,000 compared to 12.1% nationally. The employment status of those at least 15 was 42 (30.4%) full-time, 18 (13.0%) part-time, and 3 (2.2%) unemployed.

=== Otangiwai-Ohura statistical area ===
Otangiwai-Ohura statistical area covers 2,011.70 km^{2} (776.72 sq mi) and had an estimated population of 1,060 as of June 2025, with a population density of 0.53 people per km^{2}.

Historical population for Otangiwai-Ōhura
Year	Pop.	±% p.a.
2006	1,233	—
2013	1,086	−1.80%
2018	1,020	−1.25%
2023	1,077	+1.09%

Otangiwai-Ōhura had a population of 1,077 in the 2023 New Zealand census, an increase of 57 people (5.6%) since the 2018 census, and a decrease of 9 people (−0.8%) since the 2013 census. There were 570 males, 501 females, and 3 people of other genders in 480 dwellings. 1.9% of people identified as LGBTIQ+. The median age was 41.7 years (compared with 38.1 years nationally). There were 213 people (19.8%) aged under 15 years, 156 (14.5%) aged 15 to 29, 504 (46.8%) aged 30 to 64, and 204 (18.9%) aged 65 or older.

People could identify as more than one ethnicity. The results were 80.2% European (Pākehā); 31.8% Māori; 0.8% Pasifika; 3.1% Asian; 0.3% Middle Eastern, Latin American and African New Zealanders (MELAA); and 3.6% other, which includes people giving their ethnicity as "New Zealander". English was spoken by 98.1%, Māori by 7.5%, and other languages by 4.5%. No language could be spoken by 1.9% (e.g. too young to talk). New Zealand Sign Language was known by 0.6%. The percentage of people born overseas was 9.2, compared with 28.8% nationally.

Religious affiliations were 27.0% Christian, 0.3% Hindu, 2.5% Māori religious beliefs, 0.3% Buddhist, 0.6% New Age, and 0.8% other religions. People who answered that they had no religion were 56.8%, and 12.0% of people did not answer the census question.

Of those at least 15 years old, 108 (12.5%) people had a bachelor's or higher degree, 498 (57.6%) had a post-high school certificate or diploma, and 252 (29.2%) people exclusively held high school qualifications. The median income was $30,900, compared with $41,500 nationally. 36 people (4.2%) earned over $100,000 compared to 12.1% nationally. The employment status of those at least 15 was 444 (51.4%) full-time, 132 (15.3%) part-time, and 33 (3.8%) unemployed.

== Education ==
Ohura Valley Primary is a co-educational state primary school for Year 1 to 8 students, with a roll of 12 as of July 2026. The school opened in 1907 or 1908. It merged with the district high school to become Ohura Area School, and became a primary school only at the beginning of 1999.

== Ohura County Council ==
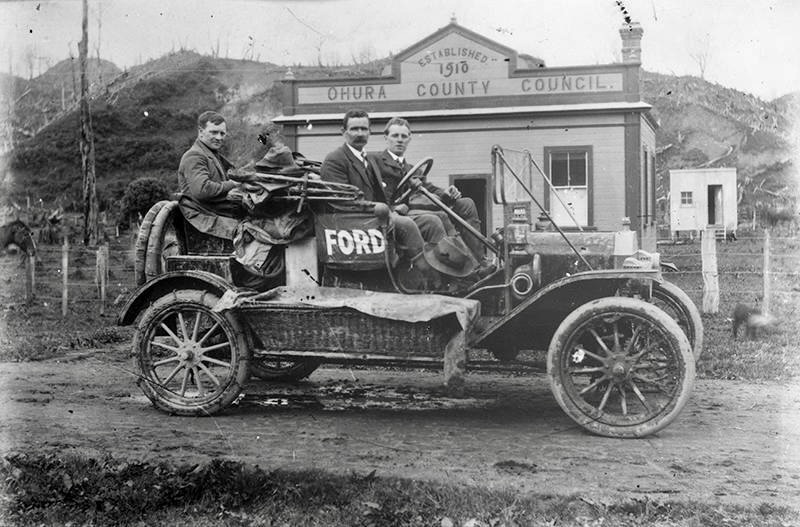
Ohura County office 1912

Ohura County Council was formed from Waitomo County by the Ohura County Act 1908. It had earlier been part of Taranaki County. It was bounded by Awakino County and Clifton County to the west, Waitomo County to the north, Taumarunui County to the east and Whangamomona County and Kaitieke County to the south. In 1908 its boundaries were defined by roads, rivers and streams. The 1906 population of the county was 1,226 and in 1956 was 1,893. The first meeting was on Monday 27 September 1909. It was agreed future meetings would be on the Wednesday closest to a full moon, which continued as the meeting date for at least a decade. Ohura Town Board was created in 1918 from an area formerly part of the county. In 1955 the Municipal Corporations Act 1954 renamed all Town Boards as Town Councils. In 1976 the Ohura Town Council also merged into Taumarunui County, as Ohura County had done in 1956, when Kaitieke also merged with Taumarunui.

== Ōhura railway station ==
Ōhura railway station
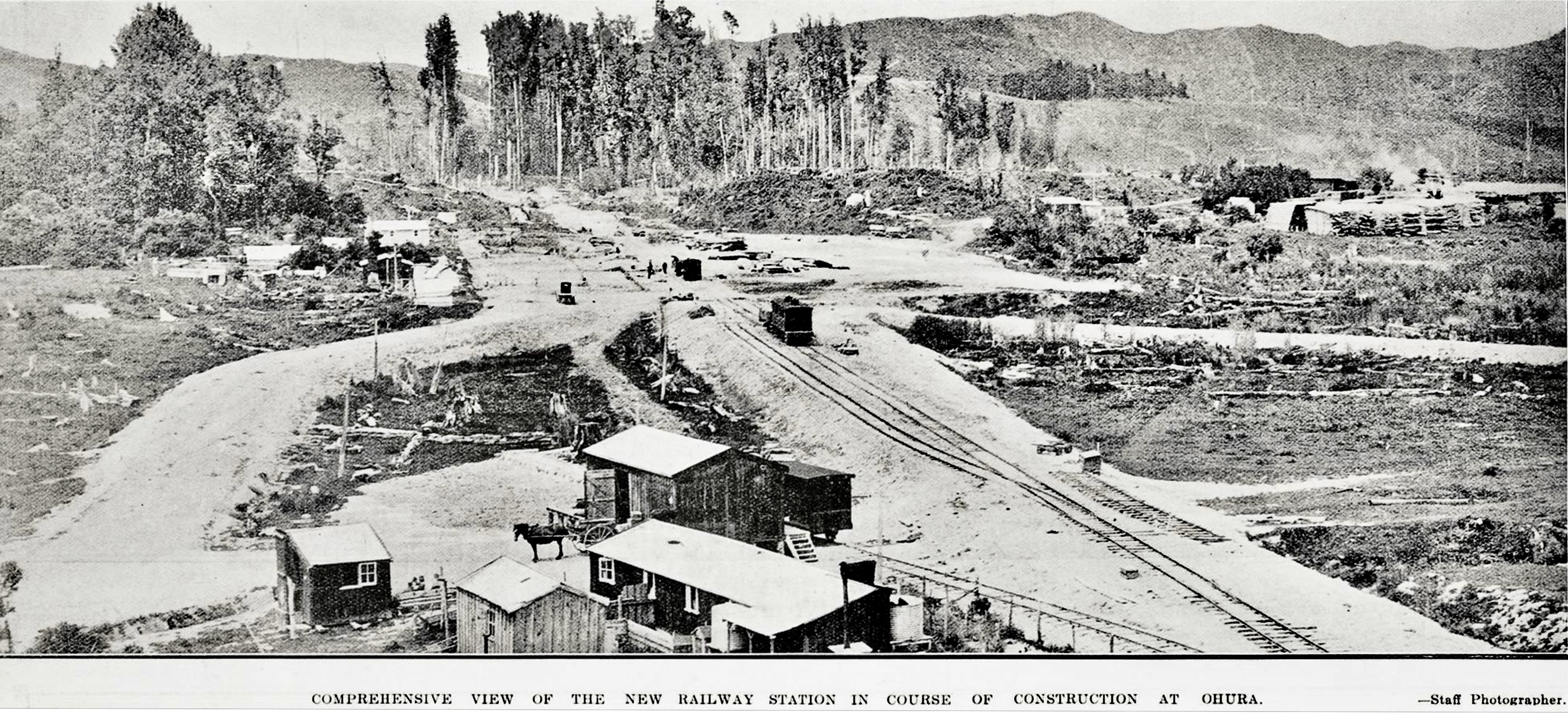
- Ōhura railway station in 1927

General information
- Location: New Zealand
- Elevation: 151 m (495 ft)
- Line: Stratford–Okahukura Line

History
- Opened: 4 September 1933
- Closed: Passengers 21 January 1983; Goods 9 November 2009

Services
Preceding station	Historical railways	Following station
Mangaparo; Line open for Forgotten World Adventures, station closed 4.7 km (2.9 mi) towards Stratford	Stratford–Okahukura Line; NZR	Waitewhena; Line open for Forgotten World Adventures, station closed 2.09 km (1.30 mi) towards Okahukura
Location

Ōhura had passenger and goods trains on the Stratford–Okahukura Line run by the Public Works Department (PWD) from 18 December 1926, when the Public Works Minister, Kenneth Williams, officially opened the Okahukura line, from its previous railhead at Toi Toi. In 1927 Carroll & O'Reilly started building the 40 ft (12 m) x 30 ft (9.1 m) goods shed, cart access, loading bank (extended for 4 wagons in 1959) and stockyards for £1168 and in 1928 S Bone started work on the station buildings for £9689. The Mayors of Taumarunui and Stratford held the ribbon on 7 November 1932, when the last spike was driven at Heao by the Prime Minister, George Forbes, and the Minister of Public Works, Gordon Coates, then drove the first train as the ribbon was cut.

Ōhura was no longer a terminal once the final 31.4 km (19.5 mi) Tāngarākau–Ōhura section, including 12 tunnels, opened on Monday, 12 December 1932 and trains began running the length of the line, though limited to 20 mph (32 km/h) on the new section. On Monday, 4 September 1933 New Zealand Railways (NZR) took over the Tahora–Okahukura section from PWD. A mixed train ran each way and overnight trains stopped at Ōhura in the middle of the night, on their almost 12-hour journeys between New Plymouth and Auckland, with a sleeping car included in their trains.

Ōhura had a stationmaster and there was an engine shed, a passing loop for 66 wagons and 2 railway houses were added in 1956. The houses were sold to the Housing Corporation in 1983. Mixed trains and Auckland-New Plymouth railcars called at Ōhura until they stopped running in 1970 and 1971 respectively, after which a daily New Plymouth–Taumarunui return trip, usually a DC locomotive, coach and van (though sometimes a railcar), carried newspapers, mail, parcels, small goods lots and an average of around a dozen passengers on weekdays until it stopped running on 21 January 1983. As late as 1980 NZR employed 16 at Ōhura.

A 48 ha (120 acres) water supply reserve, which supplied water for the steam engines and railway accommodation, was transferred to the Department of Conservation in 1996.

Between 1988 and 2013 all the station buildings were removed and only the passing loop remains. Some Forgotten World Adventures rail carts call at Ōhura. The rail carts started running in 2012 and had about 20,000 passengers to 2017.

== Notable people ==
- Frank Glasgow, All Black rugby player

== See also ==
- Ōhura prison
