= Maramataha River =

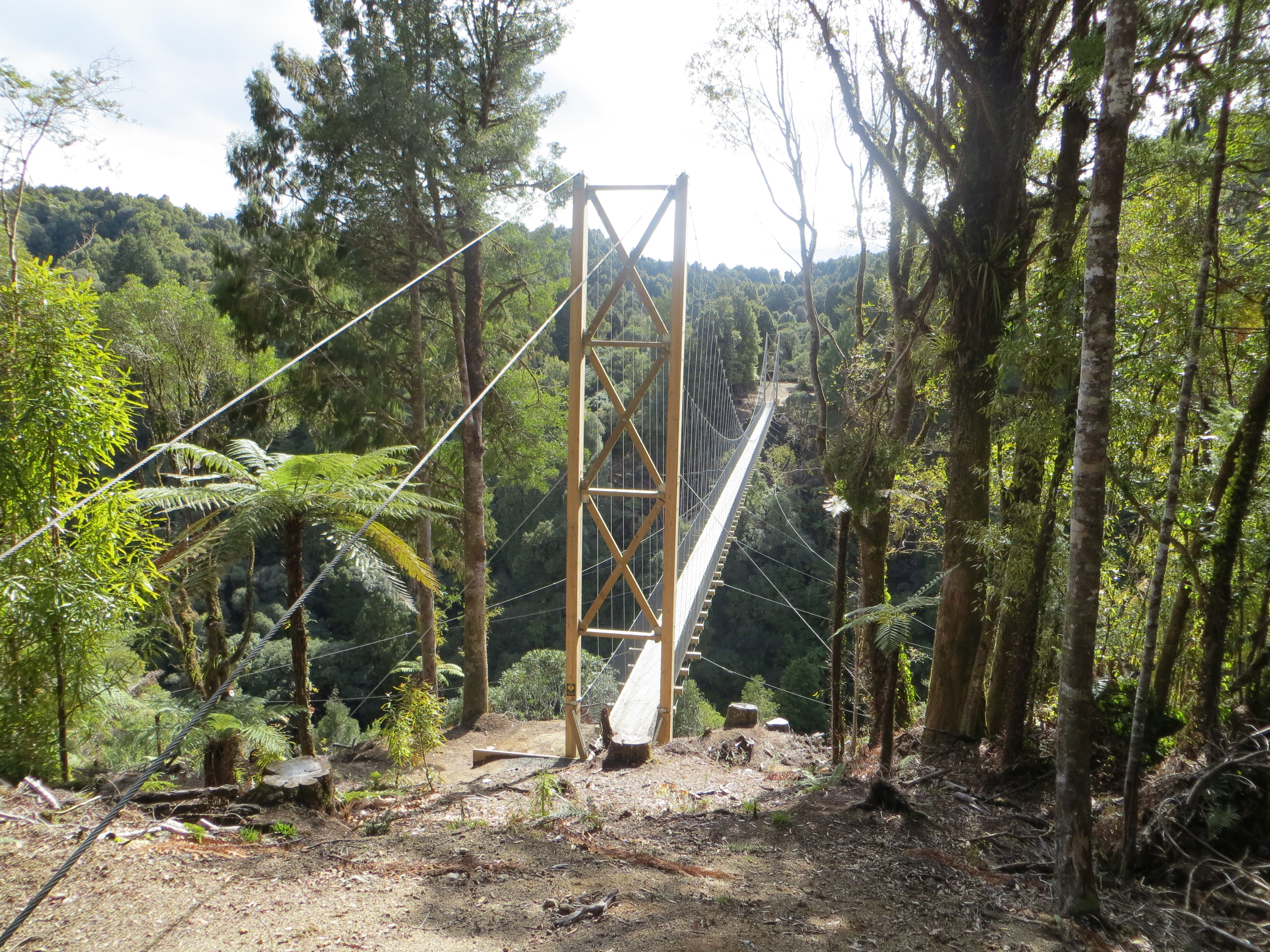
- Maramataha suspension bridge carrying the Timber Trail over the Maramataha River
- Native name: Maramataha (Māori)

Location
- Country: New Zealand
- Region: Manawatū-Whanganui
- District: Ruapehu

Physical characteristics
- Source: Hauhungaroa Range
  - location: Pureora Forest Park
  - coordinates: 38°39′7″S 175°34′41″E
  - elevation: 900 m (3,000 ft)
- Mouth: Ongarue River
  - coordinates: 38°39′14″S 175°18′58″E
  - elevation: 190 m (620 ft)
- Length: 39 km (24 mi)

Basin features
- Progression: Maramataha River → Ongarue River → Whanganui River
- River system: Whanganui River

The Maramataha River is a river in the Manawatū-Whanganui region of New Zealand. The river rises west of Lake Taupō and flows generally west to become a tributary of the Ongarue River.

== See also ==
- List of rivers of New Zealand
