= Taringamotu =

- Rural community
- Interactive map of Taringamotu
- Coordinates: 38.849°S 175.257°E
- Country: New Zealand
- Region: Manawatū-Whanganui
- District: Ruapehu District
- Ward: Ruapehu General Ward; Ruapehu Māori Ward
- Community: Taumarunui-Ōhura Community
- Electorates: Taranaki-King Country; Te Tai Hauāuru (Māori)

Government
  - Territorial Authority: Ruapehu District Council
  - Regional council: Horizons Regional Council
  - Mayor of Ruapehu: Weston Kirton
  - Taranaki-King Country MP: Barbara Kuriger
  - Te Tai Hauāuru MP: Debbie Ngarewa-Packer

Area
  - Total: 25.61 km^{2} (9.89 sq mi)

Population (2023 Census)
  - Total: 153
  - Density: 5.97/km^{2} (15.5/sq mi)

Taringamotu is a valley and rural community in the Ruapehu District and Manawatū-Whanganui region of New Zealand's North Island.

It is located northwest of Taumarunui, and north of State Highway 41.

The local Hia Kaitupeka marae is a tribal meeting ground of the Ngāti Maniapoto hapū of Hari and Te Kanawa, and the Ngāti Hāua hapū of Ngāti Hira. It includes the Hari meeting house.

== Demographics ==
Taringamotu locality covers 25.61 km^{2} (9.89 sq mi). It is part of the larger Ngapuke statistical area.

Historical population
Year	Pop.	±% p.a.
2006	117	—
2013	126	+1.06%
2018	126	+0.00%
2023	153	+3.96%

Taringamotu had a population of 153 in the 2023 New Zealand census, an increase of 27 people (21.4%) since the 2018 census, and an increase of 27 people (21.4%) since the 2013 census. There were 81 males and 75 females in 66 dwellings. The median age was 46.1 years (compared with 38.1 years nationally). There were 27 people (17.6%) aged under 15 years, 21 (13.7%) aged 15 to 29, 66 (43.1%) aged 30 to 64, and 42 (27.5%) aged 65 or older.

People could identify as more than one ethnicity. The results were 74.5% European (Pākehā), 43.1% Māori, 2.0% Pasifika, and 2.0% Asian. English was spoken by 100.0%, and Māori by 7.8%. The percentage of people born overseas was 7.8, compared with 28.8% nationally.

Religious affiliations were 39.2% Christian, and 2.0% Māori religious beliefs. People who answered that they had no religion were 47.1%, and 11.8% of people did not answer the census question.

Of those at least 15 years old, 6 (4.8%) people had a bachelor's or higher degree, 81 (64.3%) had a post-high school certificate or diploma, and 42 (33.3%) people exclusively held high school qualifications. The median income was $33,700, compared with $41,500 nationally. 9 people (7.1%) earned over $100,000 compared to 12.1% nationally. The employment status of those at least 15 was 57 (45.2%) full-time, 21 (16.7%) part-time, and 3 (2.4%) unemployed.

== Education ==
Ngakonui Valley School is a co-educational state primary school for Year 1 to 8 students, with a roll of 50 as of July 2026. It opened in 1919.

== See also ==
- Taringamotu railway station
- Taringamotu Tramway
