= Taringamotu Tramway =

Coordinates: 38.823511°S 175.445298°E

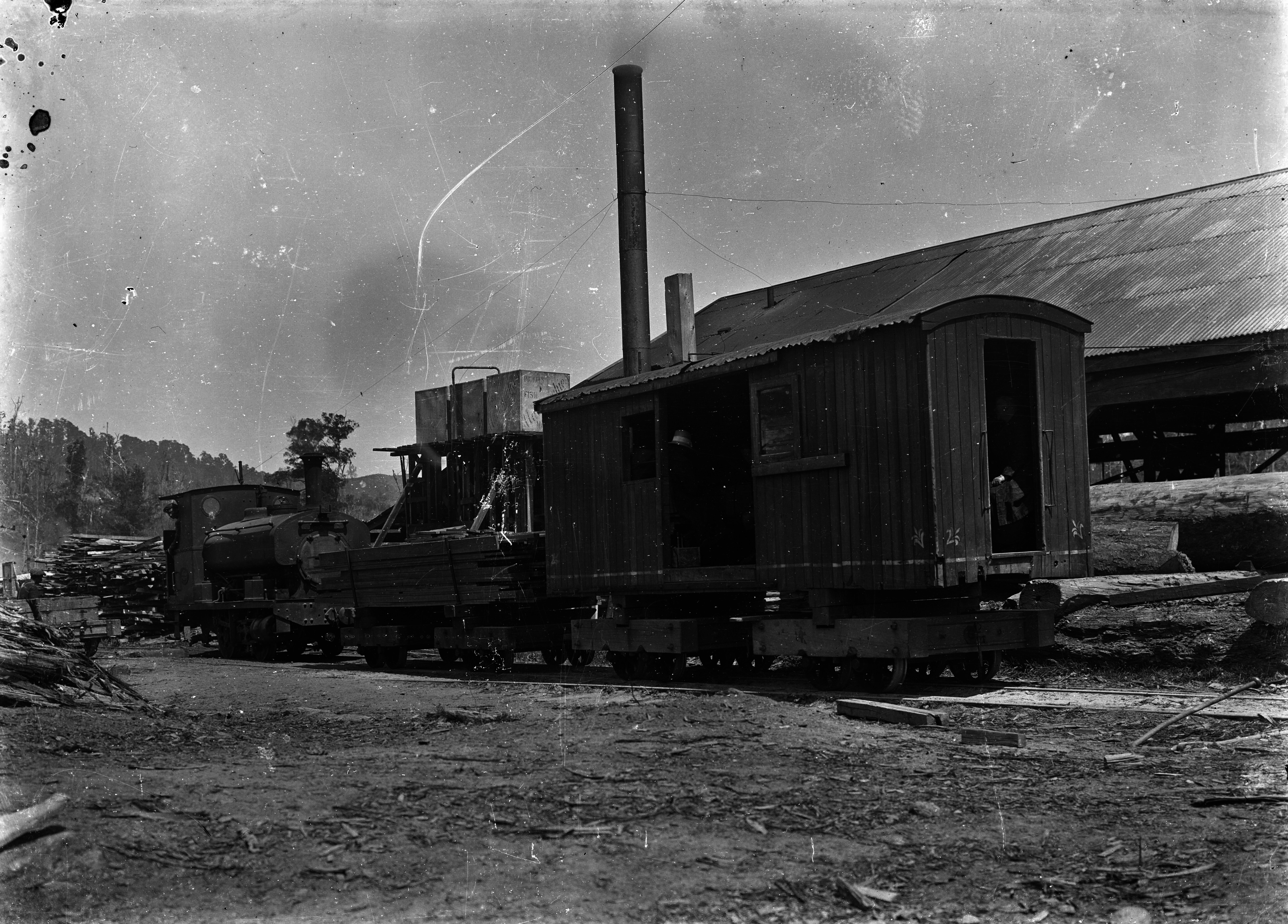
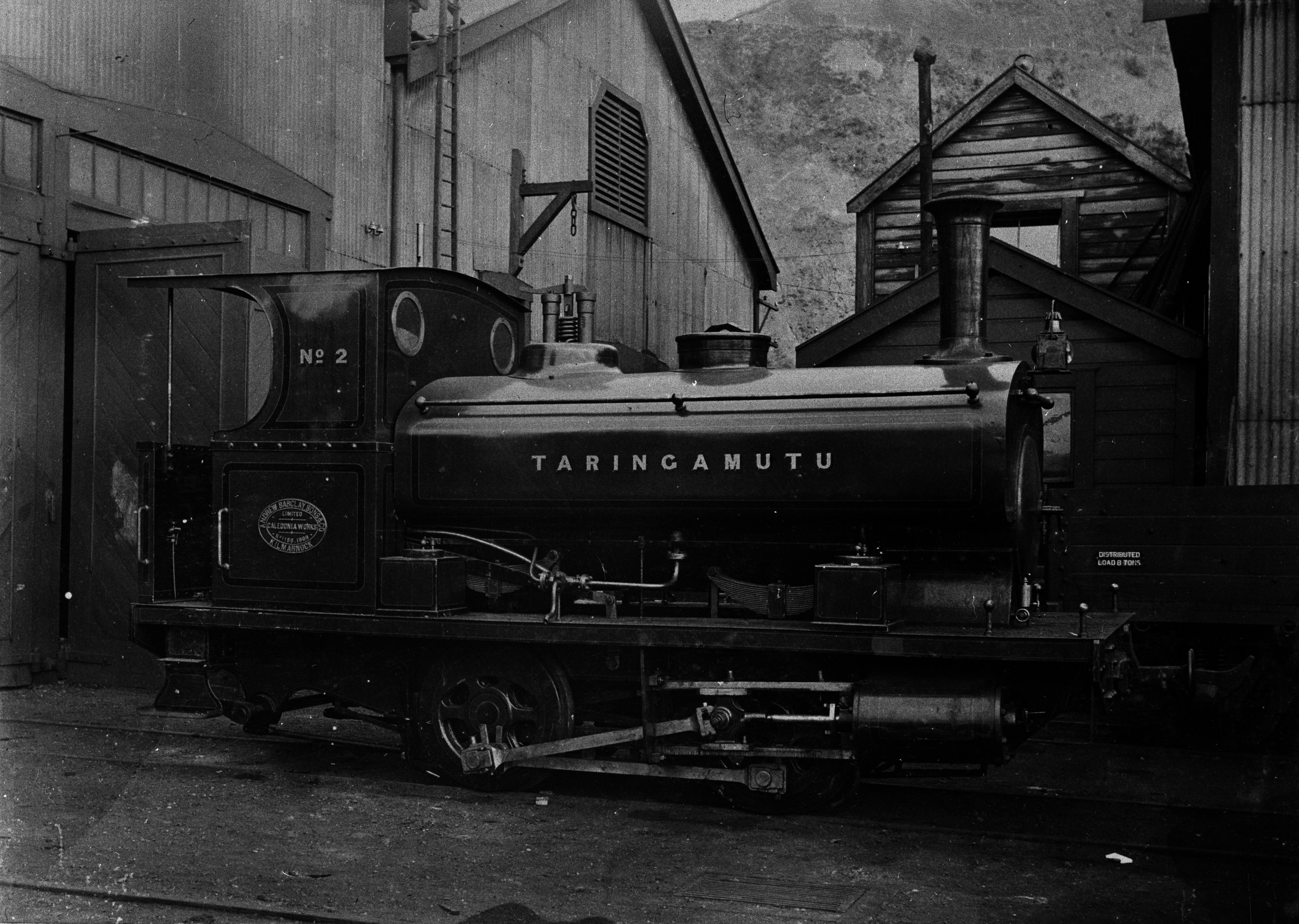
- The Taringamotu Express at Oruaiwi, 1922 Barclay steam locomotive for the Taringa- mutu (sic) Totara Sawmill Company, 1910

Technical
- Track gauge: 3 1/2 feet (1,067 mm)

Taringamotu Tramway, nicknamed Taringamotu Express, was a bush tramway near Oruaiwi, also known as Waituhi, a settlement in the valley of Taringamotu in the Manawatū-Whanganui region of New Zealand's North Island. It operated from 1910 to the mid 1960s.

== History ==
The tramway with a track gauge of 3 1/2 feet (1,067 mm) was used from approximately 1910 to the mid 1960s. Approval for tramway access to Taringamutu station was granted to Taringamutu Sawmilling Co in 1905. The tramway probably began operating in mid 1908, after Taringamutu Totara Sawmills Ltd had been floated in 1907 to raise £60,000 in capital for building two more sawmills and completing the tramway. Taringamotu Totara Sawmills' private siding right began on 1 January 1909. After 1956 it shuttled just between Taringamotu railway station on the North Island Main Trunk and the Taringamotu Totara Sawmill Company, which operated from 1907 to 1956. It was sufficiently well constructed that the NZR would allow their wagons to be used on the tram. For a long time the Railway Enthusiasts Society of Auckland's excursion trains stopped on several occasions at the siding to take a ride on the tram. The former route can still be determined up to the mill, but not beyond.

== Bridges ==
Most of the trestle bridges were surveyed and built by Frank Ward (born in 1873 in Manchester; died 2 June 1956). Although he was of a small stature and seemed a bit frail, his strength in wielding an axe was unusual. He worked mainly on his own, when he built trestle bridges ahead of the bush gangs, who felled the trees and hauled them to the track for being carted with the locomotive of the tramway to the mill. He had to carve the uprights and girders by hand from massive totara logs. The trimming of trestles and squaring of stringers was done using a broadaxe with a much wider blade than that of normal axes.

His masterpiece was 105 feet (32 m) high and 300 feet (91 m) long. It was actually two bridges in one. The lower section of bents was 50 feet (15 m) high and the upper section another 55 feet (17 m). Frank Ward chose the best totara trees for the stringers and broadaxed them down to a uniform thickness of 18 inches (460 mm) from end to end commencing at the butt. He left the sap edges on, so that the a very high strength was achieved by retaining the natural strength of each tree’s grain. He used only a crosscut saw, mauls, axes, wedges, files, marking line and chalk for line marking. The only machine that he used was a hand winch and one of the Vulcan steam haulers, known as Ward’s Hauler which he always operated by himself.

== Accidents ==
At about 4 o'clock in the afternoon of 3 September 1912, a party was being taken through some of the Taringamotu Sawmilling Company's bush on the company's tramway. When near the foot of a steep grade some wild pigs ran across the line, but failed to clear it, and a collision ensuing, a truck containing passengers overturned. A number of travellers were thrown clear. The youth Lade, who died before reaching the hospital, was about 20 years of age. He was a native of Scotsdale, Tasmania, where his parents reside. The Rev. Mr Hanby had his leg broken, a sprained ankle, and was considerably crushed about the chest. Sister Macfarlane, who was on the train at, the time of the mishap, rendered first aid until medical assistance was obtained. The injured persons were brought to Frankton on the Main Trunk express train. Lade died on the train at 1.12 a.m.

Another fatal accident occurred on 22 January 1915 on the Taringamotu Timber Company's line. A train composed of an open truck and a covered passenger car ran in the morning from Taringamotu to Waituhi. According to a contemporary newspaper article, a number of Māori travelled in the open truck, the pākehā travelling in the covered car. Apparently the train ran off the line, as the trucks overturned, killing a Māori child, badly injuring another, breaking the legs of two Māori women and the arm of another. Fortunately, the covered van saved the pākehā who escaped injury.

== Locomotives ==
The Taringamotu Totara Sawmill Company owned in total four steam locomotives and several draisines (locally known as jiggers). In 1908, they bought a second hand Barclay 0-4-0 saddle tank steam locomotive manufactured in 1878. It operated at a steam pressure of 180 pounds per square inch (12 bar) and had 10 1/4 inches (260 mm) diameter cylinders, which were subsequently bored out to 10 1/2 inches (270 mm). In 1912, they replaced the boiler with a bespoke new boiler made by A & G Price, which was in service until the locomotive was taken out of use in 1951.

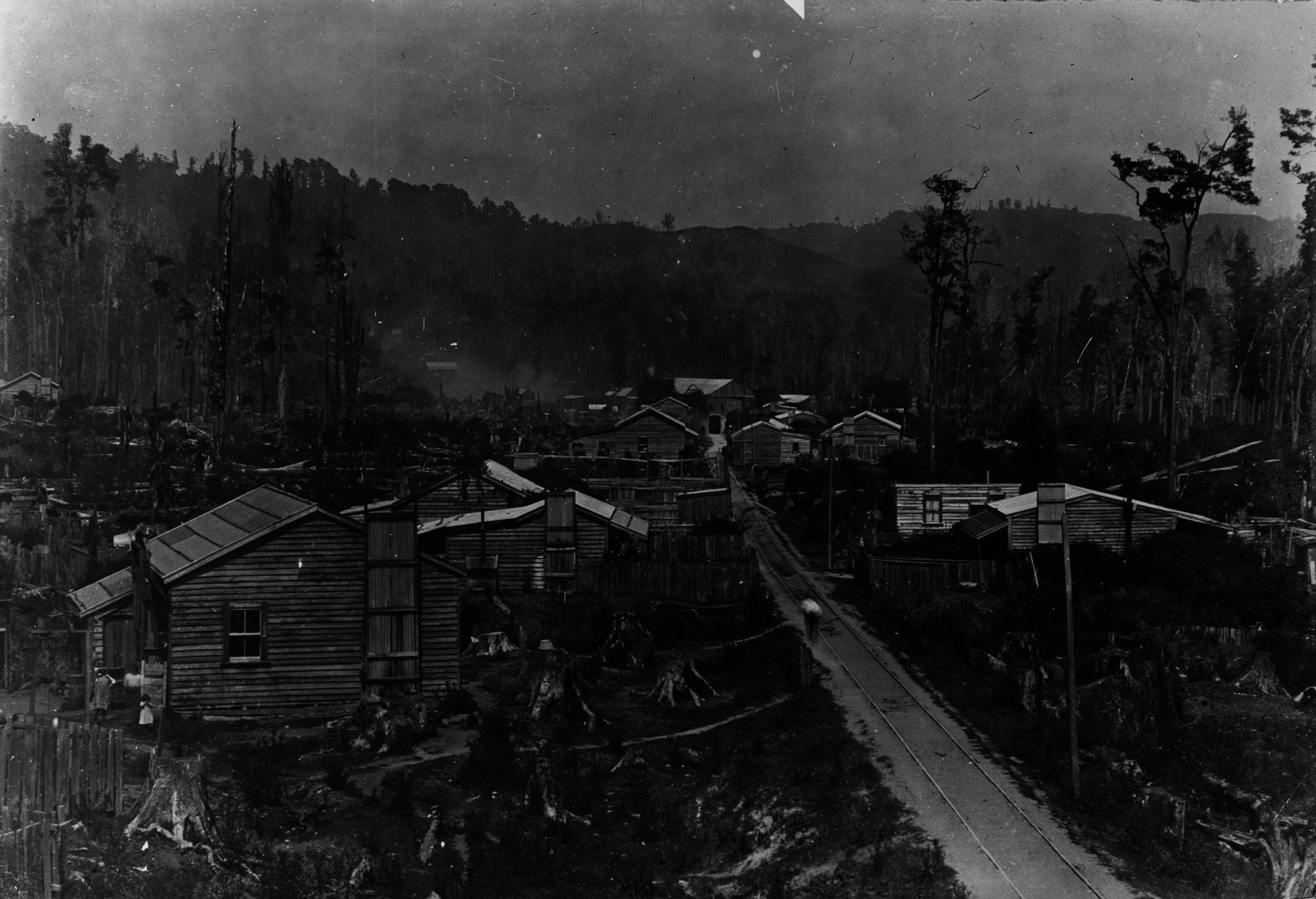
Oruaiwi, also known as Waituhi, a settlement in the valley of the Taringamotu River

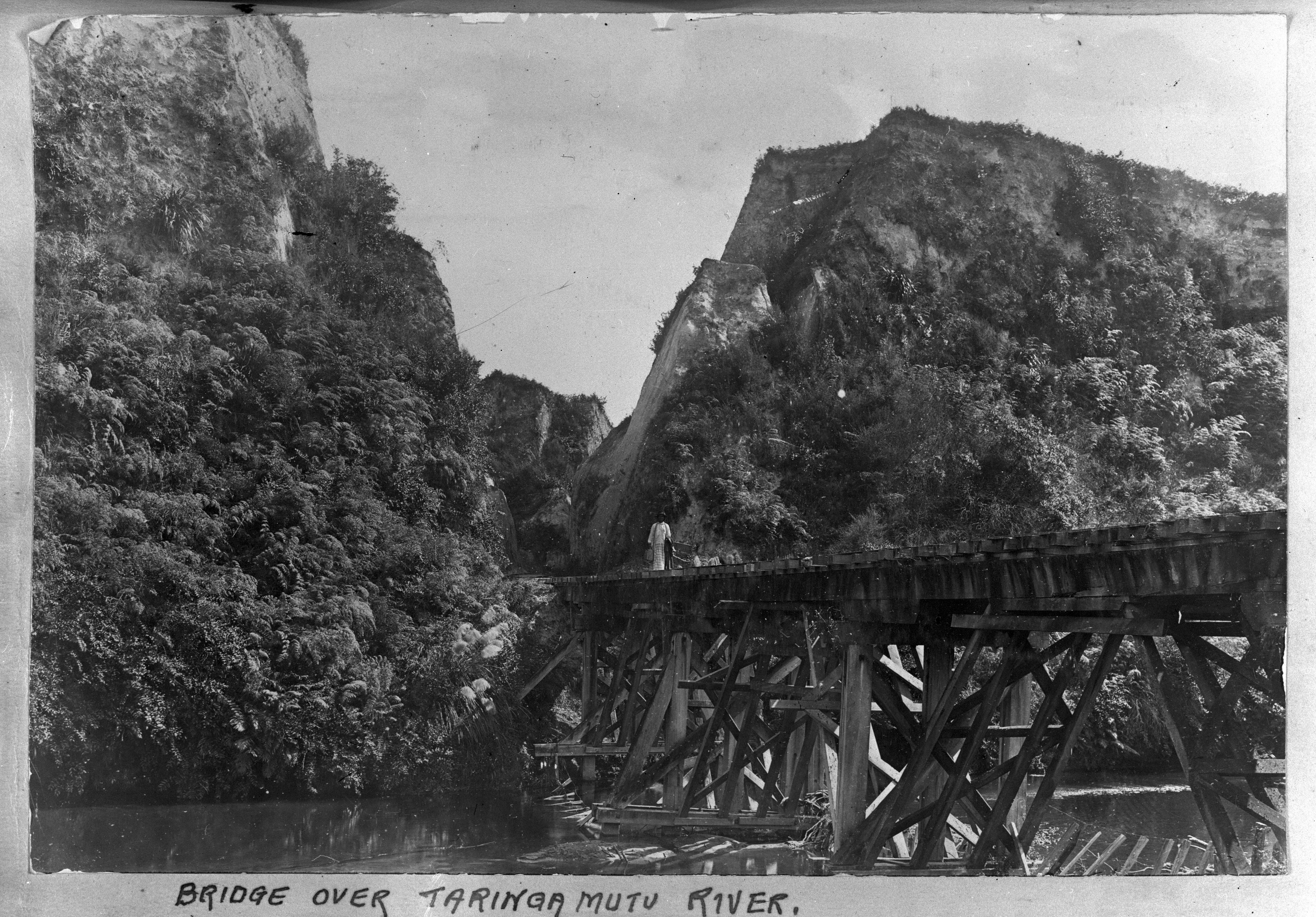
Railway bridge over the Taringamotu River

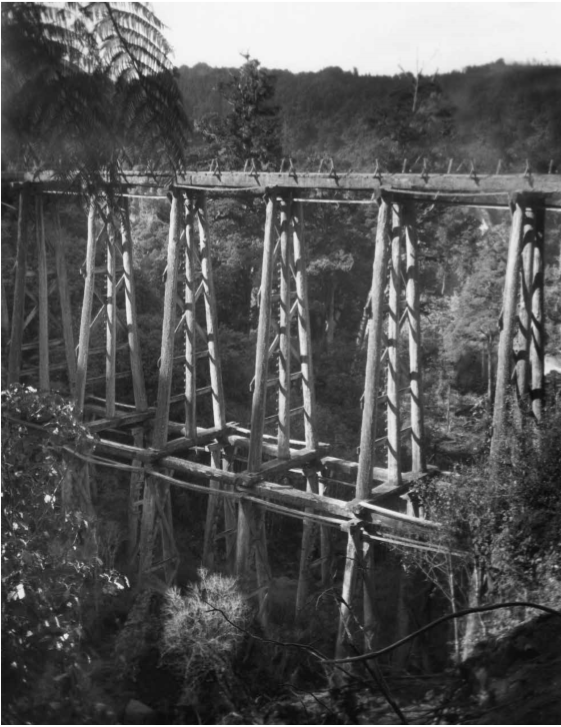
Frank Ward’s double-deck viaduct of the Taringamotu Tramway

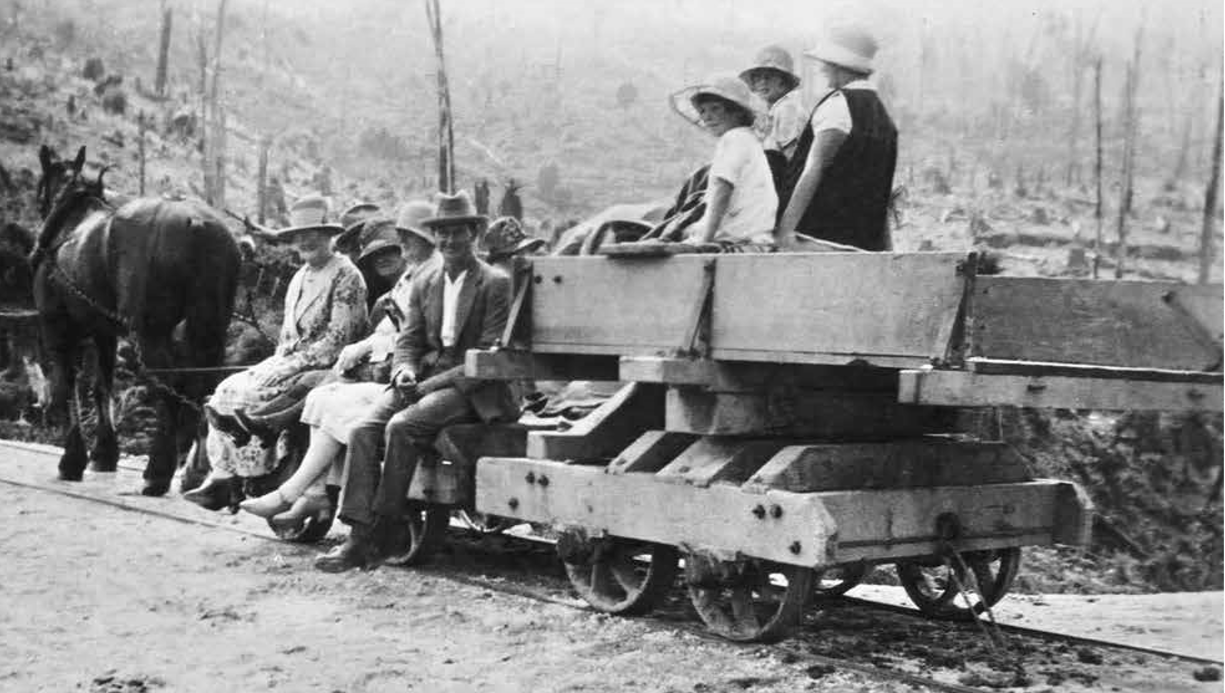
Ride to a picnic at Waituhi on a horse-drawn ballast truck in the late 1920s

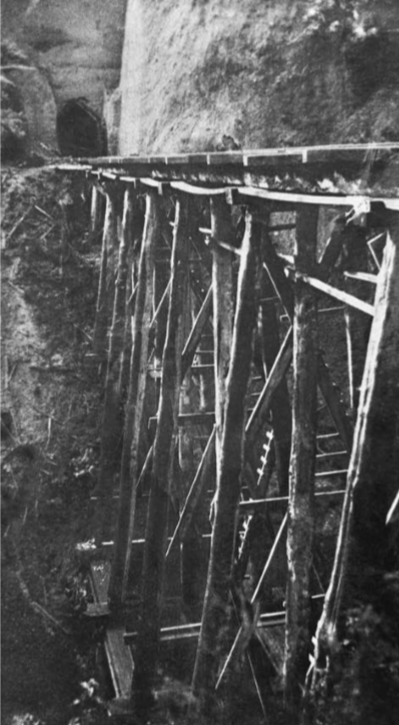
80 feet (24 m) high and 120 feet (37 m) long trestle viaduct leading to the tunnel built in 1922
