= Ongarue railway station =

Defunct railway station in New Zealand

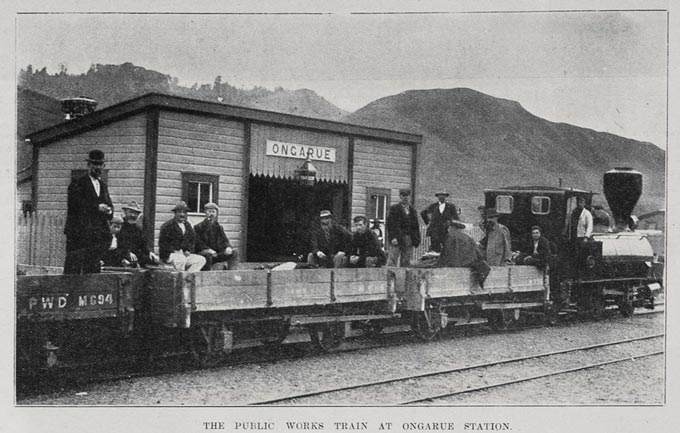
- Ongarue railway station November 1902

General information
- Location: New Zealand
- Coordinates: 38.715787°S 175.282316°E
- Elevation: 193 m (633 ft)
- Line: North Island Main Trunk
- Distance: Wellington 420.68 km (261.40 mi)

History
- Opened: 24 August 1901
- Closed: Before 12/1975
- Electrified: June 1988

Passengers
- 1944: 27,378

Services
| Preceding station | Historical railways | Following station |
|---|---|---|
| Waione Siding; Line open, station closed 4 mi 35 ch (7.1 km) towards Auckland | North Island Main Trunk; KiwiRail | Te Koura; Line open, station closed 7.74 km (4.81 mi) towards Wellington |
Location

Ongarue railway station was a station on the North Island Main Trunk in New Zealand, serving the sawmill town of Ongarue.

In 1900 the station was known as Kawakawa and then Ongaruhe.

From 1922 to 1958 most of the timber freight at the station came from the connected Ellis and Burnand Tramway.

It was the scene of the Ongarue railway disaster in 1923, up to then, the worst rail crash in the country. A memorial was unveiled at the site a century later, on 8 July 2023.

In 1941 the station employed a stationmaster and two clerks.

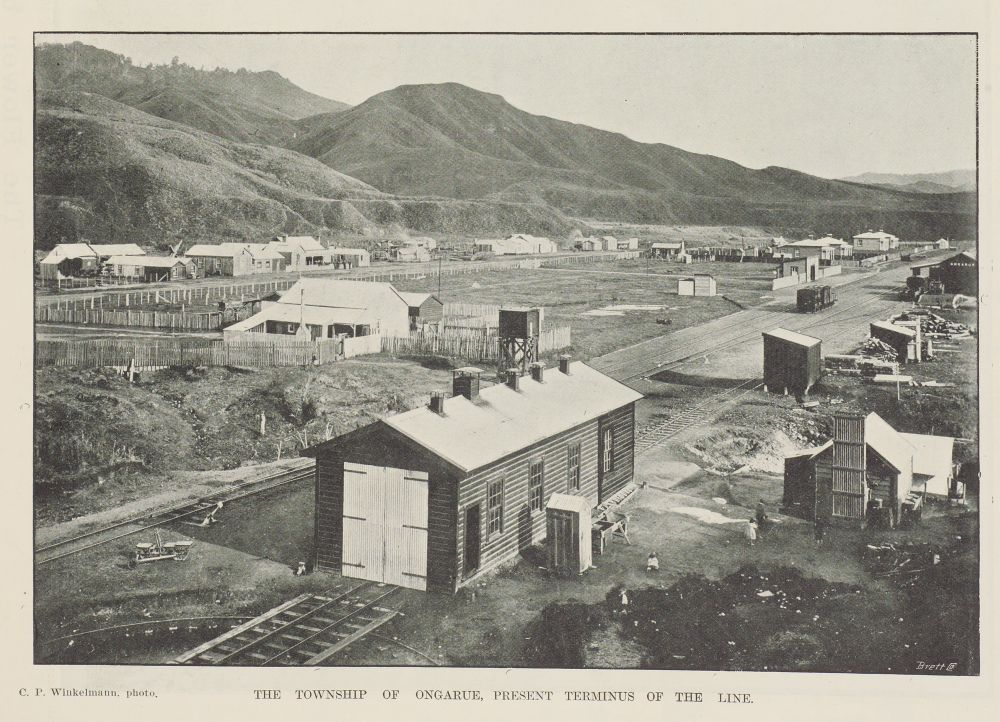
Ongarue 1902

== Patronage ==
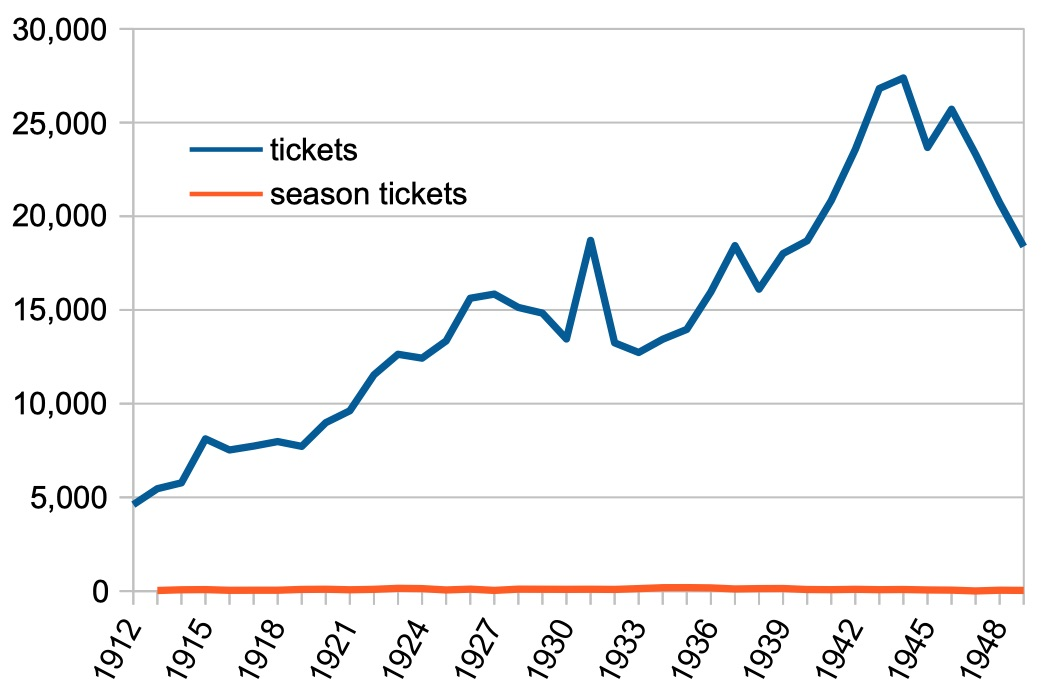
Passenger numbers at Ongarue railway station, based on Statements of Revenue and Expenditure of each Station for the Years ending 31 March

Passenger numbers peaked in 1944, as shown in the graph and table below -

| year | tickets | season tickets | staff | source |
|---|---|---|---|---|
| 1912 | 4,613 | | 4 | "RETURN No. 12. STATEMENT of Revenue and Expenditure of each Station for the Year ended 31st March, 1912" |
| 1913 | 5,464 | 32 | 4 | "RETURN No. 12. STATEMENT of Revenue and Expenditure of each Station for the Year ended 31st March, 1913" |
| 1914 | 5,776 | 71 | | "RETURN No. 12. Statement of Revenue for each Station for the Year ended 31st March, 1914" |
| 1915 | 8,119 | 81 | | "RETURN No. 12. Statement of Revenue for each Station for the Year ended 31st March, 1915" |
| 1916 | 7,528 | 39 | | "RETURN No. 12. Statement of Revenue for each Station for the Year ended 31st March, 1916" |
| 1917 | 7,737 | 48 | | "RETURN No. 12. Statement of Revenue for each Station for the Year ended 31st March, 1917" |
| 1918 | 7,976 | 46 | | "RETURN No. 12. Statement of Revenue for each Station for the Year ended 31st March, 1918" |
| 1919 | 7,721 | 88 | | "RETURN No. 12. Statement of Revenue for each Station for the Year ended 31st March, 1919" |
| 1920 | 8,986 | 100 | | "RETURN No. 12. Statement of Revenue for each Station for the Year ended 31st March, 1920" |
| 1921 | 9,622 | 69 | | "RETURN No. 12. Statement of Revenue for each Station for the Year ended 31st March, 1921" |
| 1922 | 11,541 | 96 | | "RETURN No. 12. Statement of Revenue for each Station for the Year ended 31st March, 1922" |
| 1923 | 12,633 | 149 | | "RETURN No. 12. Statement of Revenue for each Station for the Year ended 31st March, 1923" |
| 1924 | 12,430 | 132 | | "RETURN No. 12. Statement of Revenue for each Station for the Year ended 31st March, 1924" |
| 1925 | 13,347 | 62 | | "RETURN No. 12. Statement of Traffic and Revenue for each Station for the Year ended 31st March, 1925" |
| 1926 | 15,624 | 105 | | "STATEMENT No. 18 Statement of Traffic and Revenue for each Station for the Year ended 31st March, 1926" |
| 1927 | 15,844 | 36 | | "STATEMENT No. 18 Statement of Traffic and Revenue for each Station for the Year ended 31st March, 1927" |
| 1928 | 15,134 | 102 | | "STATEMENT No. 18 Statement of Traffic and Revenue for each Station for the Year ended 31st March, 1928" |
| 1929 | 14,834 | 99 | | "STATEMENT No. 18 Statement of Traffic and Revenue for each Station for the Year ended 31st March, 1929" |
| 1930 | 13,453 | 93 | | "STATEMENT No. 18 Statement of Traffic and Revenue for each Station for the Year ended 31st March, 1930" |
| 1931 | 18,709 | 100 | | "STATEMENT No. 18 Statement of Traffic and Revenue for each Station for the Year ended 31st March, 1931" |
| 1932 | 13,245 | 88 | | "STATEMENT No. 18 Statement of Traffic and Revenue for each Station for the Year ended 31st March, 1932" |
| 1933 | 12,732 | 130 | | "STATEMENT No. 18 Statement of Traffic and Revenue for each Station for the Year ended 31st March, 1933" |
| 1934 | 13,440 | 179 | | "STATEMENT No. 18 Statement of Traffic and Revenue for each Station for the Year ended 31st March, 1934" |
| 1935 | 13,963 | 187 | | "STATEMENT No. 18 Statement of Traffic and Revenue for each Station for the Year ended 31st March, 1935" |
| 1936 | 15,966 | 173 | | "STATEMENT No. 18 Statement of Traffic and Revenue for each Station for the Year ended 31st March, 1936" |
| 1937 | 18,434 | 114 | | "STATEMENT No. 18 Statement of Traffic and Revenue for each Station for the Year ended 31st March, 1937" |
| 1938 | 16,108 | 133 | | "STATEMENT No. 18 Statement of Traffic and Revenue for each Station for the Year ended 31st March, 1938" |
| 1939 | 18,009 | 136 | | "STATEMENT No. 18 Statement of Traffic and Revenue for each Station for the Year ended 31st March, 1939" |
| 1940 | 18,690 | 85 | | "STATEMENT No. 18 Statement of Traffic and Revenue for each Station for the Year ended 31st March, 1940" |
| 1941 | 20,837 | 73 | | "STATEMENT No. 18 Statement of Traffic and Revenue for each Station for the Year ended 31st March, 1941" |
| 1942 | 23,559 | 92 | | "STATEMENT No. 18 Statement of Traffic and Revenue for each Station for the Year ended 31st March, 1942" |
| 1943 | 26,817 | 75 | | "STATEMENT No. 18 Statement of Traffic and Revenue for each Station for the Year ended 31st March, 1943" |
| 1944 | 27,378 | 82 | | "STATEMENT No. 18 Statement of Traffic and Revenue for each Station for the Year ended 31st March, 1944" |
| 1945 | 23,674 | 60 | | "STATEMENT No. 18 Statement of Traffic and Revenue for each Station for the Year ended 31st March, 1945" |
| 1946 | 25,709 | 50 | | "STATEMENT No. 18 Statement of Traffic and Revenue for each Station for the Year ended 31st March, 1946" |
| 1947 | 23,309 | 6 | | "STATEMENT No. 18 Statement of Traffic and Revenue for each Station for the Year ended 31st March, 1947" |
| 1948 | 20,718 | 44 | | "STATEMENT No. 18 Statement of Traffic and Revenue for each Station for the Year ended 31st March, 1948" |
| 1949 | 18,384 | 34 | | "STATEMENT No. 18 Statement of Traffic and Revenue for each Station for the Year ended 31st March, 1949" |
