= Ongarue River =

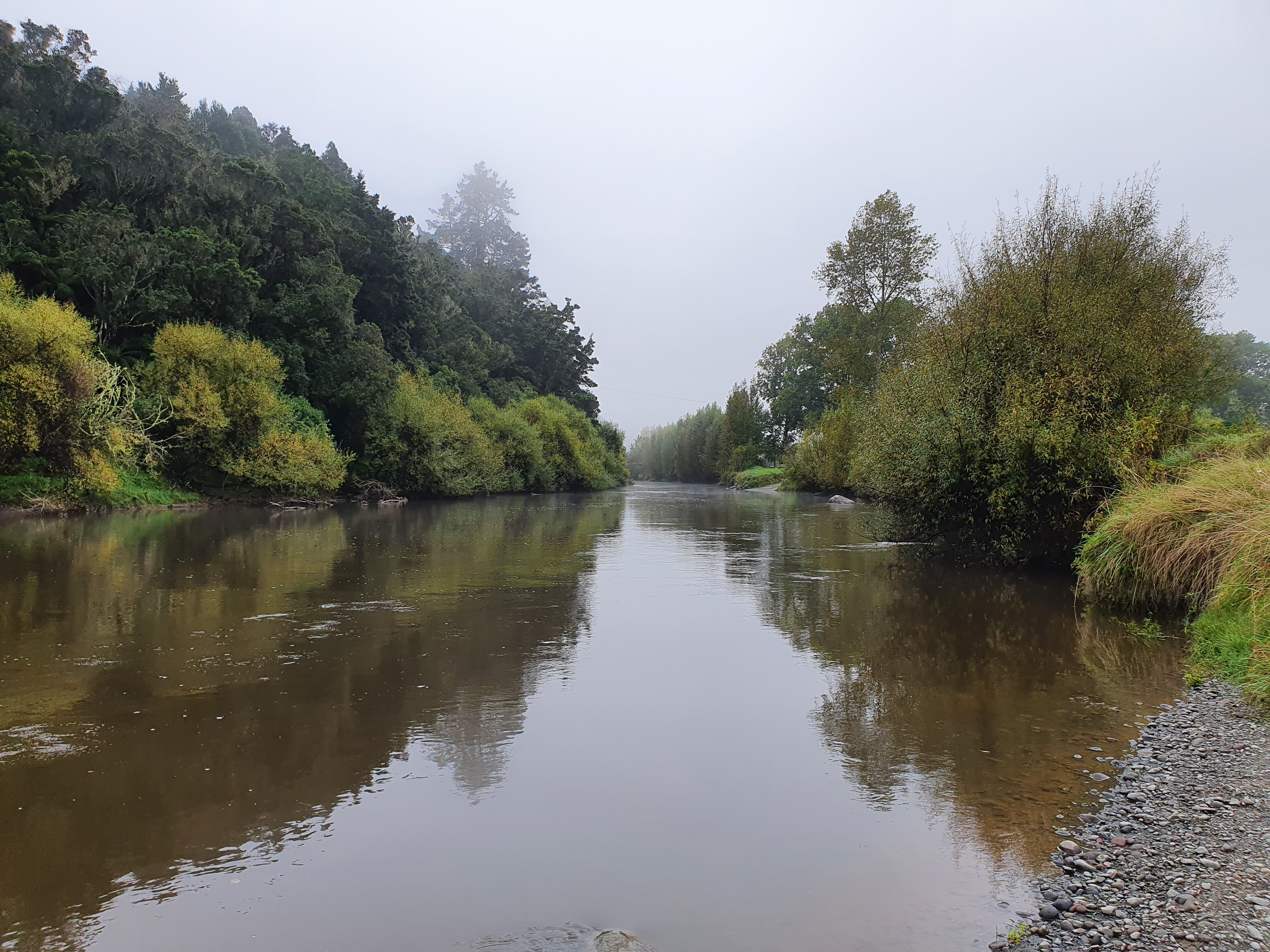
- The Ongarue River near the mouth at Taumarunui
- Etymology: Māori meaning "place of shaking"
- Native name: Ōngarue (Māori)

Location
- Country: New Zealand
- Region: Manawatū-Whanganui
- Towns: Taumarunui
- Settlements: Ongarue, Waimiha

Physical characteristics
- Source: Hauhungaroa Range
  - location: Pureora
  - coordinates: 38°33′14″S 175°37′48″E
  - elevation: 1,100 m (3,600 ft)
- Mouth: Whanganui River
  - location: Taumarunui
  - coordinates: 38°53′31″S 175°15′11″E
  - elevation: 144 m (472 ft)
- Length: 73 km (45 mi)

Basin features
- Progression: Ongarue River → Whanganui River
- River system: Whanganui River
- Tributaries
  - left: Maramataha River, Taringamotu River
- Waterfalls: Wilton Falls, Kawauariki Falls

The Ongarue River is a river of the Manawatū-Whanganui region of New Zealand's North Island. A major tributary of the Whanganui River, it flows west then south from its sources on Pureora and north of the Hauhungaroa Range, northwest of Lake Taupō, before reaching the Whanganui River at the town of Taumarunui. The valley is followed by State Highway 4, from near Ongarue, and by the North Island Main Trunk railway for about 30 km (19 mi), from near Waimiha.

Tributaries of the Ongarue include the Maramataha and Taringamotu Rivers and the Mangakahu Stream.

The maximum flow in the river is about 570 cubic metres per second (1,200,000 cu ft/min).

Kayaks can navigate up to Waimiha, except in a narrow gorge near Paraketu and shallow rapids below Taringamotu.

== See also ==
- List of rivers of New Zealand
