= C. P. (name) =

People known by the initials C. P. include:

- C. P. Chitrarasu (1908–1978), Indian politician and writer
- C. P. Connolly (1863–1935), American investigative journalist
- C. P. Couch (1890–1955), president of Kansas City Southern Railway
- C. P. Gurnani (born 1958), CEO of Tech Mahindra
- C. P. Johnstone (1895–1974), English born cricketer who played mainly in India
- C. P. Joshi (born 1950), Indian politician
- C. P. Lounsbury (1872–1955), American-born South African entomologist
- C. P. Lyons (1915–1998), Canadian outdoorsman and natural historian
- C. P. Mohammed (born 1952), Indian politician
- C. P. Newton (1879–1958), American politician
- C. P. Radhakrishnan (born 1957), Indian politician
- C. P. Rajendran (born 1955), Indian geologist
- C. P. Ramachandran (1923–1997), Indian journalist and political activist
- C. P. Rele (1920s–2010), Hindustani classical musician
- C. P. Sadashivaiah (1931–2007), Indian freedom fighter, industrialist, philanthropist and inventor
- C. P. Sinha, Indian politician
- C. P. Snow (1905–1980), English physical chemist and novelist
- C. P. Spencer (1938–2004), American musician, singer, songwriter and record producer
- C. P. Thakur (born 1931), Indian politician
- C. P. Trussell (1892–1968), American journalist
- C P Udayabhanu (born 1959), Indian public prosecutor
- C. P. Wang (born 1947), Taiwanese architect
- C. P. Yogeshwar (born 1962), Indian politician
