= CPP =

CPP and cpp may refer to:

== Economics and finance ==
- Canada Pension Plan, a contributory, earnings-related social insurance program in Canada
- Capital Purchase Program, a preferred stock and equity warrant purchase program in the US
- Consistent pricing process, any representation of "prices" of assets in a market
- Cost per point, the cost of an advertising campaign, relative to the rating points delivered

=== Companies ===
- Cleveland Public Power, an electricity generation and distribution company in Ohio, US
- CPP Group, a British company selling life assistance products
- CPP Investments, Canadian pension fund
- Canon Production Printing, subsidiary of Canon Inc., formerly known as Océ

== Organizations ==
=== Political parties ===
- Cambodian People's Party, a political party of Cambodia
- Chin Progressive Party, a political party in Myanmar
- Collaborating Political Parties, a political alliance in Liberia
- Communist Party of Pakistan, a political party in Pakistan
- Communist Party of the Philippines, a political party in the Philippines
- Convention People's Party, a socialist political party in Ghana
- Pan-African Patriotic Convergence (French: Convergence patriotique panafricaine), a political party in Togo

== Professional certifications ==
- Certified Payroll Professional, a professional certification conferred by the American Payroll Association
- Certified Pharmacist Practitioner, a certification on licenses of pharmacists in the state of Montana
- Certified Professional Photographer, degree or certification given by the Professional Photographers of America and used after your signature as initials, CPP
- Certified Protection Professional, a security management designation conferred by ASIS International

== Science and technology ==
- C preprocessor, a program that processes the C programming language before it is compiled
- C++ (file extension: .cpp), a programming language
- Carte parallelogrammatique projection, an equirectangular map projection
- Chinese postman problem, a mathematical problem in graph theory
- meta-Chlorophenylpiperazine, a chemical
- Controllable-pitch propeller, is a type of propeller used in Marine propulsion. It may also refer to a controllable-pitch propeller used in aeronautics.
- Cycloparaphenylene
- Cast Polypropylene, a type of wrapping plastic with good thermic properties.

=== Medicine ===
- Cell-penetrating peptide, are short polycationic sequences
- Central precocious puberty, a condition in which puberty begins abnormally early
- Cerebral perfusion pressure, regarding blood flow to the brain
- Coronary perfusion pressure, regarding blood flow to the heart muscle
- Certificate of pharmaceutical product, a certificate which establishes the status of a pharmaceutical product
- Chronic pelvic pain, a medical condition
- Critical process parameters, key variables affecting the production process
- Chronic pain patients, a medical group with multiple painful conditions

== Other uses ==
- California State Polytechnic University, Pomona (Cal Poly Pomona), a four-year university in California, US
- Canadian Public Policy, a quarterly peer-reviewed academic journal
- Common practice period, a Western classical music history period (c. 1650–1900)
- Coal preparation plant, a processing facility for washing raw coal
- Code de procédure pénale, the French Code of criminal procedure
- Codex Parisino-petropolitanus, an early manuscript of the Qurʾān
- Concrete Pavement Preservation
- Conditioned place preference, a form of Pavlovian conditioning
- Celebrity Paranormal Project, an American reality TV show which aired in 2006
- Counter promenade position, a dance position
- Clean Power Plan, US policy attempting to curb emissions from electricity generation
- Child-Parent Psychotherapy, a dyadic psychotherapy for children and parents who have experienced trauma, especially through domestic-violence

== See also ==
- CP (disambiguation)
- CP2 (disambiguation)
- CCP (disambiguation)
