= CPPS =

CPPS may refer to:

- Chronic pelvic pain syndrome, a pelvic pain condition affecting men
- Comstock Park Public Schools, a school district in Michigan, US
- C.PP.S., the post-nominal initials of the Missionaries of the Precious Blood
- Club Penguin private server, unofficial instances of the video game Club Penguin
- Castle Peak Power Station, currently the largest coal-fired power station in Hong Kong.
- Canadian Pacific Police Service
- Cyber-physical production system, a variant of a cyber-physical system (CPS)

== See also ==
- CPP (disambiguation)
