= Waiteti railway station =

Railway station in New Zealand

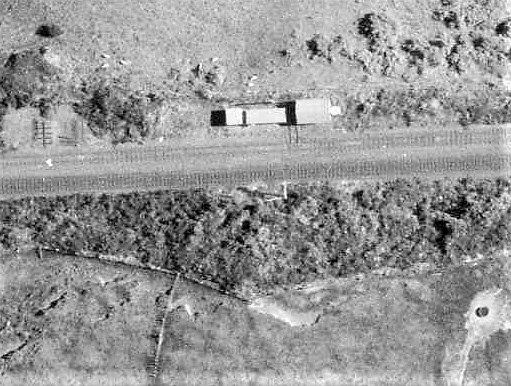
- 1980 aerial view of Waiteti railway station

General information
- Location: New Zealand
- Coordinates: 38.386906°S 175.199007°E
- Elevation: 125 m (410 ft)
- Line: North Island Main Trunk
- Distance: Wellington 470.07 km (292.09 mi)

History
- Opened: 1939
- Closed: 1987
- Electrified: June 1988

Services
Preceding station	Historical railways	Following station
Te Kuiti; Line open, station closed 5.59 km (3.47 mi)	North Island Main Trunk; KiwiRail	Puketutu; Line open, station closed 8.24 km (5.12 mi)
Location

Waiteti (sometimes named Waititi) was a passing loop on the North Island Main Trunk railway (NIMT) in New Zealand, built in 1939 to relieve congestion along a single track block, where the line rises steeply from Te Kuiti on a 1 in 70 gradient for 7 mi (11 km), including curves of 8 ch (160 m) to 20 ch (400 m) radius. It was 470.07 km (292.09 mi) from Wellington. From its opening it was under central control from Te Kuiti signalbox. The loop could hold 100 4-wheeled wagons.

Sources vary as to opening and closing dates. On 5 October 1938 a new crossing loop was estimated to cost £8,600. The work was done at the same time the loop at Kopaki was extended, the total cost for both being £19,000. The loop probably opened on 9 December 1939, or possibly 3 December 1939 and closed on 31 March 1987, or, alternatively, as gazetted, January 1939 to 5 May 1977. The station was clearly visible on a 1983 aerial photo. Electrification came in 1988, which allowed for more powerful locomotives, reducing the need for the passing point on the long gradient.

The loop was on the section of line from Te Kuiti to Puketutu, for which the Public Works Department had signed a contract on 9 March 1887 and which opened just over 2 years later.

Waiteti translates to water dripping from the ground. The station was in the valley of the Waiteti Stream.

== See also ==
Waiteti Viaduct
