= CPCP =

CPCP may refer to:

- Soviet Union (Ukrainian: Союз Радянських Соціалістичних Республік (СРСР), romanized: Sojuz Radyanskykh Socialistychnykh Respublik (SRSR))
- College Point Corporate Park, an industrial park in College Point, Queens, New York City
- Carnivore and Pangolin Conservation Program, at Cúc Phương National Park
- Council of Presbyterian Churches in the Philippines, of the Presbyterian Church of the Philippines

== See also ==
- CP (disambiguation)
- CP2 (disambiguation)
