= Igga =

IGGA can refer to:

- IGA (supermarkets)
- International Grooving & Grinding Association (IGGA)
- James Wani Igga - Vice President of South Sudan
