= Ultradivided matter =

In physics, ultradivided matter is a family of states of matter characterised by a heterogeneous mixture of two or more different materials, where the interaction energy between the suspended phase is larger than kT. The term 'ultradivided matter' encapsulates several types of substance including: soap micelles, emulsions, and suspensions of solids such as colloids.).

An ultradivided state differs from a solution. In a steady-state solution, all interactions between a solution's constituent molecules are on the order of the thermal energy kT. Thus any otherwise aggregative force between similar molecules in a solution is subordinate to thermal fluctuations, and the solution does allow flocculation of one of the constituent components. Ultradivided matter, however, is characterised by large interfacial energies where the intermolecular interactions of one or more constituents of the substance are stronger than kT. This leads to different behaviour. An intuitive example of this can be seen in the tendency of a biphasic mixture of water (a polar liquid) and oil (a non-polar liquid) to spontaneously separate into two phases. This may seem to imply a change from a state with higher disorder or higher entropy (a suspension of oil droplets in water) to a lower-entropy arrangement (a neat separation into two regions of different material). Such a transition would seem to violate the second law of thermodynamics, which is impossible. The resolution to this apparent paradox is that the interface between oil and water necessitates an ordered alignment of oil and water molecules at the interface. Minimisation of the surface area between the two phases thus correlates with an increase of the entropy of the system. The highest entropy state thus has a minimum interfacial surface area between the two phases and thus a neat separation is created, into two regions of different material.

== See also ==
- Colloid
