= BSSE =

BSSE may refer to:

- Bratislava Stock Exchange
- Basis set superposition error
- Bachelor of Science in Software Engineering, more commonly called a Bachelor of Software Engineering
- Bally Sports Southeast, American regional sports network owned and operated by Bally Sports
