= Centralized traffic control =

Railway signalling system

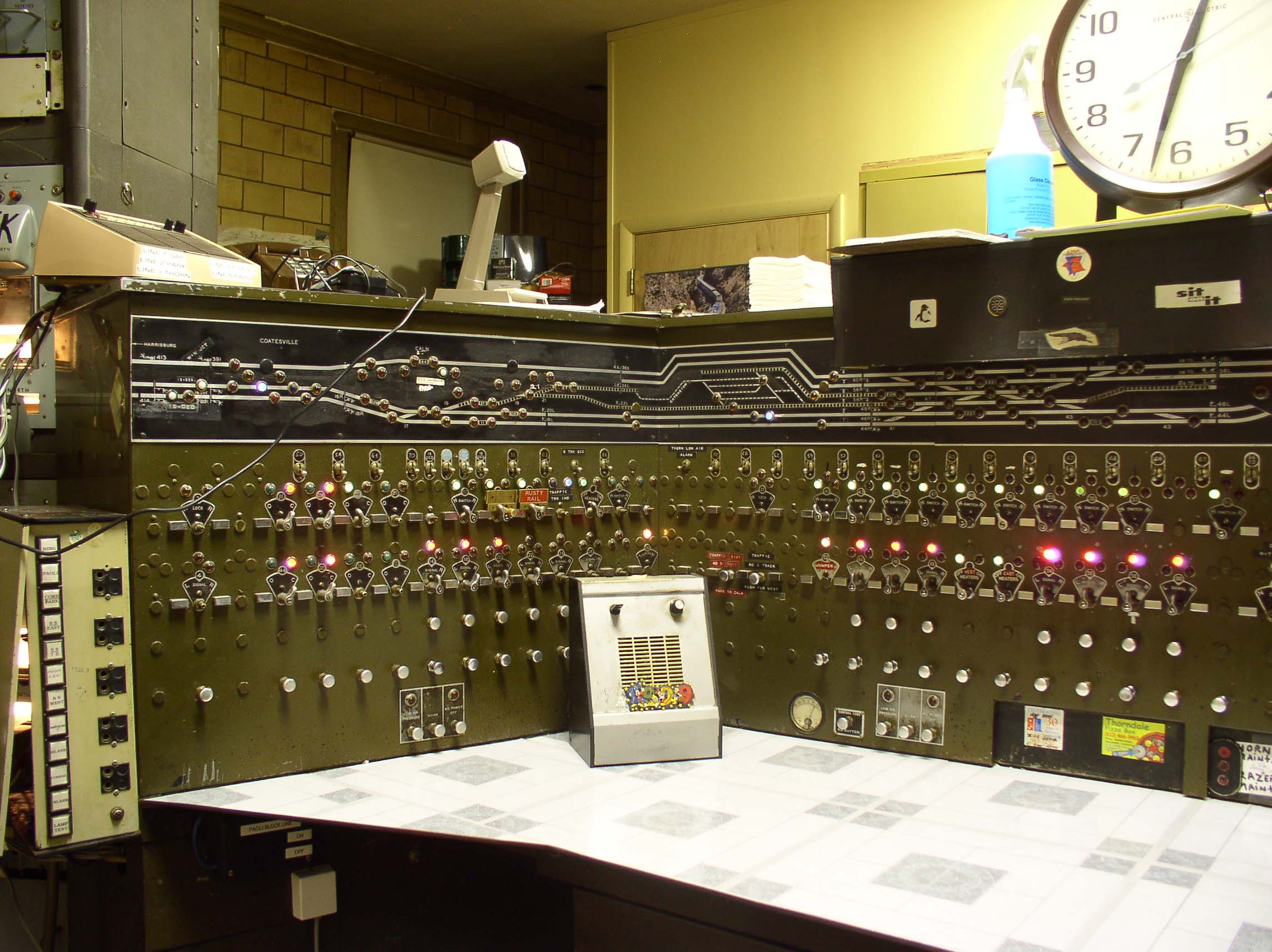
Active Union Switch and Signal Co relay based CTC machine at THORN tower in Thorndale, Pennsylvania (2007)

Centralized traffic control (CTC) is a form of railway signalling that originated in North America. CTC consolidates train routing decisions that were previously carried out by local signal operators or the train crews themselves. The system consists of a centralized train dispatcher's office that controls railroad interlockings and traffic flows in portions of the rail system designated as CTC territory. One hallmark of CTC is a control panel with a graphical depiction of the railroad. On this panel, the dispatcher can keep track of trains' locations across the territory that the dispatcher controls. Larger railroads may have multiple dispatcher's offices and even multiple dispatchers for each operating division. These offices are usually located near the busiest yards or stations, and their operational qualities can be compared to air traffic towers.

== Background ==
Key to the concept of CTC is the notion of traffic control as it applies to North American railroads. Trains moving in opposite directions on the same track cannot pass each other without special infrastructure such as sidings and switches that allow one of the trains to move out of the way. Initially, the only two ways for trains to arrange such interactions was to somehow arrange it in advance or provide a communications link between the authority for train movements (the dispatcher) and the trains themselves. These two mechanisms for control would be formalized by American railroad companies in a set of procedures called train order operation, which was later partly automated through use of Automatic Block Signals (ABS).

The starting point of each system was the railroad timetable that would form the advanced routing plan for train movements. Trains following the timetable would know when to take sidings, switch tracks and which route to take at junctions. However, if train movements did not go as planned, the timetable would then fail to represent reality, and attempting to follow the printed schedule could lead to routing errors or even accidents. This was especially common on single-track lines that comprised the majority of railroad route miles in North America. Pre-defined "meets" could lead to large delays if either train failed to show up, or worse, an "extra" train not listed in the timetable could suffer a head-on collision with another train that did not expect it.

Therefore, timetable operation was supplemented with train orders, which superseded the instructions in the timetable. From the 1850s until the middle of the twentieth century, train orders were telegraphed in Morse code by a dispatcher to a local station, where the orders would be written down on standardized forms and a copy provided to the train crew when they passed that station, directing them to take certain actions at various points ahead: for example, take a siding to meet another train, wait at a specified location for further instructions, run later than scheduled, or numerous other actions. The development of Direct Traffic Control via radio or telephone between dispatchers and train crews made telegraph orders largely obsolete by the 1970s.

Where traffic density warranted it, multiple tracks could be provided, each with a timetable-defined flow of traffic which would eliminate the need for frequent single track-style "meets." Trains running counter to this flow of traffic would still require train orders, but other trains would not. This system was further automated by the use of Automatic Block Signaling and interlocking towers which allowed for efficient and failsafe setting of conflicting routes at junctions and that kept trains following one another safely separated. However, any track that supported trains running bi-directionally, even under ABS protection, would require further protection to avoid the situation of two trains approaching each other on the same section of track. Such a scenario not only represents a safety hazard, but also would require one train to reverse direction to the nearest passing point.

Before the advent of CTC there were a number of solutions to this problem that did not require the construction of multiple single direction tracks. Many western railroads used an automatic system called absolute permissive block (APB), where trains entering a stretch of single track would cause all of the opposing signals between there and the next passing point to "tumble down" to a Stop position thus preventing opposing trains from entering. In areas of higher traffic density, sometimes bi-directional operation would be established between staffed interlocking towers. Each section of bi-directional track would have a traffic control lever associated with it to establish the direction of traffic on that track. Often, both towers would need to set their traffic levers in the same way before a direction of travel could be established. Block signals in the direction of travel would display according to track conditions and signals against the flow of traffic would always be set to their most restrictive aspect. Furthermore, no train could be routed into a section of track against its flow of traffic and the traffic levers would not be able to be changed until the track section was clear of trains. Both APB and manual traffic control would still require train orders in certain situations, and both required trade-offs between human operators and granularity of routing control.

== Development and technology ==
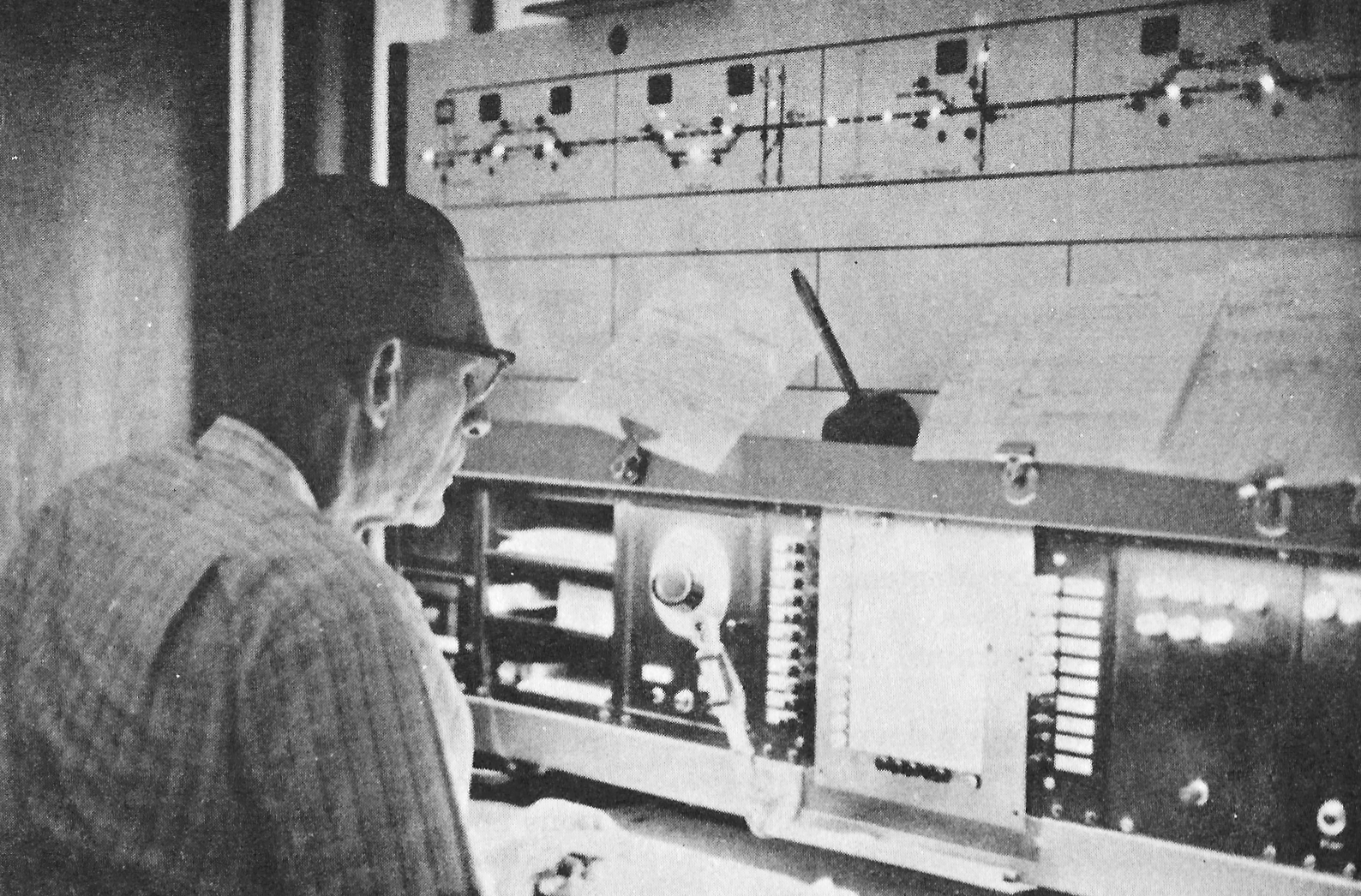
Penn Central Southern Region (Columbus Division) Train Dispatcher controlling train movements at the CTC "B" board in Columbus, Ohio. At this position, one person could handle about 25 through train movements a day. (1970)

The ultimate solution to the costly and imprecise train order system was developed by the General Railway Signal company as their trademarked "Centralized Traffic Control" technology. Its first installation in 1927 was on a 40-mile stretch of the New York Central Railroad between Stanley, Toledo and Berwick, Ohio, with the CTC control machine located at Fostoria, Ohio. CTC was designed to enable the train dispatcher to control train movements directly, bypassing local operators and eliminating written train orders. Instead, the train dispatcher could directly see the trains' locations and efficiently control the train's movements by displaying signals and controlling switches. It was also designed to enhance safety by reporting any track occupancy (see track circuit) to a human operator and automatically preventing trains from entering a track against the established flow of traffic.

What made CTC machines different from standard interlocking machines and ABS was that the vital interlocking hardware was located at the remote location and the CTC machine only displayed track state and sent commands to the remote locations. A command to display a signal would require the remote interlocking to set the flow of traffic and check for a clear route through the interlocking. If a command could not be carried out due to the interlocking logic, the display would not change on the CTC machine. This system provided the same degree flexibility that the manual traffic control has before it, but without the cost and complexity associated with providing an operator at the end of every route segment. This was especially true for lightly used lines that could never hope to justify so much overhead.

Initially the communication was accomplished by dedicated wires or wire pairs, but later this was supplanted by pulse code systems utilizing a single common communications link and relay-based telecommunications technology similar to that used in crossbar switches. Also, instead of only displaying information about trains approaching and passing through interlockings, the CTC machine displayed the status of every block between interlockings, where previously such sections had been considered "dark territory" (i.e., of unknown status) as far as the dispatcher was concerned. The CTC system would allow the flow of traffic to be set over many sections of track by a single person at a single location as well as control of switches and signals at interlockings, which also came to be referred to as control points.

CTC machines started out as small consoles in existing towers only operating a few nearby remote interlockings and then grew to control more and more territory, allowing less trafficked towers to be closed. Over time, the machines were moved directly into dispatcher offices, eliminating the need for dispatchers to first communicate with block operators as middlemen. In the late 20th century, the electromechanical control and display systems were replaced with computer operated displays. While similar signaling control mechanisms have been developed in other countries, what sets CTC apart is the paradigm of independent train movement between fixed points under the control and supervision of a central authority.

=== Signals and controlled points ===
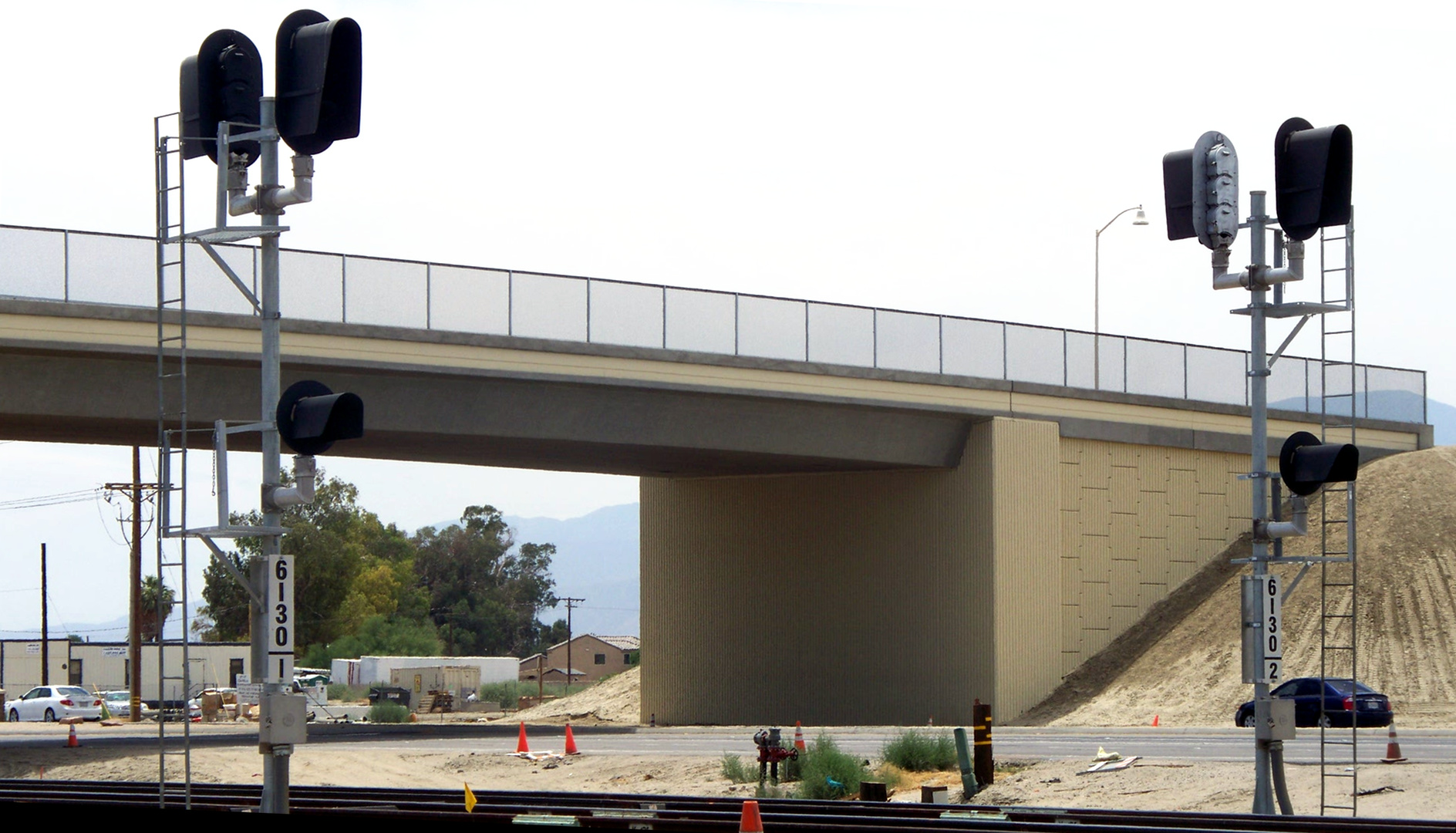
CTC automatic block signals along the Union Pacific Railroad Yuma Subdivision, Coachella, California

CTC makes use of railway signals to convey the dispatcher's instructions to the trains. These take the form of routing decisions at controlled points that authorize a train to proceed or stop. Local signaling logic will ultimately determine the exact signal to display based on track occupancy status ahead and the exact route the train needs to take, so the only input required from the CTC system amounts to the go, no-go instruction.

Signals in CTC territory are one of two types: an absolute signal, which is directly controlled by the train dispatcher and helps design the limits of a control point, or an intermediate signal, which is automatically controlled by the conditions of the track in that signal's block and by the condition of the following signal. Train dispatchers cannot directly control intermediate signals and so are almost always excluded from the dispatcher's control display except as an inert reference.

The majority of control points are equipped with remote control, power-operated switches. These switches often are dual-controlled switches, as they may be either remotely controlled by the train dispatcher or by manually operating a lever or pump on the switch mechanism itself (although the train dispatcher's permission is generally required to do so). These switches may lead to a passing siding, or they may take the form of a crossover, which allows movement to an adjacent track, or a "turnout" which routes a train to an alternate track (or route).

== Operation ==
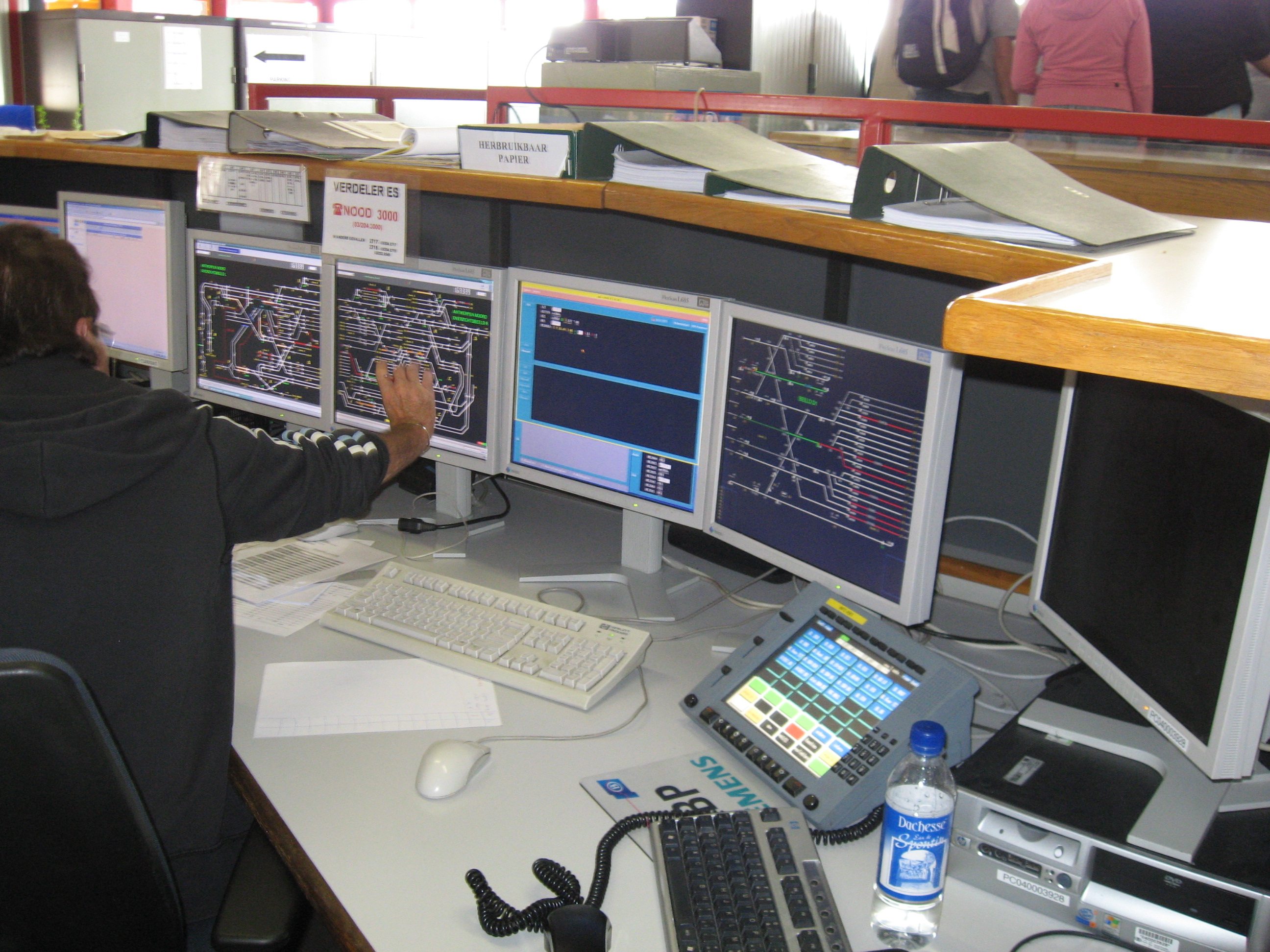
Computer-based controls for a modern electronic interlocking

Although some railroads still rely on older, simpler electronic lighted displays and manual controls, in modern implementations, dispatchers rely on computerized systems similar to supervisory control and data acquisition (SCADA) systems to view the location of trains and the aspect, or display, of absolute signals. Typically, these control machines will prevent the dispatcher from giving two trains conflicting authority without needing to first have the command fail at the remote interlocking. Modern computer systems generally display a highly simplified mock-up of the track, displaying the locations of absolute signals and sidings. Track occupancy is displayed via bold or colored lines overlaying the track display, along with tags to identify the train (usually the number of the lead locomotive). Signals which the dispatcher can control are represented as either at Stop (typically red) or "displayed" (typically green). A displayed signal is one which is not displaying Stop and the exact aspect that the crew sees is not reported to the dispatcher.

== By country ==
=== Australia ===
The first CTC installation in Australia was commissioned in September 1957 on the Glen Waverley line in suburban Melbourne. 6 miles (9.7 km) in length, it was installed by the Victorian Railways as a prototype for the North East standard project.

In June 1959, the Western Australian Government Railways completed installation of Australia's first large-scale application of CTC, on the 3 ft 6 in (1,067 mm) South Western Railway, which links Perth with Bunbury. Upon its completion, that CTC system covered the 39 mi-long (63 km) portion of single-track line between Armadale, on Perth's south eastern outskirts, and Pinjarra, further south.

CTC has since been widely deployed to major interstate railway lines.

=== New Zealand ===
CTC was first installed in New Zealand between Taumarunui and Okahukura on the heavily trafficked North Island Main Trunk in 1938 followed by Te Kuiti-Puketutu in 1939. and from Tawa Flat to Paekākāriki on the Kāpiti Line in 1940, and extended from Paekākāriki to Paraparaumu in 1943; the continuation of tablet control on the short single-track section would have required staffed tablet stations with a stationmaster and three (tablet) porters at each end of the section (see North–South Junction). This was followed on the NIMT by Puketutu-Kopaki in 1945, between Frankton, Hamilton and Taumarunui from 1954 to 1957; and from Te Kauwhata to Amokura in 1954.

On other lines, CTC was installed between Upper Hutt and Featherston in 1955 and between St Leonards and Oamaru in stages from 1955 to 1959. CTC was completed between Hamilton and Paekākāriki on the NIMT on 12 December 1966.

On the Main South Line CTC was installed from Rolleston to Pukeuri north of Oamaru on the Main South Line in stages from 1969 to completion in February 1980. The older CTC installation from St Leonards to Oamaru was replaced in stages with Track Warrant Control in 1991 and 1992.

The most recent installations of CTC were completed in August 2013 on the MNPL from Marton to Aramoho and from Dunedin to Mosgiel and on the Taieri Gorge Line as far as North Taieri in late 2015.

=== United States ===
CTC-controlled track is significantly more expensive to build than non-signalled track, due to the electronics and failsafes required. CTC is generally implemented in high-traffic areas where the reduced operating cost from increased traffic density and time savings outweigh the capital cost. Most of BNSF Railway's and Union Pacific Railroad's track operates under CTC; the portions that are generally lighter-traffic lines that are operated under Track Warrant Control (BNSF and UP) or Direct Traffic Control (UP).

Recently the costs of CTC has fallen as new technologies such as microwave, satellite and rail based data links have eliminated the need for wire pole lines or fiber optic links. These systems are starting to be called train management systems.

== See also ==
- Advanced Train Control System (ATCS)
- Positive train control
