= CP2 =

CP2 may refer to:

- CP2 (classification), a disability sport classification specific to cerebral palsy
- Ap star, a class of chemically-peculiar stars
- Chicago Pile-2, a later development of CP-1, the World's first artificial nuclear reactor
- Complex projective plane ($\mathbb{CP}^2$), in mathematics
- Ceruloplasmin, an enzyme
- Child's Play 2, a 1990 American horror film
- Warren CP-2, an experimental biplane
- CP2: an EEG electrode site according to the 10-20 system
- Elias MRT station, MRT station code

== See also ==
- 2CP, callsign of ABC South East NSW
- C2P, artillery tractor
- CP (disambiguation)
- CPP (disambiguation)
- CPCP (disambiguation)
