= Interaction energy =

Energy due to interactions within a system

In physics, interaction energy is the contribution to the total energy that is caused by an interaction between the objects being considered.

The interaction energy usually depends on the relative position of the objects. For example, $Q_1 Q_2 / (4 \pi \varepsilon_0 \Delta r)$ is the electrostatic interaction energy between two objects with charges $Q_1$, $Q_2$.

== Interaction energy ==
A straightforward approach for evaluating the interaction energy is to calculate the difference between the objects' combined energy and all of their isolated energies. In the case of two objects, A and B, the interaction energy can be written as:
$$\Delta E_\text{int} = E(A,B) - \left( E(A) + E(B) \right),$$
where $E(A)$ and $E(B)$ are the energies of the isolated objects (monomers), and $E(A,B)$ the energy of their interacting assembly (dimer).

For larger system, consisting of N objects, this procedure can be generalized to provide a total many-body interaction energy:

$$\Delta E_\text{int} = E(A_{1}, A_{2}, \dots, A_{N}) - \sum_{i=1}^{N} E(A_{i}).$$

By calculating the energies for monomers, dimers, trimers, etc., in an N-object system, a complete set of two-, three-, and up to N-body interaction energies can be derived.

The supermolecular approach has an important disadvantage in that the final interaction energy is usually much smaller than the total energies from which it is calculated, and therefore contains a much larger relative uncertainty. In the case where energies are derived from quantum chemical calculations using finite atom-centered basis functions, basis set superposition errors can also contribute some degree of artificial stabilization.

== See also ==
- Energy
- Force
- Interaction
- Ideal solution
- Perturbation theory (quantum mechanics)
- Potential
