= Mangapehi railway station =

Defunct railway station in New Zealand

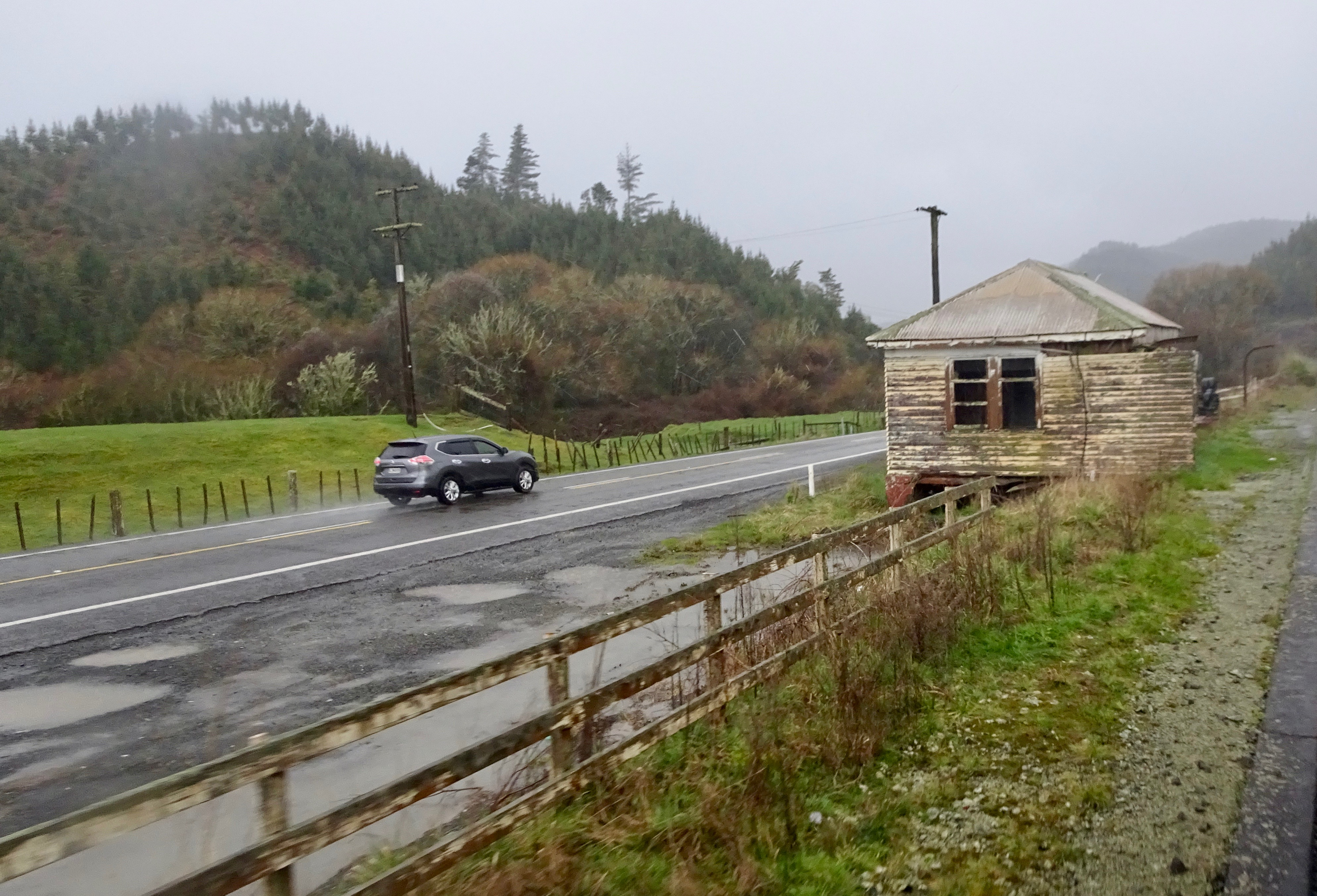
- Mangapehi station in 2018

General information
- Location: New Zealand
- Coordinates: 38.516878°S 175.307722°E
- Elevation: 285 m (935 ft)
- Line: North Island Main Trunk
- Distance: Wellington 449.47 km (279.29 mi)

History
- Opened: 1 April 1901
- Closed: Passenger after September 1980; Goods 31 March 1987
- Rebuilt: 8 January 1950
- Electrified: 24 June 1988

Services
| Preceding station | Historical railways | Following station |
|---|---|---|
| Kopaki; Line open, station closed | North Island Main Trunk; KiwiRail | Poro-O-Tarao; Line open, station closed |
Location

Mangapehi (or Mangapeehi) was a flag station on the North Island Main Trunk line, in the Waitomo District of New Zealand. It was 5.89 km (3.66 mi) north of Poro-O-Tarao and 5.15 km (3.20 mi) south of Kopaki.

Ellis & Burnand had a sawmill at Mangapehi from 1901 until 1968.

== Station move ==
In 1950 the station was moved almost a kilometre north, away from the sawmill, at a cost of £13,405. In that year it had 23,636 passengers, 4 staff and railed 148,093 board feet (349.46 m^{3}) of timber and 28,633 sheep and pigs, earning £3,256 from passengers and £85,473 from freight.

== Tramway ==
A tramway was built into the bush to the east by Ellis and Burnand, initially with 11 mi (18 km) in 1903, and extended further in 1904. By 1909 it was over 14 mi (23 km), which had cost an average of over £1,000 per mile. At 15 mi (24 km) it was slightly longer in 1922. and by 1939 there were over 26 mi (42 km) of tramway and 58 km (36 mi) when trucks took over in the 1950s.

Gradients were up to 1 in 15, requiring the use of geared Climax locos from 1905, which replaced horses on wooden rails. It also linked the station to the coal mines at Maniaiti / Benneydale. The 1904 Climax is now in the Tokomaru Steam Engine Museum, after ending service in 1954 and being briefly joined by another E & B Climax from their Manunui tramway.

Coal from the Mangapehi mine used the line between 1936 and 1952.

== Gallery ==
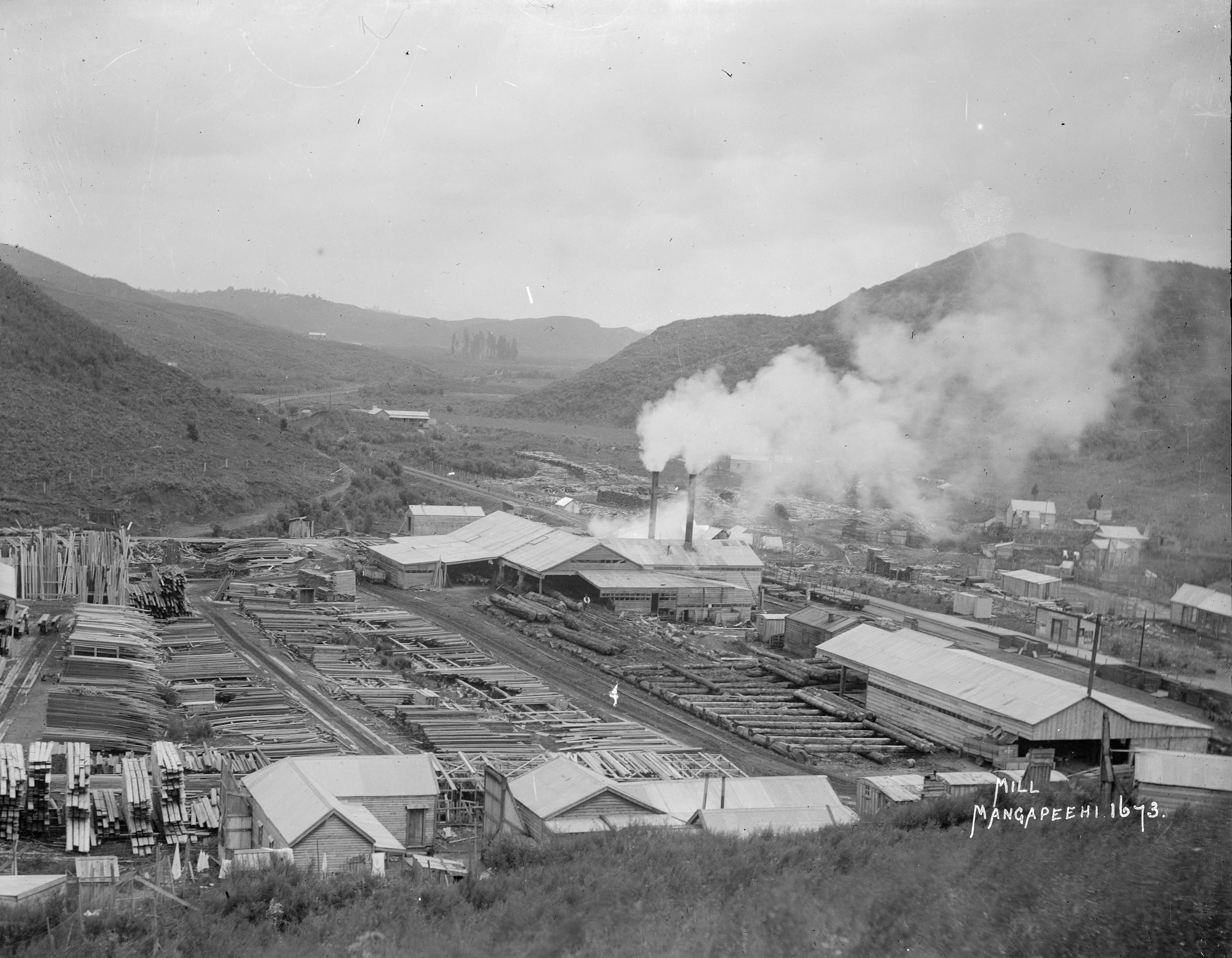
Mangapehi railway station and Ellis and Burnand sawmill before 1930

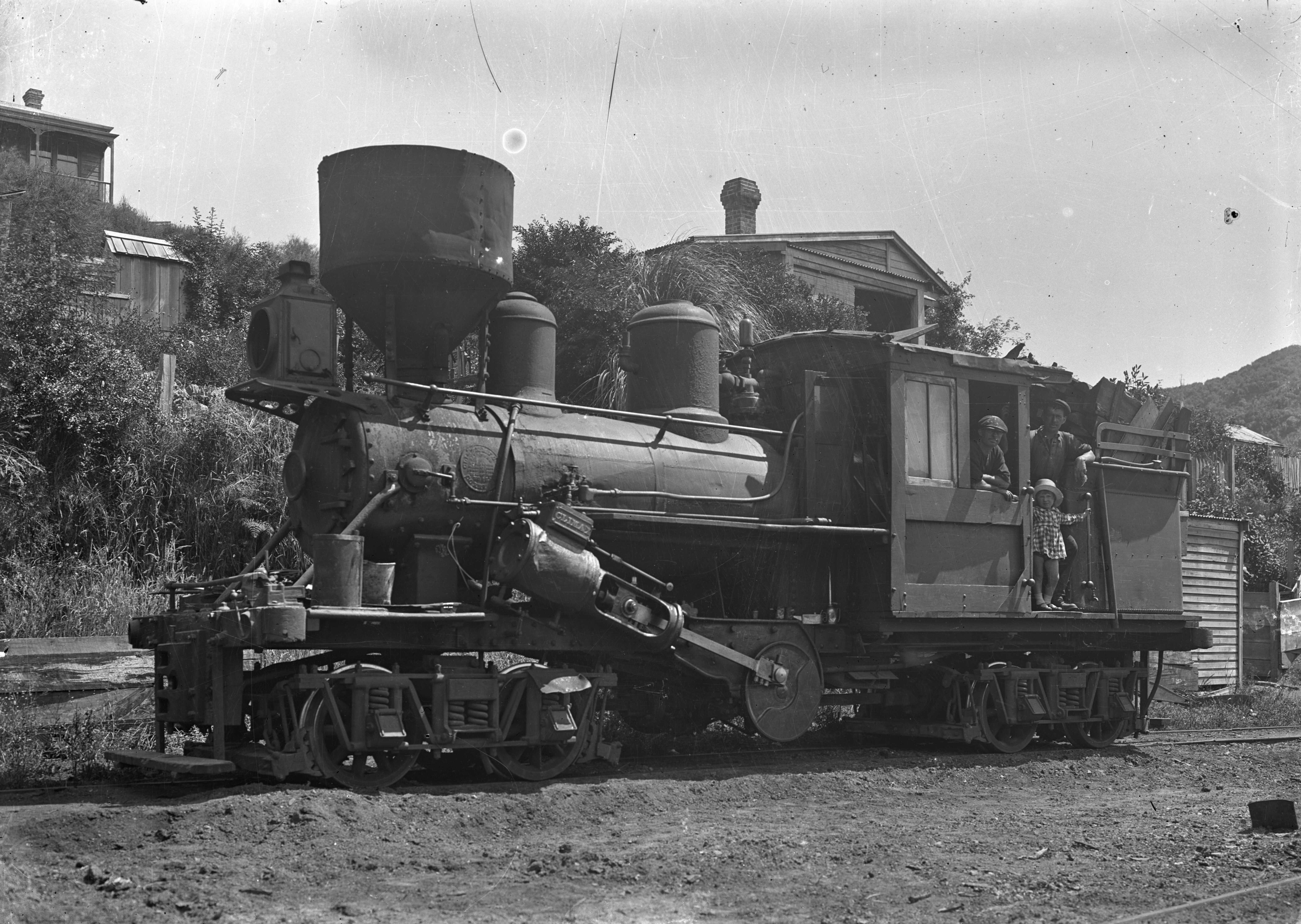
"Climax" locomotive at Mangapehi, in 1920 on Ellis & Burnand tramway.

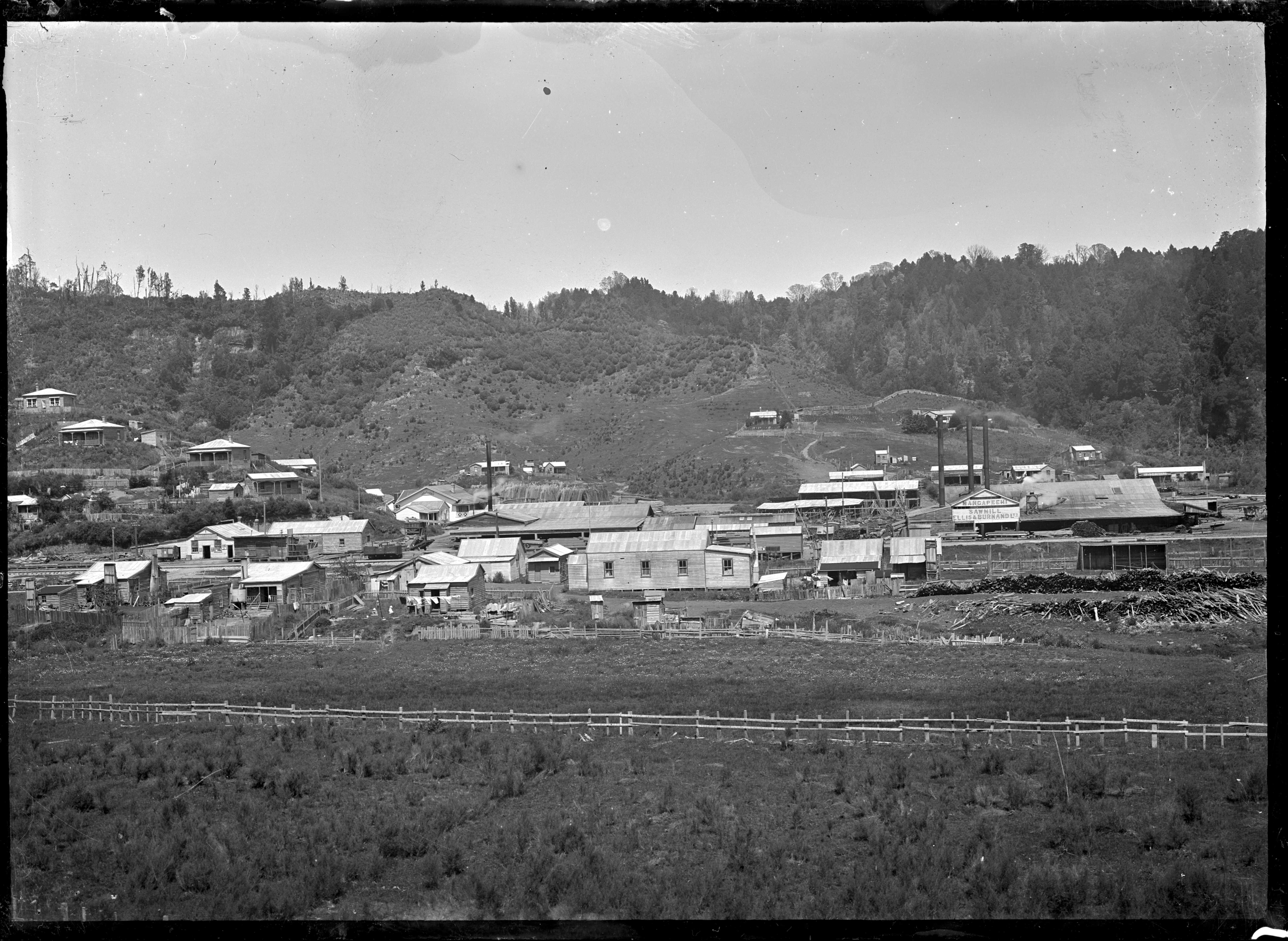
Mangapehi railway station and settlement in 1920
