= Kopaki railway station =

Defunct railway station in New Zealand

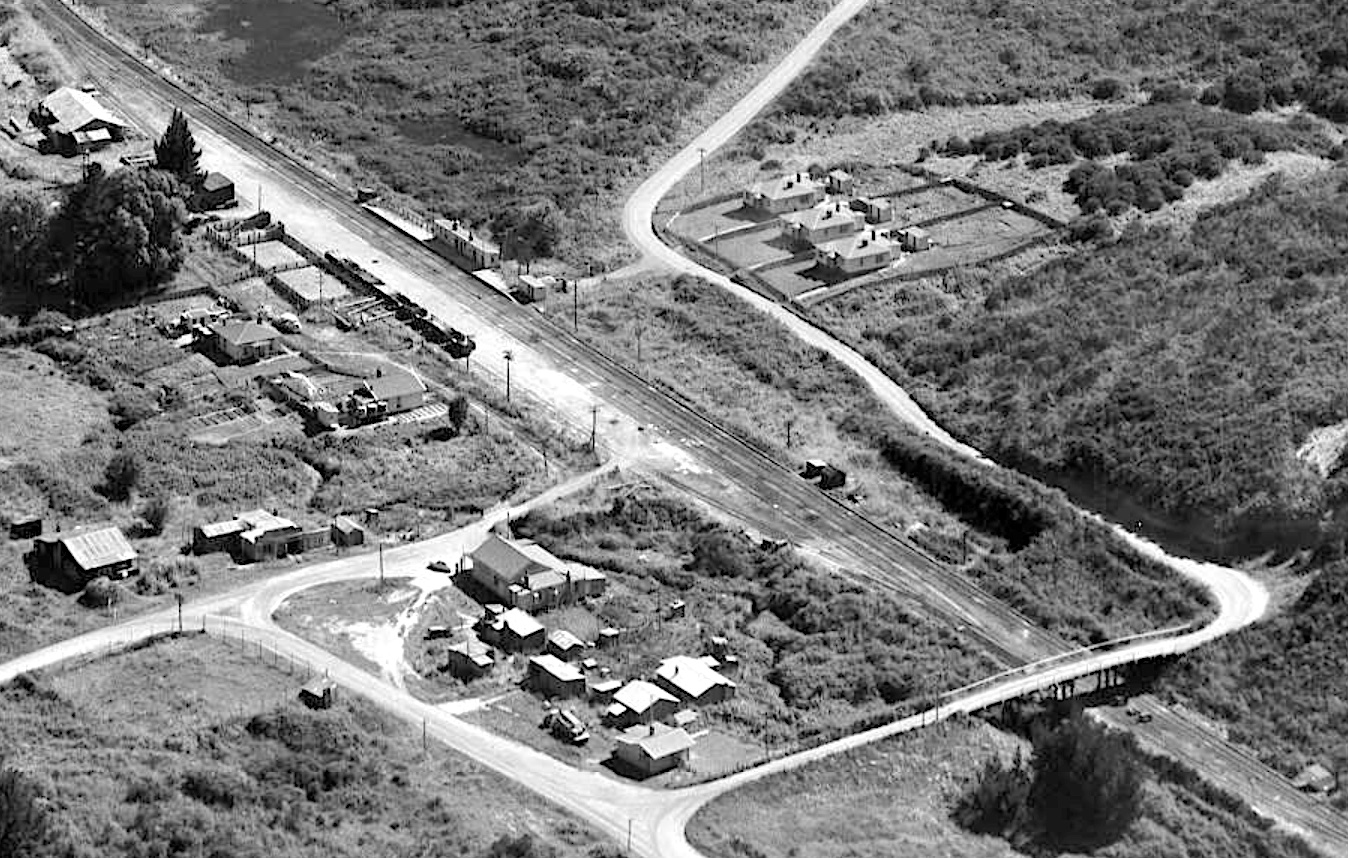
- Kopaki in 1957

General information
- Location: New Zealand
- Coordinates: 38.478387°S 175.273304°E
- Elevation: 265 m (869 ft)
- Line: North Island Main Trunk
- Distance: Wellington 454.62 km (282.49 mi)

History
- Opened: 1 April 1901
- Closed: passengers before 12/1975 goods 31 January 1982
- Electrified: June 1988
- Former names: Paritikona until 8 December 1912

Services
Preceding station	Historical railways	Following station
Puketutu; Line open, station closed 7.21 km (4.48 mi)	North Island Main Trunk; KiwiRail	Mangapehi; Line open, station closed 5.15 km (3.20 mi)
Location

Kopaki was a flag station on the North Island Main Trunk line, in the Waitomo District of New Zealand.

It was part of the Puketutu to Poro-O-Tarao contract, which began in September 1892. From 18 January 1897 a weekly goods train ran to Poro-O-Tarao.

A cattle yard was built in 1920. The passing loop was lengthened in 1939, to hold 219 rather than 97 wagons. The work was done at the same time the loop at Waiteti was installed, the total cost for both being £19,000.

The gradient to the north of the station is 1 in 70.

There was a Farmers Union store at Kopaki in 1920 and a sawmill in 1952.

Kopaki post office was 30 ch (2,000 ft; 600 m) from the railway station.

A 1980 report said there was a concrete block shelter shed and a loop for 121 wagons.

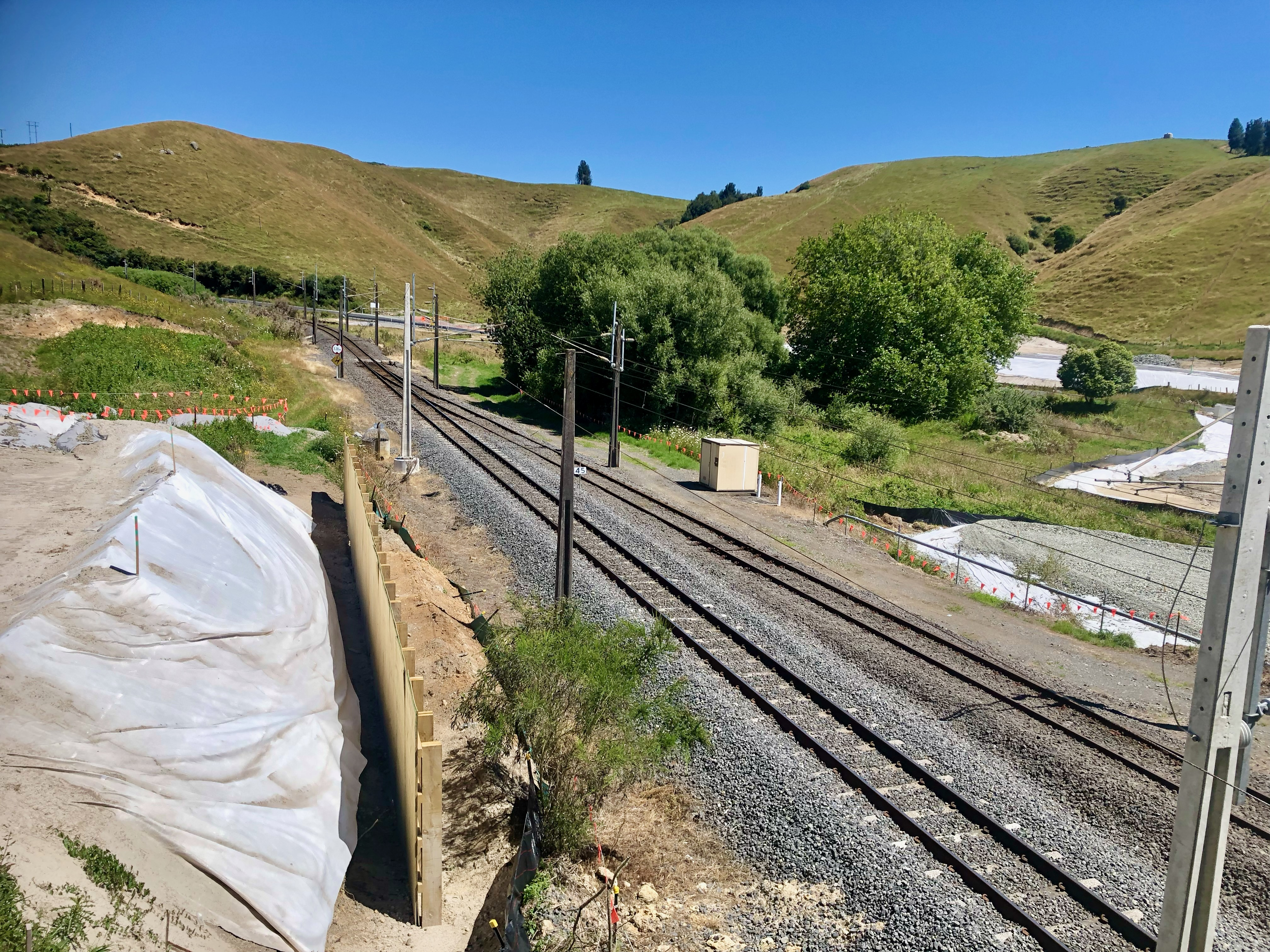
Construction of new SH30 bridge over Kopaki passing loop in 2022

The 1925-26 timber bridge carrying SH30 over the railway was rebuilt between 2021 and 2023 to carry high productivity vehicles. It opened on 26 May 2023 and is skewed, with a length of 68 m (223 ft) and a cost of $12.4m.

Only the shelter shed and passing loop remain.
