= CP =

CP, cp or variants may refer to:

== Arts and media ==
- Cariyapitaka (Cp), a canonical Buddhist story collection
- The Canadian Press, a Canadian news agency
- Cartoon Planet, Cartoon Network television programming block
- Cartoon pornography
- Child pornography
- The Christian Post, an American newspaper
- Competitive programming
- Club Penguin, a now defunct online multiplayer game
- Combat power, used in Pokémon Go to indicate how strong a Pokémon is in battle

== Business and finance terminology ==
- Commercial paper, in global finance, a type of promissory note
- Congestion pricing
- Customer profitability, the profit a firm makes from serving a customer

== Enterprises ==
=== Transportation companies ===
- Canadian Airlines (1987–2001) (IATA airline code CP)
- Canadian Pacific Railway, reporting mark CP
- Central Pacific Railroad, a network of lines between California and Utah, US
- Chemins de Fer de Provence, a French public railway company
- Comboios de Portugal, a Portuguese state-owned train company
- CP Air or Canadian Pacific Air Lines (1942–1987), a Canadian airline
- CP Ships, a Canadian shipping company, part of TUI Group
- Cathay Pacific, a Hong Kong–based major airline

=== Other enterprises ===
- C.P. Company, an Italian apparel brand
- Cedar Point, an amusement park in Sandusky, Ohio, US
- Central Partnership, a Russian film distributor and production company
- Charoen Pokphand (C.P. Group), a Thai agribusiness conglomerate
- Chicago Pneumatic, an American manufacturer of tools and equipment
- Colgate-Palmolive, an American consumer goods company
- Commercial Press, a Chinese publishing company
- Connaught Place, New Delhi, a commercial centre in India
- Curious Pastimes, a UK-based gaming company

== Government, law, and military ==
- Captain of the Parish, a (now mainly ceremonial) appointment in the Isle of Man (post-nominal letters CP)
- Central Powers, a military alliance before and during World War I, led by the German Empire
- Certified Paralegal, an American legal qualification
- Charterparty, a maritime contract for the hire of a ship
- Civil parish, the lowest tier of government in England
- Command Post, in military terminology
- Commissioner of Police, the top-ranking officer of the Police Force
- Communist party, a political party that advocates communism through state policy
- Consejo popular, an electoral ward of Cuba
- Montenegrin Party (Crnogorska partija), a political party in Serbia

== Places ==
- Central provinces (disambiguation) (C.P.)
  - Central Provinces (1861–1936), a former province of India, succeeded by
  - Central Provinces and Berar (1936–1950), corresponding to Madhya Pradesh in the post-partition republic
  - Central Provinces and Berar Circuit or C. P.-Berar Circuit, a Hindi film distribution circuit comprising parts of Madhya Pradesh, Chhattisgarh and Maharashtra
- Clipperton Island, a territory with exceptional country code CP

== Science and technology ==
=== Biology and medicine ===
- Cerebral palsy
- Certified Prosthetist, an American medical qualification
- Ceruloplasmin, an enzyme encoded by the CP gene
- Congenital prosopagnosia, a type of inability to recognize faces
- Chronic pancreatitis

=== Chemistry ===
- Capensinidin (Cp), a blue-red plant dye
- Carbon monophosphide, a diatomic radical chemical compound
- Cassiopium (Cp), a name formerly used for the chemical element Lutetium
- Chlorinated paraffins (CPs), complex mixtures of polychlorinated n-alkanes
- Copernicium, a chemical element, with proposed symbol Cp
- Counterpoise method, a way to correct for basis set superposition error in quantum chemistry
- Cross-polarization
- Cyclopentadienyl complex (Cp), read as "C P", the cyclic C_{5}H_{5} fragment in a coordination complex
  - The similar symbol Cp* ("C P star") represents pentamethylcyclopentadienyl, the C_{5}Me_{5} ligand

=== Drugs ===
- Chlorphenamine, a first-generation alkylamine antihistamine
- Creatine phosphate, a chemical used to store phosphates in the body
- Cyclophosphamide, a medication to suppress the immune system

=== Computing ===
- cp (Unix), a UNIX command for copying files and directories
- Certificate policy, outlining (non)-intended uses of a digital certificate
- Circuit Probe, a method of wafer testing
- Code page, a table identifying the character set used to encode a set of glyphs
- Constraint programming, a programming paradigm wherein relations between variables are stated in the form of constraints
- Control Program, part of an operating system of the late 1960s; see CP/CMS
- Connection pool, a cache of database connections
- 'Content Profile' in the NISO standard Content Profile/Linked Document, a data serialisation format
- Child process, computing process created by another process
- Adobe Captivate, a software application

=== Mathematics ===
- Cauchy problem, in partial differential equations
- Complex projective space (CP^{n}), the projective space with respect to the field of complex numbers
- Mallows's C_{p}, a statistic used in model selection
- The field $\mathbb C_p$; see p-adic number#Algebraic closure
- Process capability index, (C_{p}), a statistical measure of process capability

=== Physics ===
- Candlepower (cp), a measure of luminous intensity
- Centipoise (cP), a unit of viscosity
- CP symmetry, in particle physics, the product of charge conjugation and parity
- C_{p}, the specific heat capacity at constant pressure
- Pressure coefficient (C_{p}), a parameter for studying the flow of fluids
- Center of pressure (fluid mechanics), the point where the total sum of a pressure field acts on a body

=== Other uses in science and technology ===
- Cathodic protection, a technique used to control the corrosion of a metal surface
- Cellphone, a portable telephone device
- Clock pulse, a signal type in electronics
- Complementizer phrase, in linguistics, the syntactic head of a full clause
- Continental Polar (cP), in meteorology, a type of air mass
- Control point, a section of track where switches and signals control trains within a centralized traffic control

== Sport ==
- Cymru Premier, Welsh association football league
- Crystal Palace F.C., English Association Football Club

== Other uses ==
- C. P. (name), shared by several notable individuals
- Camp (disambiguation); the US Census Bureau uses "Cp" as a shorthand for "Camp"
- Ceteris paribus (cp), a Latin phrase commonly rendered as "all other things being equal"
- Colored people
  - See also colored people's time
- Member of the Passionists, a Roman Catholic religious order (post-nominal letters C.P.)
- Compare, a directive to the reader to compare to a cited source (used interchangeably with "cf."); see List of Latin abbreviations
