= Puketutu railway station =

Railway station in New Zealand

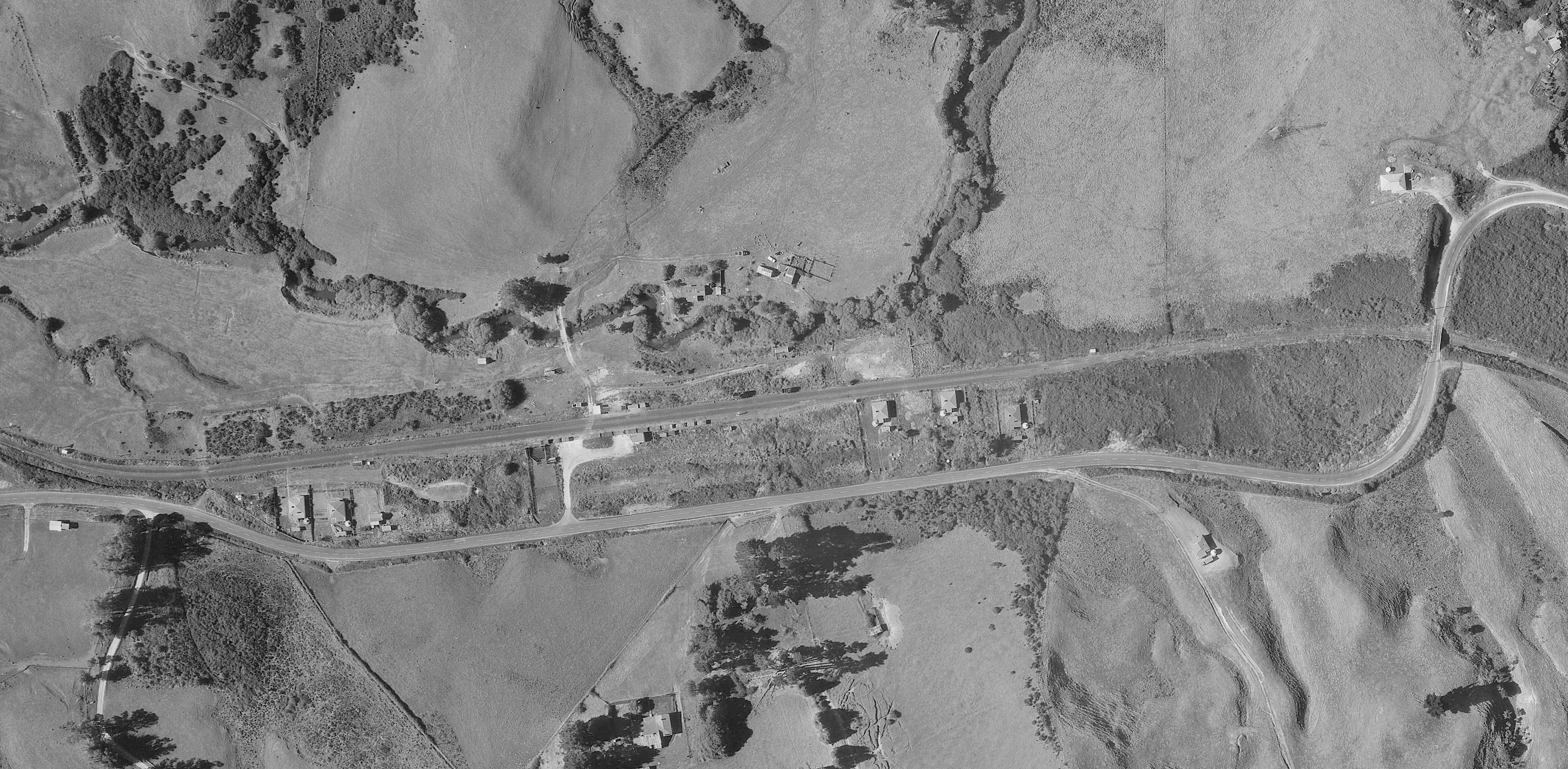
- 1968 aerial view of Puketutu

General information
- Location: New Zealand
- Coordinates: 38.43175°S 175.22917°E
- Elevation: 206 m (676 ft)
- Line: North Island Main Trunk
- Distance: Wellington 461.83 km (286.97 mi)

History
- Opened: 8 May 1889
- Closed: 23 October 1977
- Electrified: 24 June 1988
- Former names: Mokau until 11 May 1903

Services
Preceding station	Historical railways	Following station
Waiteti; Line open, station closed 8.24 km (5.12 mi)	North Island Main Trunk; KiwiRail	Kopaki; Line open, station closed 7.21 km (4.48 mi)
Location

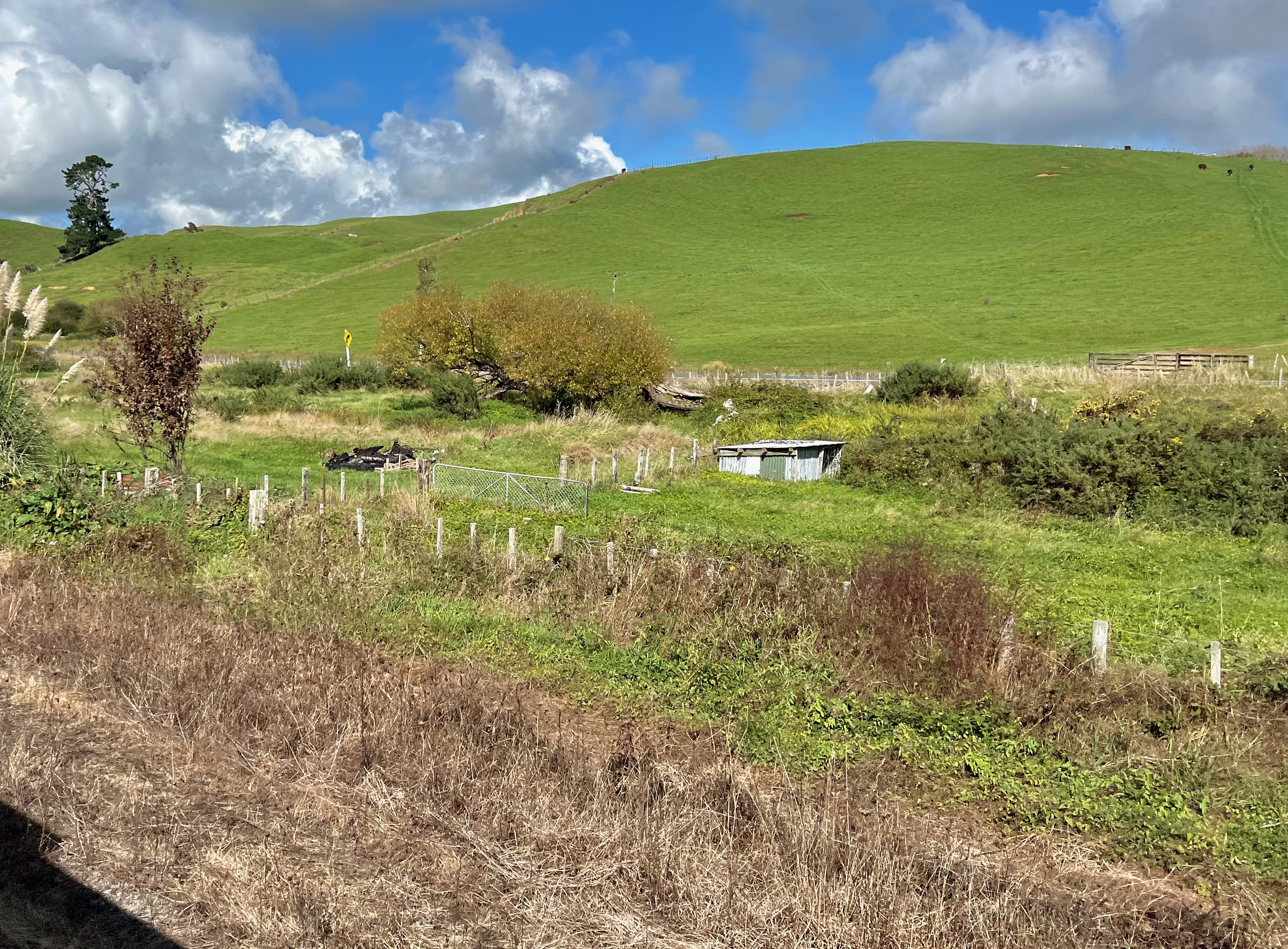
Puketutu station site in 2023. Station and houses have gone

Puketutu was a flag station on the North Island Main Trunk line, in the Waitomo District of New Zealand.

Initial doubt about the route of the line to the south was resolved by a survey in 1884. It was then said that the bush might provide timber traffic for the railway for 50 years, until it was all converted to farm land. Works were advanced enough for a ministerial party to ride the route to the south on horseback by 1890. Most of the construction was done by cooperatives.

The Public Works Department contracted the Te Kuiti to Mokau Station section on 9 March 1887 and it opened just over 2 years later. Construction began on the section south to Poro-O-Tarao tunnel in September 1892. However, for 12 years, from 1889 until the line to Poro-O-Tarao opened on 1 April 1901, Puketutu was the terminus of the line, though, from 18 January 1897, a weekly goods train ran to Poro-O-Tarao. The delay was partly due to poor access and rugged country, but 2 years of the delay were due to economic recession, little work being done from 1890 to 1892.

The name was changed from Mokau to Puketutu on 11 May 1903.

Lack of fencing to the south was an issue when the line opened, with many cattle killed and trains delayed. Although plans for fencing were made in 1885, before the land was bought, it wasn't until 1907 that fencing started and 1909 before it was finished.

By 1911 there was a shelter shed, platform, loading bank, fixed signals and passing loop for 55 wagons, extended to 75 wagons by 1980. In 1915 a Post Office started, run by station staff from 1941 to 1955 and then by a ganger until it closed on 10 December 1966. In 1926 a 22 ft (6.7 m) x 14 ft (4.3 m) lean-to goods shed (22 feet by 14 feet) was approved. A cattle yard was added in 1924. A railway house was added in 1938.

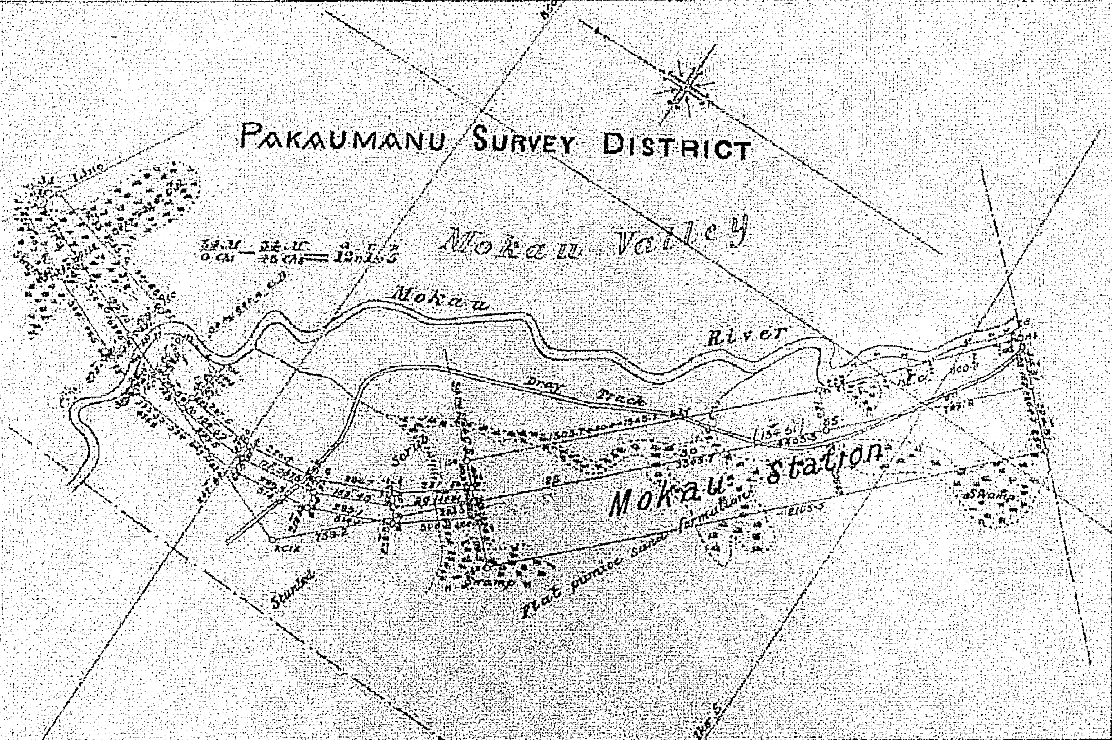
Plan of Mokau (Puketutu) Station on 12 acres 1 rood 5 perches 1880s

A 21 mi (34 km) branch line down the Mokau valley to Piopio and Aria was surveyed, but rejected in a ballot (under the 1914 Local Railways Act) in 1922. A 10 mi (16 km) extension south to a coal seam at Waitewhena was also considered. From 1933 that mine was served via Ohura on the Stratford–Okahukura Line.

The line approaching the station was eased when it was electrified.

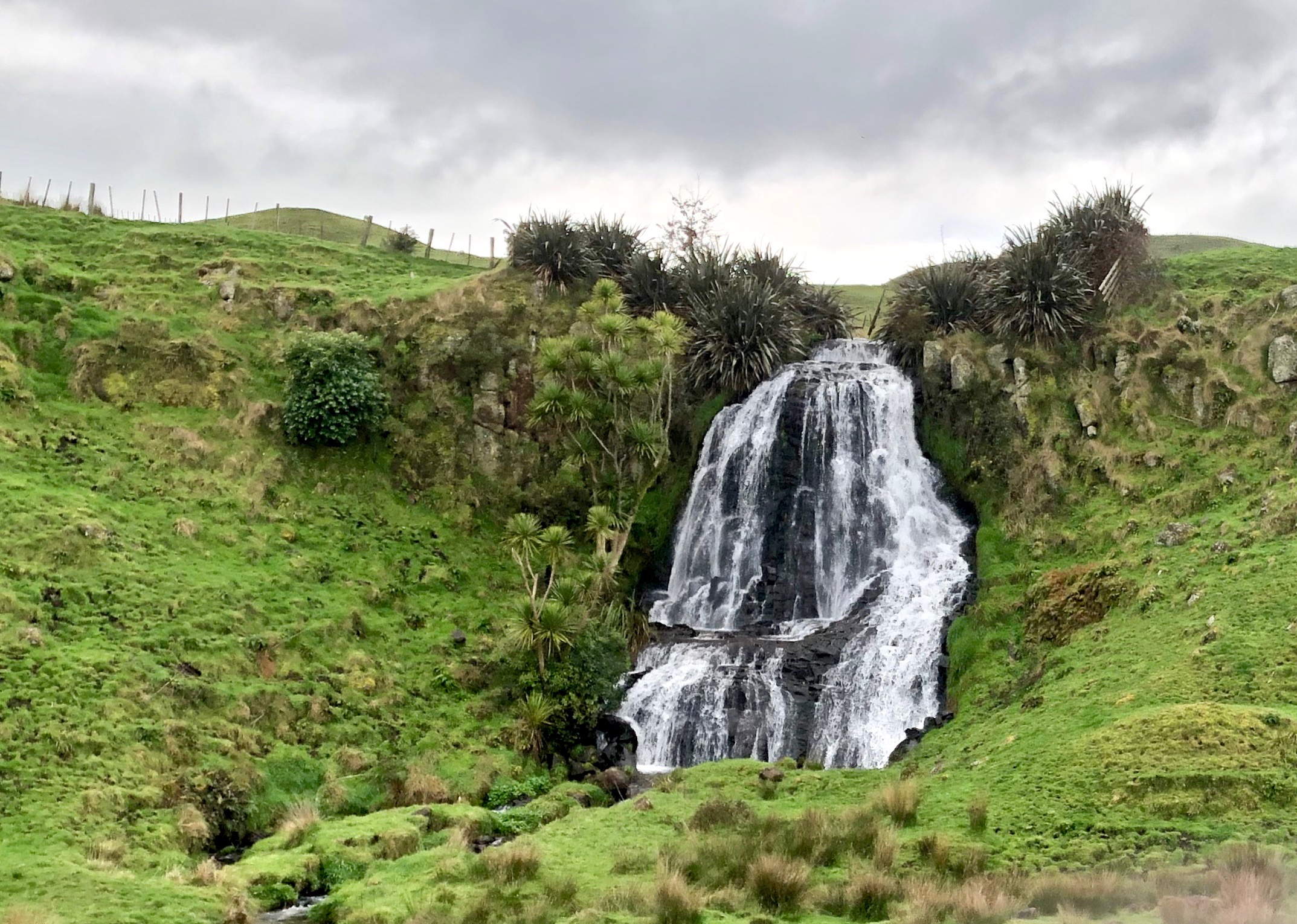
Waiteti Stream waterfall, beside the line, about 2km north of Puketutu
