= C. P. Sinha =

Indian politician

Member of Bihar Legislative Council
- Preceded by: Manzar Alam, Janata Dal (United)

Personal details
- Party: Janata Dal (United)

CP Sinha is a senior leader of the Janata Dal (United). He was elected unopposed to the Bihar Legislative Council on 3 June 2016.

== Life ==
Sinha belongs to Koeri caste and is associated with Kushwaha Rajnaitik Vichar Manch, an organisation working for political rights of the Koeri community. As a member of this organisation, he advocated that JDU should contest from Ujiarpur Lok Sabha constituency in place of Bharatiya Janata Party, with Ashwamedh Devi as its candidate. He also advocated ministerial berth for Ram Balak Singh Kushwaha in Government of Bihar.
