= Te Kuiti railway station =

Railway station in New Zealand

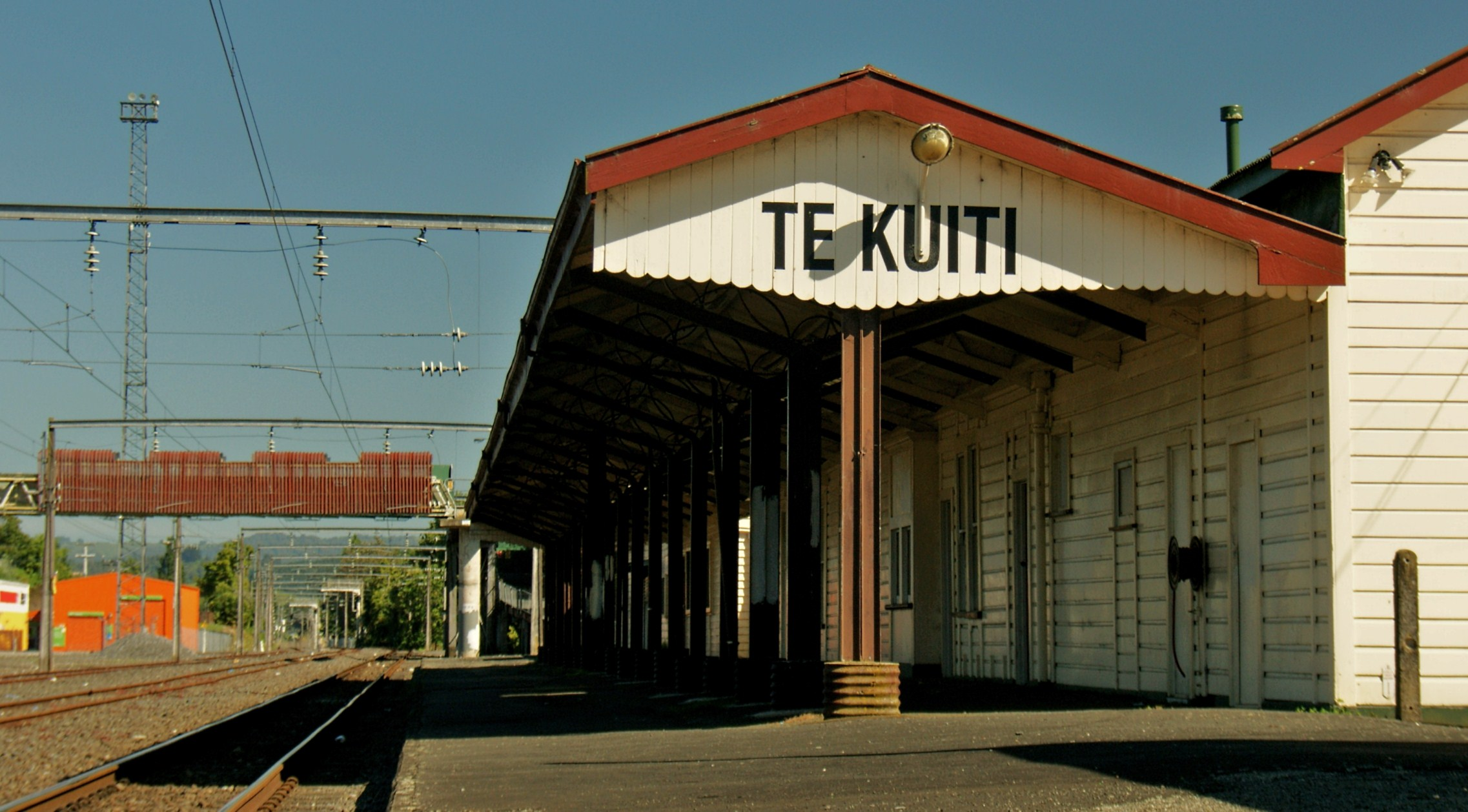
- Te Kuiti Rail Station

General information
- Location: New Zealand
- Coordinates: 38.335732°S 175.166187°E
- Elevation: 54 m (177 ft)
- Line: North Island Main Trunk
- Distance: Wellington 475.66 km (295.56 mi)

Construction
- Architectural style: Troup Class B

Other information
- Classification: RHTNZ Category A

History
- Opened: 2 September 1887 goods 2 December 1887 passenger
- Closed: 24 June 2012 except for groups of 10+
- Rebuilt: 1908, moved 1911, extended 1929, 1951 and 1957
- Electrified: June 1988

Services
Preceding station	Historical railways	Following station
Te Kumi; Line open, station closed 3.34 km (2.08 mi)	North Island Main Trunk; KiwiRail	Waiteti; Line open, station closed 5.59 km (3.47 mi)

Heritage New Zealand – Category 2
- Designated: 5 September 1985
- Reference no.: 4450
Location

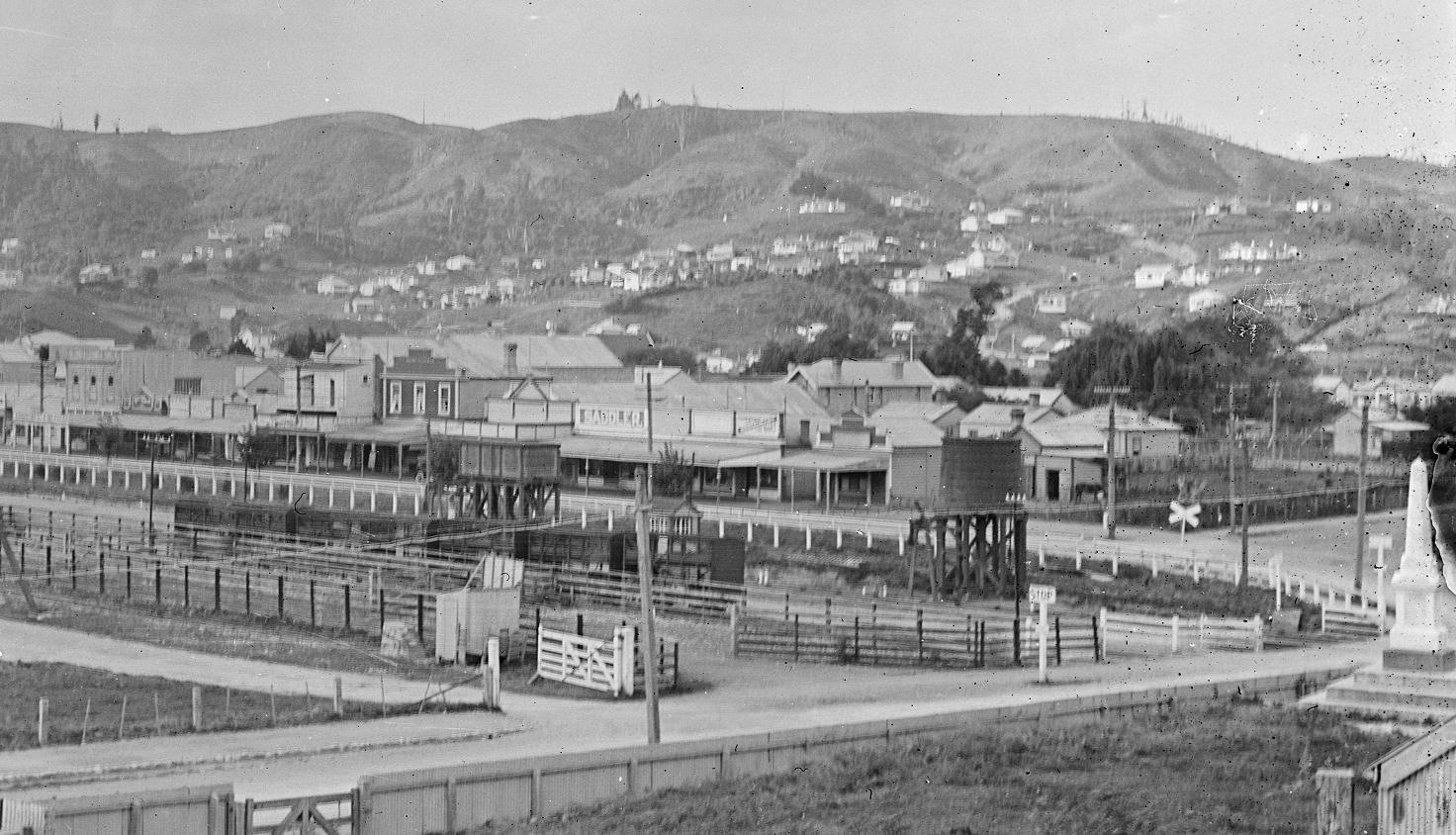
Te Kuiti 1917

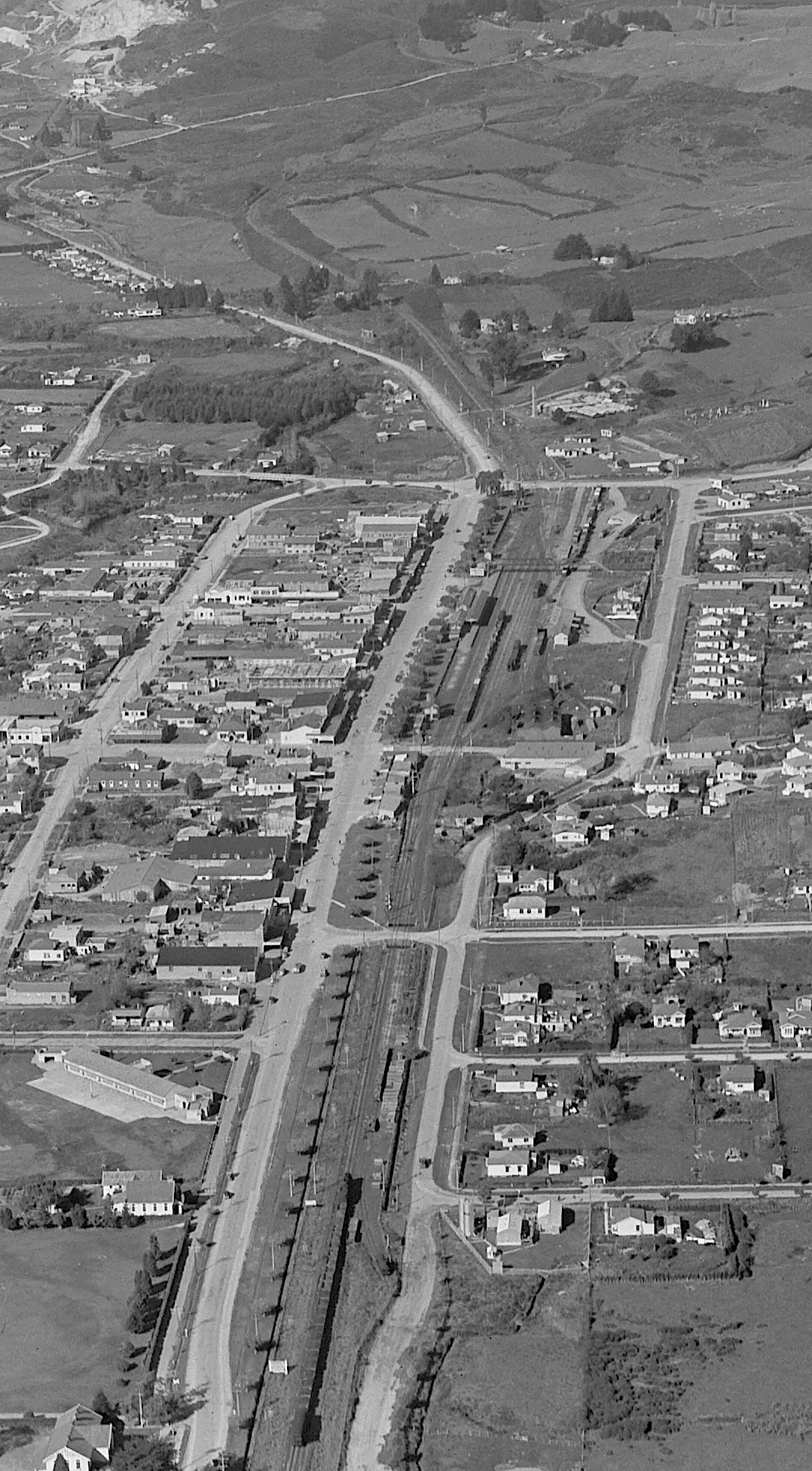
20 May 1947 Te Kuiti; the distinctive station is visible in the central area of the upper half of the image

Te Kuiti railway station is a station on the North Island Main Trunk in New Zealand. The station was important in the growth of Te Kūiti.

== History ==
Tenders for the 11 mi 41 ch (18.5 km) extension of the NIMT from Ōtorohanga to Te Kuiti were invited in August 1885. but work was suspended from 17 September 1885 after William Russell got Parliamentary support to cut spending on public works. A year later Coates & Metcalfe of Hamilton won the construction contract for £17,273 in September 1886 and work started quickly. The line opened on 2 September 1887 for goods. By October 1887 goods trains ran on Mondays and Fridays and the station was being built. A contract with Arthur Burn for the station buildings was signed on 29 August 1887 and they were completed by 19 December. New Zealand Railways Department took over from the contractors, adding a passenger service on those days from 2 December 1887. Te Kuiti was the terminus for over a year, until the 8 mi 65 ch (14.2 km) extension to Puketutu opened on Wednesday 8 May 1889. By November 1889 Te Kuiti had lost its stationmaster and become a flag station. However, by 1896 there was a 4th class station, platform, cart approach, 40 ft (12 m) by 30 ft (9.1 m) goods shed, cattle yards, water supply from a well, coal bunker, engine shed, loading bank, urinals and a passing loop for 31 wagons. There was a Post Office at the station until 1907, when a stationmaster was reappointed and railway houses, a 50 ft (15 m) turntable and more sidings were built.

The first Auckland - Wellington through expresses ran on 14 February 1909, taking 19 hours 13 minutes, and stopping at Te Kuiti. Since then, trains calling have included The Overlander, Blue Streak, Silver Fern, Scenic Daylight, Daylight Limited, Northerner and Night Limited. Since 2012 it has only seen occasional calls by excursions and to set down or pick up groups of 10 or more, booked on the Northern Explorer.

In 1910 a bookstall was added. More houses were built in 1910, 1927, 1952, 1953 and 1955. Electric lighting came in 1911, by which time the goods shed was 110 ft (34 m) long and there were sheep yards. In 1940 a new goods shed and stockyards were completed. The goods shed was extended by 60 ft (18 m) in 1952.

Te Kuiti had an engine shed from 1887. It was improved in 1911. By 1919 it had 5 engines and by 1924 2 of its 6 had to remain outside. On 28 January 1925 engine A 424 was on the turntable when it cracked. It was replaced by a turntable from East Town until £1,060 was spent on a new 70 foot turntable later in the year. B^{B} engines were also stabled at Te Kuiti, which had 8 engines by 1928.

By 1966 the coaling bunker had been removed, the engine shed was in poor condition and a diesel shunter had replaced steam engines. By 1968 the shed was demolished and the turntable was removed.

== Listed building ==
Since 1985 the building has been listed NZHPT Category II. The Rail Heritage Trust describes the station as, "the finest remaining example of a standard class B station". It dates from 1908 (the old station was moved to Ongarue), when George Troup (best known for Dunedin railway station) was the head of railway architecture. After a deputation to the Minister, it was moved from the west to the east (town side) of the tracks in 1911, and a verandah was added. The station is of weatherboard, with a corrugated-iron roof, gabled at both ends, originally 103 ft (31 m) long, but extended in 1929, 1951 and 1957. The alterations are evidenced by double-hung sash windows either side, but casement windows to the south. In 1921 it was proposed that NZR take over the refreshment rooms. In 1968 the corrugated iron refreshment building was reported as built in 1956.

A 'Revitalisation Project' started in 2014 to provide for arts and crafts groups, an education centre, youth projects, historical displays and a meeting room.

== Patronage ==
As shown in the table and graph below, passenger numbers peaked in 1944 -

year	tickets	season tickets	staff	source	title
1888	1,600		1	https://paperspast.natlib.govt.nz/parliamentary/appendix-to-the-journals-of-the-house-of-representatives/1889/I/1068?large_image=true	RETURN No. 10. STATEMENT of Revenue and Expenditure of each Station for the Twelve Months ending 31 March 1888
1908	11,955	12	5	https://paperspast.natlib.govt.nz/parliamentary/appendix-to-the-journals-of-the-house-of-representatives/1908/I/2061	RETURN No. 12. STATEMENT of Revenue and Expenditure of each Station for the Year ended 31 March 1908
1909	19,530	67	10	https://paperspast.natlib.govt.nz/parliamentary/appendix-to-the-journals-of-the-house-of-representatives/1909/II/1832	RETURN No. 12. STATEMENT of Revenue and Expenditure of each Station for the Year ended 31 March 1909
1910	22,033	39	9	https://paperspast.natlib.govt.nz/parliamentary/appendix-to-the-journals-of-the-house-of-representatives/1910/I/2050	RETURN No. 12. STATEMENT of Revenue and Expenditure of each Station for the Year ended 31 March 1910
1911	26,284	137	9	https://paperspast.natlib.govt.nz/parliamentary/appendix-to-the-journals-of-the-house-of-representatives/1911/I/2497	RETURN No. 12. STATEMENT of Revenue and Expenditure of each Station for the Year ended 31 March 1911
1912	35,314	76	11	https://paperspast.natlib.govt.nz/parliamentary/appendix-to-the-journals-of-the-house-of-representatives/1912/II/2420	RETURN No. 12. STATEMENT of Revenue and Expenditure of each Station for the Year ended 31 March 1912
1913	37,131	124	15	https://paperspast.natlib.govt.nz/parliamentary/appendix-to-the-journals-of-the-house-of-representatives/1913/I/3693	RETURN No. 12. STATEMENT of Revenue and Expenditure of each Station for the Year ended 31 March 1913
1914	37,856	157		https://paperspast.natlib.govt.nz/parliamentary/appendix-to-the-journals-of-the-house-of-representatives/1914/I/2031	RETURN No. 12. Statement of Revenue for each Station for the Year ended 31 March 1914
1915	40,989	121		https://paperspast.natlib.govt.nz/parliamentary/appendix-to-the-journals-of-the-house-of-representatives/1915/I/1638	RETURN No. 12. Statement of Revenue for each Station for the Year ended 31 March 1915
1916	46,256	143		https://paperspast.natlib.govt.nz/parliamentary/appendix-to-the-journals-of-the-house-of-representatives/1916/I/1053	RETURN No. 12. Statement of Revenue for each Station for the Year ended 31 March 1916
1917	45,307	210		https://paperspast.natlib.govt.nz/parliamentary/appendix-to-the-journals-of-the-house-of-representatives/1917/I/1123	RETURN No. 12. Statement of Revenue for each Station for the Year ended 31 March 1917
1918	44,454	207		https://paperspast.natlib.govt.nz/parliamentary/appendix-to-the-journals-of-the-house-of-representatives/1918/I-II/1159	RETURN No. 12. Statement of Revenue for each Station for the Year ended 31 March 1918
1919	47,470	161		https://paperspast.natlib.govt.nz/parliamentary/appendix-to-the-journals-of-the-house-of-representatives/1919/I/1231	RETURN No. 12. Statement of Revenue for each Station for the Year ended 31 March 1919
1920	54,829	362		https://paperspast.natlib.govt.nz/parliamentary/appendix-to-the-journals-of-the-house-of-representatives/1920/I/1349	RETURN No. 12. Statement of Revenue for each Station for the Year ended 31 March 1920
1921	60,712	282		https://paperspast.natlib.govt.nz/parliamentary/appendix-to-the-journals-of-the-house-of-representatives/1921/I-II/1452	RETURN No. 12. Statement of Revenue for each Station for the Year ended 31 March 1921
1922	56,353	563		https://paperspast.natlib.govt.nz/parliamentary/appendix-to-the-journals-of-the-house-of-representatives/1922/I/1409	RETURN No. 12. Statement of Revenue for each Station for the Year ended 31 March 1922
1923	54,492	451		https://paperspast.natlib.govt.nz/parliamentary/appendix-to-the-journals-of-the-house-of-representatives/1923/I-II/1321	RETURN No. 12. Statement of Revenue for each Station for the Year ended 31 March 1923
1924	56,536	366		https://paperspast.natlib.govt.nz/parliamentary/appendix-to-the-journals-of-the-house-of-representatives/1924/I/2458	RETURN No. 12. Statement of Revenue for each Station for the Year ended 31 March 1924
1925	59,092	419		https://paperspast.natlib.govt.nz/parliamentary/appendix-to-the-journals-of-the-house-of-representatives/1925/I/1804	RETURN No. 12. Statement of Traffic and Revenue for each Station for the Year ended 31 March 1925
1926	59,363	623		https://paperspast.natlib.govt.nz/parliamentary/appendix-to-the-journals-of-the-house-of-representatives/1926/I/1930	STATEMENT No. 18 Statement of Traffic and Revenue for each Station for the Year ended 31 March 1926
1927	55,784	902		https://paperspast.natlib.govt.nz/parliamentary/appendix-to-the-journals-of-the-house-of-representatives/1927/I/2230	STATEMENT No. 18 Statement of Traffic and Revenue for each Station for the Year ended 31 March 1927
1928	50,060	454		https://paperspast.natlib.govt.nz/parliamentary/appendix-to-the-journals-of-the-house-of-representatives/1928/I/2628	STATEMENT No. 18 Statement of Traffic and Revenue for each Station for the Year ended 31 March 1928
1929	51,133	667		https://paperspast.natlib.govt.nz/parliamentary/appendix-to-the-journals-of-the-house-of-representatives/1929/I/2090	STATEMENT No. 18 Statement of Traffic and Revenue for each Station for the Year ended 31 March 1929
1930	51,039	571		https://paperspast.natlib.govt.nz/parliamentary/appendix-to-the-journals-of-the-house-of-representatives/1930/I/2212	STATEMENT No. 18 Statement of Traffic and Revenue for each Station for the Year ended 31 March 1930
1931	54,436	444		https://paperspast.natlib.govt.nz/parliamentary/appendix-to-the-journals-of-the-house-of-representatives/1931/I-II/1778	STATEMENT No. 18 Statement of Traffic and Revenue for each Station for the Year ended 31 March 1931
1932	43,379	378		https://paperspast.natlib.govt.nz/parliamentary/appendix-to-the-journals-of-the-house-of-representatives/1932/I-II/1934	STATEMENT No. 18 Statement of Traffic and Revenue for each Station for the Year ended 31 March 1932
1933	43,925	347		https://paperspast.natlib.govt.nz/parliamentary/appendix-to-the-journals-of-the-house-of-representatives/1933/I/1388	STATEMENT No. 18 Statement of Traffic and Revenue for each Station for the Year ended 31 March 1933
1934	45,773	505		https://paperspast.natlib.govt.nz/parliamentary/appendix-to-the-journals-of-the-house-of-representatives/1934/I/2278	STATEMENT No. 18 Statement of Traffic and Revenue for each Station for the Year ended 31 March 1934
1935	50,191	381		https://paperspast.natlib.govt.nz/parliamentary/appendix-to-the-journals-of-the-house-of-representatives/1935/I/1326	STATEMENT No. 18 Statement of Traffic and Revenue for each Station for the Year ended 31 March 1935
1936	56,666	390		https://paperspast.natlib.govt.nz/parliamentary/appendix-to-the-journals-of-the-house-of-representatives/1936/I/1552	STATEMENT No. 18 Statement of Traffic and Revenue for each Station for the Year ended 31 March 1936
1937	67,514	359		https://paperspast.natlib.govt.nz/parliamentary/appendix-to-the-journals-of-the-house-of-representatives/1937/I/1896	STATEMENT No. 18 Statement of Traffic and Revenue for each Station for the Year ended 31 March 1937
1938	65,919	297		https://paperspast.natlib.govt.nz/parliamentary/appendix-to-the-journals-of-the-house-of-representatives/1938/I/1652	STATEMENT No. 18 Statement of Traffic and Revenue for each Station for the Year ended 31 March 1938
1939	61,697	231		https://paperspast.natlib.govt.nz/parliamentary/appendix-to-the-journals-of-the-house-of-representatives/1939/I/1970	STATEMENT No. 18 Statement of Traffic and Revenue for each Station for the Year ended 31 March 1939
1940	62,456	108		https://paperspast.natlib.govt.nz/parliamentary/appendix-to-the-journals-of-the-house-of-representatives/1940/I/1314	STATEMENT No. 18 Statement of Traffic and Revenue for each Station for the Year ended 31 March 1940
1941	64,188	123		https://paperspast.natlib.govt.nz/parliamentary/appendix-to-the-journals-of-the-house-of-representatives/1941/I/1203	STATEMENT No. 18 Statement of Traffic and Revenue for each Station for the Year ended 31 March 1941
1942	77,160	292		https://paperspast.natlib.govt.nz/parliamentary/appendix-to-the-journals-of-the-house-of-representatives/1942/I/651	STATEMENT No. 18 Statement of Traffic and Revenue for each Station for the Year ended 31 March 1942
1943	90,203	279		https://paperspast.natlib.govt.nz/parliamentary/appendix-to-the-journals-of-the-house-of-representatives/1943/I/679	STATEMENT No. 18 Statement of Traffic and Revenue for each Station for the Year ended 31 March 1943
1944	93,147	116		https://paperspast.natlib.govt.nz/parliamentary/appendix-to-the-journals-of-the-house-of-representatives/1944/I/895	STATEMENT No. 18 Statement of Traffic and Revenue for each Station for the Year ended 31 March 1944
1945	81,064	39		https://paperspast.natlib.govt.nz/parliamentary/appendix-to-the-journals-of-the-house-of-representatives/1945/I/969	STATEMENT No. 18 Statement of Traffic and Revenue for each Station for the Year ended 31 March 1945
1946	81,524	67		https://paperspast.natlib.govt.nz/parliamentary/appendix-to-the-journals-of-the-house-of-representatives/1946/I/1548	STATEMENT No. 18 Statement of Traffic and Revenue for each Station for the Year ended 31 March 1946
1947	77,837	79		https://paperspast.natlib.govt.nz/parliamentary/appendix-to-the-journals-of-the-house-of-representatives/1947/I/2495	STATEMENT No. 18 Statement of Traffic and Revenue for each Station for the Year ended 31 March 1947
1948	69,958	92		https://paperspast.natlib.govt.nz/parliamentary/appendix-to-the-journals-of-the-house-of-representatives/1948/I/2521	STATEMENT No. 18 Statement of Traffic and Revenue for each Station for the Year ended 31 March 1948
1949	68,323	99		https://paperspast.natlib.govt.nz/parliamentary/appendix-to-the-journals-of-the-house-of-representatives/1949/I/2104	STATEMENT No. 18 Statement of Traffic and Revenue for each Station for the Year ended 31 March 1949
1950	67,472	70		https://paperspast.natlib.govt.nz/parliamentary/appendix-to-the-journals-of-the-house-of-representatives/1950/I/2366	STATEMENT No. 18 Statement of Traffic and Revenue for each Station for the Year ended 31 March 1950

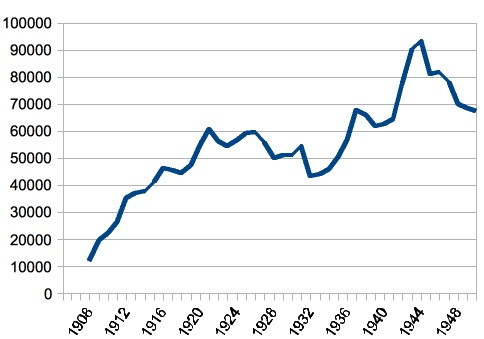
tickets sales 1908–1950 – derived from annual returns to Parliament of "Statement of Revenue for each Station for the Year ended"
