= Poro-O-Tarao railway station =

Former train station in New Zealand

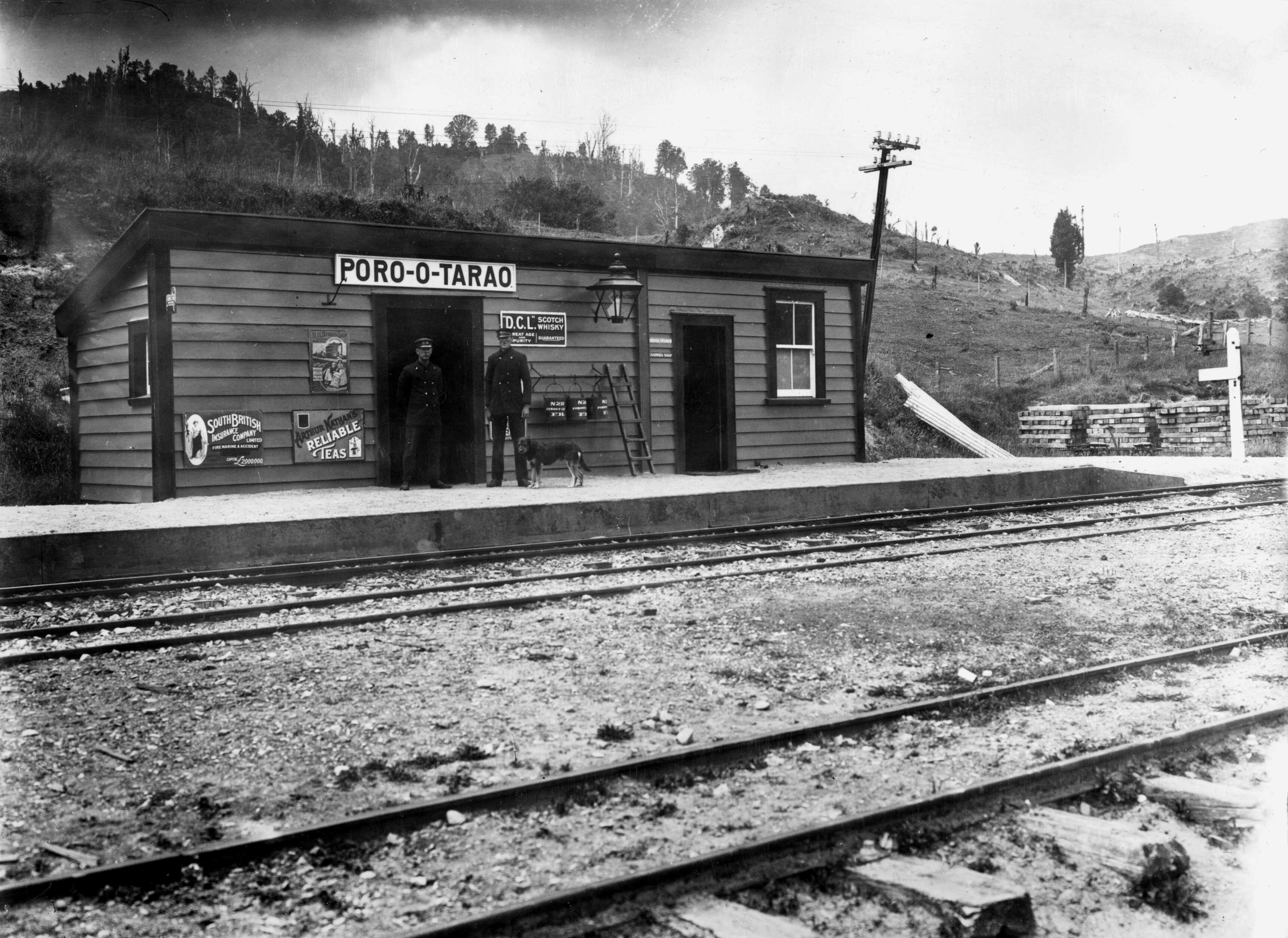
- Poro-O-Tarao railway station about 1910

General information
- Location: Poro-O-Tarao; New Zealand
- Coordinates: 38.549743°S 175.314288°E
- Elevation: 339 m (1,112 ft)
- Line: North Island Main Trunk
- Distance: Wellington 443.58 km (275.63 mi)

History
- Opened: 1 April 1901
- Closed: 10 May 1976
- Electrified: 24 June 1988

Services
Preceding station	Historical railways	Following station
Mangapehi; Line open, station closed	North Island Main Trunk; KiwiRail	Waimiha; Line open, station closed
Location

Poro-O-Tarao (or Porootarao) was a flag station on the North Island Main Trunk line, in the Waitomo District of New Zealand. Between the watersheds of the upper Mōkau and Whanganui rivers, the NIMT enters Poro-O-Tarao tunnel under Tihikārearea hill, before descending the Ōngarue valley. It was 9.68 km (6.01 mi) north of Waimiha and 5.89 km (3.66 mi) south of Mangapehi.

For 2 years, from 1 April 1901 until the line to Taumarunui opened on 1 December 1903, Poro-O-Tarao was the terminus of the line from Auckland, though the rails reached Poro-O-Tarao on 1 December 1896 and, from 18 January 1897, a weekly goods train ran through from Puketutu. Work on the Mōkau station to Poro-O-Tarao tunnel section had started in September 1892. It was officially open for traffic on 21 December 1896. Work on the Ohinemoa section (Poro-O-Tarao tunnel to Te Kawakawa, south of Ōngarue) started by December 1897.

Although the station closed for goods in 1976, it remained open for Ministry of Works traffic, during construction of the new tunnel, until 10 November 1980. There was also a station at Porootarao South from about November 1898 till about November 1902.

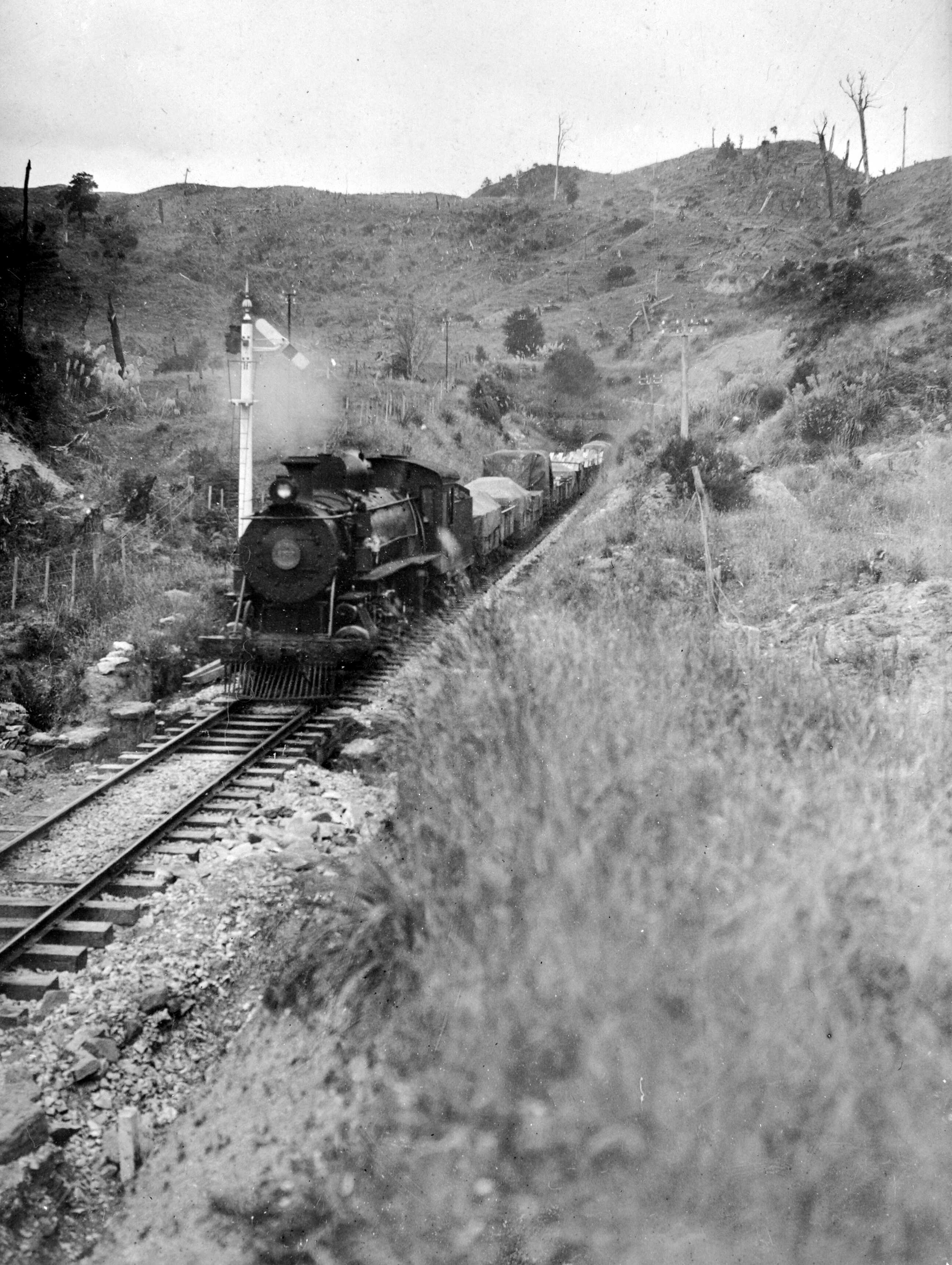
Train coming out of Poro-O-Tarao tunnel about 1910

== Poro-O-Tarao Tunnel ==
The tunnel to the south of the station was 53 ch (3,500 ft; 1,100 m) long. The Public Works Department awarded a contract to J. J. O'Brien for the Poro-O-Tarao section (including tunnel) in August 1885. The PWD originally required an impossible contract time of two years, and also that it be built before the railway reached Te Kuiti (the railhead did not reach the site until 1897) so materials had to be taken over 46 miles (74 km) of roadless wilderness. Richard Seddon later said that if the line had been built to the site first, the tunnel could have been built more cheaply and easily.

Work began on the tunnel in 1886 and was complete by 27 August 1890.

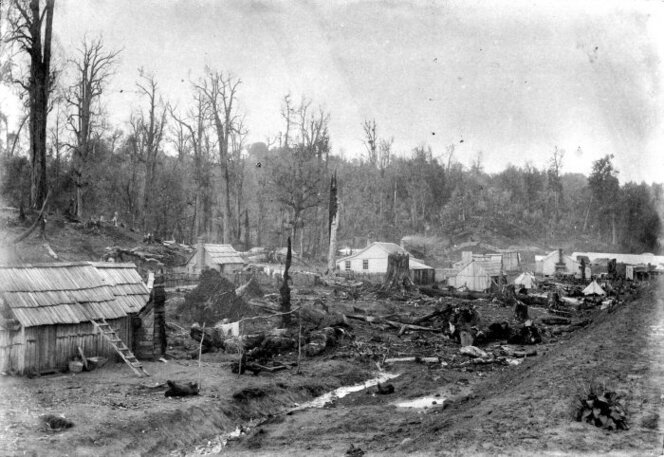
1886 construction camp at Poro-O-Tarau

Te Ihingārangi had been promised the railway would go around Tihikārearea, home to 23 sacred healing trees and other tapu sites. Local hapū were only alerted to the Government's plans to construct the railway directly through Tihikārearea when construction workers arrived to begin work on the tunnel, around 1886. They told the workers not to put the track through the sacred ground, and tapu poles were put in the railway's path by tohunga. However, the sacred grove was felled before tohunga could remove the tapu, and was said to have caused people to die of illnesses that traditional Māori medicine could have cured. The trees were used for railway sleepers. Also, construction polluted a puna wai tapu (holy spring) where tohunga lived.

In 1935 the driver and fireman of a northbound goods train were overcome by fumes in the tunnel and the Class A^{A} locomotive crashed and overturned at the station, along with 12 of the train's 46 trucks. Several cattle and sheep were killed, but there were no other casualties.

Poro-O-Tarao was one of the smallest tunnels on the NIMT. As a result, prior to 1920, it had had its invert lowered to allow larger rolling stock. The tunnel is in weak mudstones with considerable ground water. Steel props supported the base of the walls above the lowered invert. Failures of these props and the tunnel's drainage resulted in areas of significant inward cracking of the brickwork. In 1934 a 45 m (148 ft) bulging length was rebuilt to the original profile with a reinforced concrete invert. In 1965 a further 12 m (39 ft) was replaced to improve clearance and to investigate the feasibility of enlarging the old tunnel. The proposal was abandoned as it would have taken at least 9 years and cost twice as much.

Thus, when the railway was electrified, a new 6 m (20 ft) diameter, 1,272 m (4,173 ft) tunnel was built to the west. It goes through Mahoenui Group soft sedimentary rocks, including landslides; the cause of hummocky ground and many small scarps. A drive at the north portal showed gently-dipping massive interbedded weak claystone, siltstone and sandstone. Bedding planes and joints weaken the rock, which is weak anyway. Narrow zones of crushed rock allow water in. The southern approaches to the new tunnel are largely unstable landslide debris, formed of silty clay with rock fragments.

Towards the end of the construction of the new tunnel, it was feared the old one might collapse. It was shrinking 2-3mm a year when tunnel drainage was working and effective strutting was in place, and 8-10mm per year when it wasn't. The central invert drain had blocked and some steel props were buckling. It was so bad, a contingency plan for reopening the old tunnel in the event of it collapsing, was designed. Fortunately it wasn't needed.

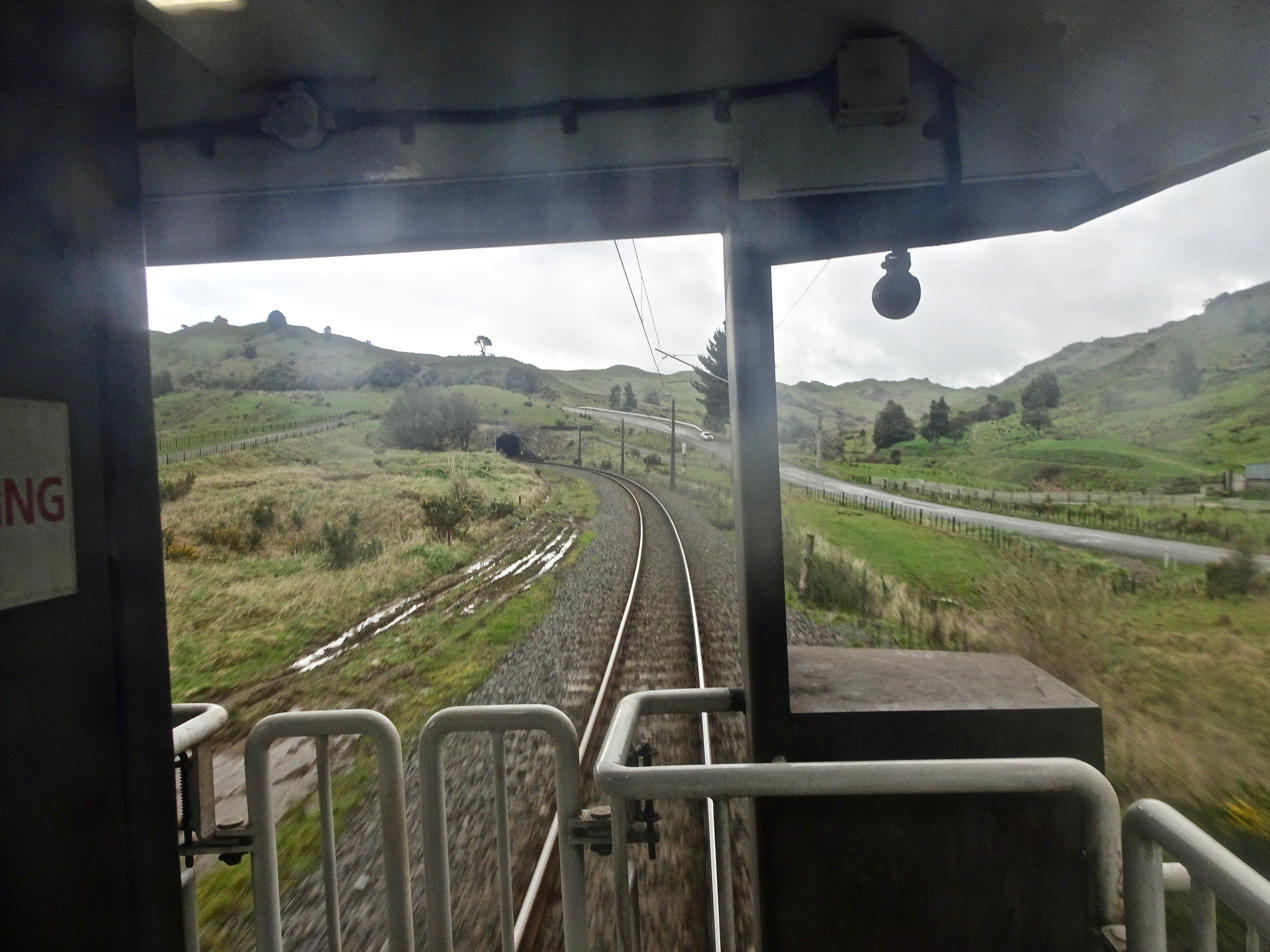
Porootarau Tunnel northern portal and station site (to left) in 2018
