= C. P. Lounsbury =

American entomologist

Charles Pugsley Lounsbury (20 September 1872 Brooklyn - 7 June 1955 Pretoria) was an American-born South African entomologist, widely regarded as having laid the foundations of economic entomology in Southern Africa.

Lounsbury spent his childhood in Boston and later studied at the Massachusetts Agricultural College, where after graduation he stayed on as instructor. In 1893 the Department of Agriculture for the Cape Colony grew concerned about the incidence of phylloxera in the vineyards, and asked for recommendations from L. O. Howard, Head of the Division of Entomology of the U.S. Department of Agriculture, who suggested Lounsbury. When the post was offered to Lounsbury in 1895 at an annual salary of £600, he accepted, married Rose Linda Davis (6 September 1872 - July 1920) who was an assistant in Albany to the New York State Entomologist, and set off for Cape Town shortly before his 23rd birthday.

As soon as he had settled in, Lounsbury requisitioned a bicycle and typewriter - the typewriter was bought with government funds, the bicycle had to be purchased from his own money. He started work from a small office with no secretary or assistant, but on his retirement in 1927 he was Chief of the Division of Entomology of the Union of South Africa with 25 professional entomologists working under him, and a sound international reputation.

By 1896 he had constructed a fumigation chamber using hydrogen cyanide to sterilise imported plants - the first such government installation in the world - and by 1897 the first regulations controlling the importation of plants had been drafted. His first two or three years at the Cape were devoted to plant pest control. By 1898 his interest in ticks as disease vectors had been awakened. His interests also extended to collecting fungi and other cryptogams. Because of the limited space available at his office, Lounsbury was obliged to house his tick host animals in a miscellany of buildings, such as builder's sheds, scattered over Cape Town. Cattle, goats, sheep and dogs were kept without serious objections from neighbours or health authorities. Only in 1903 was a stable to accommodate the animals built some miles out of town.

In 1902 there was an outbreak of what was initially thought to be Redwater in the Transvaal. Arnold Theiler sent specimens of Blue tick (Boophilus decoloratus, now known as Rhipicephalus (Boophilus) decoloratus), known to be the usual vectors for Redwater, taken from infected cattle to Lounsbury in Cape Town. There, surprisingly, they caused no disease when introduced to healthy cattle, leading to the discovery that the disease was not Redwater, but a new protozoan parasite East Coast fever or Theileria parva transmitted by the tick Rhipicephalus appendiculatus.

Biological control was initiated in South Africa at the turn of the century when cottony cushion scale in citrus orchards was brought under control. Originally identified in 1878 in New Zealand, it is now found worldwide in citrus orchards and is controlled by the ladybird beetle Rodolia cardinalis. Another successful program was the virtual eradication of Opuntia vulgaris by the use of cochineal insects in 1913. Control of the Eucalyptus snout beetle followed in 1925 with the introduction of the egg parasite Anaphes nitens, a wasp native to Australia. Integrated pest management saw a swing away from pest eradication to pest control with a goal of minimal harmful side effects, reduced environmental damage, little consumer risk and ecological sustainability.

He was a foundation member of the S. A. Biological Society, and was awarded the S.A. Medal by the South African Association for the Advancement of Science in 1915.

== Publications ==
- Canker Worms, Army Worm, Corn Worm, Red Humped Apple Tree Caterpillar, Antiopa Butterfly, Currant Stem-Girdler, Imported Elm Bark Louse, Greenhouse Orthezia - Charles Pugsley Lounsbury (1895)
- Gas Treatment for Scale Insects (1897) - South Africa Horticultural Board and Charles Pugsley Lounsbury
- European foul brood - Charles Pugsley Lounsbury
- Ticks and the Rhodesian Cattle Disease - Lounsbury (1902 Annual Report)
