= Certificate of pharmaceutical product =

International trade document

The certificate of pharmaceutical product (abbreviated: CPP) is a certificate issued in the format recommended by the World Health Organization (WHO), which establishes the status of the pharmaceutical product and of the applicant for this certificate in the exporting country; it is often mentioned in conjunction with the electronic Common Technical Document (eCTD). A CPP is issued for a single product, because manufacturing arrangements and approved information for different pharmaceutical forms and strengths can vary. The CPP is mentioned in World Trade Organization documents, although the tightly regulated products are subject to bilateral trade agreements or regional trade agreements. The International Council for Harmonisation of Technical Requirements for Pharmaceuticals for Human Use (ICH) has instituted standards for this purpose but it is unclear how the ex-ICH countries operate their health regulators.

== Scope ==
The Certificate of a Pharmaceutical Product is needed by the importing country when the product in question is intended for registration (licensing, authorisation) or renewal (prolongation) of registration, with the scope of commercialisation or distribution in that country. Certification has been recommended by WHO to help undersized drug regulatory authorities or drug regulatory authorities without proper quality assurance facilities in importing countries to assess the quality of pharmaceutical products as prerequisite of registration or importation.

In the presence of such CPP, WHO recommends to national authorities to ensure that analytical methods can be confirmed by the national laboratory, to review and if necessary to adapt product information as per local labelling requirements, and to assess bioequivalence and stability data if necessary.

However, regulatory practices often vary in importing countries. Thus, in addition to CPP, assessment of application dossiers to support drug registrations, with different levels and complexity of requirements are considered necessary to satisfy full assurance on the appropriate quality of drugs.

== Content and format ==
The content of CPP consists of the following main data:

- Exporting (certifying) country
- Importing (requesting) country
- Name, dosage (pharmaceutical) form and composition of the product (active ingredient(s) and amount(s) per unit dose)
- Information on registration (licensing) and marketing (presence on the market) status of the product in the exporting country
- Number of product license (including license holder details, license holder's involvement in manufacturing if any) and date of issue, if applicable
- Appended summary of technical basis on which the product has been licensed (if required by the issuing authority)
- Appended current product information
- Details on the applicant for the CPP
- If marketing authorisation is lacking in the exporting country, information about the reasons for this

When applicable, information as to whether the manufacturing site is periodically inspected by certifying authority and whether the manufacturing site complies with Good Manufacturing Practice (GMP) as recommended by WHO.

Although issuing authorities claim that their CPP conform to WHO format (a statement to confirm whether or not the document is issued in the format recommended by WHO should be included in the certificate), their format and content may vary from one issuing country to another. Also, some authorities do not issue a CPP if the medicinal product concerned is not licensed in the exporting country (e.g. Italy). In this last case, a Certificate of Exportation is issued instead, with a format and content similar to those of a CPP.

In order to avoid disruption of medicinal product availability due to the COVID-19 pandemic, starting with year 2000 stringent regulatory agencies (SRA) implemented the electronic CPP (eCPP). Conceived in the initial stages as a temporary solution in response to the pandemic, eCPP turned gradually into a standard, replacing the paper CPP. In addition to reducing paper waste, another advantage is the faster availability of such documents compared to their hard format.

== Special considerations in importing countries ==
Most competent authorities in importing countries require CPP to be issued by the country of origin.

Also, even though this certificate is released in its original form, addressed to a specific importing country and stamped with the seal of issuing authority on each page, many authorities in importing countries may unnecessarily request authentication of such a document in the form of legalisation by their embassy in the exporting country or by apostillation ("Abuse of scheme"). This practice continues in some importing countries also with the advent of eCPP. Therefore, the issuing SRA strongly recommend verification of eCPP using alternative ways, such as online (e.g., on EMA and FDA websites), using a QR code (FDA), checking of electronic signature validity (EMA) etc.
