= C. P. Rele =

Chandrashekhar Rele
- Birth name: Chandrashekhar P. Rele
- Origin: Mumbai, India
- Genres: Indian Classical, Hindustani
- Occupation(s): Singer, composer, musicologist, author

C.P. Rele (c. 1928 – 16 April 2010) was a Hindustani classical musician who specialized in singing, teaching, and composing khyal.

Rele witnessed, at very close quarters, the training and the growth of Kumar Gandharva, and was widely considered an authority on Kumar Gandharva's musical style. More about his long musical association and friendship with Kumar Gandharva can be found in his book, Kumar Maajhaa Sakhaa.

Apart from Kumar Maajhaa Sakhaa and Gunjan, Rele was the author of a work on raga Sangeet, entitled Svara Pravaaha, a reference text for students, musicians and scholars, that enhances learning and teaching of raga sangeet at music institutions and university departments. This text was published by the Samvaad Foundation.
