= International Grooving & Grinding Association =

Trade association and surface industry

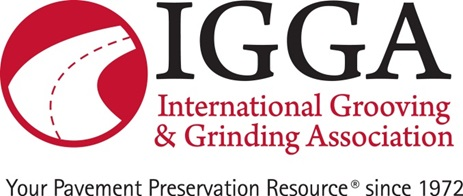
- Industry: Grooving, grinding, concrete pavement restoration and concrete pavement preservation
- Founded: 1972
- Headquarters: Coxsackie, NY, U.S.
- Number of employees: John Roberts, Executive Director; Michele Rivenburg, Office Manager; Dan Frentress, Consultant Promoter
- Website: www.igga.net

International Grooving & Grinding Association (IGGA) is a non-profit trade association located in West Coxsackie, New York. Founded in 1972, the organization represents the grooving, grinding, and Concrete Pavement Restoration (CPR) and Concrete Pavement Preservation (CPP) industry. The organization became an affiliate of the American Concrete Pavement Association (ACPA) in 1995.

The IGGA is made up of contractors, manufacturers, suppliers, consultants and public officials representing the industry. In addition to a diversified Board of Directors, the IGGA is served by a Communications Committee whose activities include public relations, development of marketing materials and industry promotion. The Environmental Committee is in place to research and educate the industry about key issues affecting the marketplace.

== History ==
The IGGA was first incorporated in Lakewood, California, in June 1972. In 1995, the IGGA affiliated with the American Concrete Pavement Association (ACPA) to represent its newly formed CPR Division, to serve as a technical resource and industry representative in the marketing of grooving, grinding, and CPR/CPP to Departments of Transportation, municipalities, and engineers worldwide.

== Awards ==
The IGGA has an annual awards competition to honor individuals and organizations for contributions made to the grooving, grinding, and concrete pavement restoration industry. The awards are:

- The Lester F. Kuzmick Award recognizes individuals, companies, and organizations for excellence in the industry, named in honor of Lester Kuzmick, a former IGGA leader.
- The Operator of the Year ("Iron Man") is a leadership award with special emphasis on dedication to quality.
- The Government Official of the Year Award, for leadership in transportation activities with an emphasis on grooving, grinding, and CPR.
- The Honorary Life Member Award is for retired or retiring professionals who have rendered outstanding service to the industry and the IGGA.
