= Basis set superposition error =

Error in quantum-chemistry calculations due to overlapping basis sets

In quantum chemistry, calculations using finite basis sets are susceptible to basis set superposition error (BSSE). As the atoms of interacting molecules (or of different parts of the same molecule - intramolecular BSSE) approach one another, their basis functions overlap. Each monomer "borrows" functions from other nearby components, effectively increasing its basis set and improving the calculation of derived properties such as energy. If the total energy is minimised as a function of the system geometry, the short-range energies from the mixed basis sets must be compared with the long-range energies from the unmixed sets, and this mismatch introduces an error.

Other than using infinite basis sets, two methods exist to eliminate the BSSE. In the chemical Hamiltonian approach (CHA), basis set mixing is prevented a priori, by replacing the conventional Hamiltonian with one in which all the projector-containing terms that would allow mixing have been removed. In the counterpoise method (CP), the BSSE is calculated by re-performing all the calculations using the mixed basis sets, and the error is then subtracted a posteriori from the uncorrected energy. (The mixed basis sets are realised by introducing "ghost orbitals", basis set functions which have no electrons or protons. It however has been shown that there is an inherent danger in using counterpoise corrected energy surfaces, due to the inconsistent effect of the correction in different areas of the energy surface.) Though conceptually very different, the two methods tend to give similar results. It also has been shown that the error is often larger when using the CP method since the central atoms in the system have much greater freedom to mix with all of the available functions compared to the outer atoms. Whereas in the CHA model, those orbitals have no greater intrinsic freedom and therefore the correction treats all fragments equally. The errors inherent in either BSSE correction disappear more rapidly than the total value of BSSE in larger basis sets.

== See also ==
- Basis set (chemistry) – Set of functions used to represent the electronic wave function
- Quantum chemistry – Chemistry based on quantum physics
- Quantum chemistry computer programs
