= Timber Trail =

New Zealand cycling and tramping trail

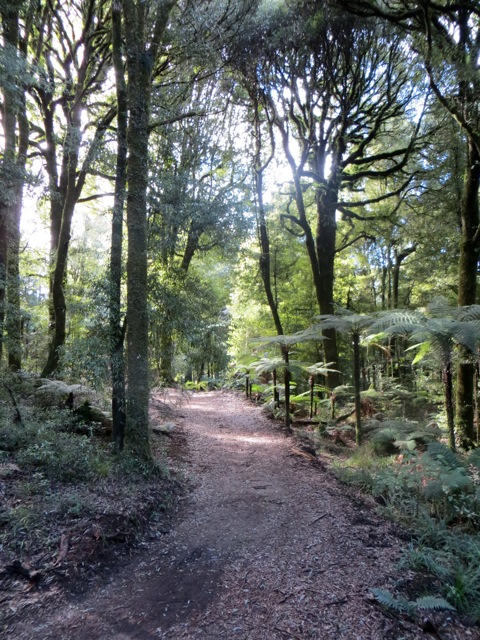
- Above the Piropiro Valley; typical of the northern section of the Timber Trail
- Length: 84 km (52 mi)
- Location: border of Waikato region and Manawatu-Wanganui region, New Zealand
- Trailheads: Pureora and Ongarue
- Use: Walking, cycling
- Elevation change: 360 m (1,180 ft)
- Highest point: 940 m (3,080 ft)
- Lowest point: 200 m (660 ft)
- Difficulty: Intermediate to easy
- Season: Year round
- Sights: Suspension bridges, railway spiral, native bush
- Hazards: mud, trees, storms

The Timber Trail, originally known as the Central North Island Rail Trail or Pureora Timber Trail, in the North Island of New Zealand is an 84-kilometre (52 mi) cycleway (also used by walkers and hunters) in Pureora Forest Park, fully opened in 2013, with 35 bridges (built by DoC staff, community max workers, or contractors), including eight large suspension bridges (one of the longest on a New Zealand cycleway, much more stable than the swing bridges used on older tracks). It is one of several cycleways developed as part of the New Zealand Cycle Trail and passes through some of the last remaining podocarp forests of rimu, tōtara, miro, mataī and kahikatea, as well as some exotic forestry and regenerating bush. About half the trail is on the track-bed of the old Ellis and Burnand Tramway, including a spiral and tunnel.

It is easier to start the Timber Trail from Pureora (Northern end of the Timber Trail) to Ongarue. Although there is a hill climb up to Mt Pureora in this direction. Fit riders can cover the trail in a day.

There are three main access points to the Timber Trail:

- North – Pureora Village, signposted from SH30 between Te Kūiti and Mangakino.
- Centre – from Piropiro campsite at the end of Kokomiko Rd, Waimiha.
- South – Ongarue, signposted from SH4.

== Northern section ==
Pureora to Piropiro (39.5 km) Track category: Intermediate/Grade 3

0–8 km Easy/Grade 2 Pureroa DoC Centre to the first shelter.

The trail begins in Pikiariki Ecological Area, about 200 metres (660 ft) from the DOC Pureora Field Base on Barryville Rd, turning left a few metres into the bush, on a boardwalk, then winding some 4 kilometres (2.5 mi) through tall podocarps (frequented by kākā), over Whareana Stream, through a Douglas fir plantation, across Whareana Road and Cabbage Tree Rd before winding up through an area of regenerating toitoi, cabbage tree, five finger and kāmahi. It crosses Tui Rd, to the shelter below Mt Pureora.

8–23 km — Mt Pureora to Angel's Rest grade 3 (intermediate)

The trail winds to 940 metres (3,080 ft), within a 40-minute walk of the 1,165-metre (3,822 ft) Mt Pureora summit, through various stages of regenerating bush to the existing native bush edge to the top of the Ongarue River and an old logging road.

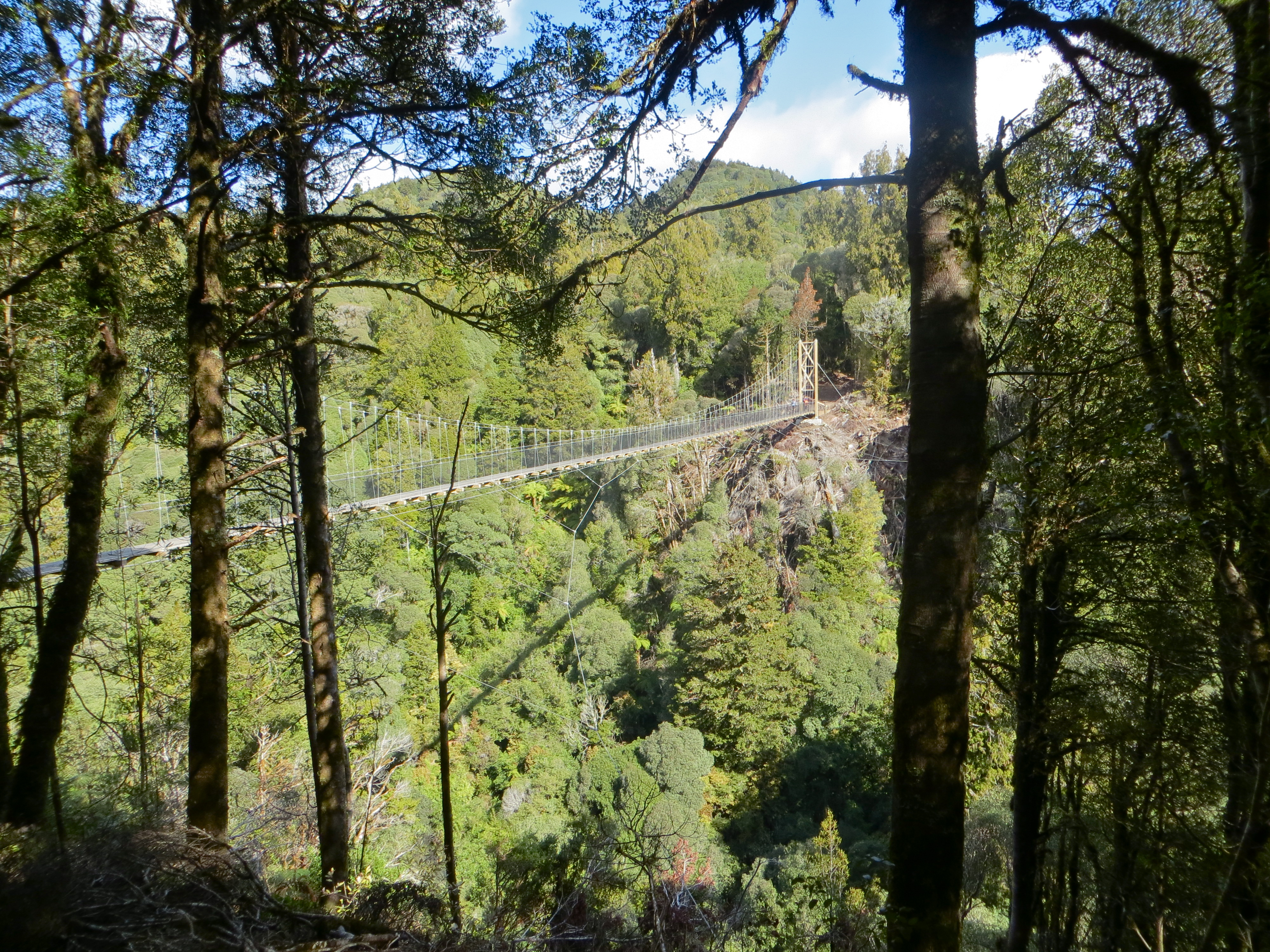
115-metre (377 ft) Bog Creek bridge

Two large suspension bridges cross tributaries of the river at Bog Inn Creek (115 metres or 377 feet) and the similar sized Orauhora crossing.

23–40 km — Angel’s Rest – Okauaka Ford – Maramataha River

Uses a logging road for some 6 kilometres (3.7 mi), then mainly Okauaka Road. 500 metres (1,600 ft) beyond the concrete ford and neighbouring trail bridge over Okauaka Stream, the track joins a tramway, crosses Okauaka Road again, and continues through the bush to Kokomiko Road and Piropiro campground. After the campground, the track rejoins the tramway to Maramataha Rodd, then follows Piropiro Stream on a new track to the Maramataha Bridge.

== Southern section ==
(Easy/Grade 2) 43 km Piropiro to Ongarue

40–52 km – Piropiro to Angels Rest Intermediate/Grade 3

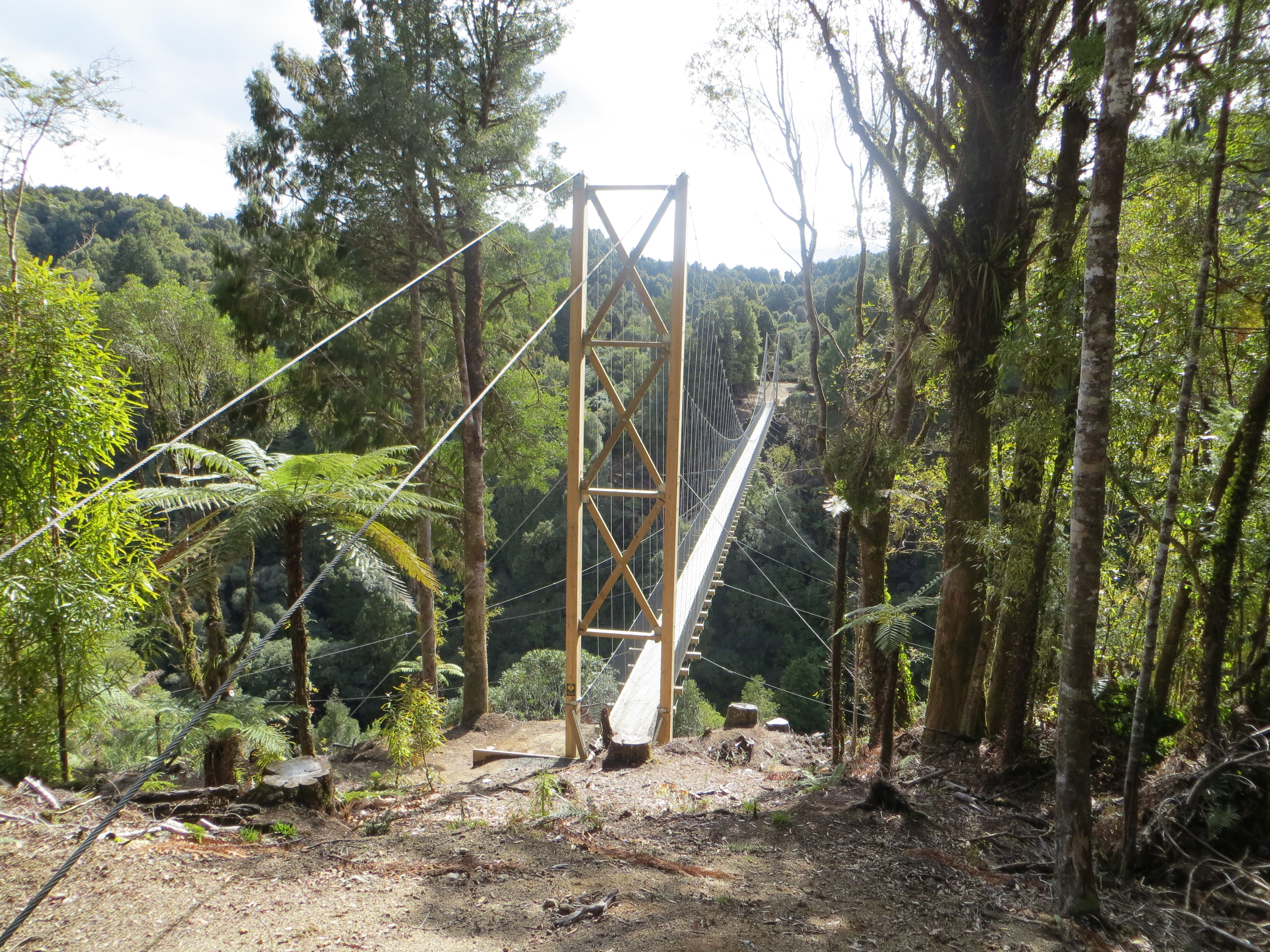
141-metre (463 ft) Maramataha Bridge over the Maramataha River

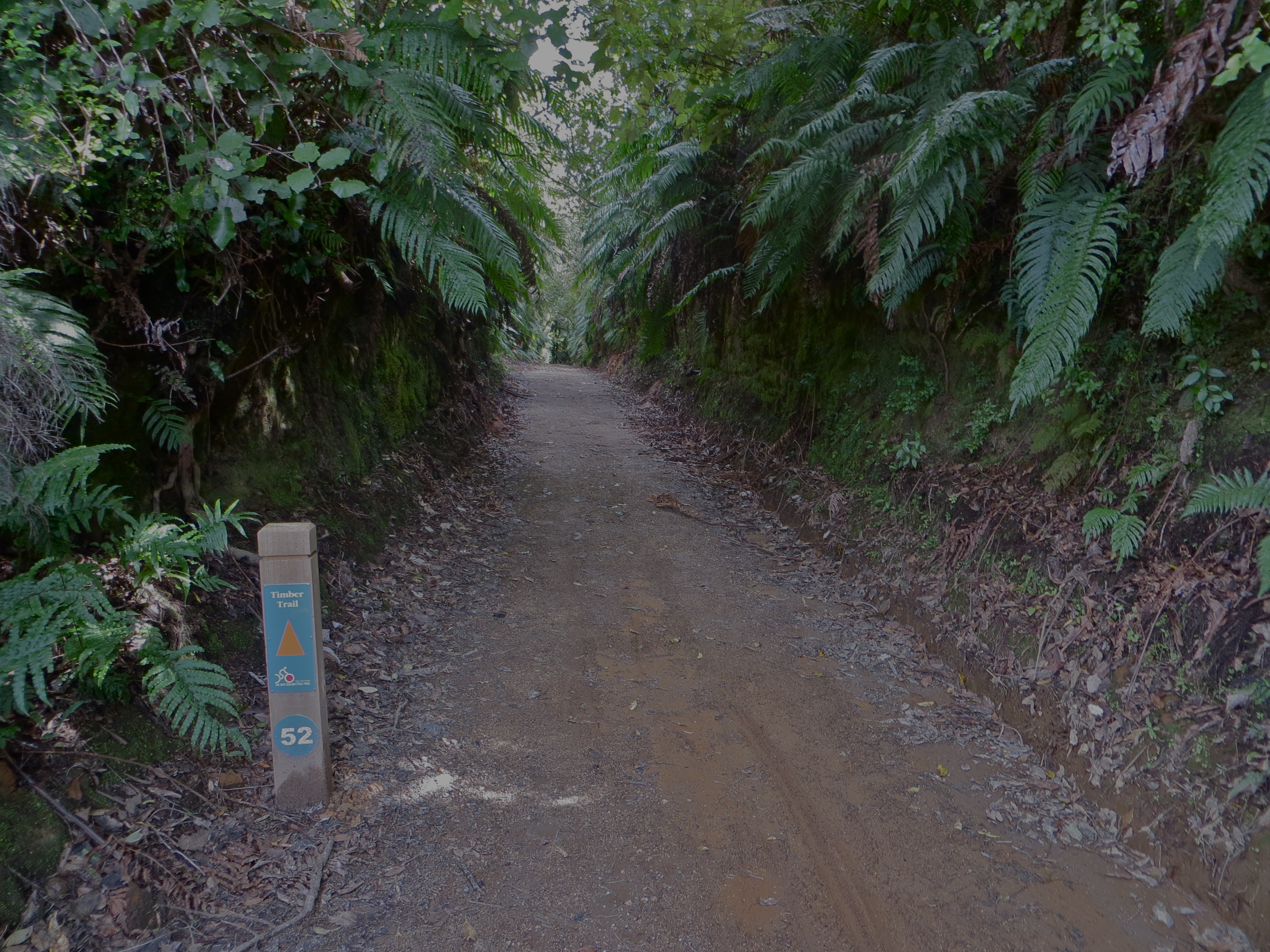
Kilometre post 52 – each kilometre is marked

A 30-minute climb from the Piropiro campsite leads to the 141-metre (463 ft) Maramataha Bridge, some 60 metres (200 ft) above the Maramataha Gorge and the largest suspension bridge of its kind along any cycle trail in New Zealand. Construction required much rock drilling and anchor work. It is supported on 12.8-metre (42 ft) high glulam towers.

52–64 km — Maramataha River – Deer Park junction – Waione Stream

South of the bridge the steepest climb on the trail zigzags to a plateau on a new track. From the plateau quad tracks lead to the north end of the Ellis and Burnand Tramway, Ongarue tramway, which the trail then mostly follows on easier gradients to Ongarue. These tramways were cleared in 2011.

64–74 km — Waione Stream – Waikoura Stream – Goat Creek

A 40-metre (130 ft) suspension bridge crosses Waione Stream, then the tramway runs to Waikoura Stream, passing No. 11 and No. 10 camps, and the No. 9 tramway junction. The information board says Waikoura Camp at No. 9 was the largest and last camp on this tramway, built in 1950 and closed in 1963, with 6 houses and 9 single men's huts. A 28-metre (92 ft) suspension bridge crosses Waikoura Stream and a tramway links to the 90-metre (300 ft) Mangatukutuku suspension bridge, then No. 7 tramway runs to Goat Creek.

74–83 km — Goat Creek – Ongarue Spiral – Mangakahu Rd

A three span, curved, timber trestle bridge crosses Goat Creek, resembling many of the tramway bridges, then 4 kilometres (2.5 mi) of tramway cleared in 2011 leads to the spiral.

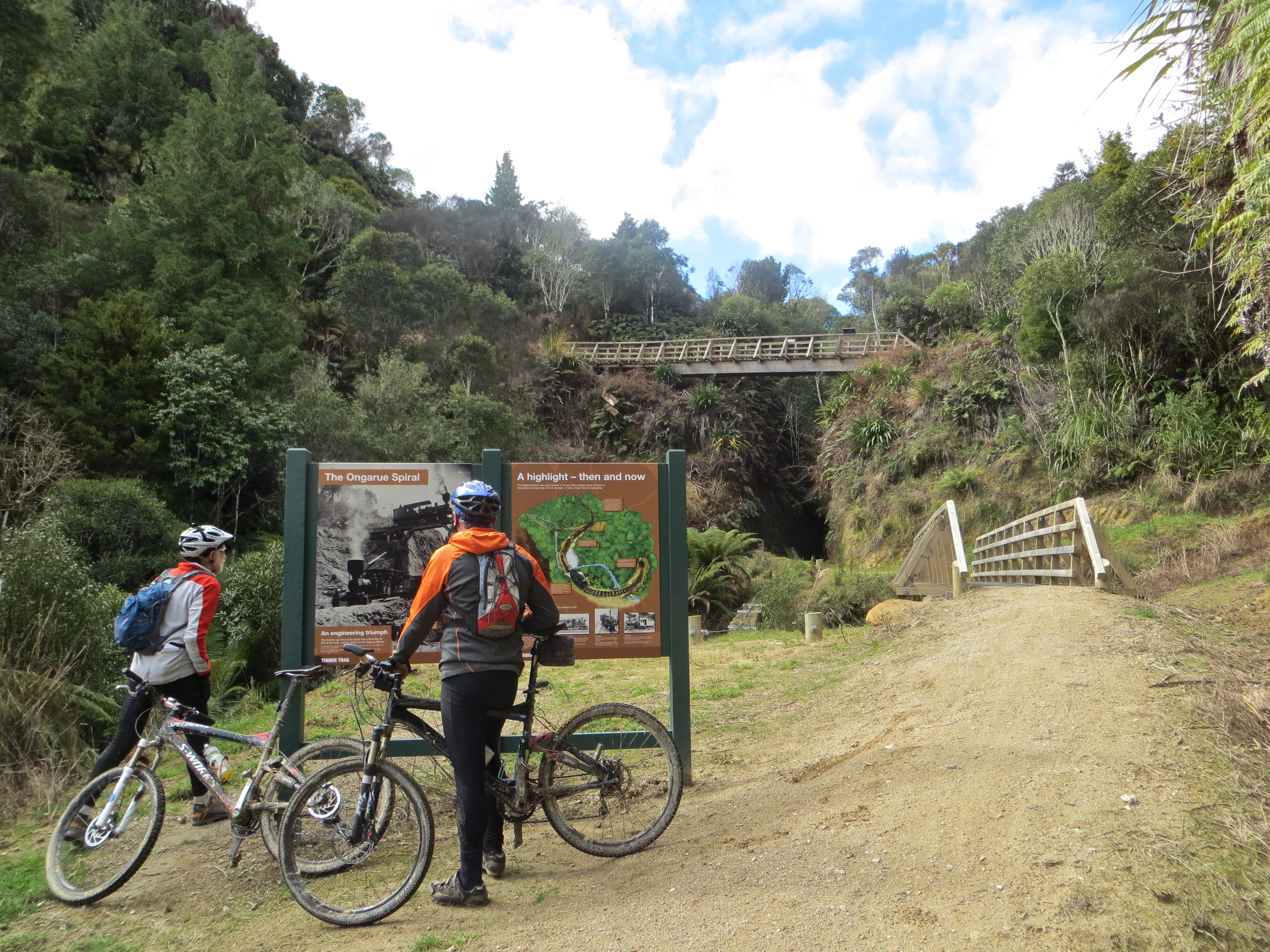
Ellis and Burnand tramway climbed 43 metres (141 ft) here

The Ongarue Spiral took the tramway up 43 metres (141 ft) on a grade the bush lokeys could cope with (for 6 kilometres or 3.7 miles the gradient averaged 1 in 30). Below the spiral the tramway was built by cutting a ledge in the ignimbrite cliffs. It continues to drop until reaching the bank of the Mangakahu Stream. The final 4 kilometres (2.5 mi) are undulating to the end of the trail in a car park beside Mangakahu Road, 2 kilometres (1.2 mi) from Ongarue.

== History ==
The Timber Trail, originally known as the Central North Island Rail Trail, cost about $5.5m to build. It was one of the seven 'Quick Start' Projects announced in 2009, which were publicised as promoting economic growth The Timber Trail took longer to complete than some later projects, so it was the tenth New Zealand Cycle Trail to be completed since Prime Minister John Key had launched the cycleways with the Green Party.

By mid-2011 only 23 kilometres (14 mi) was open, with tenders still not let for interpretation panels and five bridges. It was then that the contract with the Ministry of Economic Development for community max and taskforce green workers ended. 12 staff had been trained in 12 months in basic woodwork, track construction, quad bike and 4WD driving and health and safety. DoC employed five from the MED scheme for six months to build 6 to 10 metres (20 to 33 ft) bridges, shelters, other structures, and some track construction. Another went on 'community max' with the recreation team.

Ongarue Spiral restoration work began in July 2011. The tunnel was strengthened and the stream re-diverted out of it (it had been diverted in when the tramway was replaced by logging trucks). The tunnel ceiling was reinforced with mesh, a lower bridge built to the right of the original bridge to preserve bits of the original and remnants of the upper bridge preserved in the new trail bridge.

Negotiations were held to build a 30-metre (98 ft) suspension bridge over Mangakahu Stream to end the trail further east on Mangakahu Rd, but the trail as built has another 4 kilometres (2.5 mi) of undulating ride keeping north of the stream, roughly following the tramway (see map below) to within 2 kilometres (1.2 mi) of Ongarue.

In July 2011 Maramataha, Waione, and Waikoura bridges were tested to their 10-person weight limit using water weights to get council consent and 1.6 kilometres (0.99 mi) of track was built (though not surfaced). Maramataha Bridge was finished in early October 2012 and opened on 1 November 2012. The northern end Bog Creek and Orauhora suspension bridges were ready by December 2012.

On 1 December 2012 southern section opening day 150 cyclists rode its four suspension bridges, the tramline, and Ongarue Spiral.

The Timber Trail was declared fully open when the Minister of Conservation cut the ribbon on Saturday, 30 March 2013.

After the opening improvements and maintenance continued; in winter 2013 additional pumice was helicoptered to boggy patches on the Mt Pureora section. Other changes are likely. For example, there were concession negotiations about lodgings at Piropiro Flats to supplement the existing campground, where stumps had been cleared.

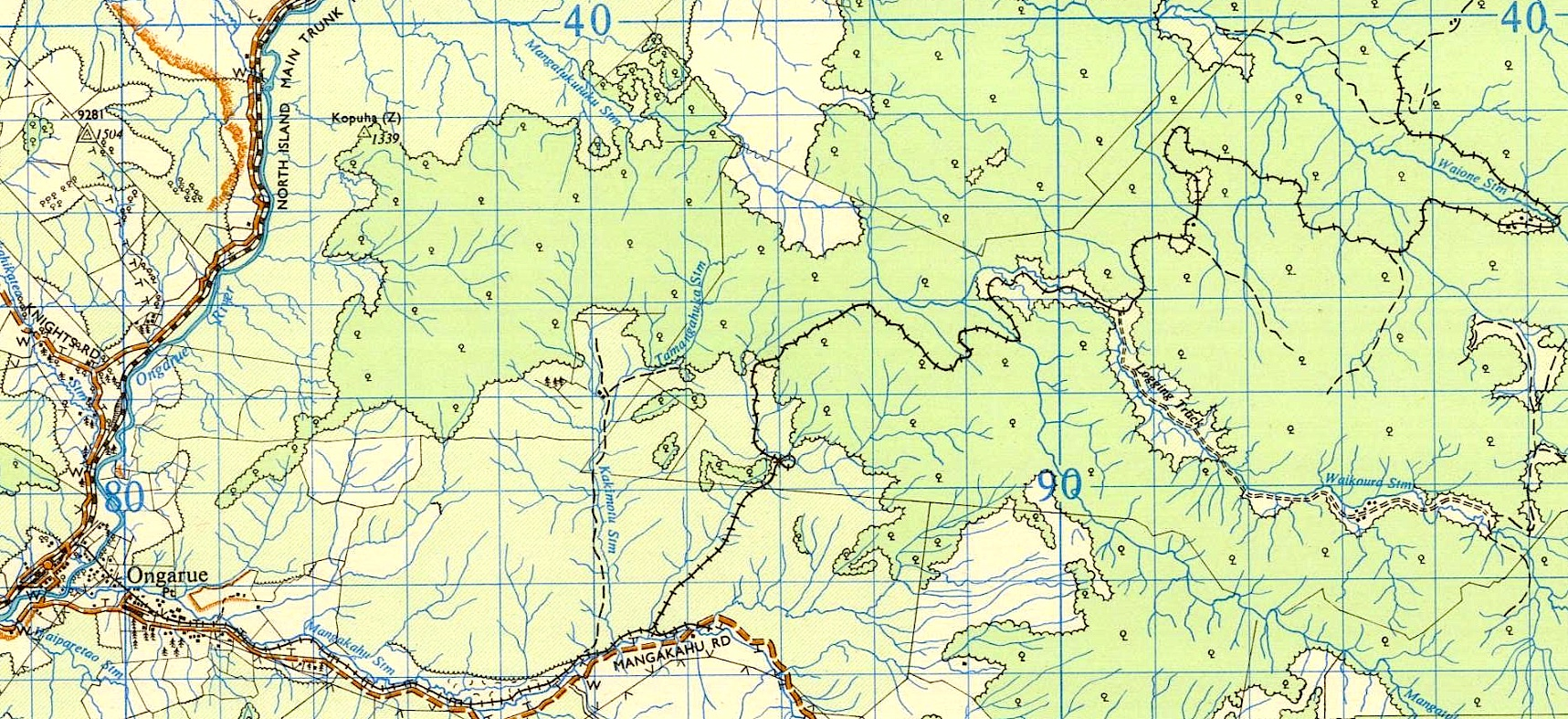
Ellis and Burnand Ongarue tramway, now the southern end of the Timber Trail. Sourced from 1956 1" map sheet N92. Crown Copyright Reserved.

Most of the Timber Trail's southern section follows the tramway built by J. W. Ellis and Harry Burnand. Their timber sawmill at Ongarue was fed with logs (especially rimu) by a gradually growing network of tramways from 1903 until floods damaged the lines in 1958. From then until closure in 1966 the tramway was converted for use by logging trucks. However, as one of the best preserved bush tramways, it is considered a nationally significant site.

== Economic development ==
One of the purposes of the cycle trails was to encourage economic development in remote rural areas.

== See also ==
- Bush Tramway Club
- Ellis and Burnand
- New Zealand Cycle Trail
- Rail trail
