= Harry Burnand =

New Zealand engineer and sawmiller

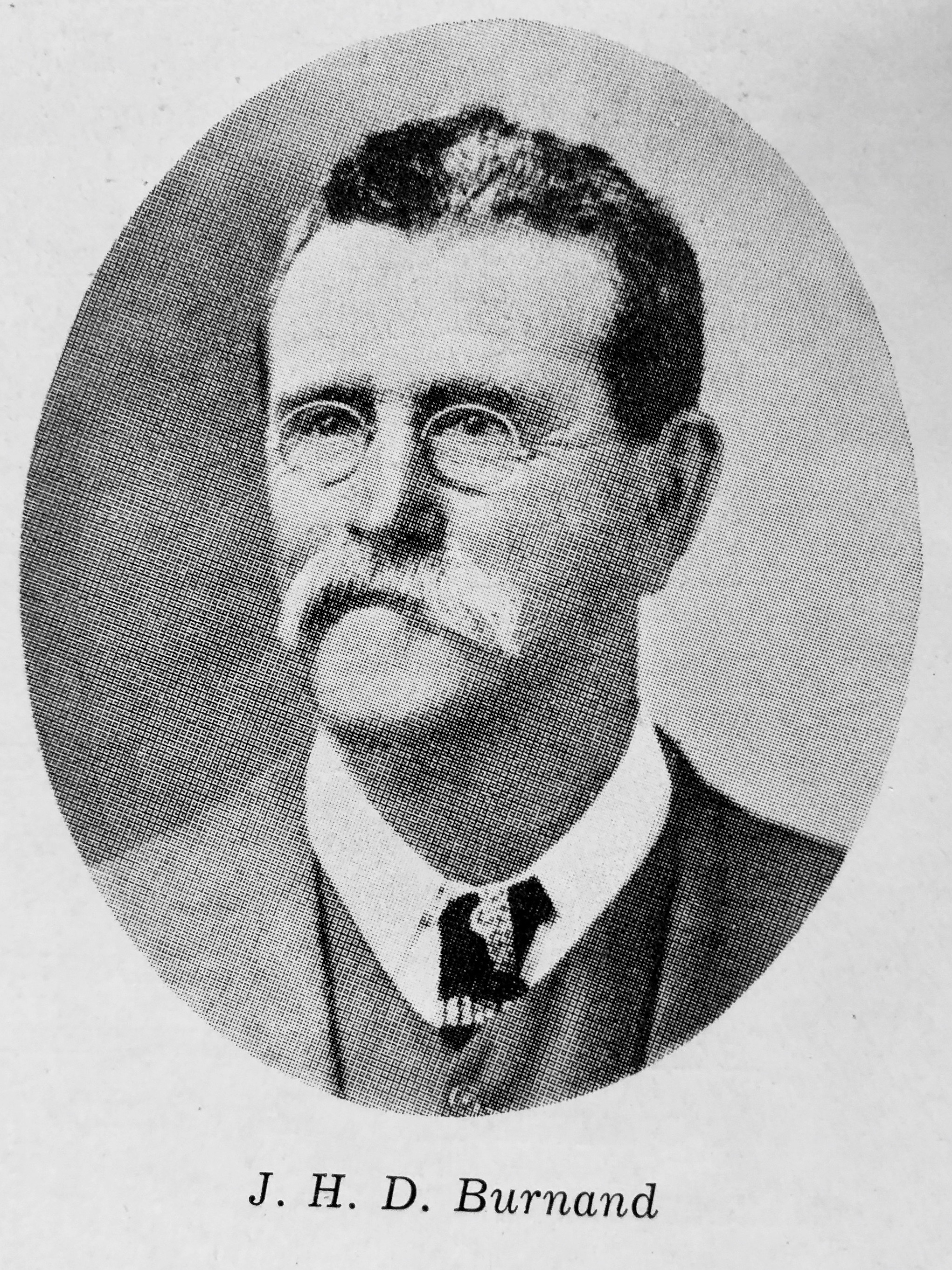

John Henry Davis Burnand (2 December 1850 – 25 March 1919), known as Harry Burnand, was a New Zealand engineer and sawmiller. He was born in London, England on 2 December 1850.

He was an engineer at Poro-o-tarao tunnel from 1887.

He was a director of Ellis and Burnand from 1903, formed with John William Ellis, which was initially based in Ōtorohanga. The company had sawmills and logging railways, such as the Ellis and Burnand Tramway, Ongarue, in many surrounding areas. It later became part of the company now trading as PlaceMakers.

His younger son, Harry, was killed in France in 1917 during the First World War.

He died suddenly at Mangapehi and is buried in Taumarunui Cemetery. He had been suffering from heart problems. An obituary said he was 65 years old.
