= Ellis and Burnand Tramway =

Bush tramway in New Zealand, 1922 to 1958

Coordinates: 38.70691°S 175.36502°E

Ellis & Burnand Tramway
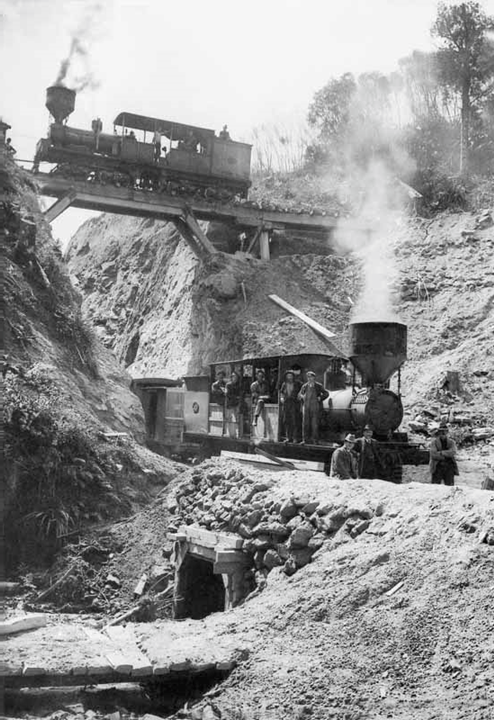
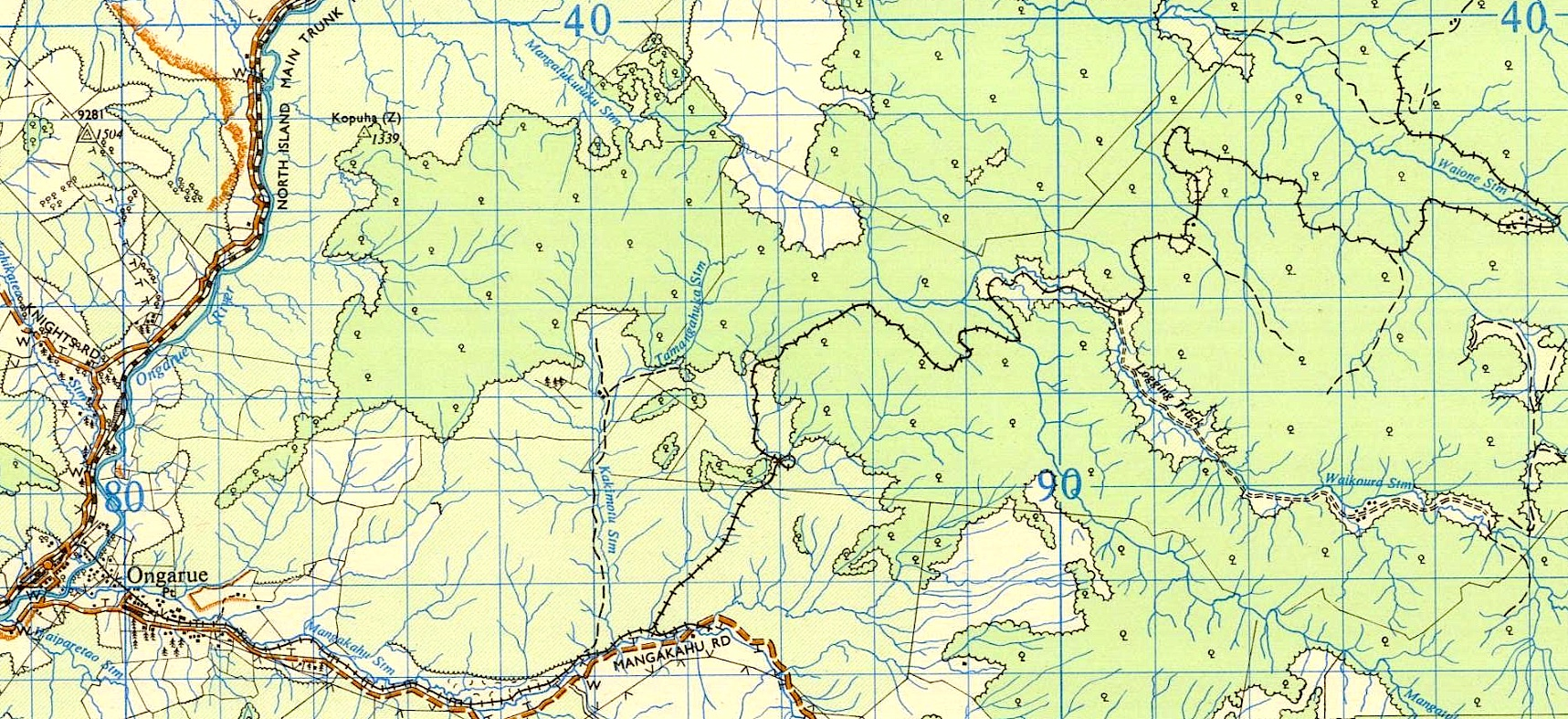
- Two A & G Price locomotives on the spiral Route

Technical
- Line length: 37 kilometres (23 mi)
- Track gauge: 3 ft 6 in (1,067 mm)

The Ellis & Burnand Tramway was from 1922 to 1958 a 37 kilometres (23 mi) long bush tramway near Ongarue in the central North Island of New Zealand with a gauge of 3 ft 6 in (1,067 mm).

== Route ==
The construction of the rail track started in 1922, after J. W. Ellis and Harry Burnand had built their timber mill at Ongarue in 1914.

The Ellis & Burnand Tramway was well engineered with a spiral, a tunnel, two great trestle bridges and very impressive cuttings.

In 1955 the tramway was closed because of flood damage, followed by the mill closure in 1966.

== Locomotives ==
Geared steam locomotives Climax, Heisler/Stearns and A & G Price were used on the tramway. The Climax operated between the mill and the Waione camp siding while the A & G Price ran from there to the bush loading points.

Wheels	Type	Manufacturer	Number	Year	Condition	Owner	Usage
0-4-4-0BT		Climax Manufacturing Co.	#1650	1924	Stored	Bush Tramway Club	1924-1960
0-4-4-0BT		Heisler/Stearns	#1082	1904	Overhaul	Bush Tramway Club	1947-1966
0-4-4-4-4-0T		A & G Price	Matilda	1912	Out of service		1923-1951
0-4-4-4-4-0T		A & G Price	Martha	1912	Out of service		1923-1926
0-4-4-0BT	B	Climax Manufacturing Co.	#1203	1913	Stored	West Coast Historical & Me- chanical Society, Shantytown	1953-1963
0-4-4-0T	E	A & G Price	#111	1923	Overhaul	Bush Tramway Club	1944-1958
4-2-0		Chevrolet			Unknown		

== Timber trail ==
The right of way of the tramway is now being used as the Timber Trail, which can be used on foot or bike.

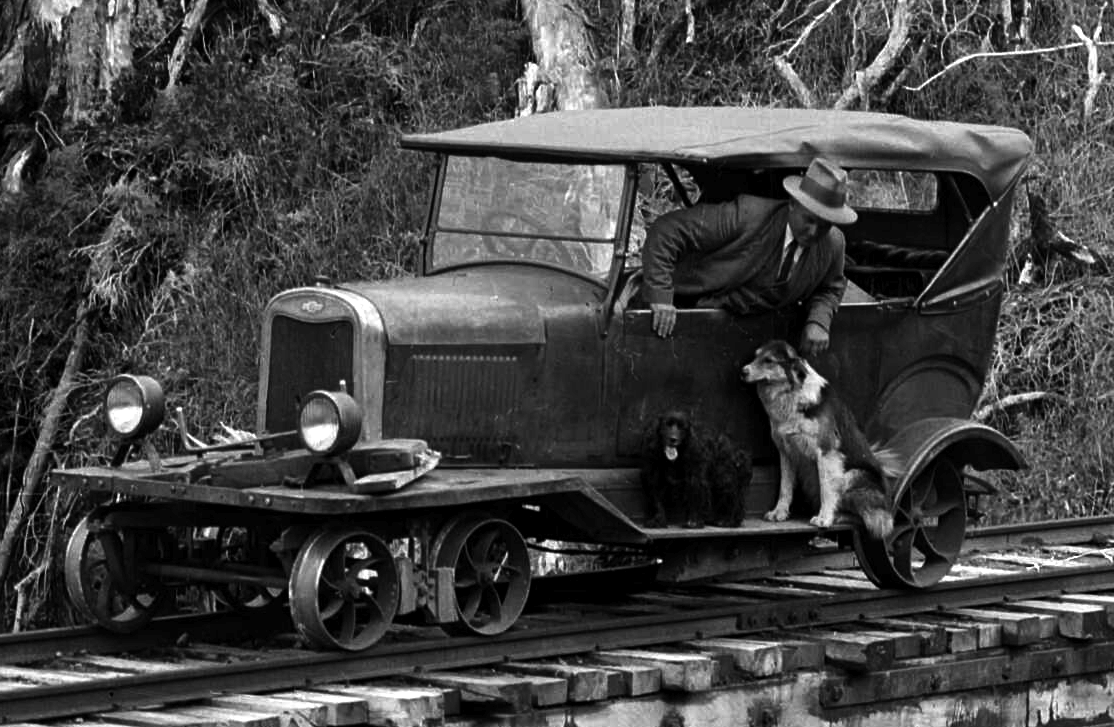
Managers' Chevrolet jigger on a bridge over a gorge near the mill

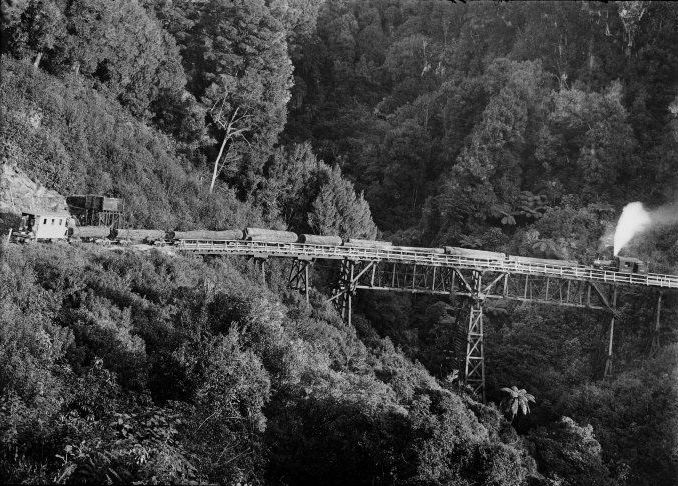
Climax locomotive hauling logs over the Mangatukutuku Viaduct

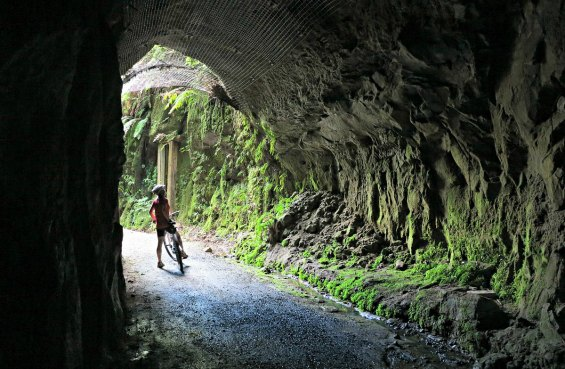
Today's timber trail in the curved tunnel of the Ongarue Spiral

== See also ==
- Rail trail
