= Ongarue =

Rual community in the Manawatū-Whanganui region of New Zealand

- Rural community
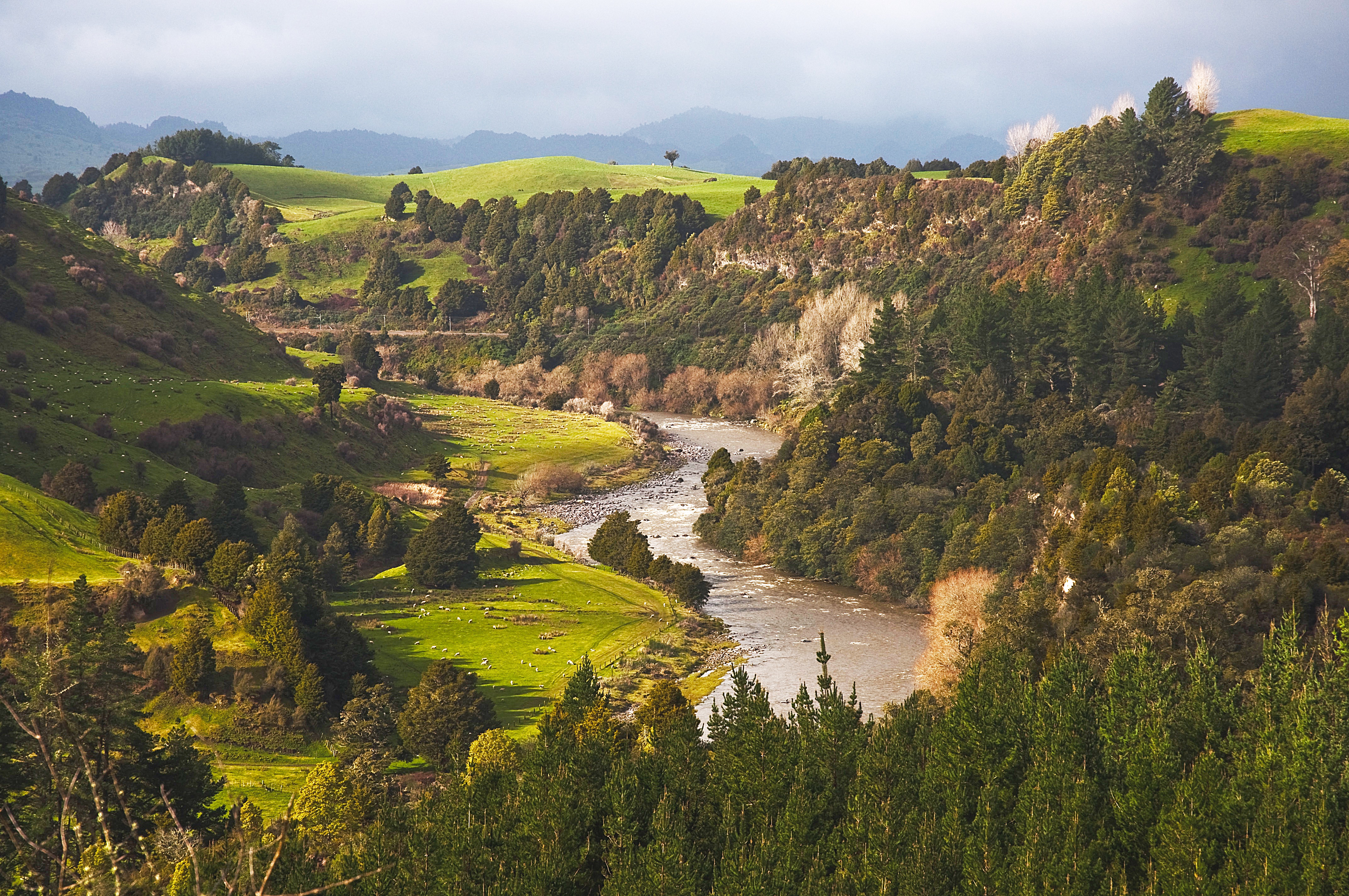
- Ongarue valley
- Interactive map of Ongarue
- Coordinates: 38.716°S 175.284°E
- Country: New Zealand
- Region: Manawatū-Whanganui
- District: Ruapehu District
- Ward: Ruapehu General Ward; Ruapehu Māori Ward
- Community: Taumarunui-Ōhura Community
- Electorates: Taranaki-King Country; Te Tai Hauāuru (Māori)

Government
  - Territorial Authority: Ruapehu District Council
  - Regional council: Horizons Regional Council
  - Mayor of Ruapehu: Weston Kirton
  - Taranaki-King Country MP: Barbara Kuriger
  - Te Tai Hauāuru MP: Debbie Ngarewa-Packer

Area
  - Total: 138.62 km^{2} (53.52 sq mi)

Population (2023 Census)
  - Total: 120
  - Density: 0.87/km^{2} (2.2/sq mi)

Ongarue (Māori: Ōngarue) is a rural community in the Ruapehu District and Manawatū-Whanganui region of New Zealand's North Island. It is located south of Te Kūiti and Waimiha, and north of Taumarunui.

The New Zealand Ministry for Culture and Heritage gives a translation of "place of shaking" (i.e. an earthquake) for Ōngarue.

Ongarue is on the North Island Main Trunk Railway. The Ongarue railway station operated from 1901 to 1975. On 6 July 1923, south of the township, an express train hit a landslide; the resulting Ongarue railway disaster killed 17 people, at the time the worst loss of life on New Zealand's railway. It remains the country's third-worst railway disaster.

The village formerly had an Ellis and Burnand sawmill. From 1922 to 1958, the Ellis and Burnand Tramway, an extensive bush tramway, served this mill and connected with the Main Trunk railway. Much of the tramway's alignment is now the Timber Trail cycleway; Ongarue is at the lower end of the route.

== Demographics ==
Ongarue locality covers 138.62 km^{2} (53.52 sq mi). The locality is part of the larger Otangiwai-Ohura statistical area.

Historical population
Year	Pop.	±% p.a.
2006	132	—
2013	126	−0.66%
2018	135	+1.39%
2023	120	−2.33%

Ongarue had a population of 120 in the 2023 New Zealand census, a decrease of 15 people (−11.1%) since the 2018 census, and a decrease of 6 people (−4.8%) since the 2013 census. There were 66 males and 51 females in 51 dwellings. The median age was 47.5 years (compared with 38.1 years nationally). There were 21 people (17.5%) aged under 15 years, 27 (22.5%) aged 15 to 29, 48 (40.0%) aged 30 to 64, and 24 (20.0%) aged 65 or older.

People could identify as more than one ethnicity. The results were 75.0% European (Pākehā), 37.5% Māori, and 10.0% other, which includes people giving their ethnicity as "New Zealander". English was spoken by 95.0%, Māori by 15.0%, and other languages by 2.5%. The percentage of people born overseas was 7.5, compared with 28.8% nationally.

Religious affiliations were 25.0% Christian, 7.5% Māori religious beliefs, and 2.5% New Age. People who answered that they had no religion were 47.5%, and 20.0% of people did not answer the census question.

Of those at least 15 years old, 9 (9.1%) people had a bachelor's or higher degree, 66 (66.7%) had a post-high school certificate or diploma, and 24 (24.2%) people exclusively held high school qualifications. The median income was $32,900, compared with $41,500 nationally. 3 people (3.0%) earned over $100,000 compared to 12.1% nationally. The employment status of those at least 15 was 54 (54.5%) full-time, 18 (18.2%) part-time, and 6 (6.1%) unemployed.

== Marae ==
The area has two local marae:

- Te Kōura Marae and Te Karohirohi meeting house is affiliated with the Ngāti Maniapoto hapū of Pahere, and with Te Āwhitu.
- Te Rongaroa Marae and Ko Uehaeroa meeting house are affiliated with the Ngāti Maniapoto hapū of Raerae and Rōrā.

== Education ==
Ongarue School is a co-educational state primary school for Year 1 to 8 students, with a roll of 16 as of July 2026. It opened in 1902.
