= Ellis and Burnand =

Ellis and Burnand Limited
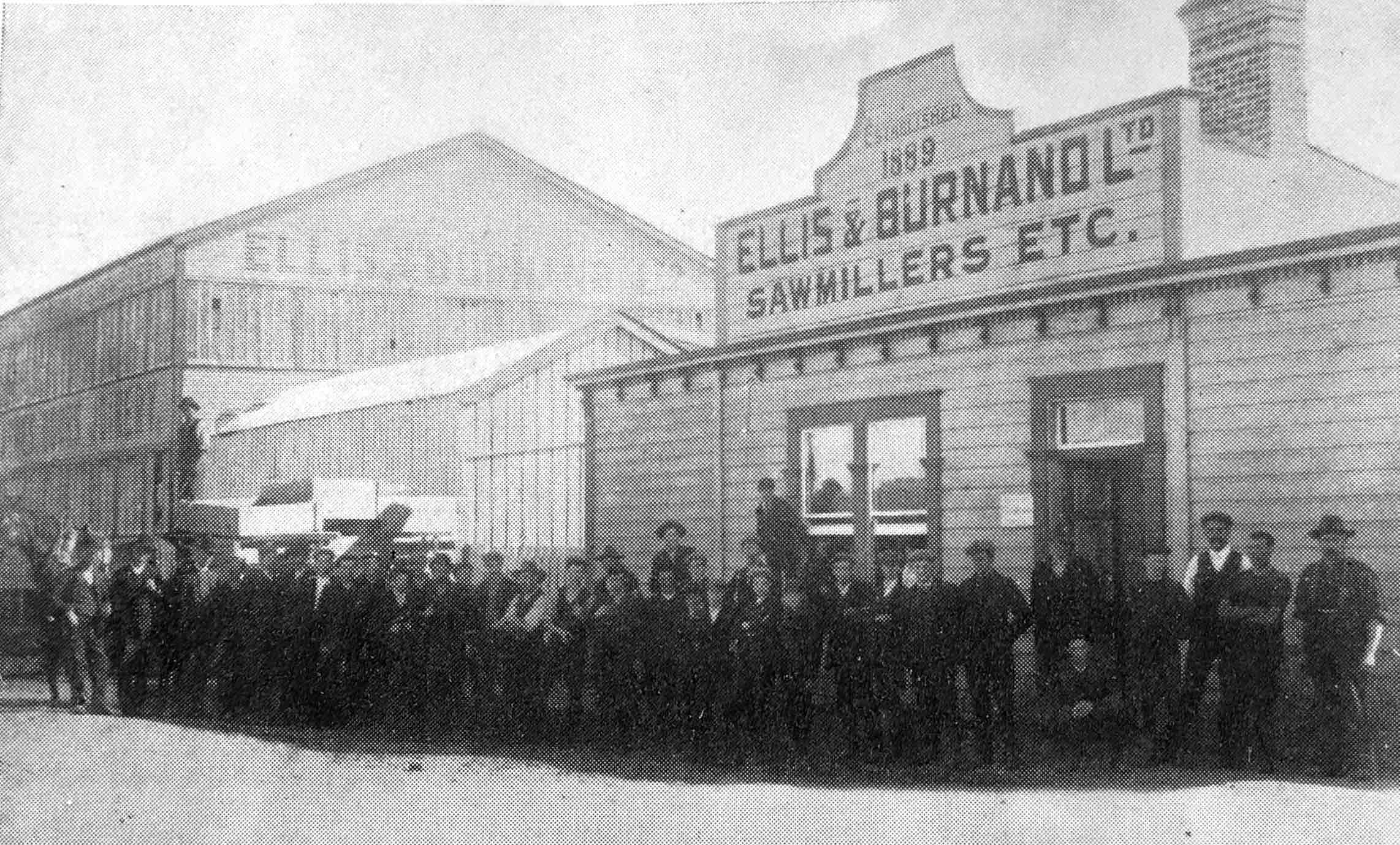
- 1905 head office on Bryce St, Hamilton
- Founded: 1890
- Founder: J. W. Ellis and J. H. D. Burnand
- Defunct: 1980
- Headquarters: Hamilton, New Zealand
- Number of employees: (4,000 (1923))

Ellis and Burnand was a New Zealand sawmilling and timber retailing company, formed by businessman John William Ellis and engineer Harry Burnand in 1891.

Ellis and Burnand Ltd was incorporated in 1903. They were responsible for felling much of the native bush in the southern Waikato and northern Manawatu-Whanganui regions. Their operations expanded initially to supply the timber needs of the North Island Main Trunk railway as it was extended south. Once the railway opened, new mills were built to exploit previously hard to access areas.

Fletcher Holdings bought the company in 1990, rebranding it as PlaceMakers.

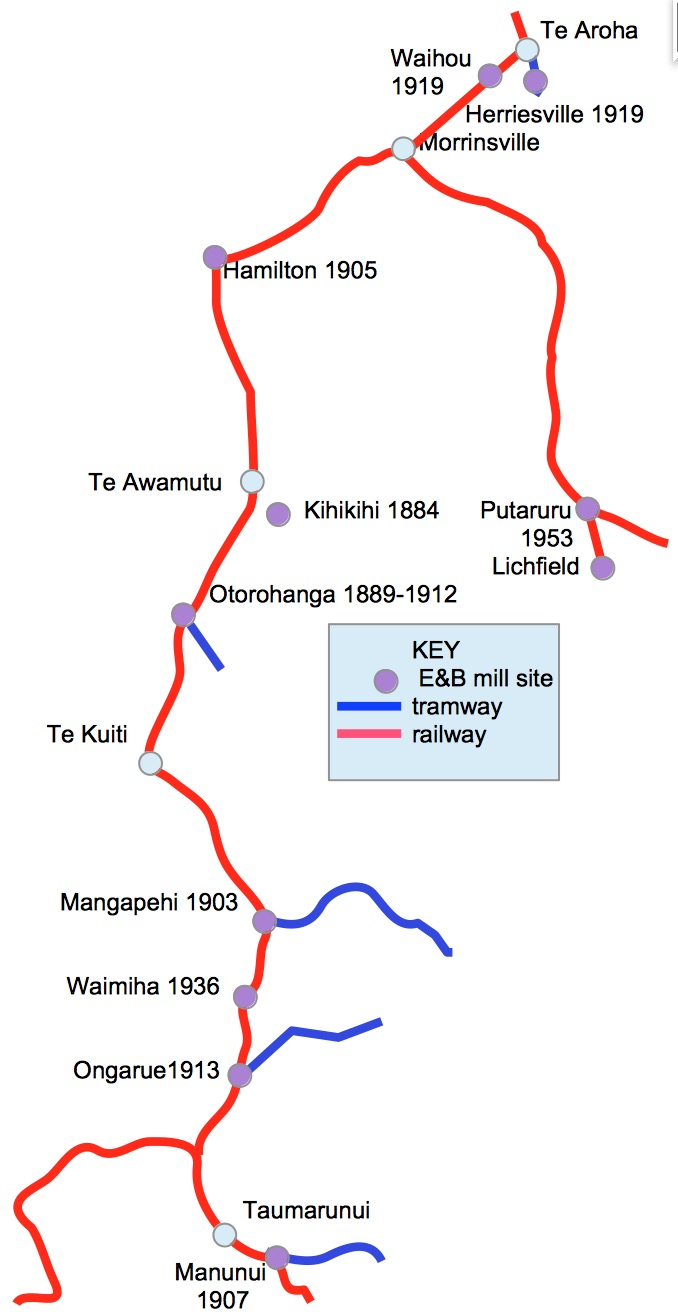
locations and start dates of sawmills

Ellis & Burnand's cutting sites were linked to their sawmills by bush tramways, one of which forms the southern end of the Timber Trail cycleway, opened in 2013.

== Origins ==
Ellis's first venture into timber milling seems to have started at Ōrākau, near Kihikihi (where he ran a store) in 1884, though the sources differ on several dates in this period, some saying it wasn't until 1886. He then employed 4 men on 2 saw benches, powered by an 8 hp portable steam engine.

Having started in 1884, Ellis seems to have left further expansion in milling for a few years. Coulthard Bros had a mill at Ohaupo, which they moved to Rahu, Te Awamutu in 1882. Graham joined the mill in 1883, Stephen N Westney in 1885, then Ellis seems to have joined them at Rangiaohia from 1889 to 1890. 'Established 1889' was on the sign over the Ellis & Burnand Ltd head office in 1905 (see photo above).

In 1889 railway engineer, Harry Burnand, and local storekeeper, John Ellis, spent 6 days taking a canoe down the Ongarue and Whanganui Rivers from Poro-o-tarao tunnel, where Harry was inspector of works.

== Sites ==
=== Otorohanga ===
Ellis and Henry Lewis started building a sawmill at Otorohanga early in 1890, with a daily capacity of 10,000 ft (3,000 m), milling kahikatea and rimu, and probably including plant from Ellis's 1884 Kihikihi mill. By the end of the year they were seeking tenders for a short tramway.

Ellis and Burnand became business partners in 1890 (or, more probably, in 1891), when Burnand bought Lewis's interest in the Otorohanga mill and left his railway job. Ellis's partnership with Lewis was dissolved on 12 August 1891, the first reference to 'Ellis and Burnand' being later that month. The tramway was mentioned in 1892. The Otorohanga bush was exhausted and the mill closed in 1912.

Though the mill had closed by then, the 1919 Railways Authorisation Bill included a, "branch line from Otorohanga, along right bank of the Waipa River, to the south boundary of Block VI, Mangaoronga survey district. Length about 7½ miles." The Railway Atlas indicates the line was horse worked, served the Ellis and Burnand Mill, as well as the Rangitoto Colliery, and existed by 1921.

=== Mangapehi ===
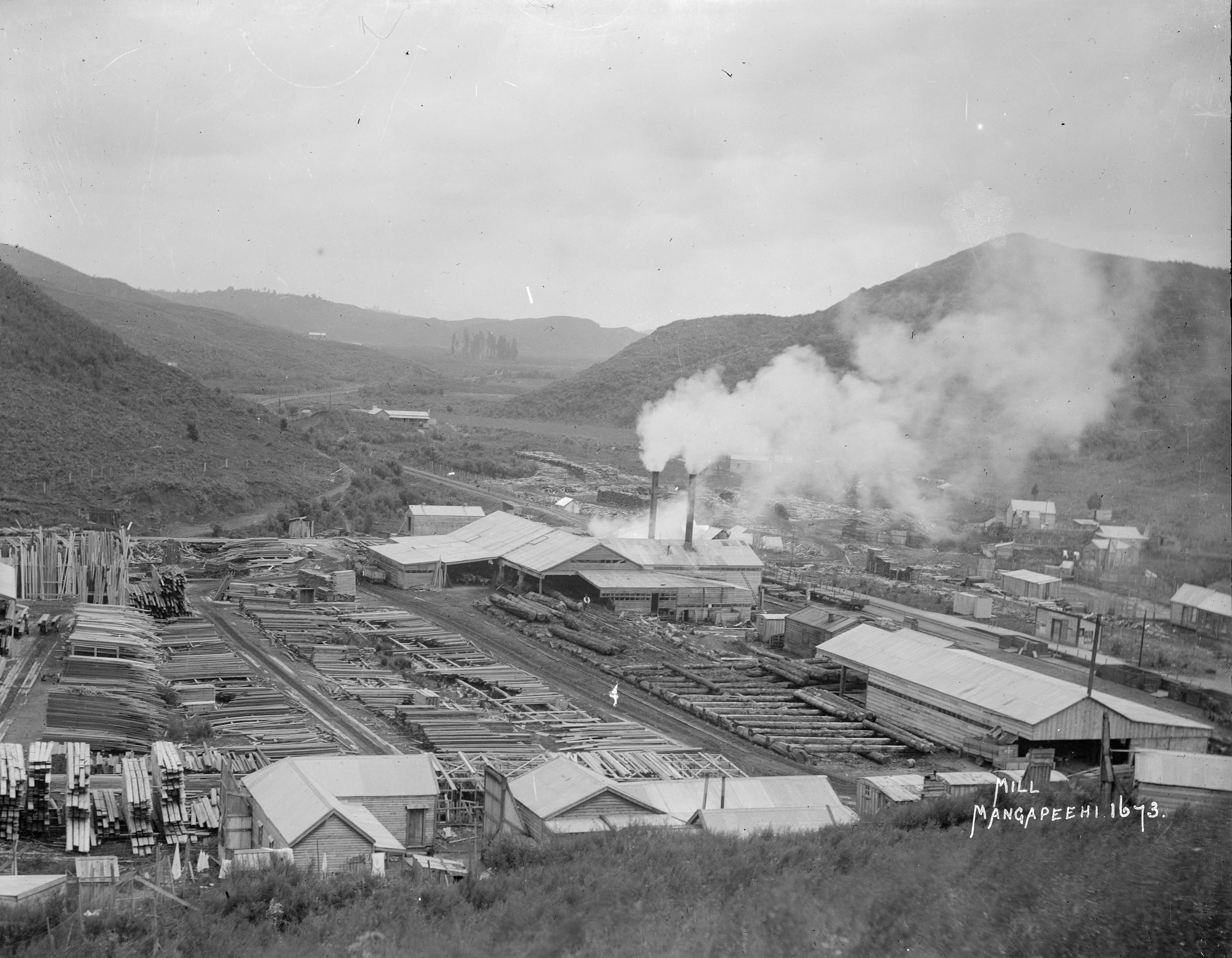
Mangapehi Sawmill, Ellis and Burnand Ltd

Ellis became the confidential adviser of King Tāwhiao, which helped him acquire timber rights over large areas of bush near Manunui, Otorohanga and Mangapehi, so that he focussed on the timber trade and sold his stores about 1897.

Next year, in 1898, Ellis secured further timber rights over 30,163 acres (12,207 ha) at Rangitoto Tuhua, also known as Te Tiroa. By 1901, they had a small portable mill at Tiroa, with some of the timber used for building the larger Mangapehi mill.

This allowed the company to expand, saying in 1909, "My company hold no Crown land for sawmilling purposes other than the sawmillsites at Manunui and Mangapeehi. Our timber-rights are all in the form of agreements with Natives." Other mills established in the 1900s found themselves in difficulties due to more restricted access to native bush. Expansion was also assisted by development the steam hauler, which replaced bullock teams and increased the area of millable bush that could be worked profitably.

The Mangapehi site was about 30 km (19 mi) south of Te Kūiti on the newly opened NIMT railway, near totara and rimu bush. The railway needed many totara sleepers. In 1900 10,000 were delivered to Mangapehi, in 1901 20,000 to Ongarue and 5,000 to Mangapehi and another 3,000 to Ongarue in 1903.

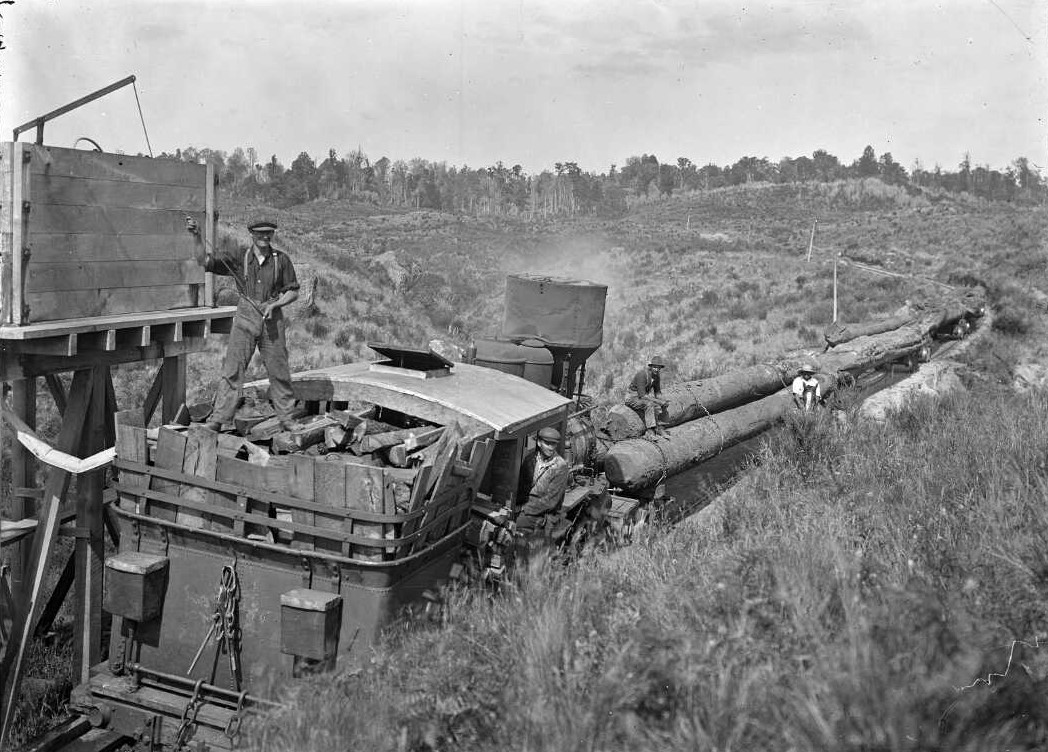
Climax loco with log train on Mangapehi mill tramway about 1922

Work started in 1902 and Mangapehi mill opened in 1903, or 1904, after lengthy construction, including 11 mi (18 km) of tramway. The tramway was still being built in 1904. In 1905 a Climax loco, able to cope with the 1 in 15 grades, replaced horses. By 1909 Mangapehi mill had over 14 mi (23 km) of tramway, built at an average cost of over £1,000 per mile.

In 1903, the capital value of Ellis and Burnand's operations was about £30,000. To meet these development costs the company negotiated with the Melbourne-based Kauri Timber Company, which bought a 47.5% stake in Ellis and Burnand in 1904. From then to 1907, the Mangapehi mill did not return a profit, but from 1908 to 1911 the company made net profits of around £10,000 to £18,000 a year. By 1909 the capital of the company had risen to £75,000. That was represented by 4 King-country sawmills and a sash, door, and butter-box factory at Hamilton, the total capacity of the mills being about 1,500,000 ft (460,000 m) a month, employing 3 to 400 men.

As Mangapehi was remote, the development costs included a public hall, social club, billiard rooms, bowling and croquet greens, tennis courts, football and cricket fields, a post office, a school, stores, medical services, ambulance, public library, a railway station and roads.

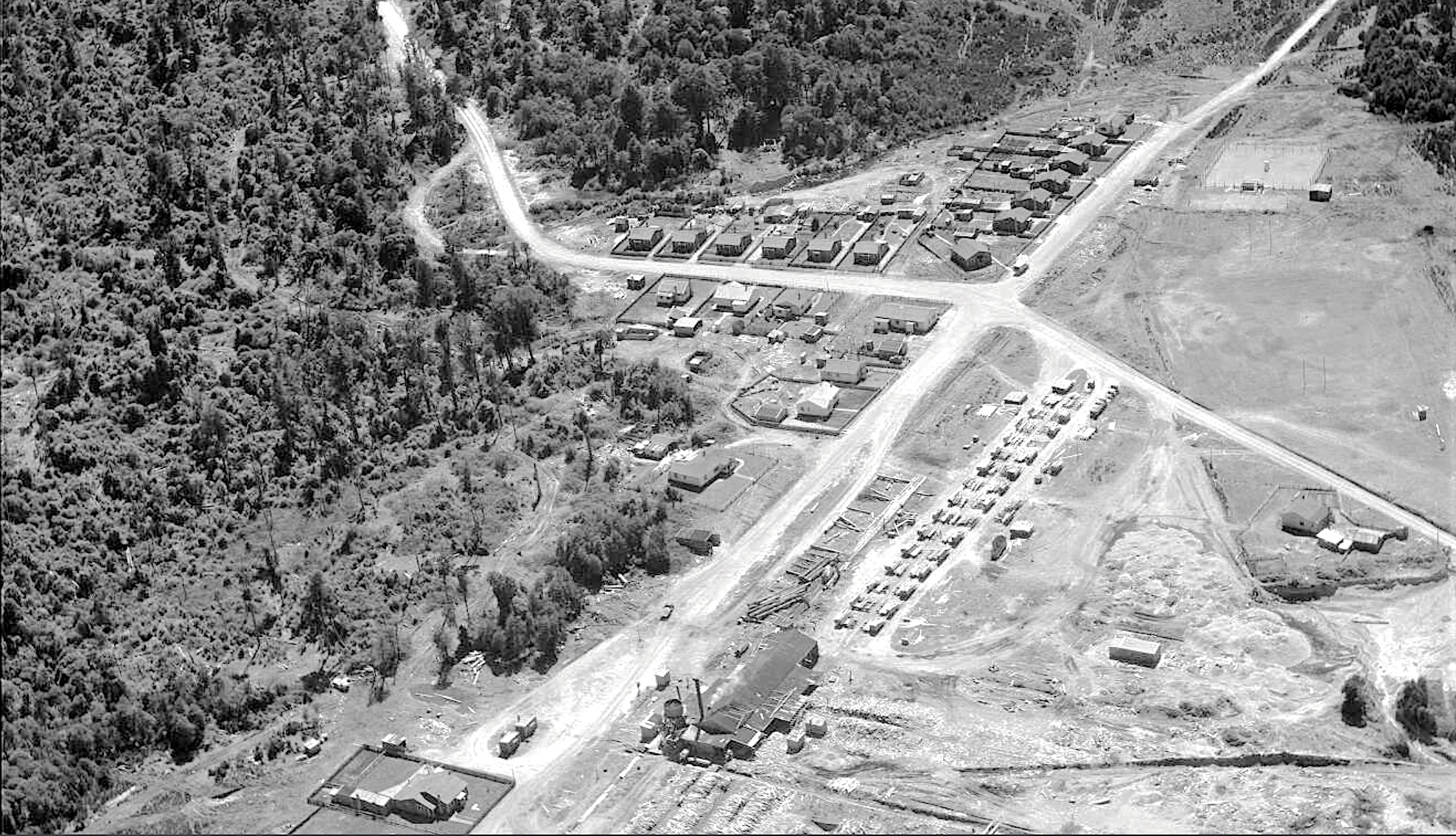
Maraeroa mill in 1953

Ellis & Burnand's profits benefitted from inflation from 1908 to 1924, when royalties for timber were increased, with a new agreement signed in 1925. Almost 200 were then working at Mangapehi. The mill closed in 1968.

In 1936 3 mills and bush areas were bought from Hayward Timber Company at Waimiha, but were exhausted by 1945 and the cottages, mill and most of the staff were transferred to Mangapehi.

Although most of the logs from Maraeroa (in the centre of Pureora forest) were milled at Mangapehi, Ellis & Burnand had a large mill at Maraeroa from 1945 to at least 1965.

=== Hamilton ===
Ellis and Burnand's headquarters were transferred from Otorohanga to Hamilton in 1905 (or 1906) after they bought Coyle & Jolly's Hamilton sash and door factory in 1904 and then expanded it. A tramway and Grey St West were built to the works in 1904 and plans made for a drying kiln, offices and workers housing. By January 1905 the factory had begun production and was employing 40 staff. By 1906 it was producing barrels, furniture and 1,100 butter boxes a day, employing 53. The Hamilton factory was burnt down in 1916 but a larger one replaced it, though box making was transferred to Manunui, leaving joinery, doors, planing, resawing and retailing of timber at Hamilton, opening beside Hamilton railway station about 1917.

A new head office was started in 1924 on the corner of Bryce and Victoria Streets. It was sold in 1953 and replaced by a new office at the Bryce St yard. By then the Hamilton yard also had an 18,000 ft^{2} (1,700 m^{2}) pre-fabricated house factory able to build over 100 houses a year, and a block board factory with three drying kilns. The houses had been produced for some years prior to 1953, probably about 1934. A seaside cottage was being sold for £55 in 1925. Houses were displayed at Waikato Winter Shows, including a 4-room 'Economy Cottage' in 1932. The former yard is now the site of Hamilton Transport Centre.

=== Manunui ===
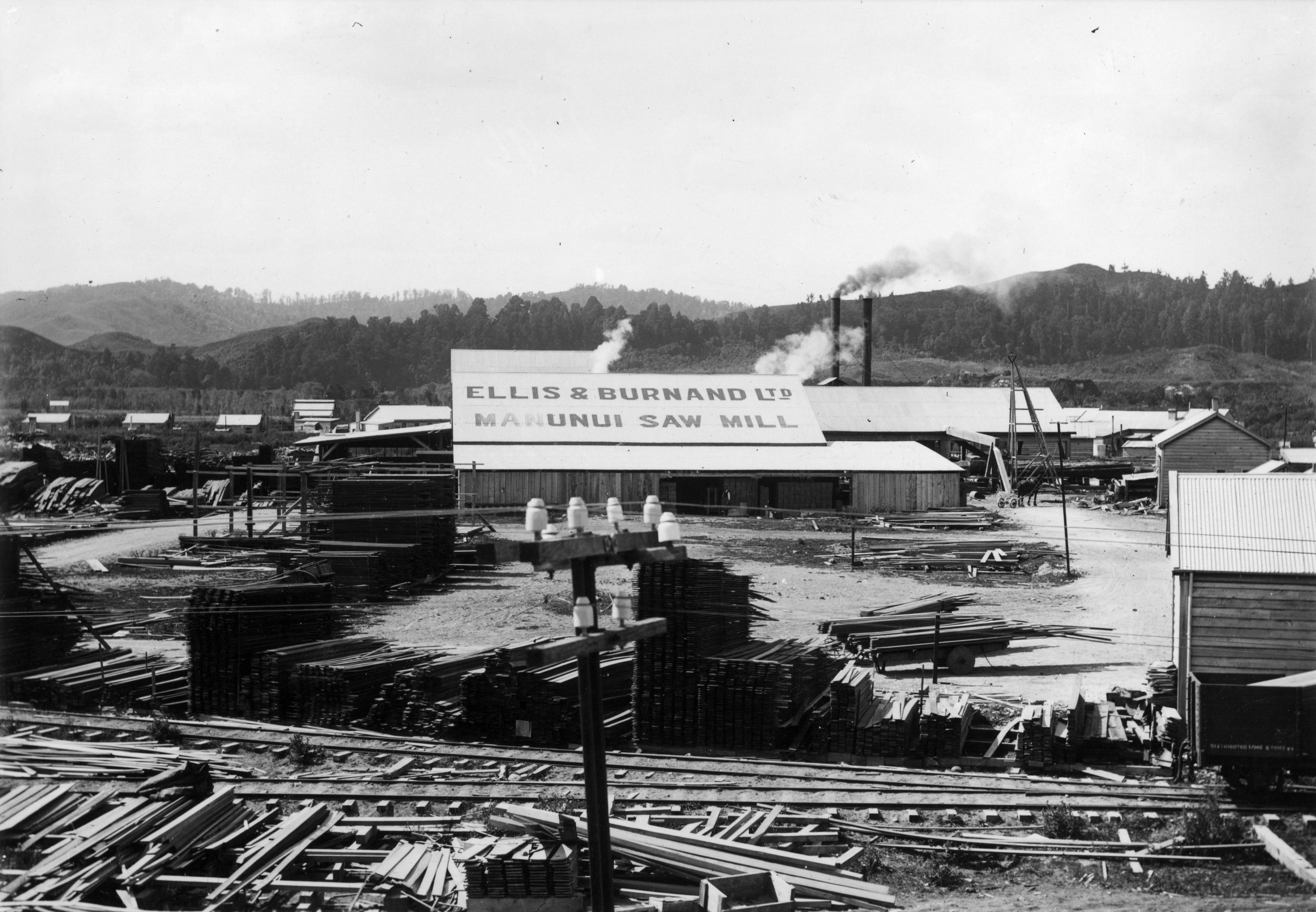
Manunui mill before 1915 fire

After extension of the railway to Taumarunui in 1903, the Waimarino (renamed Manunui) to Ohotaka tramway was built, with a 340 ft (100 m) bridge over the Whanganui River in 1905, though it had only been put out to tender at the beginning of the year. By 1909 Manunui had over 5 mi (8.0 km) of steel tramway.

The timber mill and box factory opened at Manunui in 1907 and a plywood and veneer factory in 1911. Manunui became a mill village, with mill workers' houses on acre blocks. During the depression work for all 270 staff was cut to 4 days a week. The main work then was milling kahikatea for butter boxes and strawberry baskets.

The mill closed in 1942, when the bush had been felled. A fire burnt down the sawmill in 1949, but the Ellis Veneer works and offices were saved. In 1953 they were producing about 7,000,000 ft (2,100,000 m) of plywood a year.

=== Ongarue ===
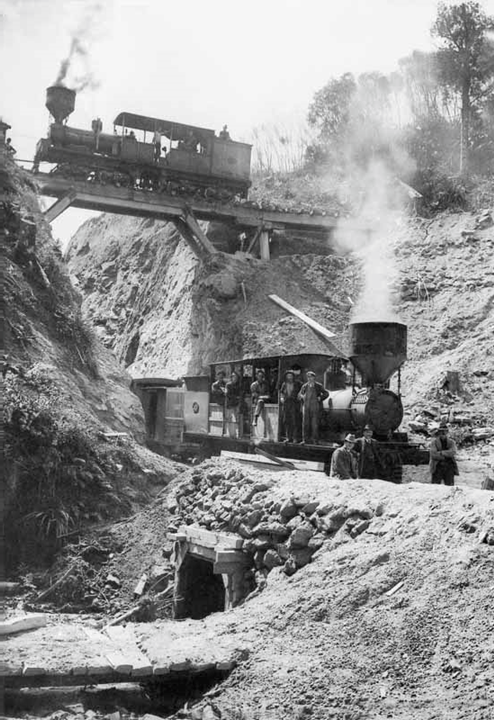
A&G Price locomotives on the Ellis & Burnand Tramway, Ongarue

Ellis & Burnand bought the Taumarunui Totara Co mill and started to replace it with a much larger one at Ongarue in 1913. Ongarue mill closed in 1914 and reopened in 1920 with 10 mi (16 km) of tramway. By 1953 the tramway extended 25 mi (40 km) from the mill and had 2 locomotives. During the period of maximum output the annual production was 16m feet of native timber. The mill was still registered in 1961. Since 2011 part of the old tramway has formed the Timber Trail.

=== Waihou and Herriesville ===
Ellis & Burnand began its first milling of plantation grown Pinus radiata near Te Aroha, at Herriesville and Waihou, both on the former East Coast Main Trunk railway, from at least 1919 to 1923.

=== Waimiha ===
2 mills were bought at Waimiha in 1936.

=== Putaruru ===
By 1953 Pinus radiata formed over 40% of Ellis & Burnand's total timber production of 16,000,000 ft (4,900,000 m) from its Mangapehi, Ongarue and Putaruru mills, which represented about 3% of the national milling output of 573,000,000 ft (175,000,000 m). Sawmills were established at Putaruru, producing in the aggregate, after they bought a block of pines at Lichfield and a 30 acres (12 ha) mill site in 1951. Cutting started in May 1952. This was their last mill cutting about 6m feet of pine annually.

=== Raglan ===
From 1957 to 1980 there was a timber yard in Raglan, between Bankart and Stewart Streets. A 1964 advert listed sawn and dressed timbers, hardware, paints, wallboards, joinery, doors and plywood, under the slogan "E. & B's are a veritable Aladdin's treasure house".

== Directors ==
The company was originally run by Ellis and Burnand. In 1903 Henry Valder went into partnership with them as the company became the largest sawmiller in the King Country. Valder became managing director from 1908 until 1932, was chairman of the board from 1918 until 1942, and a long-time district representative and vice president (1917–26) on the Dominion Federated Sawmillers' Association. Other managing directors were H Holder in 1919, C V Valder in 1920, S Valder in 1928, Henry Valder in 1931, A B Collier 1932–1944, Arthur E McCracken in 1945 and A H Delaney in 1953.

== Remnants ==
Fletcher Holdings proposed to take over in 1979. Purchase was completed in 1980 and branches were converted to the PlaceMakers brand. In Huntly the Ellis & Burnand name was last in the phone book in 1994. $1.96m was paid by the Forestry Service to end Pureora contracts in 1981.

The Hamilton head office and yard site were used for Hamilton Transport Centre in 2001.

Houses, furniture and fittings made by the company remain, as do parts of their tramways, the Timber Trail being especially accessible. A station building remains at Mangapehi, an NZR F class 230 was donated in 1957 for static display at Lake Rotoroa after use as a yard engine at Mangapehi and 5 locomotives are at the Bush Tramway Club.

== "Puke Puke Express" ==
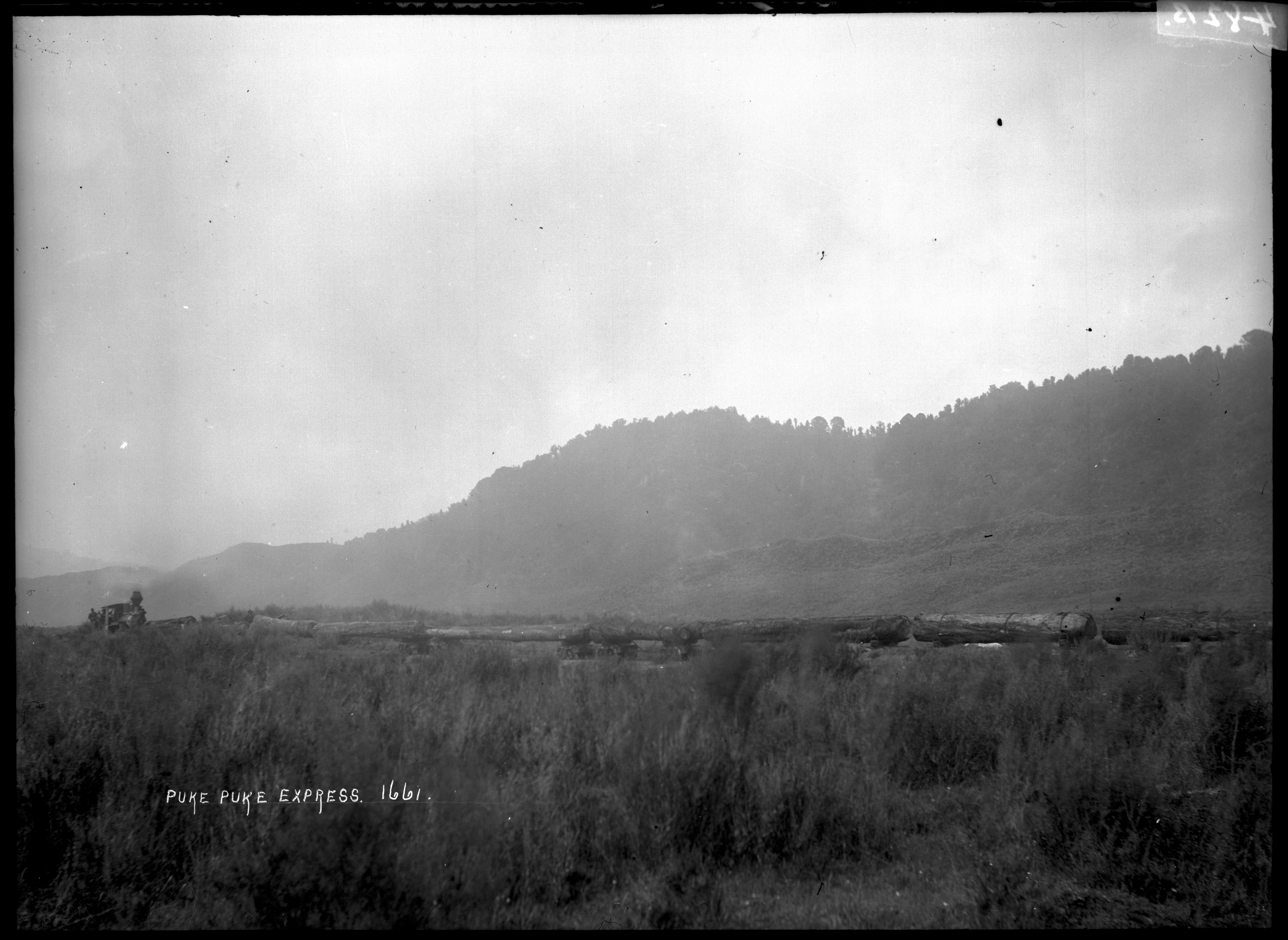
Logging train laden with logs, the "Puke Puke Express"

The title "Puke Puke Express" was etched by William Archer Price onto one of his photographic plates following a visit to the Ellis and Burnard Ltd Sawmill and bush tramway, Mangapehi, between 1905 and 1920. The locomotive shown in this photograph, is a Class B Climax locomotive, a 20-ton engine, numbered 522 and built in 1904. It was one of the seven Climax locomotives delivered to New Zealand. Note the distinctive angled cylinders in the photograph and the spark-arrest smoke stack. More detail can be seen on Alexander Turnbull collection version of this image.

The Alexander Turnbull collection also has a 1920 image of the same locomotive by Albert Godber with the smokestack slightly modified. This engine survives in a dilapidated state, housed in the Tokomaru Steam Engine Museum.

William Archer Price's 4 "Puke Puke" plates were numbered 1660–1663. Plate 1659 is labelled Mangapehi as is plate 1673, another indication that the "Puke Puke" plates were taken on his Mangapehi visit. This "Puke Puke" photographic series is currently mis-catalogued in the Alexander Turnbull collection as "Oroua County" with the caveat "Other - A library client thinks this image is more likely to have been taken in the Mangapehi-Tiroa area or Pukemako." The bush and terrain in the 4 photos fit with the Mangapehi interior.

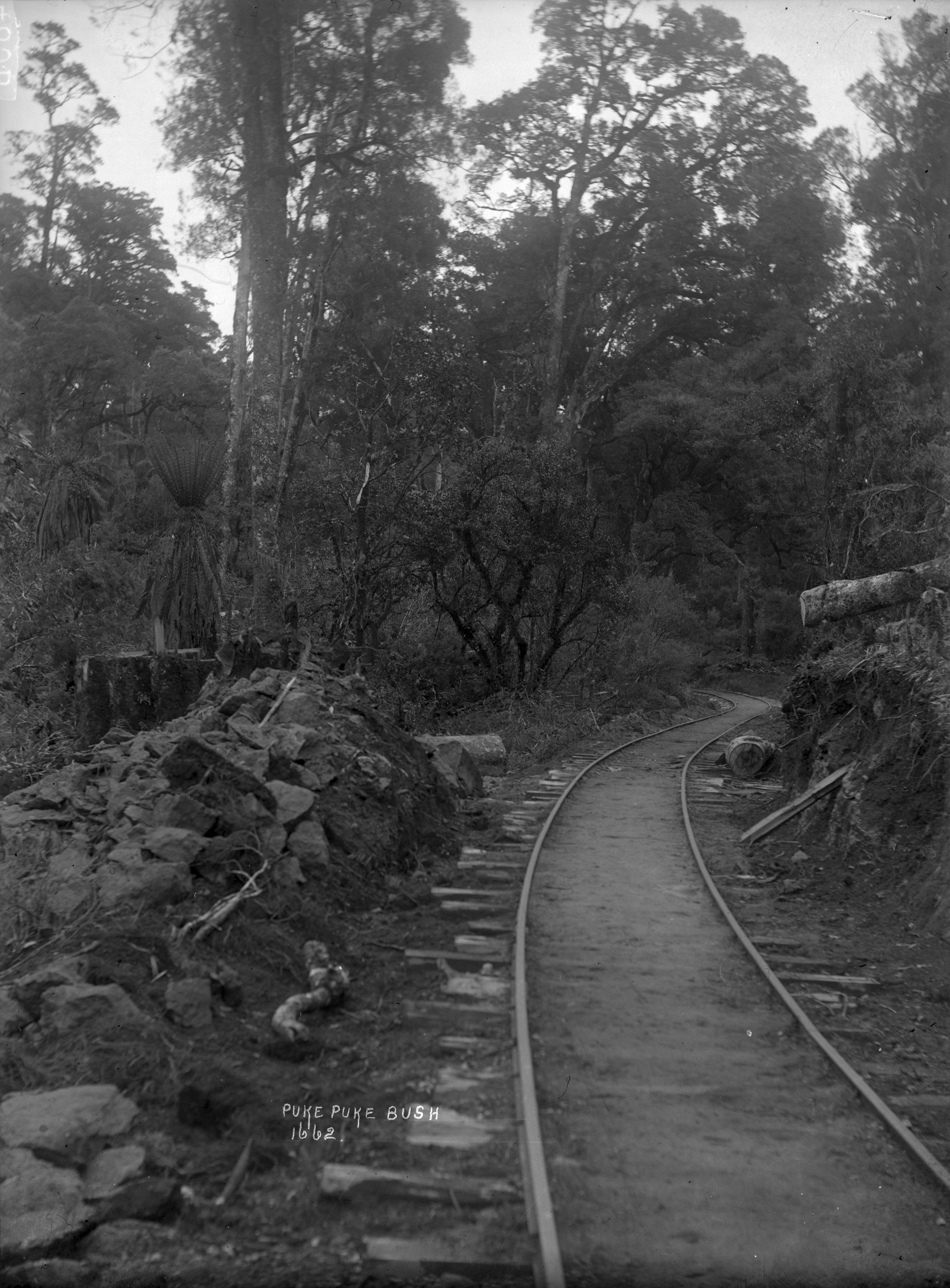
Logging railway track through native bush near Mangapehi

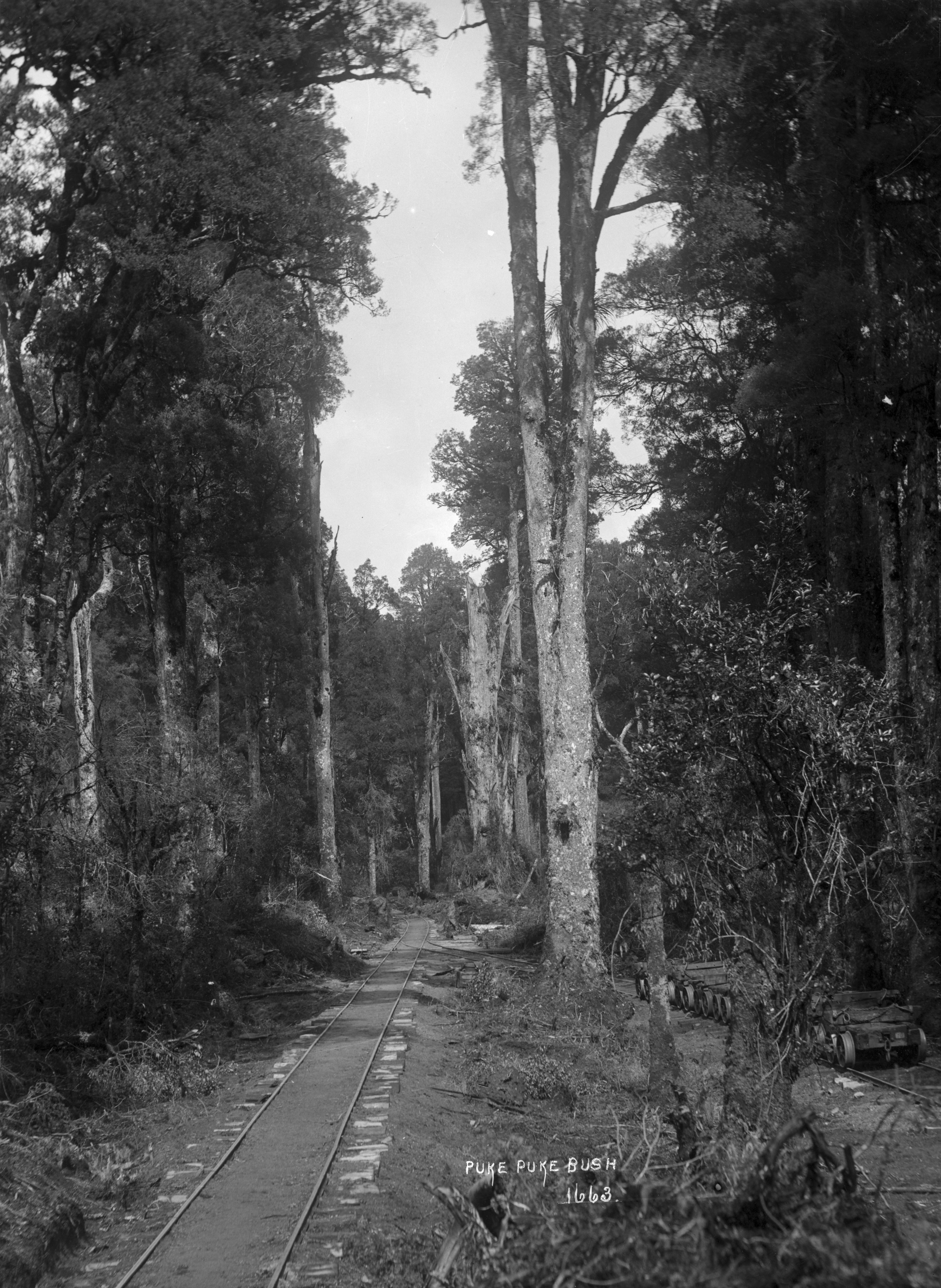
Logging railway track near Mangapehi

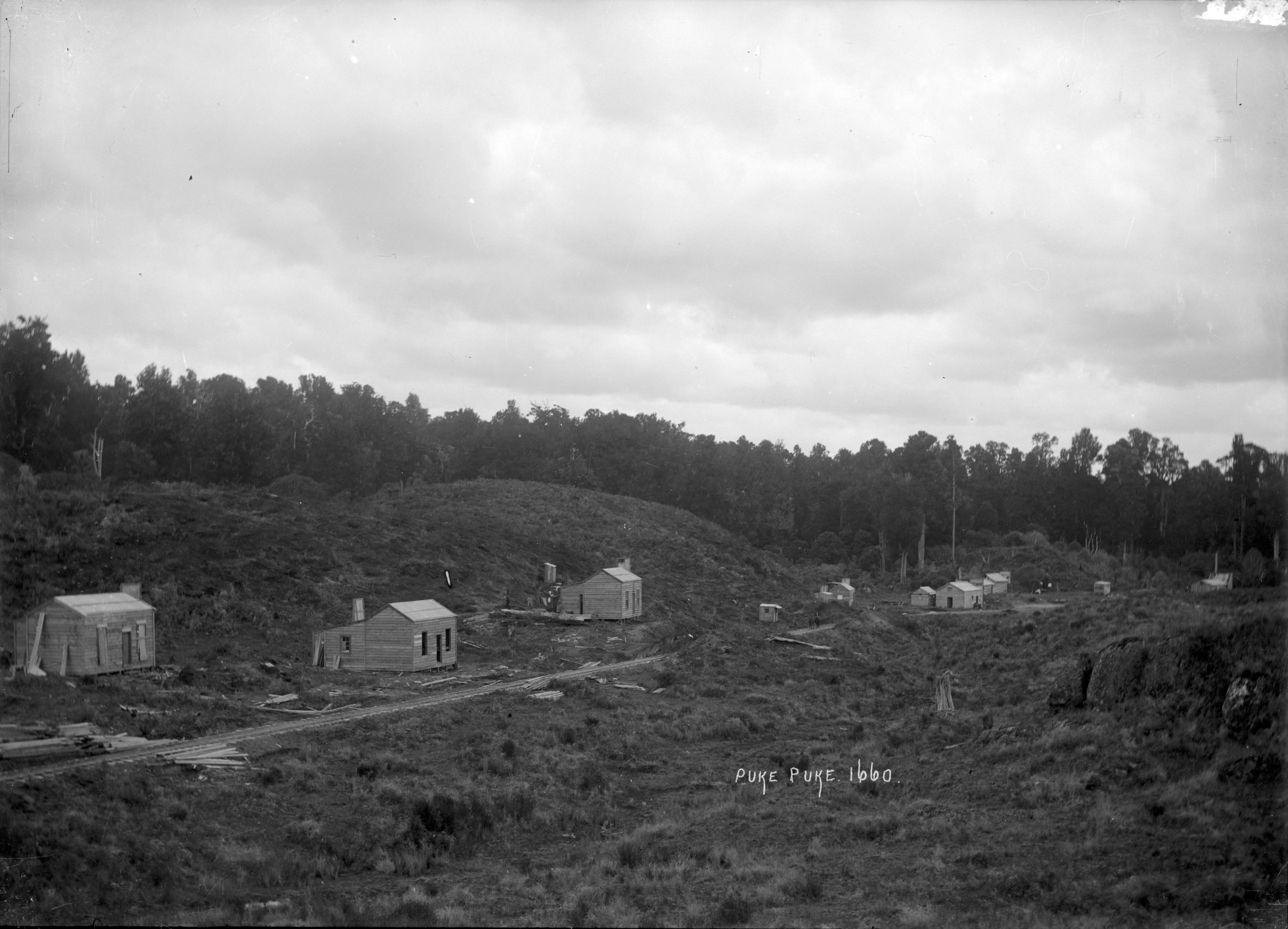
A sawmilling settlement near Mangapehi

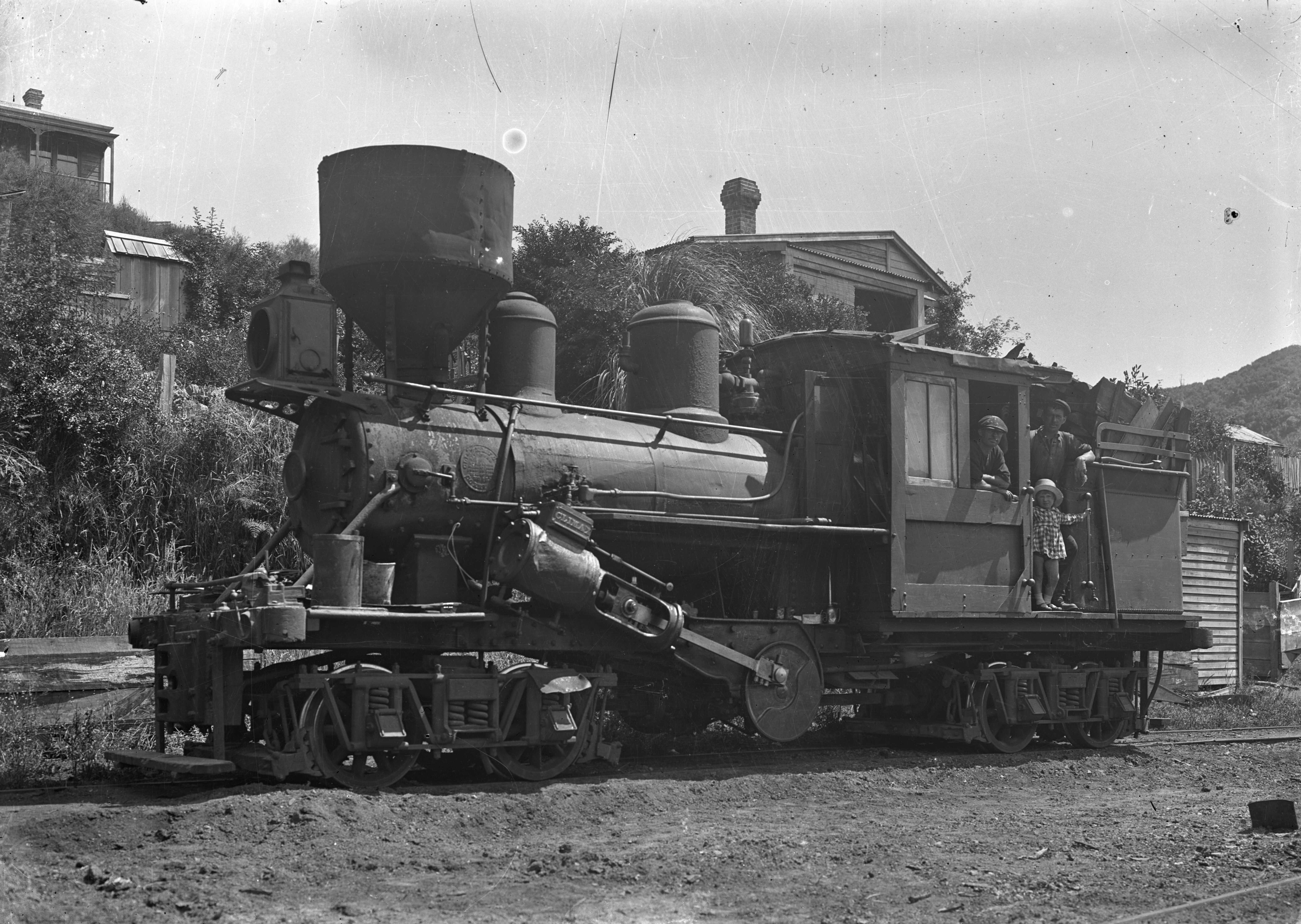
Climax Locomotive 522 at Mangapehi, 1920
