= Ongarue railway disaster =

1923 rail accident in New Zealand

Coordinates: 38.7158°S 175.2823°E

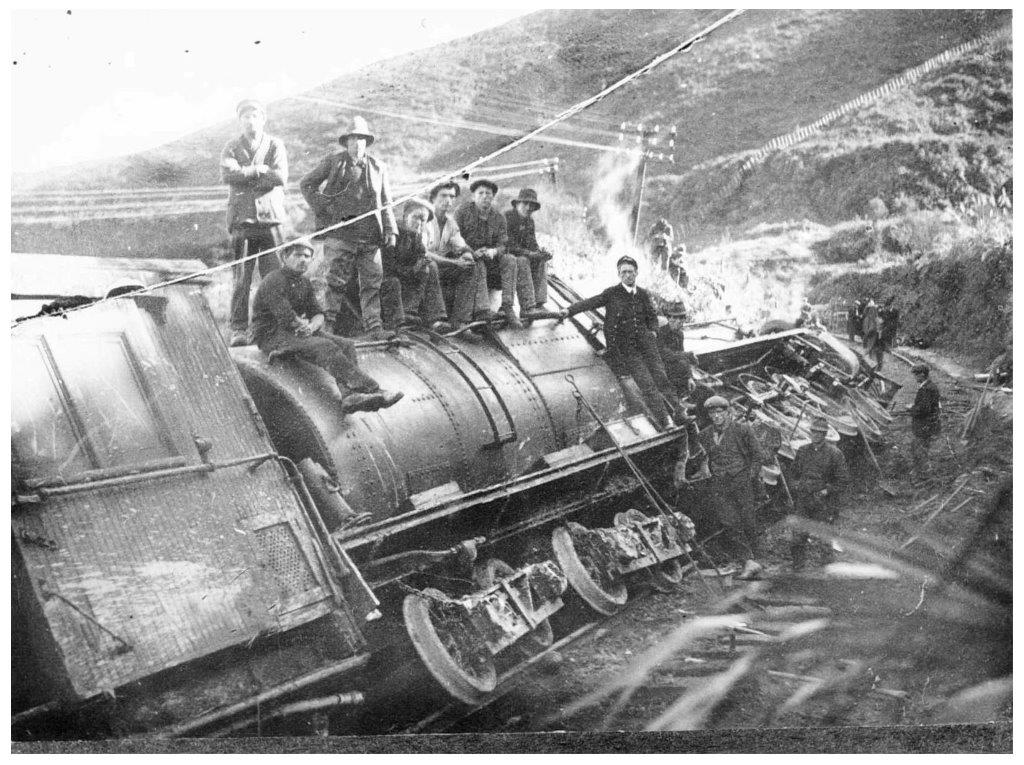
- Derailed locomotive

Details
- Date: 6 July 1923; 05:52 NZST
- Location: Ongarue, North Island
- Country: New Zealand
- Line: North Island Main Trunk Railway
- Operator: New Zealand Railways Department
- Incident type: Derailment
- Cause: Struck landslip in which was embedded a large boulder

Statistics
- Trains: 1
- Passengers: 200
- Deaths: 17

The Ongarue railway disaster occurred on 6 July 1923 near the small settlement of Ongarue, near Taumarunui, North Island, New Zealand, when an overnight express ran into a landslip. Of the 200 passengers on board, 17 died and 28 were injured. The disaster marked the first major loss of life in New Zealand railway history; the Christchurch Press noted that each of the previous fatal railway accidents had resulted in no greater loss of life than that resulting from an overturned motor car.

The Ongarue disaster remains the third worst railway accident in New Zealand's history. Almost exactly twenty years later on 4 June 1943, its death toll was surpassed in the Hyde railway disaster, which claimed 21 lives. Ten years after that, 151 died in the Tangiwai disaster.

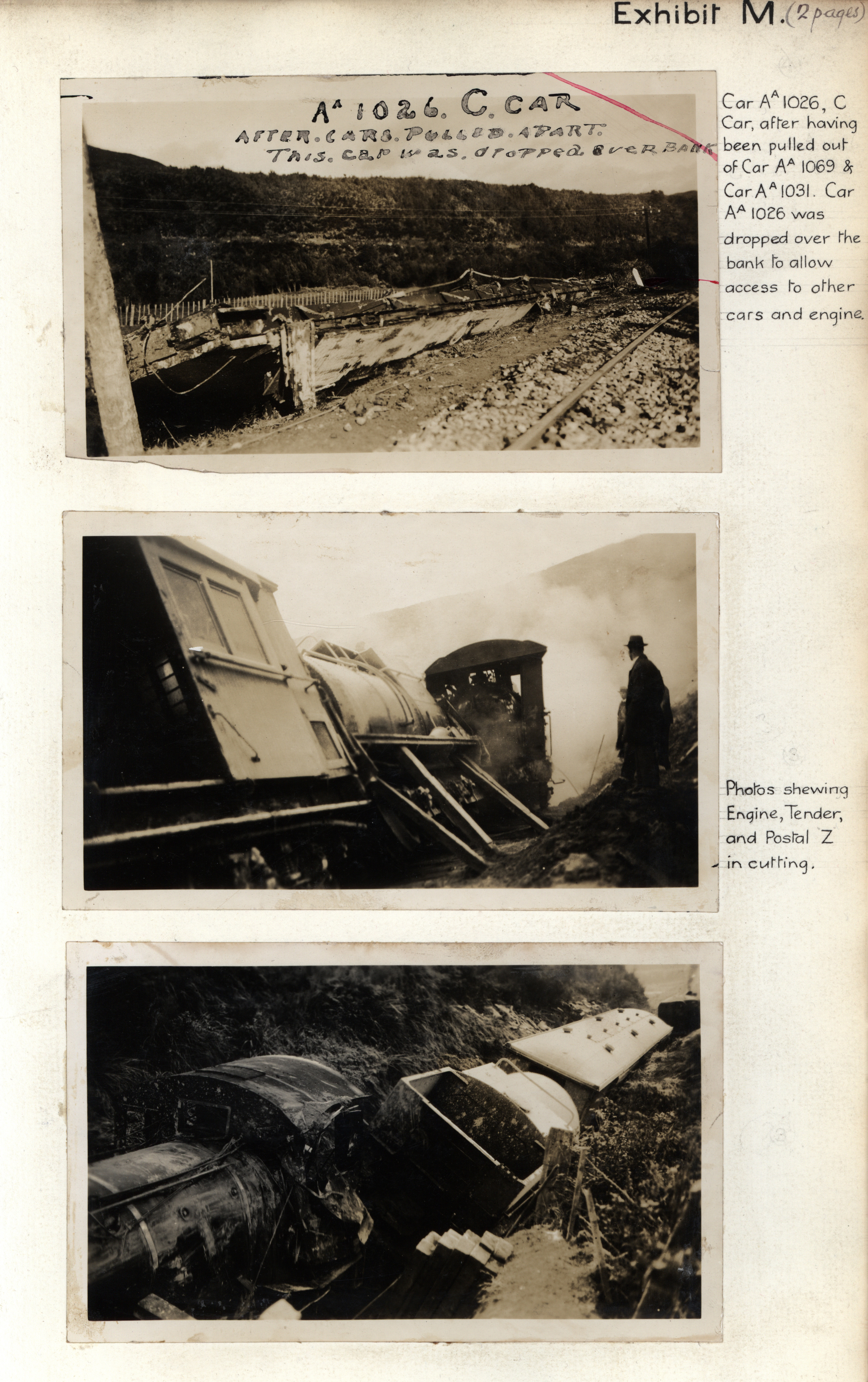
Ōngarue Rail Accident, 6 July 1923

== Accident ==
On the evening of 5 July 1923, the North Island Main Trunk Railway's Auckland to Wellington express was timetabled to leave Auckland at 7.10 pm, but was held for more than four hours. One report said that authorities were forced to await news on rain-swollen areas of the Waikato through which the express would pass, and the decision to go was not made until 10 pm. It also said that the earlier northbound express on the same route had been delayed due to landslips, and cleaning of the carriages had been necessary before it could return to Wellington as the ill-fated southbound express. The express eventually left Auckland at 11.25 pm with about 200 passengers aboard.

As the locomotive rounded a curve just south of Ongarue at about 5.52 am the next morning, it struck a landslip caused by heavy rain. Embedded in the landslip was a boulder of about 1.5 metres diameter. This boulder derailed the locomotive and threw it onto the bank of a cutting, causing the first and second carriages to telescope completely. The third carriage was partly telescoped onto the second. The postal van, between the locomotive and first carriage, was almost undamaged and none of its three postal workers were injured. About four chains (88 yards, 80 metres) of track were torn up in the accident.

Mr A. Stewart, the driver, said that he had shut off steam at the top of a rise and the train was proceeding downhill under its own weight. As it rounded a sharp bend he got a glimpse of the slip and the engine ploughed through it before he could apply brakes. Stewart thought the train could have cleared the slip safely but for the "huge boulder", which was carried along for two or three chains (44–66 yards, 40–60 metres) before the engine derailed. Stewart suffered a badly scalded arm and bruises on the head and thigh. Mr Campbell, the fireman, was badly scalded and suffered cuts to his nose and an ear.

The train's guard, H.P. Hobson, stated in an interview that the train cleared Ongarue and was then running about 25 to 30 miles per hour (42–50 km/h). About a minute and a half later, the train came to a sudden stop. Hobson sent the sleeping-car attendant back along the track to Ongarue to raise the alarm. A relief train from Taumarunui arrived within two hours after the disaster, carrying rail workers and equipment. Hobson confirmed that the presence of the boulder in the slip was primarily responsible for the telescoping of the second-class carriages, in which all the casualties occurred. He described in detail the circumstances of the wreckage and injured, and said that the first of the injured were sent to Taumarunui within two or three hours after the disaster, with the remainder arriving there shortly after noon.

== Casualties ==
Seventeen passengers died. Eleven were killed outright, and another two died either en route to Taumarunui Hospital or shortly after arrival there. Four others subsequently died.

== Inquiry and lighting upgrades ==
The three-man board of inquiry released its report on 30 August 1923. The inquiry heard evidence from 51 witnesses and found that there were good grounds for concluding that the slip was falling as the train approached, and that boulders obstructing the track were the cause of the disaster. No railway official was found guilty of neglect.

The accident led to the upgrading of carriage and locomotive lighting with the installation of electric carriage lighting. Carriages were lit by Pintsch gas lighting; some of the gas cylinders were ruptured in the crash, and the wreckage burst into flames. Providentially, a second papa slide extinguished the fire. In 1914 the NZR General Manager E. H. Hiley had investigated the (high) cost of electric lighting and decided that gas lighting was adequate for comfort. But when the new Minister of Railways Gordon Coates heard of the crash and looked at the file, he ordered the urgent replacement of gas lighting on important passenger trains, starting with the overnight Main Trunk expresses. Stone's electric lighting equipment was ordered. In 1925 at the derailling of the Napier Express at Opapa, lighting gas was again ignited, and the commission investigated the accident wanted the upgrading expedited and completed as early as possible. By the end of the 1926-27 financial year, 173 cars had been re-equipped and 160 more were programmed in the next year. Locomotive lighting was also improved; previously locos had inadequate headlights using acetylene from calcium carbide. Electric headlights and cab-lights now had lights powered by Pyle-National steam-powered turbogenerators. By the end of the 1923-24 summer, most North Island express trains were so equipped.

== Memorial ==
A memorial to those killed in the accident was unveiled in July 2023 and a book published about the events of the crash.

== See also ==
List of rail accidents in New Zealand
