= John William Ellis =

New Zealand businessman and mayor of Hamilton

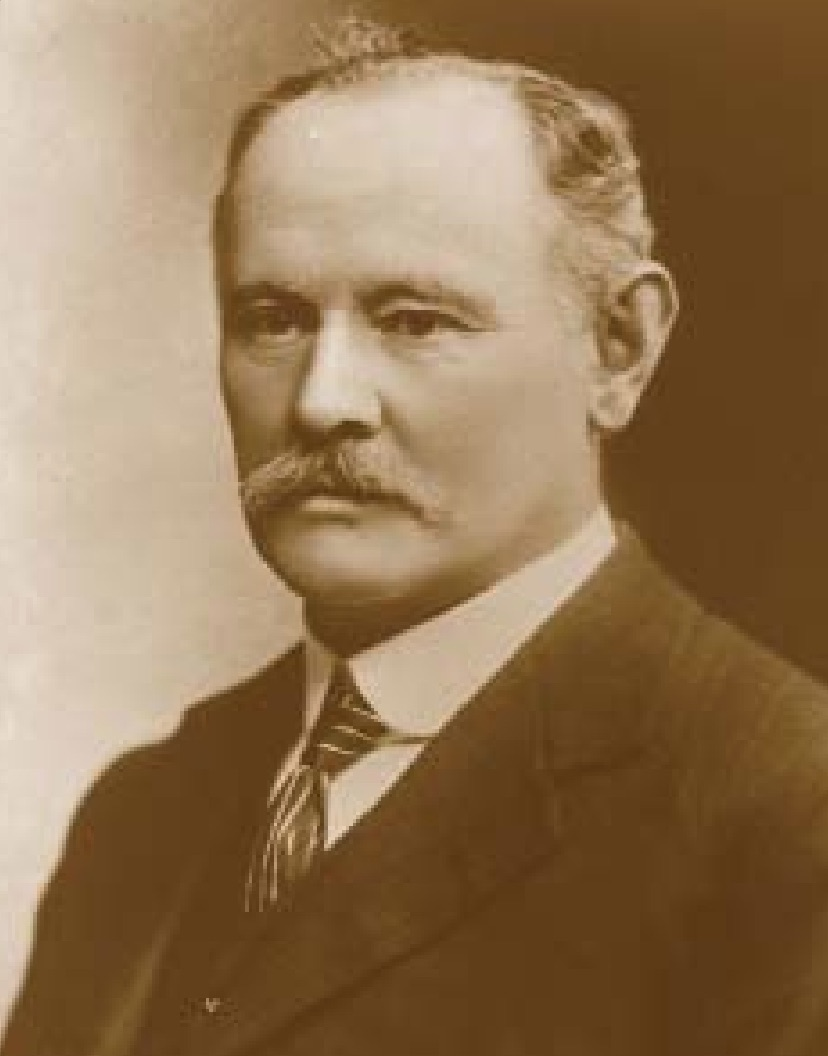

20th Mayor of Hamilton
- In office 1917–1918
- Preceded by: John Robert Fow
- Succeeded by: John Robert Fow

Personal details
- Born: 1853 Guildford, Surrey, England
- Died: 6 August 1918 (aged 64–65) Hamilton, New Zealand
- Spouse: Kauki Tauira (m. 1877) Manawa Francis (m. 1889)

John William Ellis MBE (1853 – 6 August 1918) was a New Zealand businessman and mayor of Hamilton from 1917 to 1918.

His progressive mother encouraged him to integrate with local Māori from an early age, which later facilitated his trading on the borders of the King Country and go on to gain rights to fell and mill timber. That led to formation of one of the largest timber companies, Ellis & Burnand, with its head office in Hamilton, where he became a councillor, then mayor.

== Early life and family ==
John William was born to early feminist, Ellen Elizabeth Ellis (née Colebrook), and Oliver Sidney Ellis (a builder) in 1853 at Guildford. His two younger brothers died in their childhood. They emigrated to Auckland in 1859, where his mother encouraged her sons to learn Māori and play with Māori children, so that John became an interpreter, then a teacher. He and his mother returned to England in 1864. She left him at boarding school when she returned to Auckland in 1865.

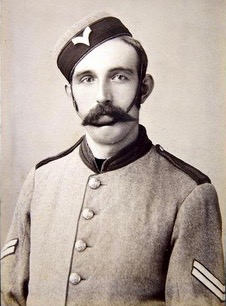
John William Ellis in military uniform in 1870s

John returned when he was 14 and worked in a stationer's shop in Auckland. Around 6 years later (in 1900 he said he'd been in the King Country for 26 years, so about 1874) he opened a general store at Moawhango.

By 1875 he had Motakotako store, just north of Aotea Harbour. That seems to coincide with a report of a post office, with a courteous postmaster, reopening to serve Aotea. Much of the trade exchanged goods for pigs, which he shipped to Auckland, at one stage owning a schooner, which was wrecked in 1877. In 1880 he was described as, "acquiring a reputation for honour and probity, alike from European and Maori, which a prince might envy; and his sleek teams of ten or more bullocks drawing his heavily laded American waggon (an innovation which caused much needless speculation as to its usefulness), as seen winding along the ill-formed roads of the unkempt wilderness". John sold the Motakotako store in 1882.

At Motakotako John taught Wiremu Tauira's daughter, Te Remi Kauki Tauira, European ways and, despite attempts to discourage a romance, in 1877, he and Kauki seem to have been approved in a Māori hui 'marriage'. A daughter, Lucy, was born in 1879. John and Kauki separated in 1885 after she was called home by her family. She died at Rukumoana Marae in 1922. Lucy married John, son of Rev. J. H. Gray.

John's father, Oliver, died on 12 March 1883 and his mother, Ellen, on 17 April 1895. John burnt most copies of his mother's 1882 feminist novel, believing his father to be an occasional drinker, rather than the drunkard portrayed in the novel.

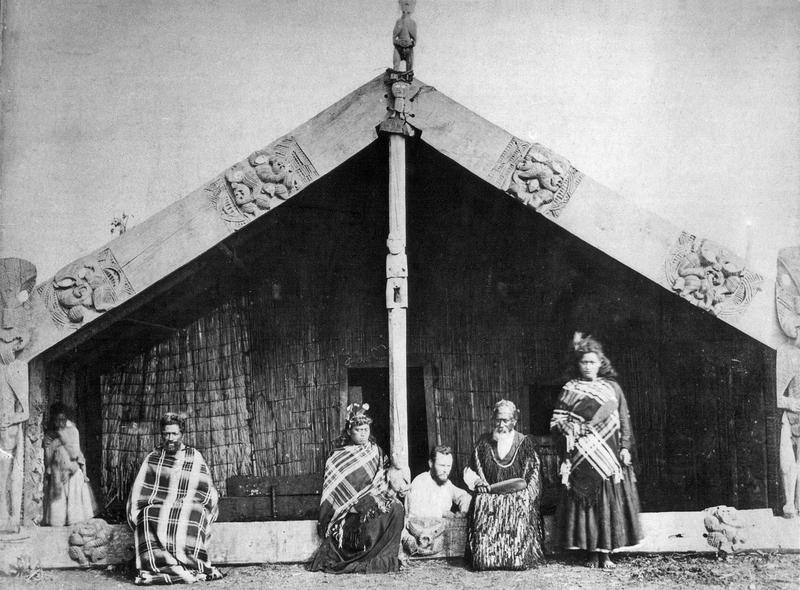
Te Tokanganui-a-noho originally stood at Motakotako, with Ellis (right of centre) and his first wife (right)

The sources are sometimes not quite in agreement as to dates, or people over the next decade, but it seems that in December 1882 (or 1883), John and Kauki moved to Kihikihi, where John built a new store. J.W. Ellis House is now a heritage building at 37a Whitaker Street, Kihikihi and he continued with the store until at least 1893. Henry Valder joined as a partner in 1884. The old store and home at Motakotako burnt down about 1885.

John's first venture into timber milling seems to have started at Ōrākau, near Kihikihi in 1884, though other sources say it wasn't until 1886. He then employed 4 men on 2 saw benches, powered by an 8 hp portable steam engine.

John moved to Ōtorohanga in 1885, where he became postmaster and opened another store with Valder and John Taonui Hetet, of Ngāti Maniapoto descent. J T Hetet & Co built the first building in Te Kūiti, then joining with John, also just before the arrival of the railway construction gangs, though still there when a raid at the store resulted in a police invasion in 1890. Between the mid-1880s and mid 1890s Ellis Bros & Valder stores were set up at Tokaanu, Taupō and followed the navvies up the North Island Main Trunk line as it was built, with stores at Hunterville, Ōhingaiti and Taihape. Valder sold his interest in the stores in 1900 and returned to England, but was soon to reappear in John's business life.

In 1888, or 1889 (though his obituary said he was 33) John married his second wife, Manawa Hinewai (her obituary said she was born in Tauranga, daughter of Major F Francis), of Kihikihi (a close relative of Ngāti Maniapoto chief, Rewi) and they had 4 children, Stanley, Percy, Marjorie (Mrs Rickets) and Sidney. Sidney, was wounded near Cairo in 1916 (or in the Dardanelles in 1915) and returned later that year to be a timber merchant. Stanley became an engineer, Percy a farmer at Puketarata, near Ōtorohanga, and Sidney, who was back by 1919, stayed in sawmilling. Stanley died on 3 February 1946, aged 58.

== Sawmilling ==
Having started in 1884, John seems to have left further expansion in milling for a few years. Coulthard Bros had a mill at Ohaupo, which they moved to Rahu, Te Awamutu in 1882. Graham joined the mill in 1883, Stephen N Westney in 1885, then John seems to have joined them at Rangiaohia from 1889 to 1890.

=== Ellis and Burnand ===
In 1889 railway engineer, Harry Burnand, and John spent 6 days taking a canoe down the Ongarue and Whanganui Rivers from Poro-o-tarao tunnel, where Harry was inspector of works.

Henry Lewis and John started building a sawmill at Ōtorohanga early in 1890, with a daily capacity of 10,000 ft (3,000 m), mostly of kahikatea, and probably including plant from John's 1884 Kihikihi mill. By the end of the year they were seeking tenders for a short tramway.

John and Harry Burnand became business partners in 1890 (or, more probably, in 1891), when Harry bought Henry Lewis's interest in the Ōtorohanga mill and left his railway job. John's partnership with Henry was dissolved on 12 August 1891, the first reference to 'Ellis and Burnand' being later that month.

Becoming the confidential adviser of King Tāwhiao, helped John acquire timber rights over large areas of bush at Manunui, Ōtorohanga and Mangapehi, which influenced him to focus on the timber trade and sell his Te Kuiti and Ōtorohanga stores about 1897 (he was still described as a store owner in 1894). Ellis and Burnand Ltd was incorporated in 1903.

In 1898, John secured timber rights over 30,163 acres (12,207 ha) at Rangitoto Tuhua, also known as Te Tiroa. By 1901, they had a small portable mill at Tiroa, with some of the timber used for building the larger Mangapehi mill started in 1902 and opened in 1903, or 1904. At the same time demand for totara sleepers was high for completion of the new railway.

In 1903, the capital value of Ellis and Burnand's operations was about £30,000. In order to meet development costs at Mangapehi, the company appears to have negotiated with the Kauri Timber Company, which in 1904 secured a 47.5% stake in Ellis and Burnand.

Ellis and Burnand's headquarters moved from Ōtorohanga to Hamilton in 1905 (or 1906) after they bought Coyle & Jolly's Hamilton sash and door factory in 1904 and then expanded it. By January 1905 the factory had begun production and was employing 40 staff.

After extension of the railway to Taumarunui, a timber mill and box factory was opened at Manunui in 1907 and a plywood and veneer factory in 1911.

John was still an active director of Ellis and Burnand in 1906, but after Henry Valder became managing director in 1908, John seems to have turned his attentions away from timber, except that in 1910 he investigated veneer making and set up Ellis Veneer Co Ltd at Manunui in 1911.

== Mayoralty ==
John's first experience of local government was his election to Karioi Highway Board in 1876. The family moved to Hamilton in 1905, where John and Manawa lived in a large villa, Muriaroha, on the corner of Lake Rd and Tainui St, in Frankton borough. He got permission for a boathouse in 1906. He was on Frankton Town Board from 1912 and then on its Borough Council. In the words of Councillor John Fow, John William Ellis "was one of those who made the Empire great". During the war Mr Ellis gave generously to patriotic movements, including a Returned Soldiers' Club, resulting in his Order of the British Empire award. In March 1917 he accepted nomination as mayor and on 4 May was elected Mayor of Hamilton, but died after only 15 months in office. Ellis Street was named after J.W. Ellis.

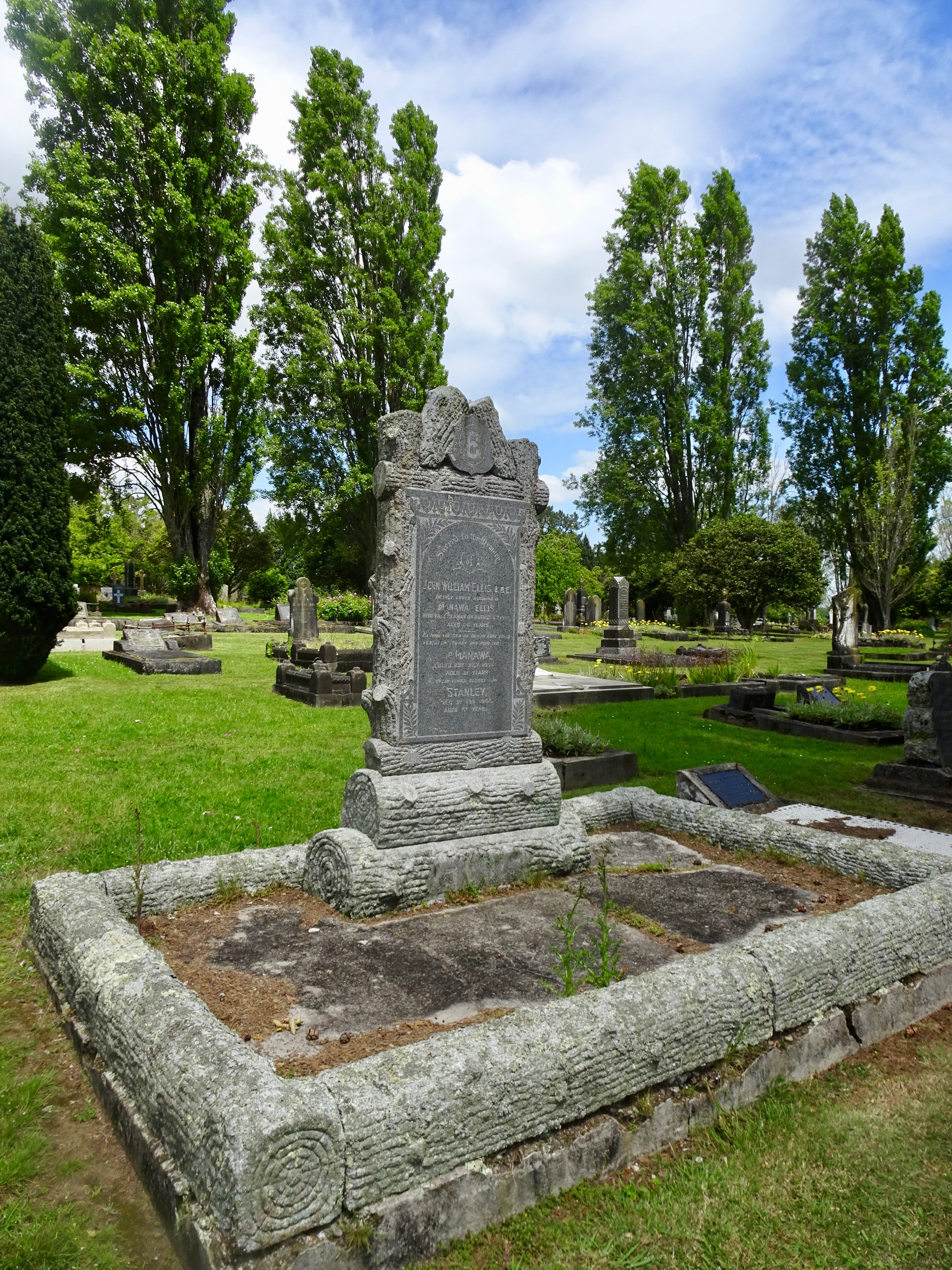
John William Ellis grave in Hamilton East Cemetery, with timber theme

== Death ==
John died at Muriaroha on 6 August 1918. He had been ill for some months, and in his last fortnight was confined to his room, suffering carbuncles and diabetes. The funeral cortege had over 60 motor vehicles. He is buried in Hamilton East Cemetery.

Manawa stayed at Muriaroha until 1926, when the house became Braemar Hospital, demolished after the hospital moved in 2009. Manawa died at Rotorua on 23 July 1955 aged 91, outliving all their children.

Political offices
Preceded by John Robert Fow	Mayor of Hamilton; 1917–1918	Succeeded by John Robert Fow
