= PlaceMakers =

New Zealand chain of DIY and trade stores

Fletcher Distribution Limited
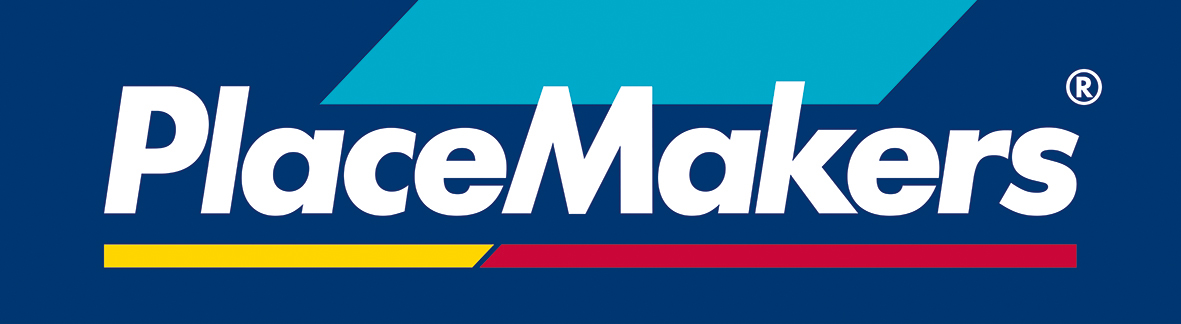
- Trade name: PlaceMakers
- Industry: Retail/DIY building supplies, trade building supplies, hardware store
- Headquarters: Auckland, New Zealand
- Number of locations: 62 (2011)
- Key people: James Peters (Chief Executive)
- Products: Timber, hardware, plumbing, farm fencing products, trade electrical supplies, hand and power tools, kitchen and bathroom, paint, landscaping products, aggregates, frame & truss
- Parent: Fletcher Building Limited
- Website: www.placemakers.co.nz

PlaceMakers is the trading name of Fletcher Distribution Limited, the retail trading arm of Fletcher Building in New Zealand. PlaceMakers also manufactures wall frames, roof trusses and structural components at various frame and truss operations. PlaceMakers origins began in August 1981 as part of Fletcher Timber Limited's retailing operations within the Manufacturing and Merchandising Sector of Fletcher Challenge Limited.

The chain has 62 stores in 2019, up from 52 in the late 1990s and early 2000s. It has 11 stores in Auckland, with a head office in Panmure, Auckland.

== History ==
=== 1910–1954 ===
Fletcher Building started selling timber in Dunedin in 1910, and continued selling it through the following decades.

=== 1954–1960 ===
The beginnings of PlaceMakers start in 1954, when Fletcher Sales & Services Limited was established to sell builders supplies and timber produced by the rest of the Fletcher Holdings Group companies. First established in Penrose, it was intended that the company would expand to have branches strategically sited throughout New Zealand.

Later in the same year the Fletcher Holdings Limited subsidiaries involved in timber production or processing were merged to form Fletcher Timber Company Limited, and the Fletcher Sales & Services Limited name changed to Fletcher Hardware. J & A Wilkinson, supplier of hardware and building materials, Dunedin was acquired.

=== 1960–1981 ===
In late 1960 Lumbermart opened. Located in Penrose the building materials supplier was the first of its type in New Zealand and operated for 30 years without major alterations. In early 1961 Fletcher Timber was operating retail outlets at Penrose (Lumbermart), Hamilton (Claudelands), Upper Hutt and Porirua.

In 1964 the company of RC Horsley was acquired. In the North Island the names of all outlets were changed to Fletcher Merchants, while in the South Island they were absorbed into the operations of Butler Bros Limited, another Fletcher Holdings Group company. In 1967 all the merchandising operations were merged into Fletcher Merchants Limited.

In 1970 Fletcher Merchants Limited became a division of Fletcher Timber Company Limited after a Fletcher Holdings Limited re-structure. In 1972 timber retail outlets were operated at Lumbermart, Hamilton, Tauranga, Ngongotahā, Carterton and Tawa.

In February 1980 the Manawatu based company, Felvins Suppliers and Distributors Limited, was acquired. The company had five branches in Manawatu, Horowhenua and Wellington. Manawatu Timber Mills and Fielding Sash & Door Limited were predecessor companies of Felvins Suppliers and Distributors Limited.

With the formation of Fletcher Challenge Limited in 1981, Fletcher Merchants Limited became part of the manufacturing & hardware sector, along with Felvins Suppliers and Distributors Limited, Ellis & Burnand, and Mount Timber & Hardware Limited, HC Kitchen Limited and the Steward Sawmilling Company.

=== 1981–1989 ===
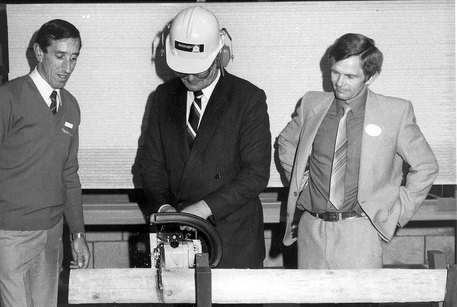
The mayor of Hamilton opens the Bryce St PlaceMakers (1982)

In 1981 the trading name of PlaceMakers first came into use. Fletcher Timber Limited changed its name to Fletcher Merchants Limited and in August 1981 the first PlaceMakers superstore is opened in Manukau City.

The Fletcher Challenge Group acquired Scott Commercial in 1983 which became a part of Fletcher Merchants Limited.

By 1984 PlaceMakers had 55 branches throughout New Zealand.

In 1986 E Daniells Limited was acquired. In that same year, a Home Improvement Centre opens at Lincoln Road, Henderson, Auckland.

==== The Winstone merger ====
The Winstone name goes back as far as 1864 and over time grew a reputation supplying an extensive range of materials to the building and construction markets. Winstone Trading Limited was formed in 1984 and over five years grew to provide national coverage by purchasing a number of smaller businesses including Odlins and Dudding Brothers.

The merger of Fletcher Merchants Limited and Winstone Trading Limited in 1988 produced the largest and only nationwide building materials chain in New Zealand.

=== 1990–2011 ===
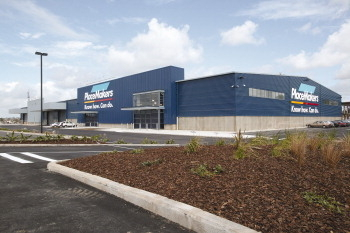
A PlaceMakers store in Mt. Wellington, Auckland

In 1990 PlaceMakers moved towards a scheme of joint venture ownership between Fletcher Distribution Limited and managers of individual operations, while continuing to operate within the PlaceMakers umbrella. Under the joint venture programme selected branch managers were able to become owner-operators. At the end of 1991, eight stores in the PlaceMakers distribution network were operating as joint ventures. By 1993 PlaceMakers had 29 out of their 53 stores operating under the joint venture system.

=== 2011 Christchurch earthquake ===
Following the 6.3-magnitude earthquake that hit the Canterbury region on 22 February 2011, PlaceMakers donated twenty cabins to help with the recovery efforts. The 'Rapid Response Community Shelter' cabins were presented to Mayor Bob Parker by PlaceMakers on 4 March 2011. The cost of the cabins was met by PlaceMakers and a number of suppliers. Most of the cabins were constructed at PlaceMakers' Christchurch Frame & Truss plant keeping local staff employed.

Three PlaceMakers stores were affected directly by the earthquake. Liquefaction affected the Antigua Street and Cranford Street branches.

== Sponsorship and campaigns ==
=== Rugby ===
In 2012 PlaceMakers became community sponsors for all 5 of the New Zealand Super Rugby teams, as well as sponsoring the Sky TV Super Rugby coverage. They also sponsor Hayden Paddon, rally driver.

=== The PlaceMakers Blue Streak ===
The PlaceMakers Blue Streak was launched on 1 September 2012 to support the fundraising efforts of the Prostate Cancer Foundation's Blue September campaign. The partnership between PlaceMakers and the Prostate Cancer Foundation's Blue September is now in its sixth year. While the Blue Streak is entertaining, his role is also to discreetly raise awareness of a sensitive issue. Prostate cancer is the most common cancer among males and accounts for approximately 15% of all male cancer-related deaths, while one in 10 NZ men will get prostate cancer in their lifetime. The Blue Streak is intended to grab the attention of males and their families, and inform them of the underlying health message, which is for males to have regular checks for prostate cancer. PlaceMakers have raised over $1,000,000 for the Prostate Cancer Foundation to date.

The PlaceMakers Blue Streak is noted for not speaking and "streaking" at opportune moments.

=== Motor racing ===
PlaceMakers was previously a title sponsor of the New Zealand round of the Australian V8 Supercars championship at Pukekohe Park Raceway from 2003 to 2007.
