= Five finger =

Five finger is a common name for several plants and may refer to:

- The genus Dasiphora
- The genus Potentilla
- Carambola
- Pseudopanax arboreus, a shrub native to New Zealand
- Pseudopanax colensoi, mountain five-finger
- Tabebuia bahamensis
