= Mangapehi River =

Coordinates: 38°27′S 175°11′E

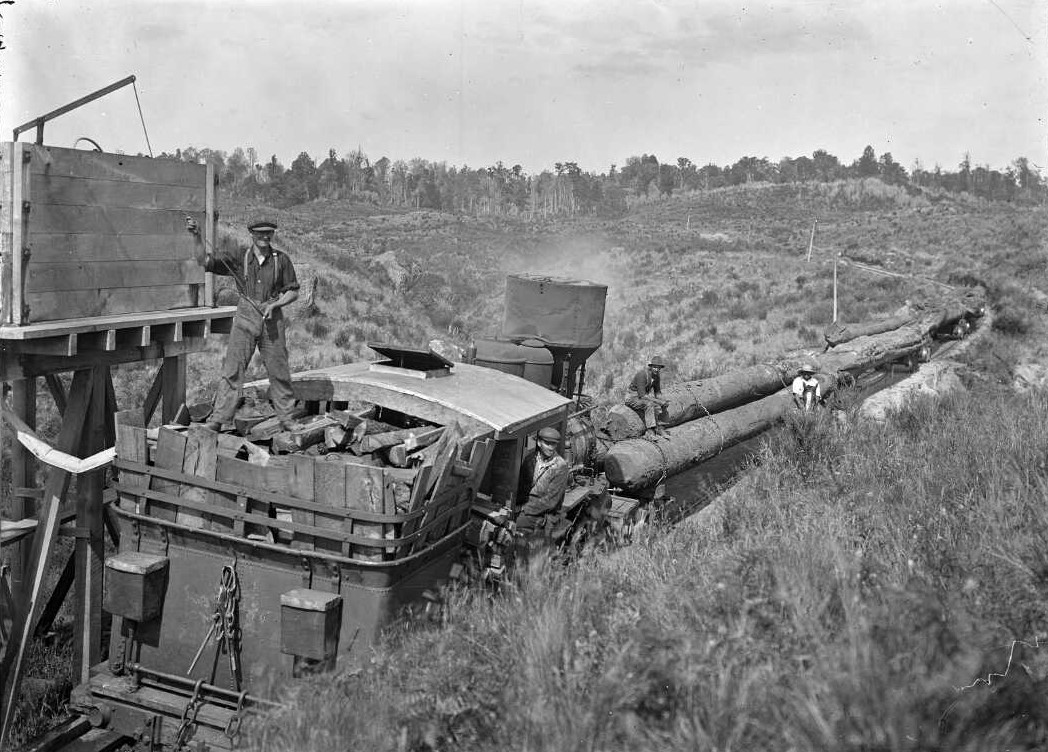
- Climax steam locomotive with a load of logs en route to the Ellis and Burnand sawmill at Mangapehi

Location
- Country: New Zealand

Physical characteristics
- Mouth
  - location: Mokau River
- Length: 25 km (16 mi)

The Mangapehi River is a river of the south Waikato region of New Zealand. It flows northwest from its sources near Benneydale, reaching the Mokau River 10 kilometres (6 mi) southwest of Te Kūiti.

The New Zealand Ministry for Culture and Heritage gives a translation of "stream of trouble" for Mangapēhi.

== See also ==
- List of rivers of New Zealand
