= Weka Pass Railway =

Heritage railway in New Zealand

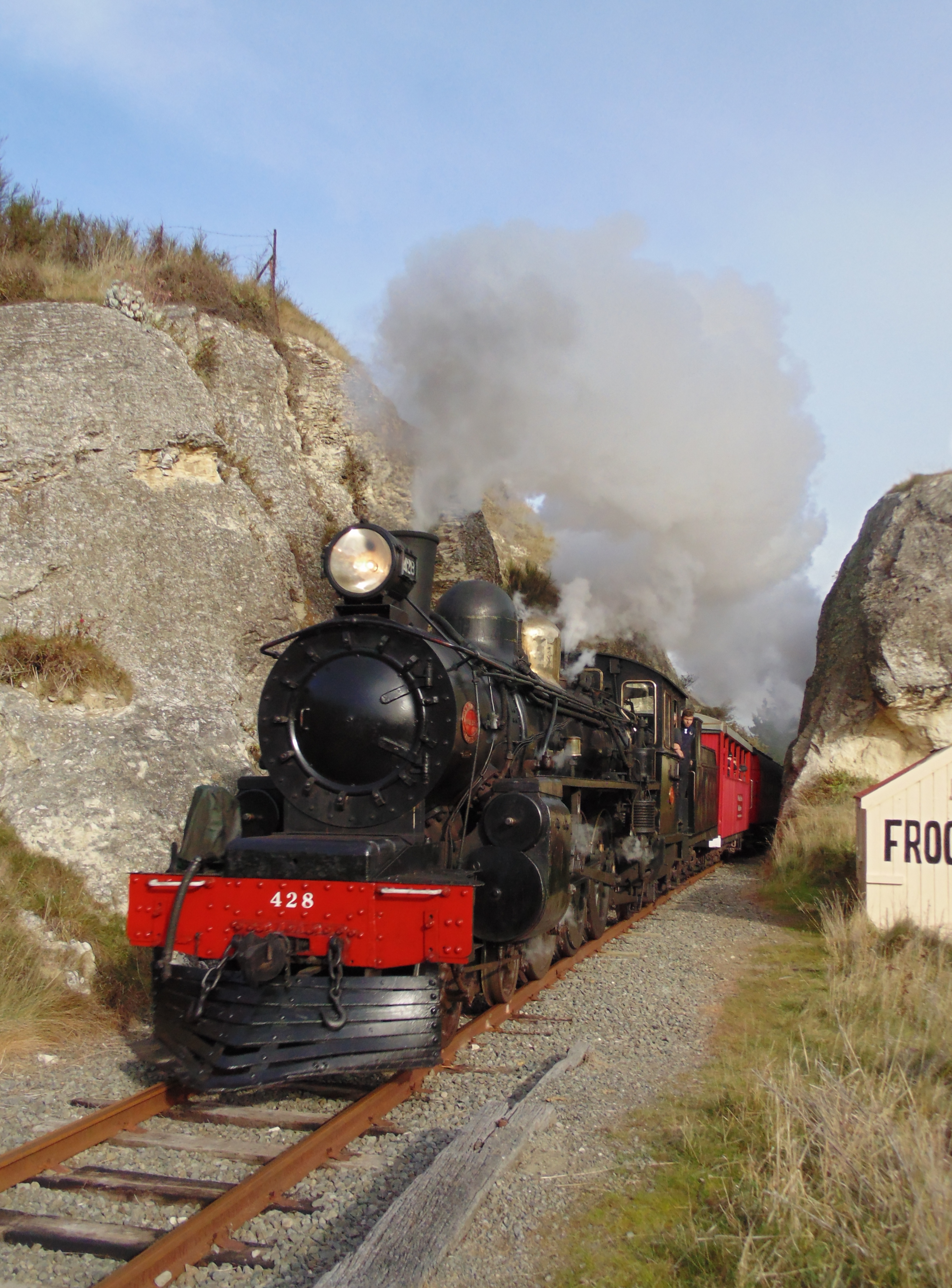
- A 428 just leaving Frog Rock cutting.
- Locale: Waipara, New Zealand
- Terminus: Glenmark Station and Waikari Station
- Coordinates: 43.0544°S 172.7579°E
- Connections: KiwiRail Main North Line

Commercial operations
- Name: Waiau Branchline
- Built by: New Zealand Government Railways
- Original gauge: 1,067 mm (3 ft 6 in)

Preserved operations
- Owned by: Weka Pass Railway Society
- Operated by: Weka Pass Railway Society
- Stations: Two
- Length: 12.8 km (8.0 mi)
- Preserved gauge: 1,067 mm (3 ft 6 in)

Commercial history
- Opened: 15 December 1919
- Closed: 15 January 1978

Preservation history
- 1982: Formation of Society
- 1984: First Operation of Trains
- 1993: Recommissioning of A 428
- 1995: Inaugural Waipara Vintage Festival
- 1999: Official opening of the railway
- 2003: Opening of the Waikari turntable
- 2009: Opening of the Glenmark turntable

Website
- www.wekapassrailway.co.nz

The Weka Pass Railway is a New Zealand heritage railway based in Waipara, North Canterbury. It is operated on a 12.8 km (8 mi) length of the former Waiau Branch railway between Waipara and Waikari. The railway is operated by an incorporated society which consists solely of members and volunteers, and are largely resident in the city of Christchurch, 60 km (37 mi) to the south. The railway began carrying passengers in 1984 and is now well established locally and nationally.

== History ==
=== Beginnings ===
The first stage of the Waiau Branch line inland through the Weka Pass to Waikari was completed in 1882. This area is noted for its scenery and the railway passes through many large cuttings, around tight curves and on steep gradients (max 1 in 47). When originally built the line was expected to be part of the South Island Main Trunk Railway north of the city of Christchurch. Further sections of the line through Hawarden, Medbury, Balmoral, Pahau, Culverden, Achray, Rotherham and Waiau were constructed in subsequent years. The line was officially opened to Medbury in 1884 and to Culverden in 1886, but the final section to Waiau was not completed until 1919. In the 1920's the decision was made to take the Main North Line on a coastal route north out of Waipara. The Main North Line, which involved major earthworks and many engineering difficulties, was not completed until 1945.

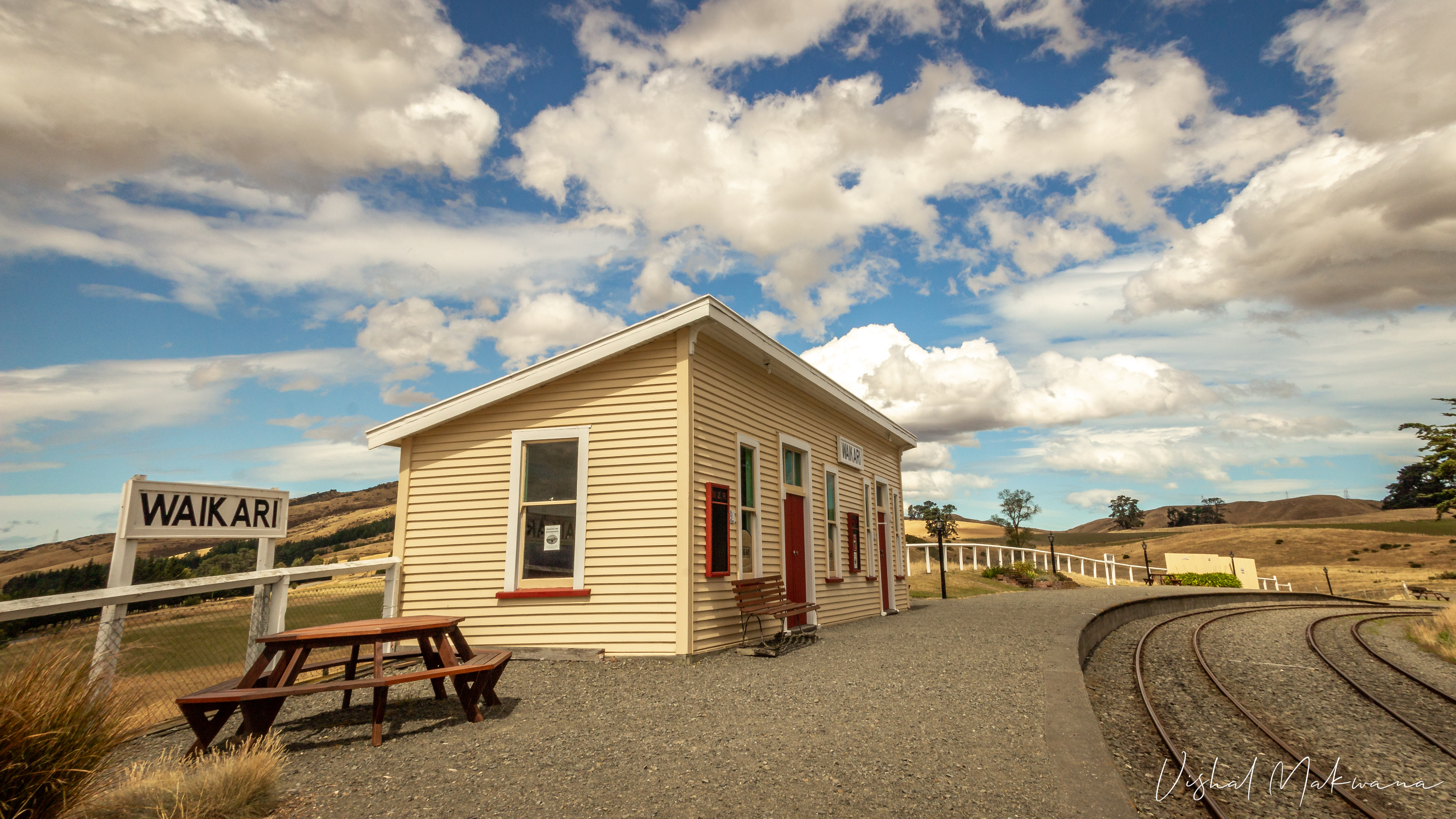
Weka Pass Railway Station, Waikari, New Zealand

The Waiau Branch suffered the fate of many rural branch lines in later years as increasing competition from road transport saw a decline in traffic carried. For many years, the railways were protected from this competition by mileage limits; as these were gradually increased, more and more branches were closed down. The branch line had a short reprieve in its twilight years when large amounts of logs were carried from the Balmoral forest. Closure occurred on 15 January 1978.

=== Formation ===
A public meeting at Waipara in August 1982 saw a steering committee established to investigate the Weka Pass Railway proposal. There had been interest from a number of people in preserving part of this old branch line particularly in the scenic Weka Pass. The impetus came from local Waipara people who saw the tourist potential, and railway enthusiasts, many drawn from the Ferrymead Railway. An incorporated society, Weka Pass Railway Incorporated, was formally established in November that year, and formally registered on 25 March 1983. The new group began negotiating with New Zealand Railways Corporation and other parties to purchase track, locomotives, rolling stock and other facilities. In May 1983, the first major public event was held. The "Mayfair Festival" was held and featured the Canterbury Railway Societys Manning Wardle No. 1841 of 1914, and Fowler No. 16246 of 1924 from the Canterbury Steam Preservation Society, along with rakes of LA and LC "high-side" wagons, full of passengers. Shuttles ran from the old Waipara yard to the 3 km straight.

In July 1983, the railway agreed with the New Zealand Railways Corporation to lease the line between Waipara and the south bank of the Hurunui River. Public running commenced on 4 June 1984, and travelled from McCaskeys Level Crossing to Herberts Level Crossing (and stopped for picnics at Frog Rock along the way). The WPR purchased the leased section of the line on 3 September 1984, and the final payment was made on 28 August 1990. On 30 September 1984, running on the line ceased due to legal complications about the transfer of the ownership. The railway was later granted permission to operate trains under their own name on the line, a public running recommenced on 17 March 1985.

Following the closure the Waiau line, all of the track remained in place except for the removal of a level crossing at Waikari where the road crossed State Highway 7 due to Transit New Zealand and the National Roads Board refusing for the crossing to be reinstalled. Because of this, in September 1988, the WPR agreed to lift the line between Waikari and the south bank of the Hurunui River, and section was finally lifted by July 1991.

== Track and turntables ==
=== Track ===
The Weka Pass Railway operates 12.8 km (8.0 mi) of the former Waiau Branch Line between Waipara and its terminus at Waikari.

Not long after trains commenced running to Waikari, the railway suffered a major setback in 1986 when heavy rain damaged the line in a number of places. During this time, it was decided that the line wasn't in good condition, and it would need extensive repairs, and earthworks in some portion of line. By April 1987, trains were running to the 5.5 km (3.4 mi) peg. Due to a slump near Antils Hut found in September 1987, trains were once again restricted. After repairs were made, trains recommenced running to the area on 28 January 1988. During this time, the section of track between the old Waipara yard and Glenmark Station were realigned. In the same year, work started in Waikari with the ripping up of track.

On 3 June 1990, trains started operating to Gate No. 2. Trains then started operating to Frog Rock in June 1991, and to Herberts Crossing on 23 August 1992. The line later reached Timpendean, but due to the lack of a suitable picnic area, trains were only allowed to run to Herberts Level Crossing. On 11 September 1999 was marked as a historical day for the WPR, as it was the day for the grand opening of the new line to Waikari, and also the official opening day of the WPR. A "members train" was hauled by D^{G}s 770 and 791 and travelled all the way to Waikari, and after dropping the members off at the platform, the train was propelled back, where the D^{G}s were placed into the turntable road, and F 163 sat in the loop with the "members train". A "special guest train", which was hauled by A 428, followed soon after. W^{D} 357 sat at the end of the line at the stop block. In 2001, a new turn-out was installed in the yard in Waipara.

=== Turntables ===
The railway has a turntable at both Glenmark and Waikari. A 55-foot (17 m) turntable was installed in Waikari on 3 October 2002, and was recommissioned on 31 August 2003. A special train ran from Christchurch hauled by DCP 4761, as well as another train, which was hauled by A 428 and composed of the railway's own carriages. The turntable was found in a scrap heap in Middleton Yard (in Christchurch), and was purchased by the railway in the mid-1990's. A 62-foot (19 m) turntable was installed in Glenmark (Waipara). It took 14 months for the turntable to be restored and installed, and was reopened on 12 July 2009. There were issues with the installation with the turntable, as the land was privately owned at the time. This now enables the locomotives to be turned to face the correct way, instead of running tender-leading on the return journey to Glenmark from Waikari. In 2010, the railway won the "KiwiRail Network Infrastructure Improvement Undertaken by a Heritage Railway Award" for the restorations of the two turntables.

== Buildings ==
=== Stations ===
==== Glenmark Station ====
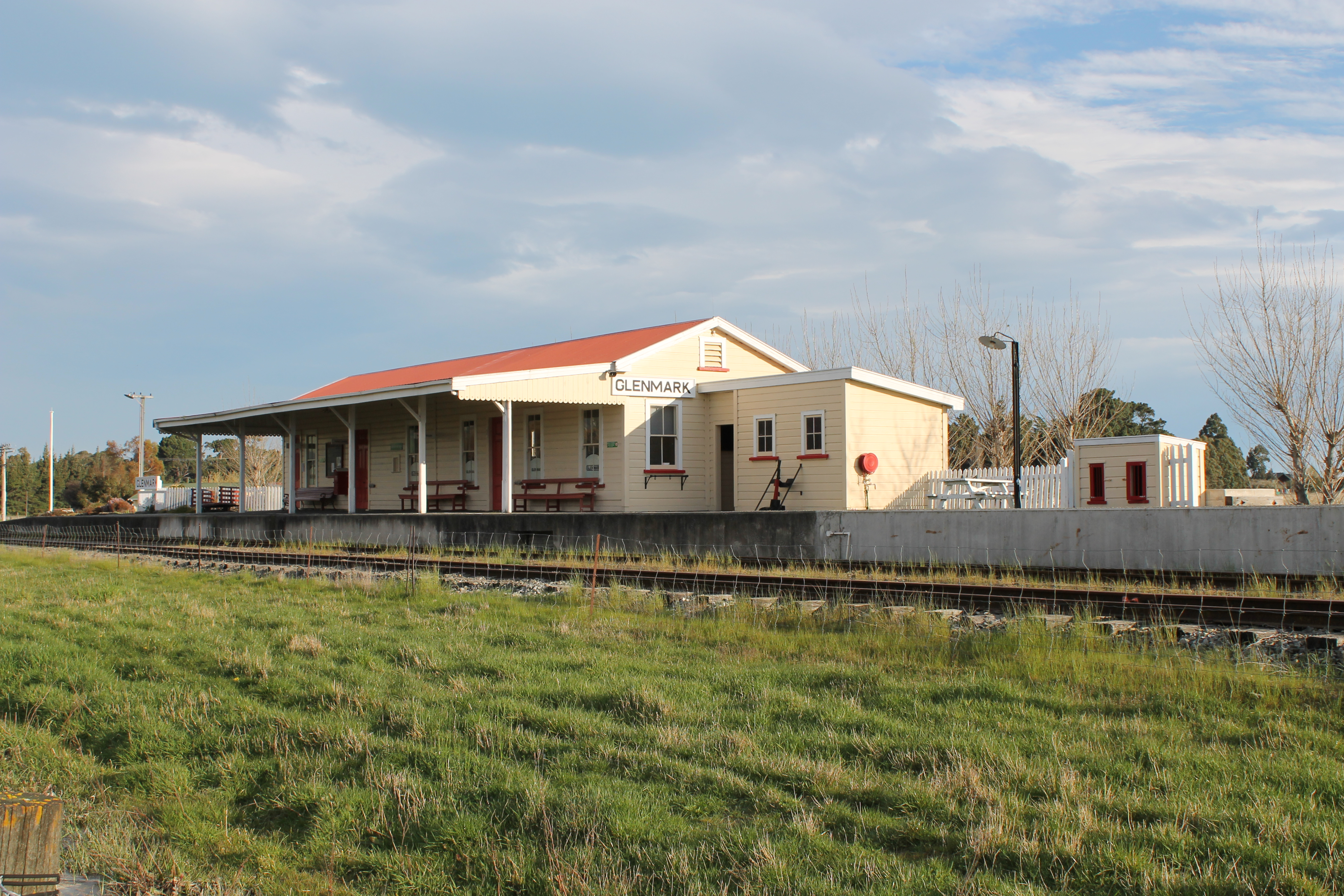
Glenmark Station in Waipara

The ex-Mina Railway Station was built in 1910, and served many passenger trains along the Main North Line, and had been extensively refurbished. By 1979, a new concrete front was needed to support the platform. In October 1980, the railway station became an unattended flag station, and was closed to all traffic. A private resident and his family, who was living in Cheviot at the time, raised funds and made generous donations to preserve and transport the station to Waipara. In 1986 disassemble of the station commenced, and the station arrived in its current site in 1987. The building was shifted in two sections, and after rejoining the two sections, a new roof was constructed, and new foundations made. A verandah was also fitted, and the station has been in use since April 1988. To avoid confusion, the station was renamed as Glenmark Station, to avoid confusion of the current Waipara Station on the Main North Line.

==== Waikari Station ====
The ex-Hundalee Station was built in 1939, and is a standard class A station (which were designed by George Troup). The station also served many passenger trains along the Main North Line. The building was purchased by the WPR, and was transported to Waikari on 29 October 1991. By July 1992, the station was fully restored, and served its first train in Waikari on 11 September 1999.

In 1995, the railway received an award from the Railway Heritage Trust of New Zealand for the restoration of the two stations.

=== Locomotive depot and workshop ===
In the mid 1980's, a two-road workshop was built in the old Waipara railway yard. The depot was later extended to a three-road depot in 2005, and a pit was installed.

=== Carriage Shed ===
Between 2005 and 2006, a two-road carriage shed was built, and was fitted with roller doors. It houses the WPR's carriage fleet, Wickham Track Inspection Car and one or both D^{G}s. During mid-2012, the shed was fitted with four swinging doors.

=== Gate Huts ===
Because of the railway running through private farmland, Gate Keepers are assigned to Gates Nos. 1 and 2. Because of this, a hut is allocated to both gates.

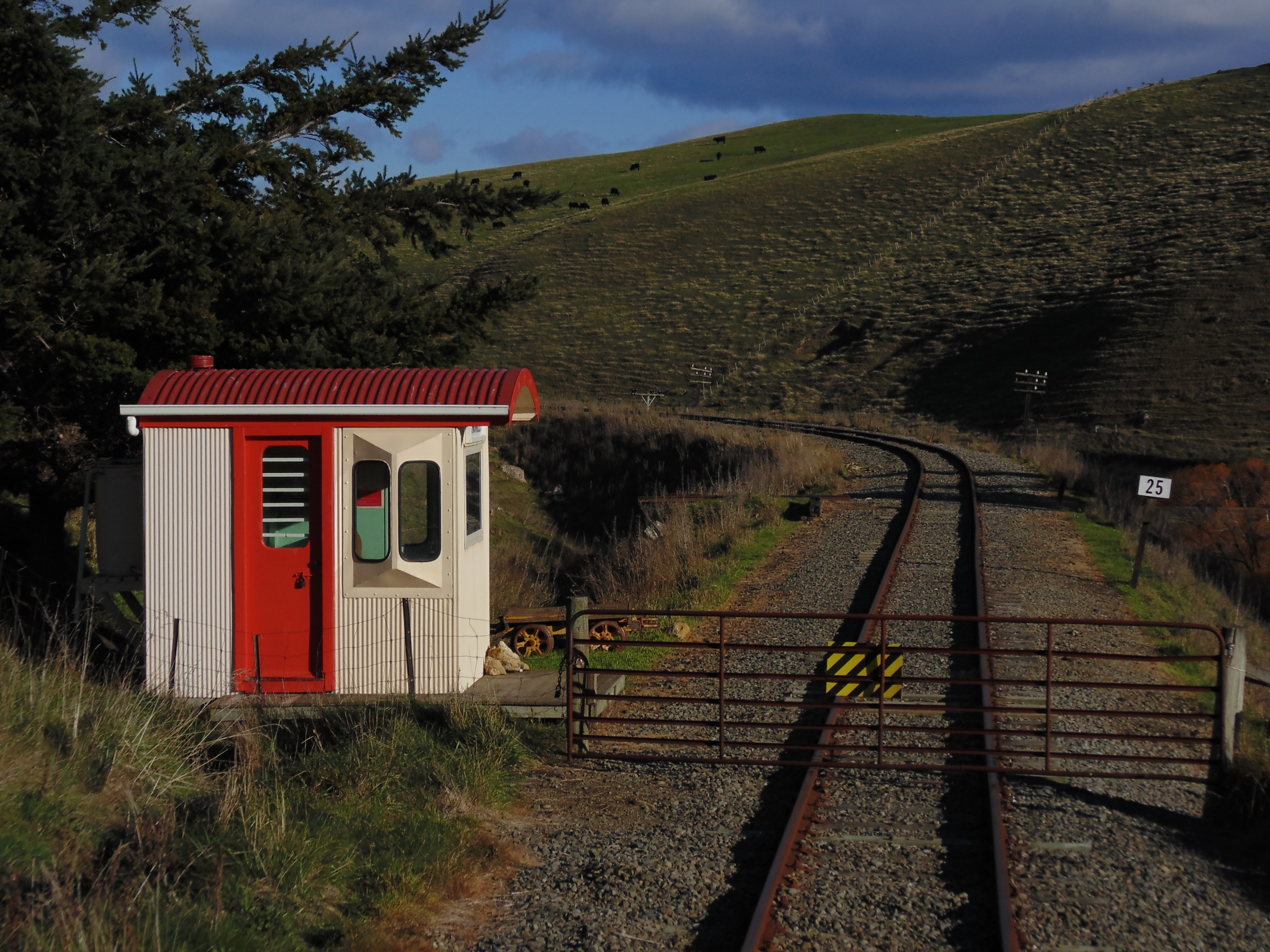
Gate No. 2 on the Weka Pass Railway

During the mid to late 1980's, phone-booth huts were built. But because of the small size of them, the ex-pump-house from the former Kaiapoi rail yard was transported to Gate No. 1, and the ex-Hawarden Gangers hut was transported to Gate No. 2, to replace the phone-booth like-huts. On 8 July 2004, two new brand new huts (which were built in the WPR's yard in Waipara) replaced the second-hand huts (which have since been demolished). The new huts have been named after two late members respectfully.

== Locomotives and rolling stock ==
The railway presently owns four locomotives, all formerly owned by the New Zealand Government Railways, and a large fleet of ex-NZR rolling stock.

=== NZR steam locomotives ===
Key:	In service	In service, Mainline Certified	Under overhaul/restoration/repair	Stored	Static display	Scrapped

Original class and number	Builder	Builders number	Year built	Year arrived	Notes
A 428	A & G Price	31	1909	1983	Purchased by the A 428 Preservation Society in 1973 and leased to the W.P.R. in 1983. Restored in September 1993, 428 has been in active service ever since, only being withdrawn for necessary repairs when required. The locomotive ever since has gone to the WPR ownership. A428 is currently awaiting 10yr boiler inspection and overhaul after 30 years.

=== NZR diesel locomotives ===
Key:	In service	In service, Mainline Certified	Under overhaul/restoration/repair	Stored	Static display	Scrapped

Original class and number	TMS number	Builder	Builders number	Year built	Year arrived	Notes
D^{E} 512	DE 1429	English Electric	1750	1951	2015	This locomotive is owned by the Diesel Traction Group, and on long-term loan to the WPR for work trains and general shunting duties.
D^{G} 770	DG 2232	English Electric	2274/D353	1955	1983	D^{G} 770 was purchased by the WPR in 1983. This locomotive is operational, and is used on passenger services.
D^{G} 791	DG 2468	English Electric	2295/D374	1955	1983	D^{G} 791 was purchased by the WPR in 1983. This locomotive is operational, and is used on passenger services.
D^{SA} 276	DSA 822	Mitsubishi Heavy Industries	1471	1967	1992	D^{SA} 276 was owned by Rail Base Systems and leased to the WPR in 1992 until being subsequently purchased. The locomotive is undergoing an engine overhaul

=== Carriages ===
Key:	In service	In service, Mainline Certified	Under overhaul/restoration/repair	Stored	Static display	Scrapped

Original class and number	TMS number	Builder	Type	Year built	Year arrived	Notes
A 523		NZR Addington Workshops	43 ft 9 in (13.34 m) wooden body passenger carriage	1896	1986	Purchased from the West Coast Historical and Mechanical Society at Shantytown. Used as a bunkhouse for members. It is the oldest piece of rolling stock held by the railway.
A 1720	A 50084; XPC 588	NZR Addington Workshops	50 ft 0 in (15.24 m) steel-panelled mainline coach	1931	2020	Purchased from Dunedin Railways in November 2019.
A 1730	A 50132	NZR Addington Workshops	50 ft 0 in (15.24 m) steel-panelled suburban carriage	1931	1983	Ex-Dunedin suburban services. Overhauled from 2012 to 2018.
A 1731	A 50140	NZR Addington Workshops	50 ft 0 in (15.24 m) steel-panelled mainline coach	1931	1983	Ex-Dunedin suburban services. Overhauled from 2004 to 2011. Entered service on 1 May 2011. In 2012, it won the "FRONZ Passenger Carriage Restoration Award".
A 1732	A 50159	NZR Addington Workshops	50 ft 0 in (15.24 m) steel-panelled suburban carriage	1931	2009	Ex-Dunedin suburban services. Purchased from the Otago Excursion Train Trust. Stored, awaiting restoration.
A 1733	A 50167	NZR Addington Workshops	50 ft 0 in (15.24 m) steel-panelled suburban carriage	1931	1983	Ex-Dunedin suburban services. Now undergoing overhaul.
A 1760	A 50223	NZR Addington Workshops	50 ft 0 in (15.24 m) steel-panelled suburban carriage	1932	2008	Ex-Dunedin suburban services. Purchased from the Otago Excursion Train Trust. Stored, awaiting restoration.
A^{L} 1697	AL 50026	NZR Addington Workshops	50 ft 0 in (15.24 m) steel-panelled suburban carriage	1930	1983	Ex-Dunedin suburban services. Rebuilt as a car-van in October 1969. Restored from 1990 – 1993. Underwent repairs and a tidy-up from December 2017 to March 2019.
A 1935	A 3338 AC 3548	NZR Addington Workshops	56 ft 0 in (17.07 m) steel-panelled mainline carriage	1939	2001	Currently in storage

=== Viewing cars ===
Key:	In service	In service, Mainline Certified	Under overhaul/restoration/repair	Stored	Static display	Scrapped

Original class and number	TMS number	Builder	Type	Year built	Year arrived	Notes
T 155	T 385	NZR Addington Workshops	32 ft 6 in (9.91 m) wooden covered viewing car	c1960	1981	Formerly a cattle wagon. Modified as a covered viewing car and reclassified as A^{T} 155 in 1988.
T 157	T 409	NZR Addington Workshops	32 ft 6 in (9.91 m) wooden open viewing car	c1960	1984	Formerly a cattle wagon. It was renumbered as T 385 circa 1978, and withdrawn on 7 November 1981 in Waipara. Modified as an un-covered viewing car and reclassified as A^{T} 157 in September 1993.

=== Brake Vans ===
Key:	In service	In service, Mainline Certified	Under overhaul/restoration/repair	Stored	Static display	Scrapped

Original class and number	TMS number	Builder	Type	Year built	Year arrived	Notes
F 497	F 962	NZR Hillside Workshops	47 ft 6 in (14.48 m) wooden body brake van	1927	1985	Arrived in April 1985 after being donated by a member. It was restored from 1997–1998.
F 699	F 2854	NZR Addington Workshops	37 ft 6 in (11.43 m) wooden body brake van	1964	1987	Sold in April 1987. F 699 was restored in 1994, and is one of the last wooden vans built by the NZR.

=== Wagons ===
Key:	In service	In service, Mainline Certified	Under overhaul/restoration	Stored	Static display	Scrapped

Original class and number	TMS number	Type	Builder	Year built	Year arrived	Notes
E 2882	E 1344	Four-wheel steel open high sided wagon	NZR Hillside Workshops	1908	1983	Originally built as L^{A} 8337. Stored, awaiting restoration.
E^{A} 1664	EA 65	50 ft (15 m) Covered wooded bogie wagon	NZR Addington Workshops	1935	1987	Originally built as Z 262. Modified with a mess room and a tool storage room in early 1987. Refurbished and re-roofed in 2014. Used on work trains to transport the track gang to work sites along the line.
E^{UB} 4164	EA 2662	Bogie crane support wagon	NZR Addington Workshops	1926	1989	Originally entered service as U^{B} 818. Crane support and runner wagon for Diesel Crane N^{O}.197.
H 1557	H 1125	Four wheel cattle wagon	Hurst Nelson (assembled at Addington Workshops)	1959	1981	Restored in 1998, and officially recommissioned in April 2000.
J^{C} 4971	JC 487	4 wheel sheep wagon	NZR Addington Workshops	c1952	1989	Formerly preserved by the now-defunct Southern Rail Group at Prebbleton. Restored in 1999, and officially recommissioned in April 2000.
Unidentified K^{P}	Unidentified KP	4 Wheel Box Wagon	Mitsubishi Heavy Industries	N/A	1991	Sold to the railway in May 1991 and used as a storage shed without wheels.
K^{S} 4556	KS 12345	4-wheel steel covered wagon	NZR Addington Workshops	1970	2000	Owned by the Rail Heritage Trust. Currently incorrectly stenciled KS 1235.
K^{S} 4479	KS 11507 KST 5069	4-wheel curtain sided wagon	NZR Otahuhu Workshops	1970	2000	Owned by the Rail Heritage Trust.
L^{A} 20341		4-wheel open high-sider	NZR Otahuhu Workshops	1941	c1995	Stored, awaiting restoration.
L^{A} 21338	LA 39170	4-wheel open high-sider	NZR Addington Workshops	c1950	1986	
L^{C} 25542	LC 1588	4-wheel steel open high side wagon	NZR Otahuhu Workshops	1950	1990	
L^{PA} 1193	LPA 2730	4-wheel steel high side paper wagon	Mitsubishi Heavy Industries (assembled at Otahuhu Workshops)	1973	2001	Owned by the Rail Heritage Trust.
M^{C} 2386	MC 4830	4 wheel wooden open low side wagon	NZR Addington Workshops	1959	1987	Overhauled in 1999, and received a tidy-up from May to July 2018.
	NK 385	4-wheel steel flat-top wagon	NZR Hillside Workshops	1985	2000	Owned by the Rail Heritage Trust.
T 168	T 492	Bogie cattle wagon	NZR Hillside Workshops	1960	1984	Stored body-less, awaiting restoration.
U^{B} 618	UB 228	Bogie steel flat deck wagon	NZR Newmarket Workshops	1908	1983	Oldest freight wagon owned by the Weka Pass Railway.
U^{C} 860	UC 594	Bogie tank wagon	NZR Addington Workshops	1930	2000	Owned by the Rail Heritage Trust. Stored awaiting restoration.
U^{C} 1232	UC 1472	Bogie tank wagon	NZR Addington Workshops	1947	2001	Owned by the Rail Heritage Trust.
U^{D} 1504	UD 61 EWW 46	Bogie Works and Way Well wagon	NZR Otahuhu Workshops	1952	2000	Owned by the Rail Heritage Trust. Used on KiwiRail work trains if required.
U^{R} 2275	URT 304	Steel flat deck bogie log wagon	NZR Addington Workshops	1965	1989	Used on work trains.
V^{R} 137	VR 1399	Bogie Steel Insulated wagon	Kinki Sharyo Co. (assembled at Otahuhu Workshops)	1964	1983	
X^{P} 3226	XP 2754	4-Wheel Ventilated Box Wagon	NZR East Town Workshops	1967	1983	Restored in 1999, and officially recommissioned in April 2000.
Y^{B} 578	YB 1247	4-wheel ballast wagon	NZR Hillside Workshops	1942	N/A	
Y^{B} 621	YB 1656	4-wheel ballast wagon	NZR Hillside Workshops	1942	N/A	
Y^{B} 634	YB 1783	4-wheel ballast wagon	NZR Hillside Workshops	1942	N/A	
Y^{B} 637	YB 1817	4-wheel ballast wagon	NZR Hillside Workshops	1942	N/A	
Y^{C} 838	YC 1716	4-wheel central-discharging ballast wagon	NZR Addington Workshops	1960	2007	Owned by the Rail Heritage Trust.
Y^{C} 856	YC 1906	4-wheel central-discharging ballast wagon	NZR Addington Workshops	1960	2007	Owned by the Rail Heritage Trust. Occasionally used on work trains.
Y^{D} 1035	YD 392	Bogie side-dump wagon	Differential Car Company	c1950	2013	Occasionally used on work trains.
Y^{F} 909	YF 132	4-wheel side discharge ballast wagon	NZR Addington Workshops	1964	2007	Occasionally used on work trains.
Y^{F} 916	YF 201	4-wheel side discharge ballast wagon	NZR Addington Workshops	1965	2001	Owned by the Rail Heritage Trust. Incorrectly stenciled Y^{F} 203.
Z 356	Z 1032	50 ft (15 m) Covered wooden bogie wagon	NZR Otahuhu Workshops	1946	1989	Under restoration.

=== Cranes ===
Key:	In service	In service, Mainline Certified	Under overhaul/restoration	Stored	Static display	Scrapped

Number	TMS class and number	Type	Lifting capacity	Builder	Builders number	Year built	Year arrived	Notes
197	EL 1007	Diesel	10 tonnes (9.8 long tons; 11 short tons)	Ransomes & Rapier	F5637	1943	1989	Entered service in 1943, and was the NZR's first diesel crane. It was not permitted to travel on the Rewanui or Paparoa Inclines. It was renumbered as EL 1007 on 23 July 1979. It was withdrawn in 1989, and arrived at the WPR on 30 May in that year. It was repainted in 2016.
305		Coaling	500 kilograms (1,100 lb)	N/A	N/A	1925	N/A	Entered service for the NZR in 1925 as Crane 359. It was purchased by the WPR and restored in 1998, where it was used for coaling A 428. Now currently stored awaiting an overhaul.

=== Track inspection cars ===
Key:	In service	In service, Mainline Certified	Under overhaul/restoration/repair	Stored	Static display	Scrapped

Class	Number	Builder	Builders number	Year built	Year arrived	Notes
W^{W}	5139	Wickham Of Ware	5164	1950	1984	The ex-South Island Wickham Track Inspection Car entered service for the NZR in 1950. It was withdrawn and sold to the WPR in June 1984, and restored by Cooper Hendersons Motors in 1985. In 1995, the interior of the car was refurbished. In 1997, it was given an overhaul of its Austin A40 petrol engine. But the engine was replaced by a Datson 120Y petrol engine in 2002, and also had a new Nissan gear-box fitted. It also received an overhaul of its axles.

== Gallery ==
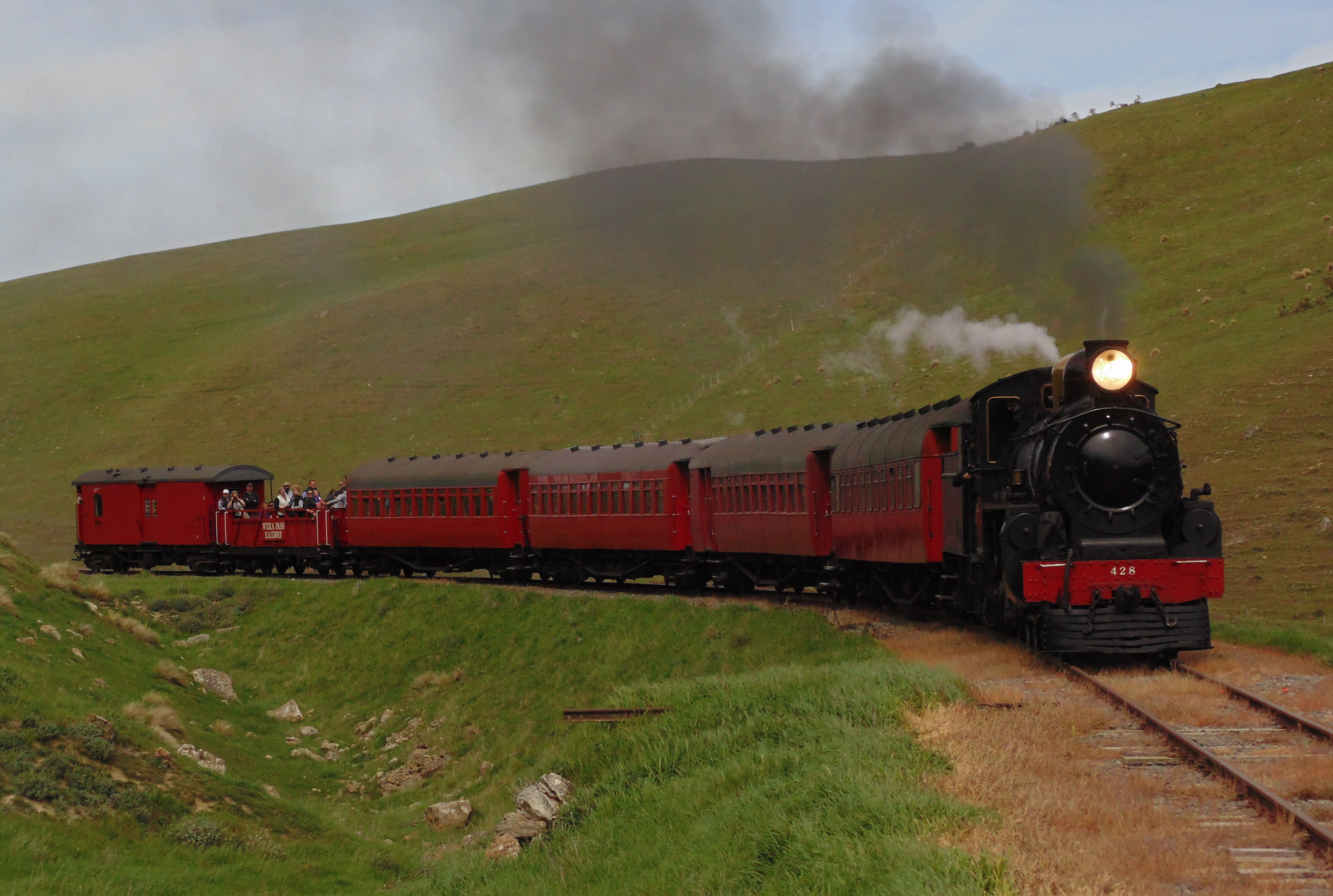
NZR A class No. 428 approaching Gate 2 on the railway

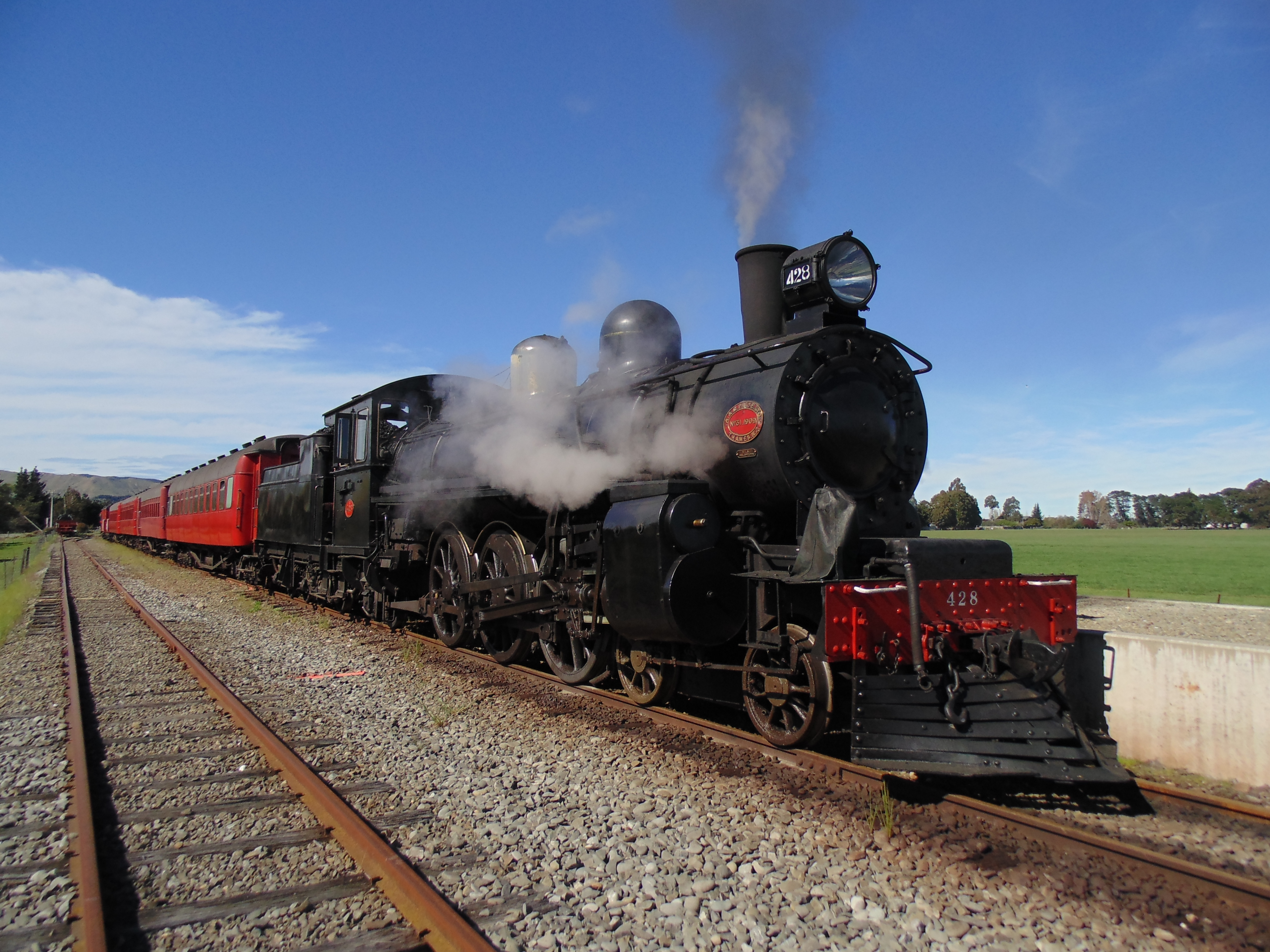
A 428 at Glenmark Station.

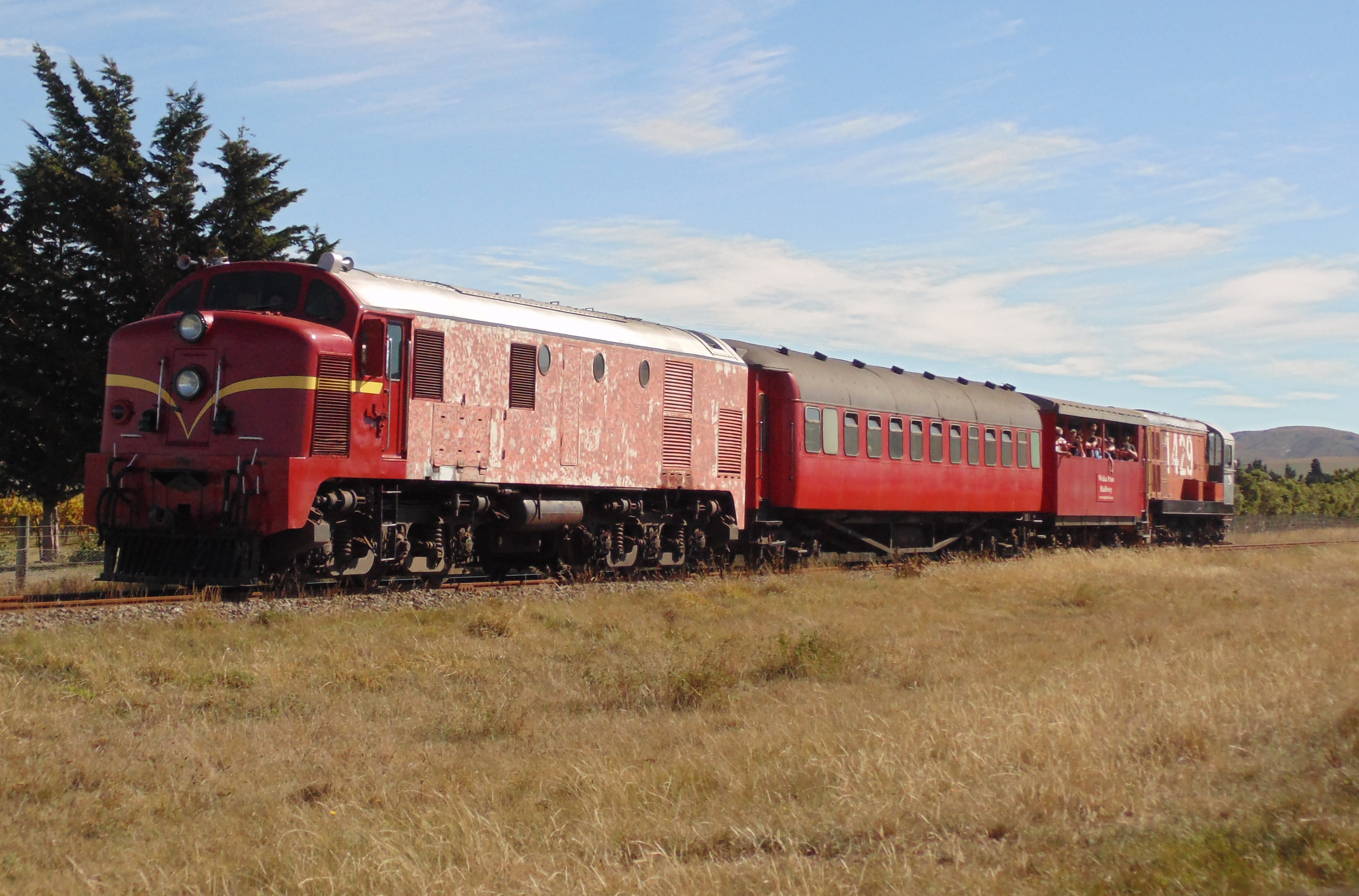
D^{G} 791 and DE 1429 with a shuttle train during the 2016 Waipara Vintage Festival.

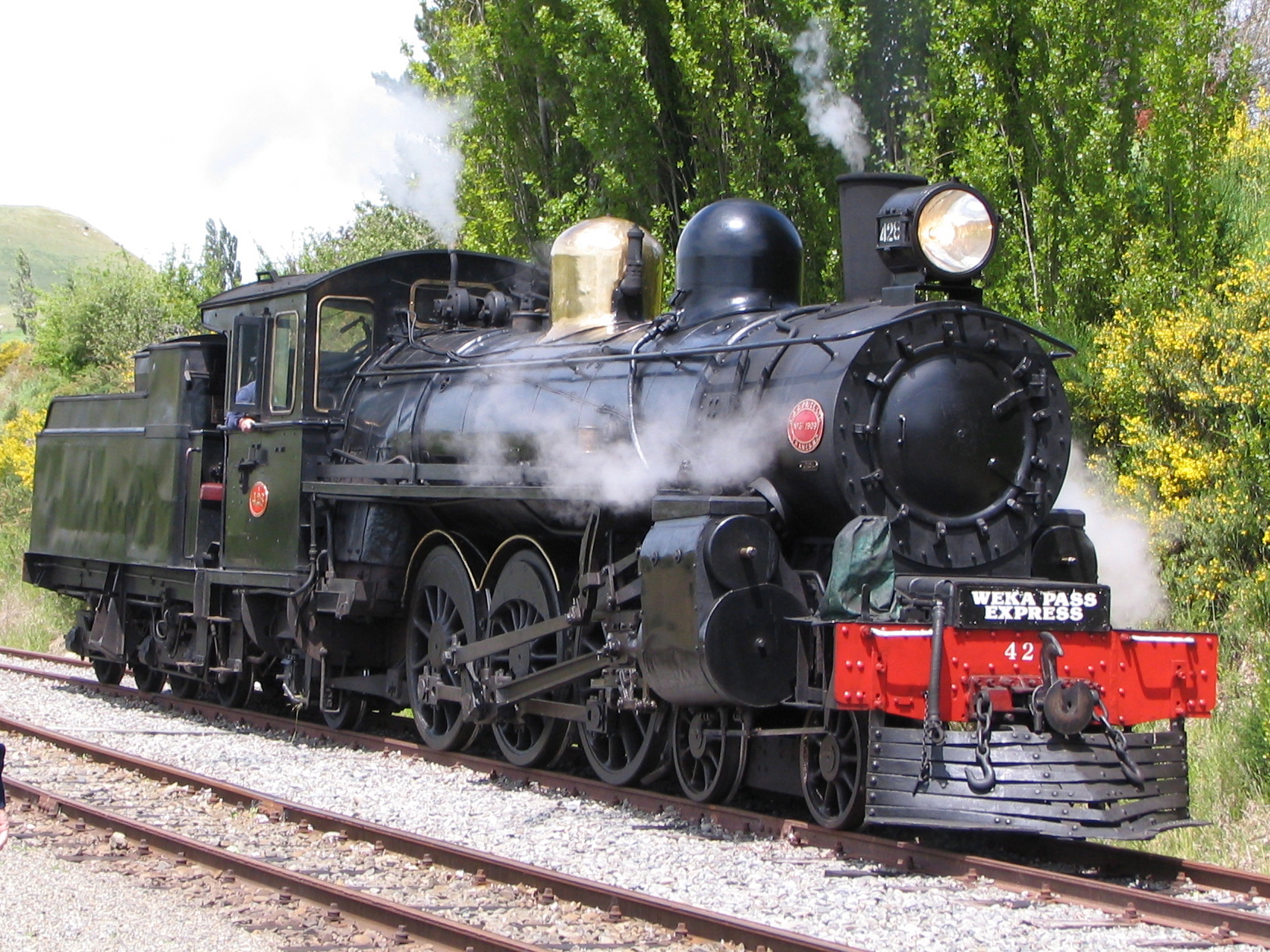
A 428 in Waikari.

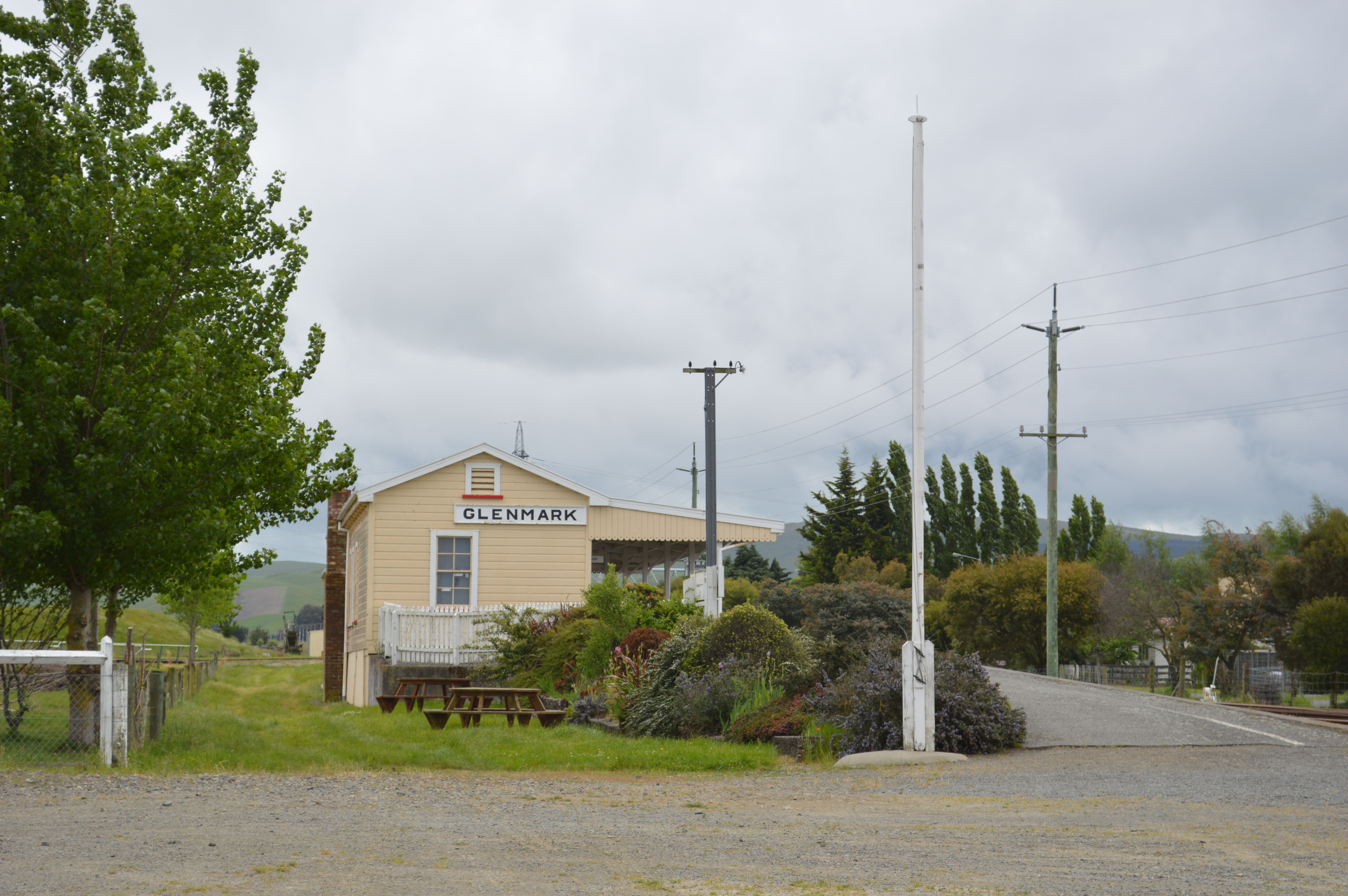
Glenmark Station.

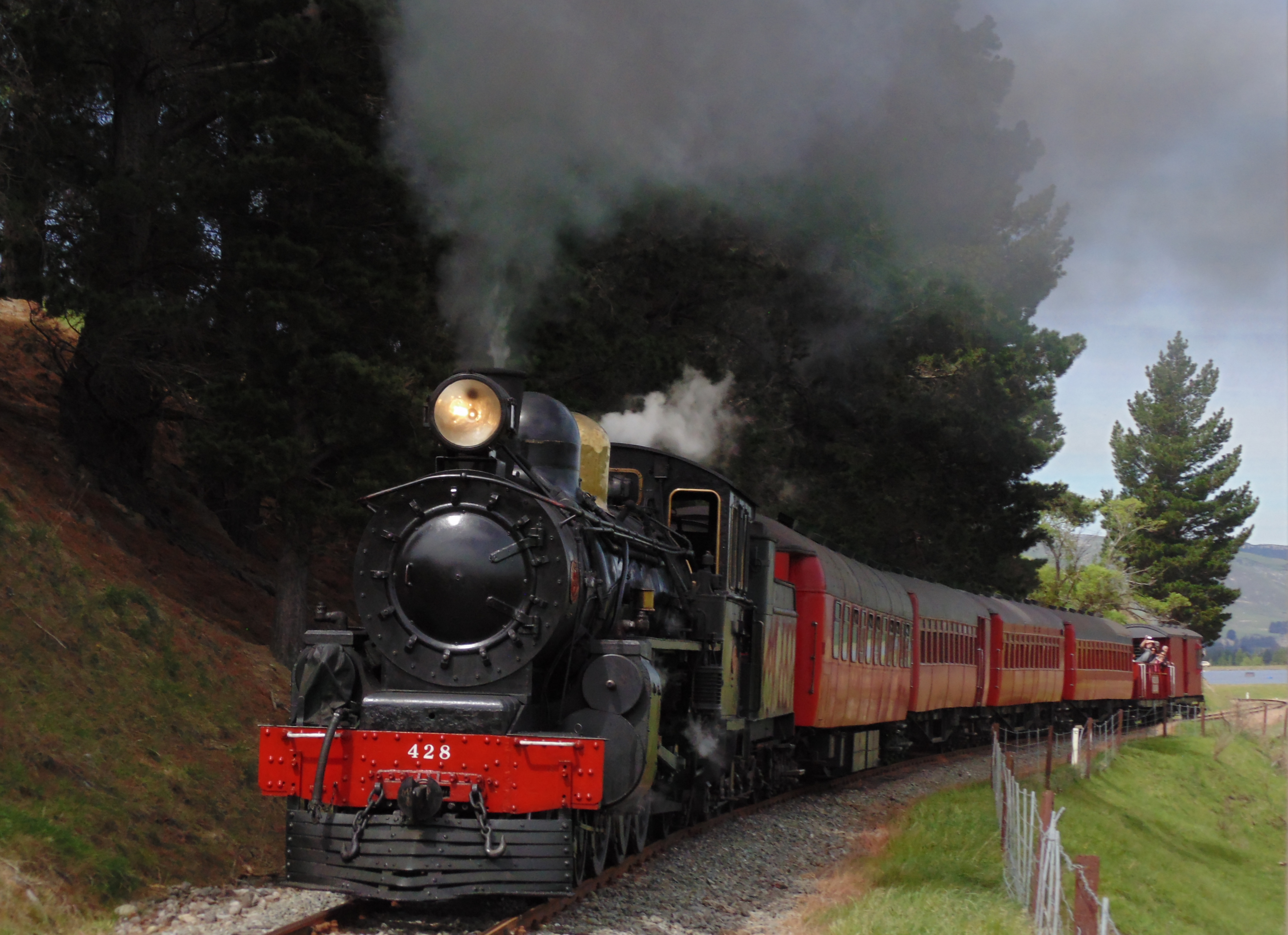
A 428 about to pass Gate No. 1.

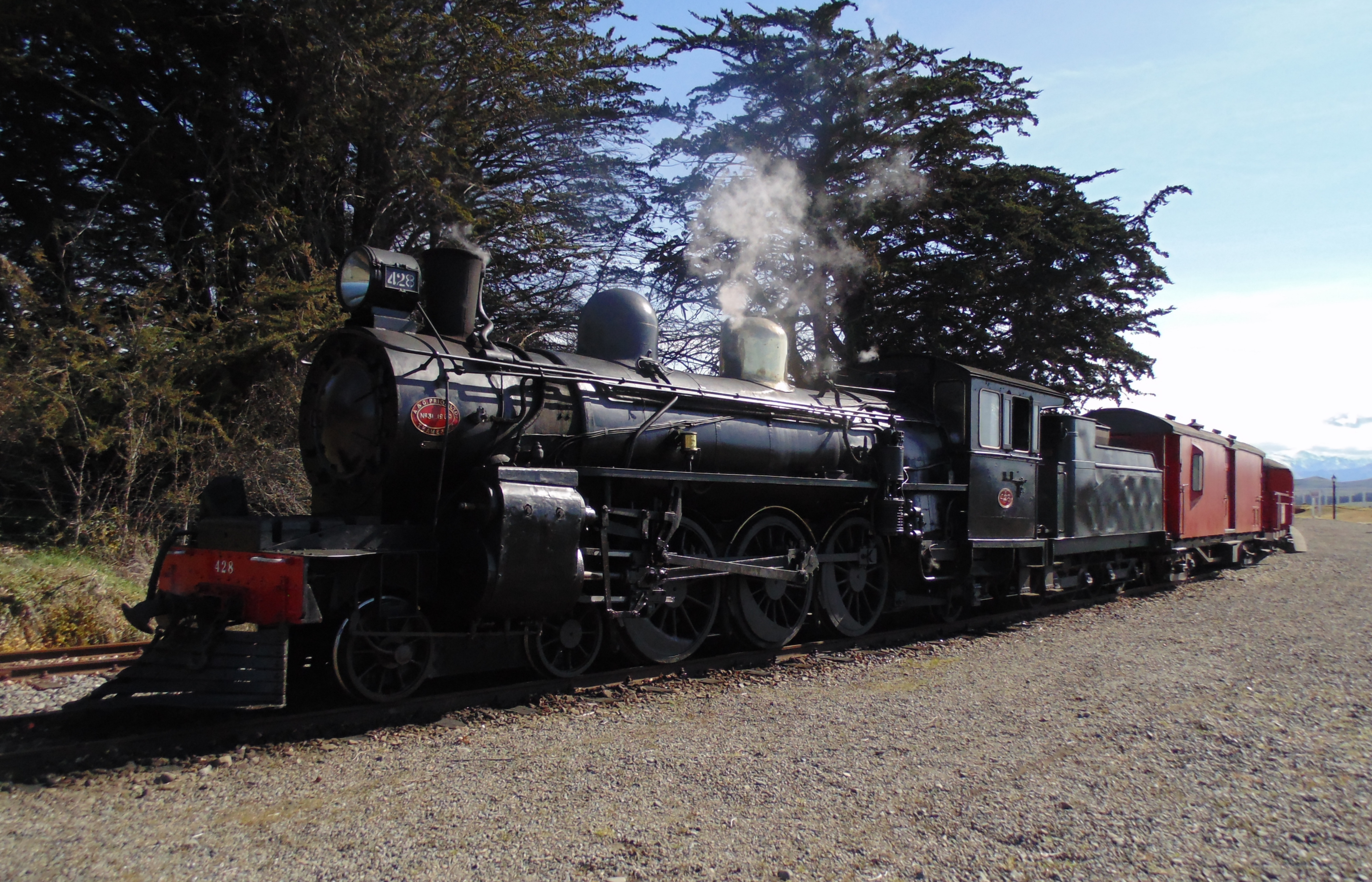
A 428 awaiting departure from Waikari
