= Manunui railway station =

Railway station in New Zealand

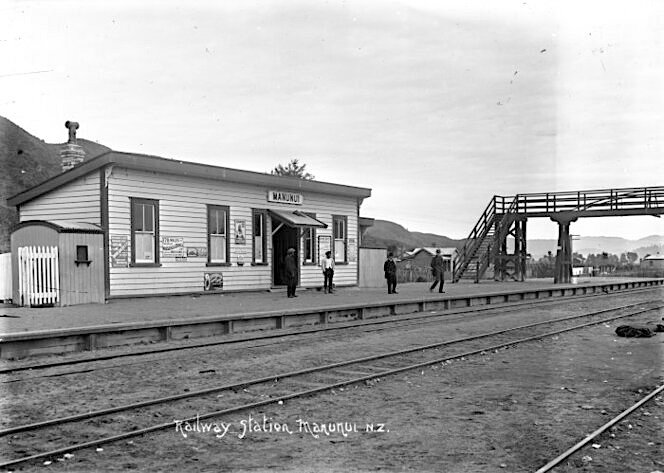
- Railway Station, Manunui between 1904 and 1923

General information
- Location: New Zealand
- Coordinates: 38.8911°S 175.3271°E
- Elevation: 191 m (627 ft)
- Line: North Island Main Trunk
- Distance: Wellington 391.9 km (243.5 mi)

History
- Opened: 2 September 1904
- Closed: 31 January 1982
- Electrified: June 1988

Services
Preceding station	Historical railways	Following station
Matapuna; Line open, station closed	North Island Main Trunk; KiwiRail	Piriaka; Line open, station closed
Location

Manunui station was on the North Island Main Trunk line, in the Ruapehu District of New Zealand, serving Manunui. It was 2.9 km (1.8 mi) south east of Matapuna and 4.63 km (2.88 mi) north of Piriaka. Freight was handled from 2 September 1904, though it wasn't until 16 September 1908 that it was listed as having a station yard, formation and fencing and 10 November 1908, when it was described as a 6th class station, with passenger platform, urinals, cart approach, a 30 ft (9.1 m) x 20 ft (6.1 m) goods shed and loading bank. On 24 July 1913 a request for lighting was added. A passing loop originally provided for trains of up to 26 wagons, but was extended to 100 in 1970 and 123 in 1980. By then Caltex had a siding for 11 wagons and a fertiliser store for 15.

On 6 April 1909 a Post Office opened at the station. In May 1911 a burglar blew the post office safe. In October 1911 was said to be moved from station. However, in 1912 the Town Board asked for a stationmaster and postmaster to be appointed as the post office was on the station.

Signalling was interlocked by tablet in 1918. In 1938 fixed home and distance colour-light signals were installed and it became a switch-out tablet station.

Two Railways Department houses were added in 1954, but on 17 February 1978 the goods shed closed, on 31 January 1982 the station closed, except for goods in wagon loads and by 22 January 1989 there was only a concrete block equipment building left.

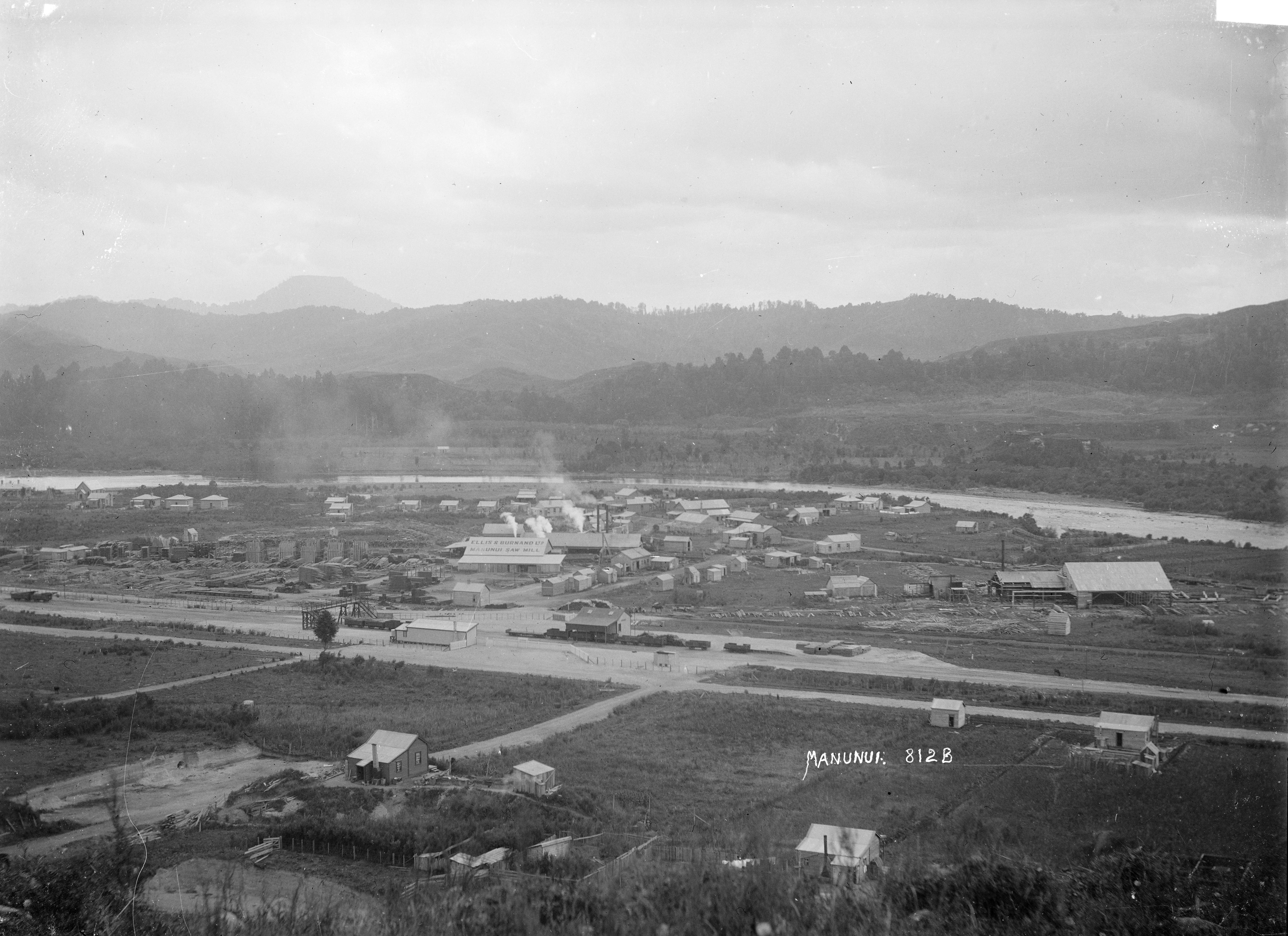
Manunui, with station in foreground, about 1908.

Ellis & Burnand built a large timber mill here. It was named Manunui from 24 August 1904, having previously been known as Waimarino. Logs were brought by a 5 mi (8.0 km) tramway from Ohotaka, with a 340 ft (100 m) bridge built over the Whanganui River in 1905. The mill closed in 1942 and burnt down in 1949, but the Ellis Veneer works continued, producing about 7,000,000 ft (2,100,000 m) of plywood in 1953.

From 1911 Pungapunga Sawmilling Co also had a siding for 5 wagons.
