= Shantytown Heritage Park =

Open-air museum in New Zealand

Coordinates: 42°32′8.6″S 171°10′53.6″E

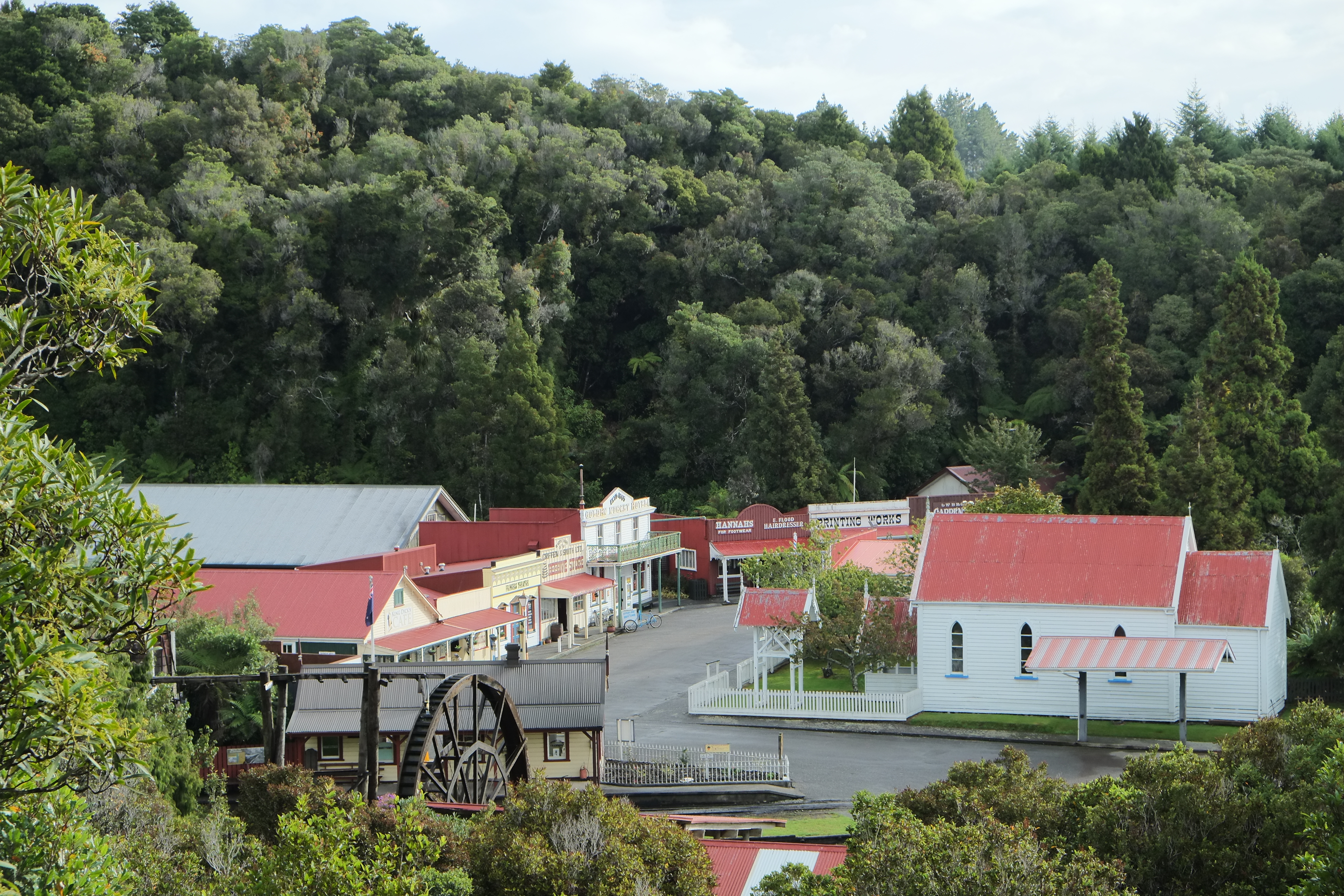
"Shantytown" from lookout

Shantytown Heritage Park, usually known as Shantytown, is a tourist attraction in the West Coast Region of the South Island of New Zealand. Located 10 kilometres (6.2 mi) south of Greymouth, the Heritage Park opened in 1971 and consists of 30 re-created historic buildings making up a 19th-century gold-mining town. The town is surrounded by native forest, and is one of the region's most popular attractions.

== History ==
Born out of the desire of the Greymouth community to preserve the West Coast gold-mining history, Shantytown was started by a group of local enthusiasts forming the West Coast Historical and Mechanical Society in 1968. Shantytown Heritage Park opened to the public on 23 January 1971. Most of the effort that has gone into the creation of Shantytown has been by volunteers and donated labour. Over the years, a collection of thousands of artefacts, ranging from gold-mining equipment to early settlers furniture, everyday items and clothing, as well as photographs, has been donated and collected from local people and businesses.

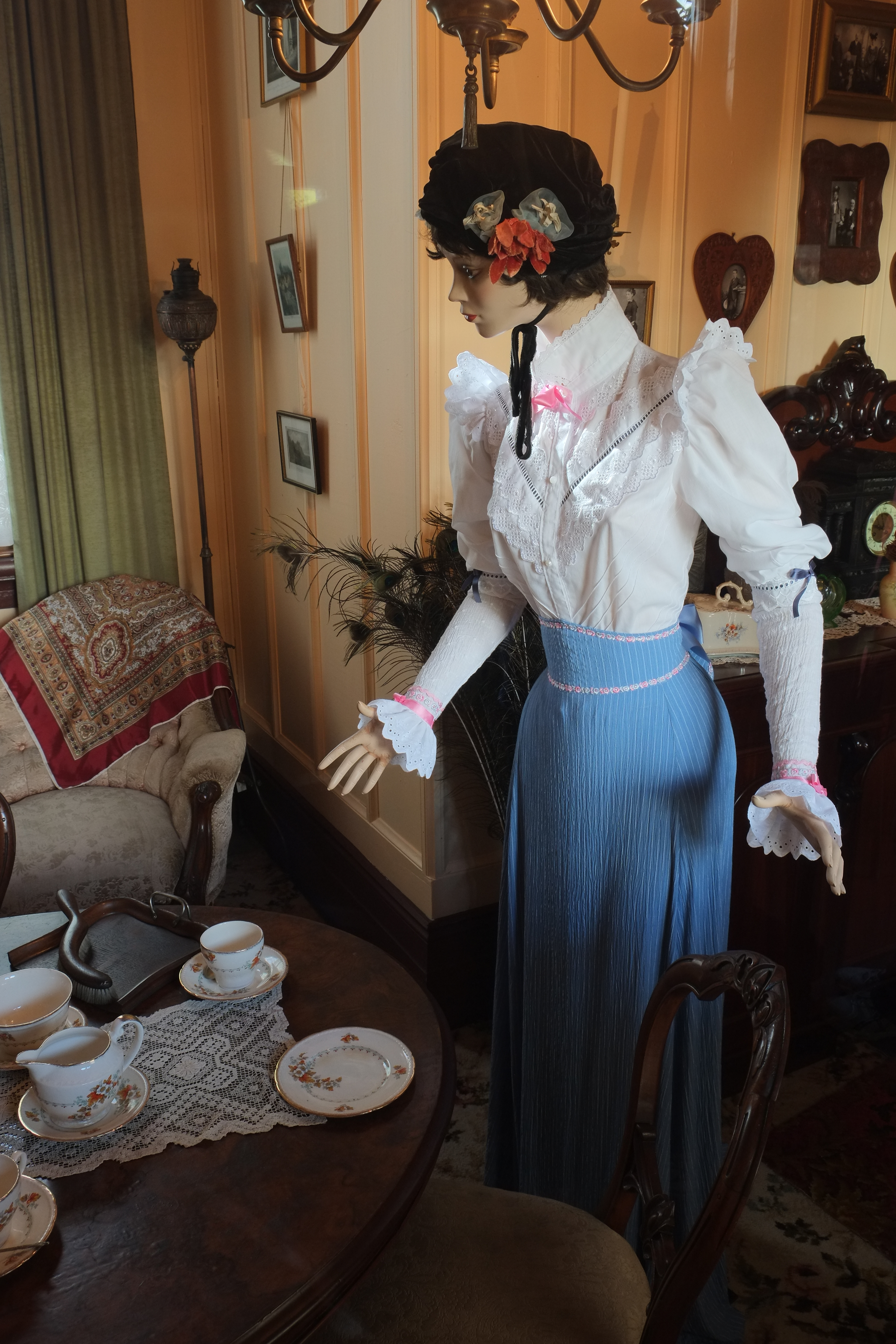
Victorian decorations and clothes on display

The collection and wider heritage park focuses mainly on the Victorian era between the middle of the 19th century to before the Great War, but extends as far as the 1940s. Many of the items are displayed in an authentic setting in the heritage park, while the more precious and fragile items of the collection are held in temperature- and humidity-controlled storage due to the damp weather on the West Coast and are viewable by appointment. Today, Shantytown Heritage Park remains under the stewardship of a local board and continues its tradition of extensive community involvement.

== Attractions ==
The township comprises two main streets lined with 30 historic buildings, including a church, and the two-storey coronation hall. The buildings are mostly original and transferred or re-built on site and house recreations of shops from around the late 19th century such as a bank, hotel, butcher, shoe shop, barber, carpenter and a blacksmith. Some of the shops sell goods, such as traditional lollies. The town also contains a hospital, train station, fire station, a Masonic Lodge, a church and a jail.

A foundry showcases the craftsmanship, tools and techniques of ironwork via interactive displays and preserved historic equipment.

Adjacent to the main township, a "Chinatown" area depicts the life and living environment of Chinese immigrant gold miners who had migrated to the West Coast in the 1860s from other gold fields in New Zealand as they ran dry, as well as directly from China.

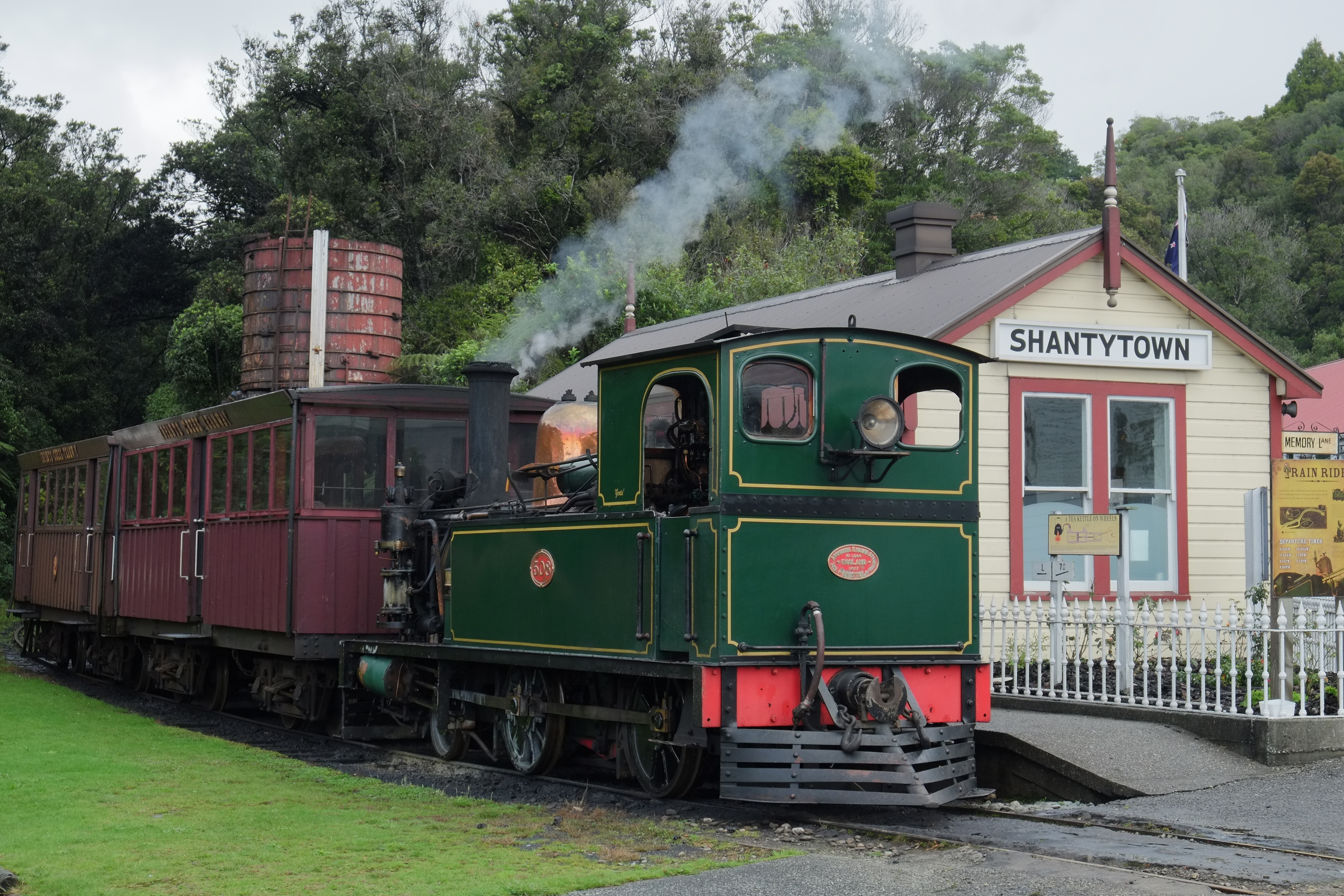
Locomotive NZR L 508 at Shantytown station

Shantytown also contains a re-created narrow-gauge bush tram line that follows a 19th-century sawmill tram track from the Shantytown train station to a stop at the Infants Creek Sawmill and a terminus 1.5 km from Shantytown for photo opportunities. Trains run throughout the day and are included in the admission. The train station is built as a 3/4 replica of original railway plans. Passengers can disembark at the Infants Creek Sawmill where a sluice gun is fired up to four times per day and tutored gold panning is available. The vintage passenger carriages are pulled by either "Gertie", an 1877 L-class steam engine from Avonside Engine Company in England, or by an 1896 improved F-class Kaitangata steam engine.

Other attractions include having an "old time" photo in costume taken, a holographic theatre show, and a playground. Short bush walks around the area lead to a surveyors monument and lookout.

The town's inter-denominational church, built in 1866, can be booked for weddings, and there is an education centre funded by the New Zealand Ministry of Education which caters for school groups wanting hands-on history education.

Shantytown has a cafe and souvenir shop, and is open all year round apart from Christmas Day.

== Locomotives ==
Name	Manufacturer	Maker's No	Year	Technical data	Comment
Kaitangata or Katie	Sharp, Stewart & Company Glasgow, Scotland	4270	1896	22 short tons (19.6 long tons; 20.0 t), 10.5 in × 18 in (267 mm × 457 mm) cylinders, 160 psi (1,100 kPa) boiler pressure, 36 in (914 mm) diameter wheels, TE 7,000 lbf (31 kN)	This 'Improved F-Class Kaitangata' was similar to the New Zealand Railways (N.Z.R.) 'F' class. It was manufactured for the Kaitangata Railway & Coal Co. and used on their 8 km long line from the coal mine at Kaitangata to the N.Z.R. exchange sidings at Stirling. After the State Mines Department took over the mine and railway in the 1956, the locomotive was still being used until the line closed in 1970. In January 1971 the locomotive was donated to Shantytown.
PWD 508, Gertie	Avonside Engine Company, Bristol, England	1206	1877	20 short tons (17.9 long tons; 18.1 t), 10.5 in × 18 in (267 mm × 457 mm) cylinders, 160 psi (1,100 kPa) boiler pressure, 36 in (914 mm) diameter wheels, TE 7,000 lbf (31 kN)	This L class locomotive is one of 10 built for the New Zealand Railways. It was sold to the Public Works Department in 1901 and renumbered PWD 508. The locomotive worked on various construction projects in the North Island between 1903 and 1931. In 1946 PWD 508 was sold to the Portland Cement Co. in Whangārei and used until 1964. Donated to the Tauranga Historic Village in 1974 and used it for 24 years. Shantytown purchased the support of a ‘Lottery – Environment & Heritage’ grant. After a complete overhaul it returned to work in 2002. The locomotive's boiler ticket expired in 2014.
Climax	Climax Locomotive Works in Pennsylvania	1203	1912	20 short tons (17.9 long tons; 18.1 t), 9 in × 12 in (229 mm × 305 mm) cylinders, 120 psi (830 kPa) boiler pressure, 30 in (762 mm) diameter wheels, TE 6,000 lbf (27 kN)	Built for the Patate Timber Co. of Matapuna near Taumarunui and assembled in the NZ Railways Petone workshops, it was sold a few years later to Pukaweka Sawmills Limited at Mananui, who were agents for the Patate firm. Used by the North Island's logging industry, e.g. for Ellis & Burnand, who owned several sawmills in the central North Island. During the 1940s it was used at E & B's Mangapahei mill. Subsequently, used as a yard shunter in 1962. In 1968 it was purchased by John Melse. In 1971 it was then leased to the society and stored until 1973 when restoration commenced. It was recommissioned in 1980. In 1988 John Melse sold it to the society. It was withdrawn from service in 2002 and has been in storage since.
The Opossum			1875		One of the earliest New Zealand-built locomotives. It is the oldest completely existing example. Built for the NZR in 1875. When it arrived it was placed into storage at Foxton. It was then sold to Butler & O'Connor, GM in 1877. It only lasted a year there until being on-sold to Public Works Department, Harbour Works. Then to the Greymouth Harbour Board in 1884 and Ogilvie's, Gladstone in 1911. Displayed in Greymouth from 1958 until 1986 when it was donated to the society. Stored until 2009 when restoration commenced for it to be placed on static display. This was complete in 2012.
Heisler	Heisler Locomotive Works	1494	1924		This geared locomotive is one of the few survivors of this manufacturer. Built for Midland Saw Milling, Camerons in 1924. It was then sold to New Forest Sawmills, Ngahere in 1929. Then to Unused, Kangaroo Creek in 1958. In 1966 it was placed into storage. In 1969 it was purchased by the society. Stored until 2010 when restoration commenced for it to be placed on static display. This was complete in 2012.
T^{R} 107 (TMS: TR 396)	A&G Price	176	1957		This diesel locomotive entered NZR service in May 1957. During this time it was reclassified as W^{W} 4733 by the Ways and Works Department at Middleton. It was later reclassified back as T^{R} 107. Renumbered as TR 396 in 1978 and withdrawn in 2005. Purchased by the society in the same year. It was used until 2007 when withdrawn from service for a restoration. This was completed in 2008 and it now wears a green livery with "Infants Creek Tramway" written above the long hood. It has named "Rosie" in preservation.
Nattrass	Nattrass Rail Tractors Ltd. Wellington		1936		This converted Fordson farm tractor was patented in November 1924 by Howard Nattrass, a car sales man. It enabled the sawmills to expand their operations into areas previously inaccessible with horse trams.

== See also ==
- West Coast Historical and Mechanical Society
