= New Zealand UD class wagon =

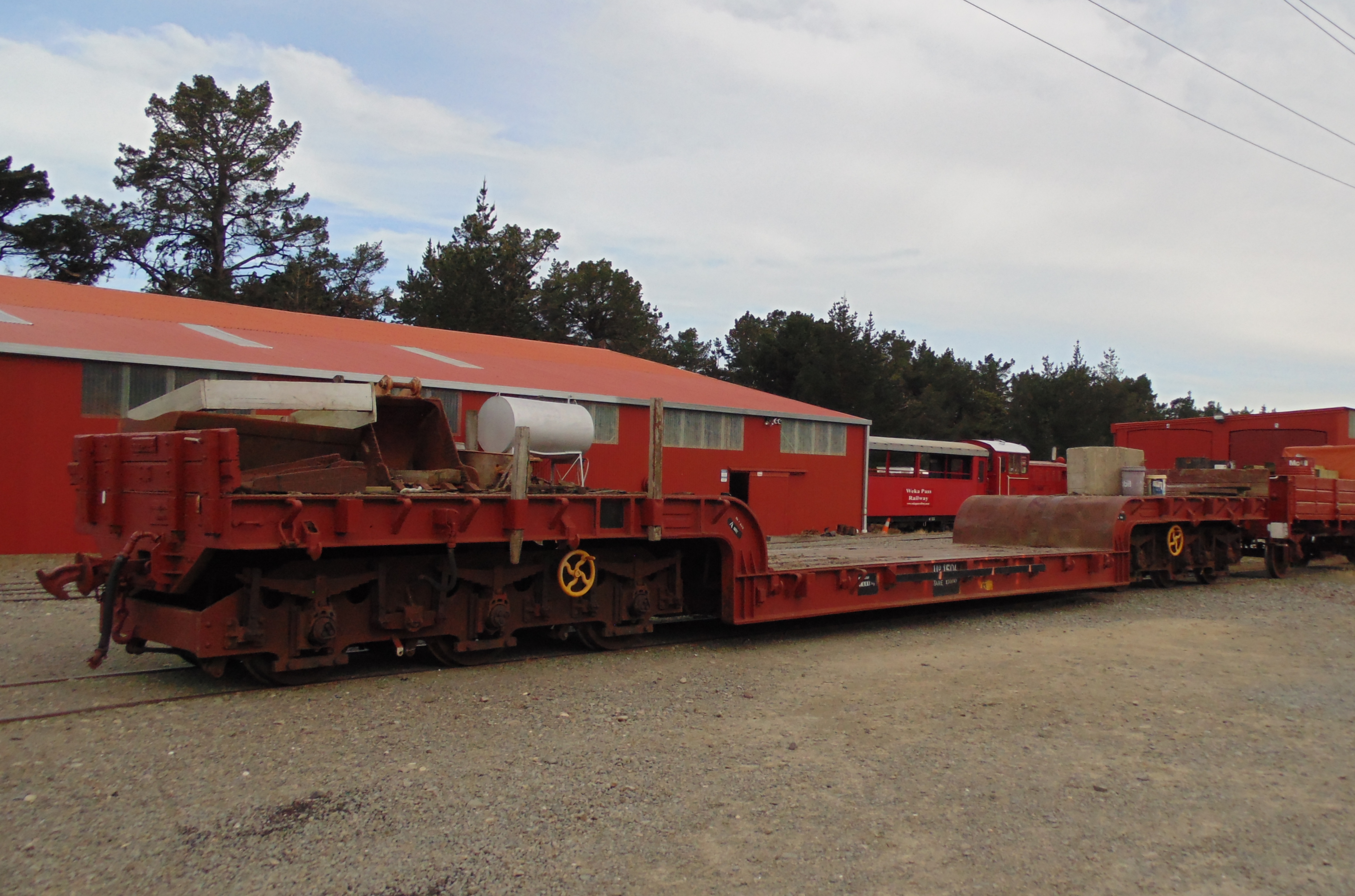
- U^{D} 1504 in Waipara
- Manufacturer: Otahuhu Workshops; Hutt Workshops; Hillside Workshops
- Constructed: 1940–1952
- Number built: 5
- Number preserved: 4
- Number scrapped: 1
- Fleet numbers: 1500 - 1504 (TMS: 26 - 61)
- Capacity: 26.17 m^{2} (281.7 sq ft) (UD-1); 25.28 m^{2} (272.1 sq ft) (UD-2/3)
- Operators: New Zealand Railways Department

Specifications
- Car length: 12.26 m (40 ft 2 5/8 in) (UD-1); 16.31 m (53 ft 6 1/8 in) (UD-2/3) over couplers
- Weight: UD-1: 26 t (26 long tons; 29 short tons); UD-2: 40 t (39 long tons; 44 short tons); UD-3 60 t (59 long tons; 66 short tons)
- Track gauge: 3 ft 6 in (1,067 mm)

The New Zealand UD class wagon is a type of bogie well-wagon. Five were built, with four surviving in preservation.

== Introduction and service ==
The UD class were designed to carry overweight loads. The wagons entered service for the New Zealand Railways between 1940 and 1952. There are three types: UD-2/3 which are the larger type which travels on two six-wheel bogies, and has a distribution load of 41 tonnes to 61 tonnes, whereas the smaller type, UD-1, travels on two four wheel bogies and has a distribution load of 26.5 tonnes. The wagons were used by the New Zealand Railways Department mostly all over the country.

UDs 1501 and 1502 were later reclassified as EAs (the classification of EA is given to bogie wagons which were assigned to the NZR Ways and Works department. The former was renumbered as EA 7553, while the latter was renumbered as EA 7576. In 1992, all were reclassified as the EWW class wagon.

== Disposal ==
All UD wagons have been withdrawn from service. All but one have are now preserved by the Rail Heritage Trust of New Zealand, while 1503 was scrapped by Seaview Sims Pacific Steel in June 2011. The remaining wagons are now on loan to preservation societies.
