= Matapuna railway station =

Railway station in New Zealand

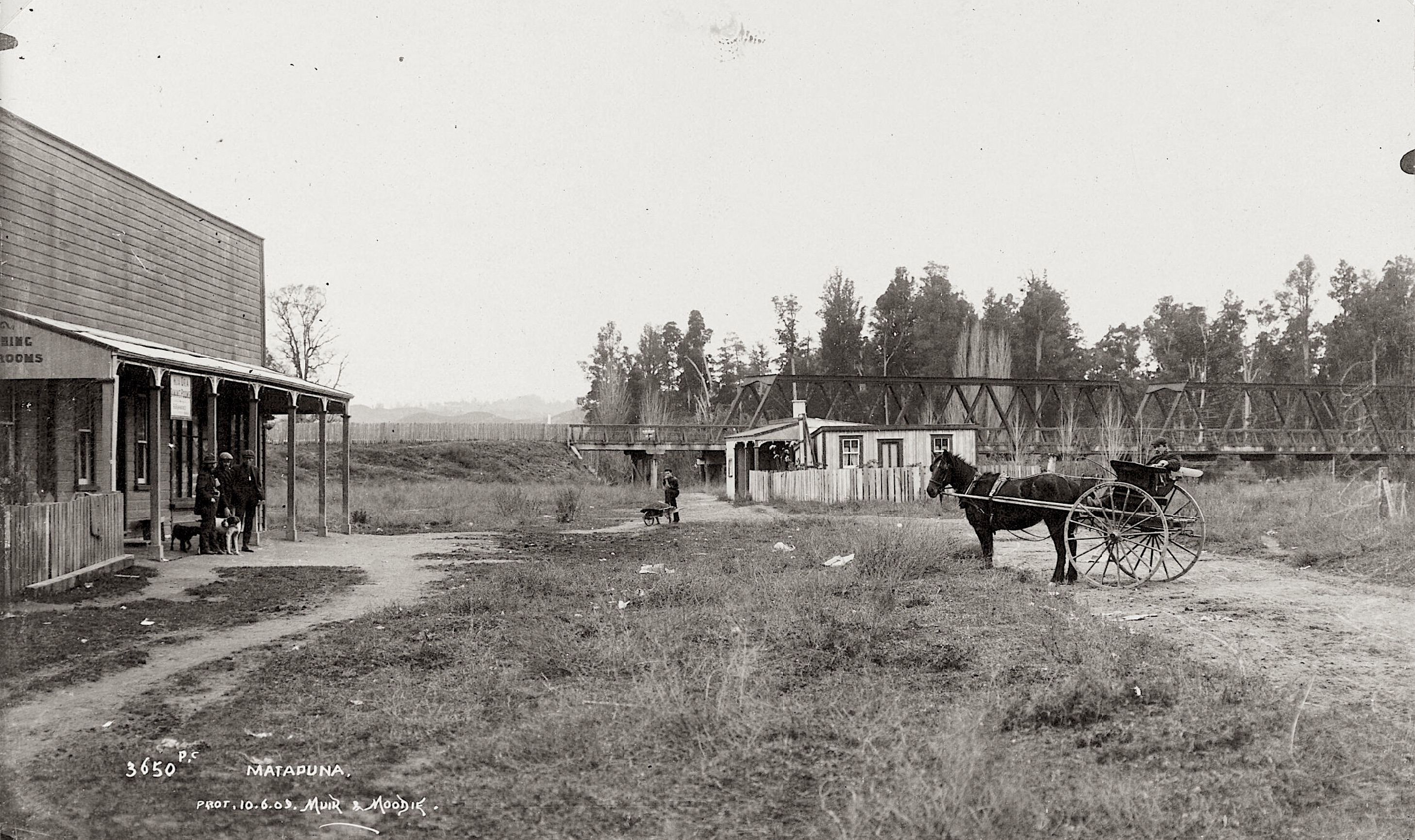
- Matapuna in 1909. The cottage is probably the bridge-keeper's

General information
- Location: New Zealand
- Coordinates: 38.8815°S 175.2934°E
- Elevation: 180 m (590 ft)
- Line: North Island Main Trunk
- Distance: Wellington 394.8 km (245.3 mi)

History
- Opened: 22 June 1903
- Closed: 31 March 1987
- Electrified: June 1988

Services
Preceding station	Historical railways	Following station
Taumarunui; Line open, station open	North Island Main Trunk; KiwiRail	Manunui; Line open, station closed

Heritage New Zealand – Category 1
- Designated: 27 March 2009 (bridge)
- Reference no.: 9277
Location

Matapuna had several sidings on the North Island Main Trunk line, in the Ruapehu District of New Zealand, serving the east Taumarunui suburb on the north bank of the Whanganui River. It was 2.9 km (1.8 mi) north west of Manunui and 2.95 km (1.83 mi) east of Taumarunui. Work was largely complete by May 1903, and freight was handled from 22 June 1903. A fixed signal was placed at the station and a distant at the bridge in 1917 and the ballast pit siding was interlocked by tablet in 1918. A racecourse opened to the south of the bridge in 1916 and some trains served the course on race days, though no platform appears on aerial photos and only the ballast pit was mapped.

Before the railway came, a Ngāti Hāua kāinga was on the south side of the river, which could be forded, except when in flood.

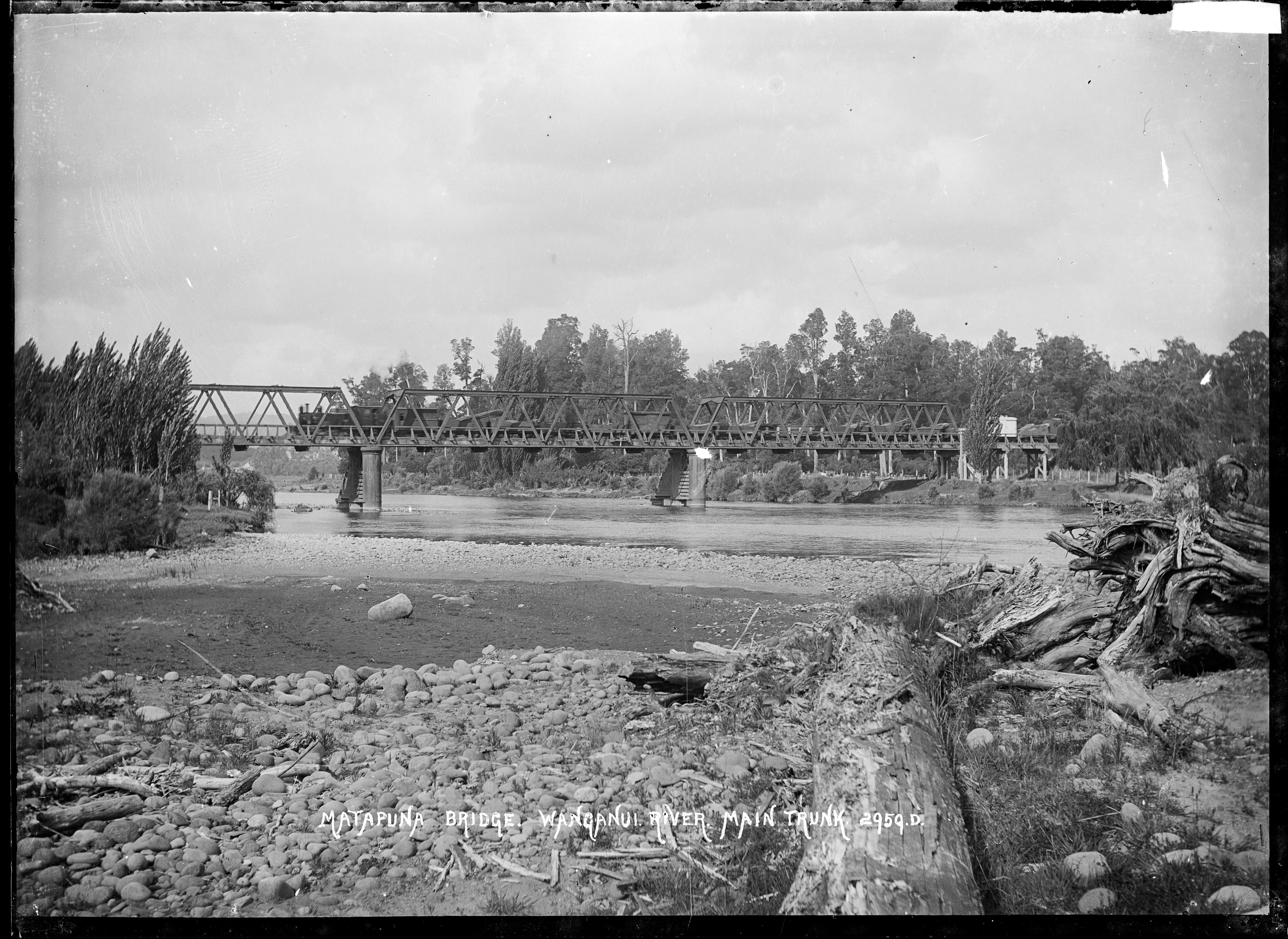
Matapuna Bridge about 1910

== Matapuna Bridge ==
Matapuna Bridge, to the south east of the station, takes the NIMT over the Whanganui River. It has three 122 ft (37 m) steel through trusses, plus a 40 ft (12 m) steel girder at each end, totalling 470 ft (140 m) long. It was built from March 1903 to January 1904 by Scott Bros. Ltd. Peter Seton Hay, Engineer-in-Chief of the Public Works Department, was probably the designer. The bridge was repaired and strengthened in 1916, 1938, 1956, 1965, 1967 and 2006. The 1903 central cast iron cylinder piers, cutwaters, timber cross-bracings and boxing remain, though most other parts have been replaced. From 1905 to May 1962 it was a road rail bridge, with traffic controlled by bridge-keepers. The road was 11 ft (3.4 m) wide. Road use ended when a concrete bridge opened on SH4. It is now Bridge 197, 750 m (2,460 ft) south of the station site.

== Puketapu Sawmilling Co Ltd ==
Puketapu was recognised as a potential source of totara as early as 1903 and the company was advertising for bush cutting and construction of a 1.5 mi (2.4 km) tramway in 1905. The sawmill must have been operating by 1906, when they experimented with floating sawn timber down the river. Another sawmill was also operating nearby in 1906, which possibly the company had taken over by 1908, when the tramway extended for 5 mi (8.0 km). The company was in liquidation in 1909, but was taken over by Pukuweka Sawmills. The bush tramway was linked to the main line and had two locomotives in 1911. The last year the mill was recorded as using the railway siding was 1915.

== Ballast pit ==
Most of the original ballast for the central portion of the NIMT was extracted from the river at the ballast reserve, just north of the bridge, from 1903.
