= Rata railway station =

Railway station in New Zealand

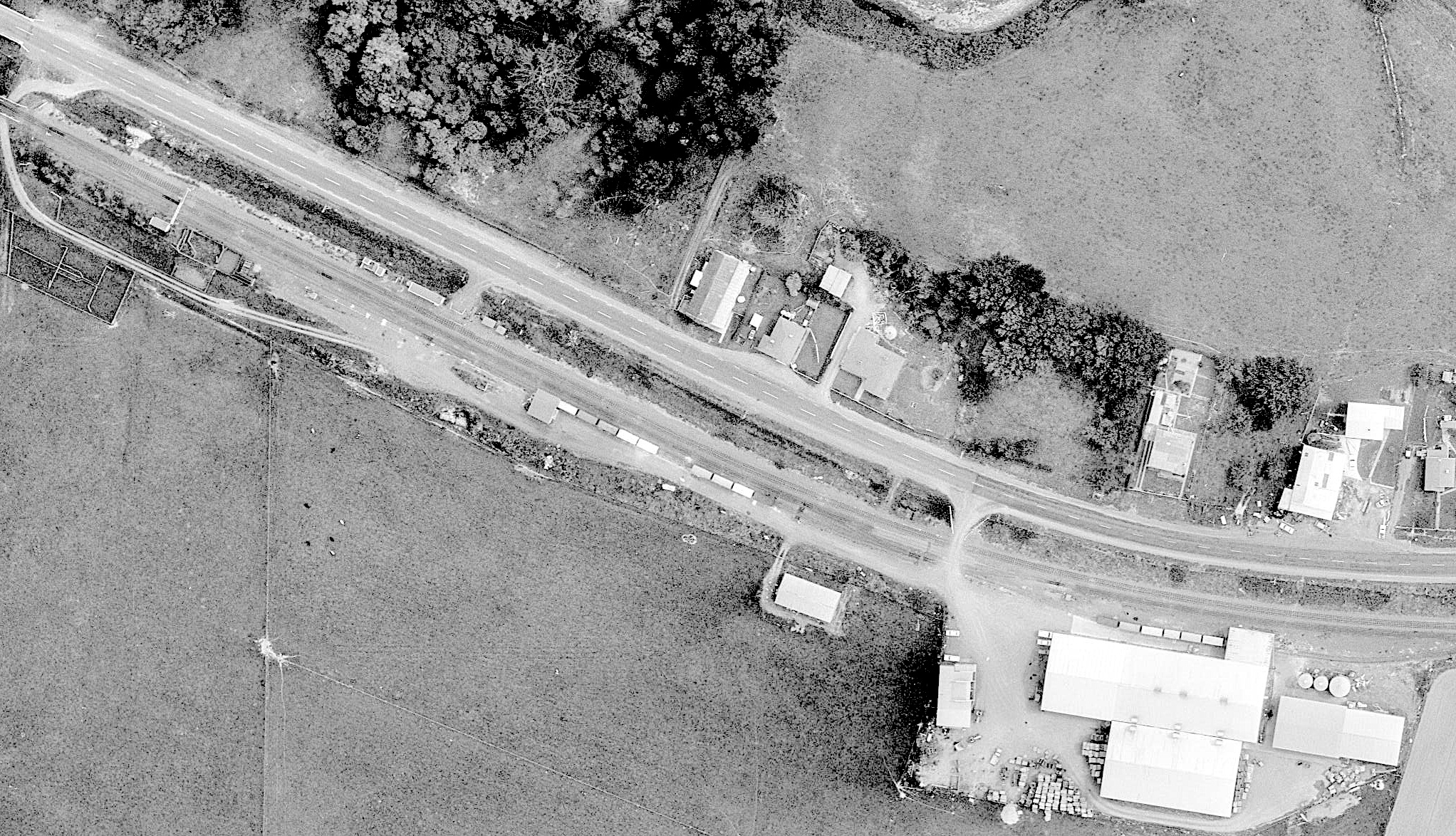
- Rata railway station in 1971

General information
- Location: New Zealand
- Coordinates: 39.996432°S 175.514206°E
- Elevation: 194 m (636 ft)
- Line: North Island Main Trunk
- Distance: Wellington 195.46 km (121.45 mi)

History
- Opened: 2 June 1888
- Closed: To passengers by December 1975; To goods 14 December 1983
- Electrified: June 1988

Services
Preceding station	Historical railways	Following station
Silverhope; Line open, station closed 4.82 km (3.00 mi)	North Island Main Trunk; KiwiRail	Porewa; Line open, station closed 4.93 km (3.06 mi)
Location

Rata railway station was a station on the North Island Main Trunk in New Zealand, between Marton and Hunterville, 9 mi 46 ch (15.4 km) from Marton. There is now just a single track through the station site, a new crossing loop having replaced those at Rata and Porewa from 14 December 1983, 3.04 km (1.89 mi) to the west of Rata. The realignment of State Highway 1 alongside the railway in 2006 took some former railway land.

== History ==
The line was inspected in 1884 and the official opening of the 15 mi 57 ch (25.3 km) Marton to Hunterville branch (later incorporated into the NIMT) was on Saturday 2 June 1888, when the station was served by two trains a week. By 1894 the branch had two trains a day.

Rata had a population of 210 in 1901, which had declined to 170 by 1911. In 1888 and 1889 Bailey Brothers asked for a private siding at Rata station. They had one by 1891, by which time there was another sawmill, both largely cutting totara. The last sawmill moved north in 1905. Rata had a butter factory in 1904. Floods affected the area in 1913.

By 1896 Rata had a shelter shed, passenger platform, cattle yards, water service, urinals and a passing loop for 19 wagons. Sheep and cattle yards were added in 1898. A cart approach was built and a railway cottage moved from Mangaonoho in 1904. A loading platform was built in 1907 and a shed from Utiku was used for the tablet equipment. The station was enlarged in 1908, a post office provided in 1910 and fixed signals added in 1911. In 1913 a request was made for a goods shed, which was rejected in 1916.

Rata was an unattended flag station from 13 August 1978. Removal of the station building was approved in 1979, but it remained in 1980, together with a goods shed and loading bank used by Rangitikei Farm Products. On Sunday, 31 January 1982 Rata closed to all but private siding traffic and to all traffic on 14 December 1983.

State Highway 1 was straightened between Silverhope and Rata in 2006, taking some former railway land.
