= Ohotu railway station =

Defunct railway station in New Zealand

General information
- Location: New Zealand
- Coordinates: 39.71°S 175.83°E
- Elevation: 396 m (1,299 ft)
- Line: North Island Main Trunk
- Distance: Wellington 247.09 km (153.53 mi)
- Connections: until 5 January 1915 known as Egmont Box Co's siding

History
- Opened: 21 November 1904
- Closed: 10 August 1959
- Electrified: June 1988

Services
Preceding station	Historical railways	Following station
Winiata; Line open, station closed 1.94 km (1.21 mi)	North Island Main Trunk; KiwiRail	Utiku; Line open, station closed 3.4 km (2.1 mi)
Location

Ohotu railway station was a station on the North Island Main Trunk in New Zealand. When the station closed to all traffic, on 10 August 1959, it had a shelter shed and passenger platform. It was part of the 13 1/2 mi (21.7 km) Mangaweka to Taihape section, opened by the Prime Minister, Richard Seddon, on 21 November 1904. The station was across the Hautapu River from Torere village, which had been surveyed in 1896.

Only a single track remains through the station site and there is little sign that there was ever a station there.

The New Zealand Ministry for Culture and Heritage gives a translation of "place of [the] fifteenth night of the moon" for Ōhotu.

== Name ==
From 1908 Egmont Box Co had a sawmill at Ohutu, sometimes called Utiku, or Torere. When the track laying reached Ohotu in April 1904, it was described as Torere Junction. From 5 January 1915 Egmont Box Co's siding, was renamed Ohotu and it then became a booking station handling passengers and parcels. The name of the post office changed from Ohutu to Ohotu in 1925.

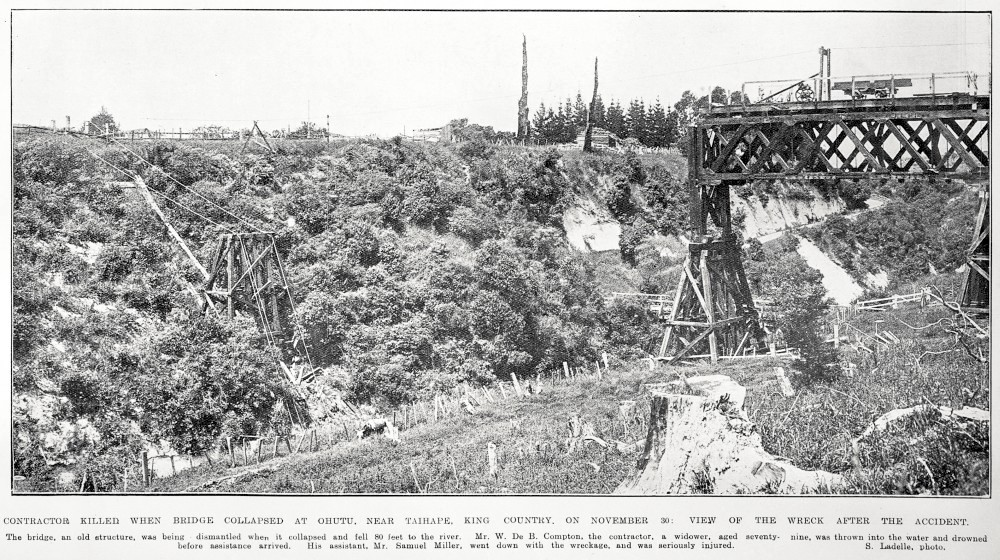
Ohotu Egmont Box Co tramway bridge after an accident during demolition in 1923

== Timber ==
From 1908 until its closure in 1926, Egmont Box Co's mill cut roughly 42,000,000 board feet (99,000 m^{3}) of kahikatea, mainly for butter boxes, in addition to some rimu. Its tramway was extended as the bush was cut, until it was cut out in 1921 and the mill closed. The centre span of the 120 ft (37 m) Howe Truss bridge, 160 ft (49 m) above the river, built of timbers up to 16 in (410 mm) thick, which had been built by Sykes the & Shaw in 1911, developed a crack which made it dangerous to run their Climax locomotive over it, so trucks were pulled over with a winch. When the bush was cut out the bridge was sold for scrap. During demolition in 1923 it collapsed, killing one man and injuring another.
