= Mangaweka =

Rural settlement in Manawatū-Whanganui, New Zealand

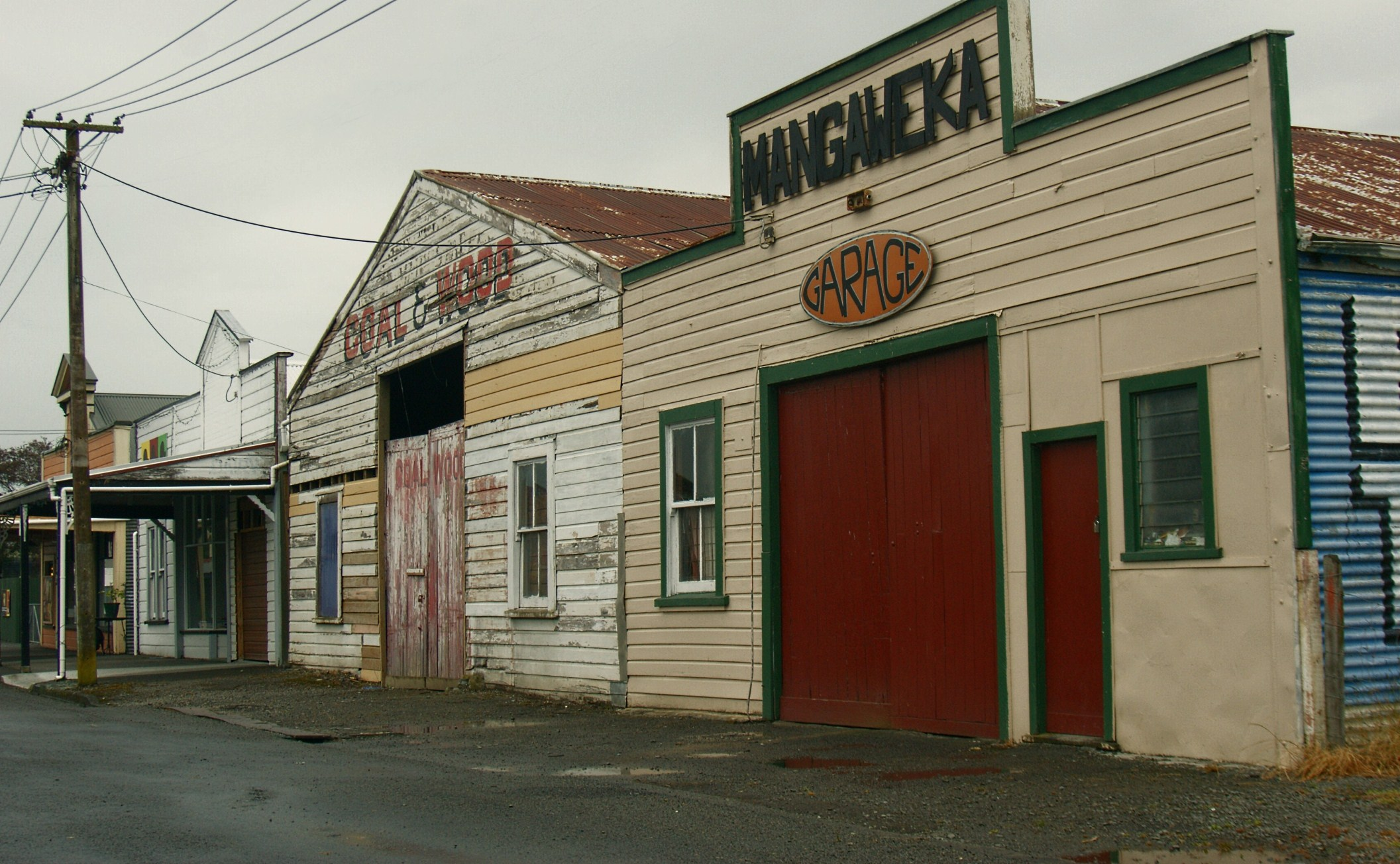
- Mangaweka's historical area in 2011
- Interactive map of Mangaweka
- Coordinates: 39°48′S 175°47′E}
- Country: New Zealand
- Region: Manawatū-Whanganui
- District: Rangitikei District
- Wards: Northern General Ward; Tiikeitia ki Uta (Inland) Māori Ward
- Community: Taihape Community
- Electorates: Rangitīkei; Te Tai Hauāuru (Māori)

Government
  - Territorial Authority: Rangitikei District Council
  - Regional council: Horizons Regional Council
  - Mayor of Rangitikei: Andy Watson
  - Rangitīkei MP: Suze Redmayne
  - Te Tai Hauāuru MP: Debbie Ngarewa-Packer

Area
  - Total: 0.47 km^{2} (0.18 sq mi)

Population (June 2025)
  - Total: 110
  - Density: 230/km^{2} (610/sq mi)

Mangaweka is a township on State Highway One (SH1) in the Manawatū-Whanganui region of the North Island of New Zealand. It is located between Taihape to the north and Hunterville to the south, has a population of just under 200. The Rangitīkei River, adjacent to the township, is popular for rafting, kayaking, fishing and swimming.

The New Zealand Ministry for Culture and Heritage gives a translation of "weka stream" for Mangaweka.

== History ==
The government constructed a road from Hunterville to Taihape and constructed shelters along the road. One on the site of what is now Mangaweka had the name 'Three Log Whare'. Mangaweka was surveyed out of the Awarua block to support the expansion of the North Island Main Trunk and roads in the area during the late 19th-century. By 1894 the settlement a post office, hall, and school. By the turn of the century the populated had reached close to 1,000.

== Attractions ==
State Highway 1 was re-located in the early 1980s, leaving the former main street as a historic precinct. As a result, the settlement has become a tourist attraction. The township is of interest not only for its historic main street, but also because of the growing artists' community.

The Department of Conservation have several scenic reserve walks around Mangaweka including one that includes a section of the former North Island Main Trunk railway line and tunnels that was replaced by a deviation in 1981.

Other major features close to the town include some of the country's biggest railway viaducts on the Mangaweka deviation. Nearby, the Rangitikei River canyon provided the setting for one of the southern hemisphere's largest flying foxes, an 80m bungy jump, as well as a The Lord of the Rings film location.

== DC3 aircraft ==
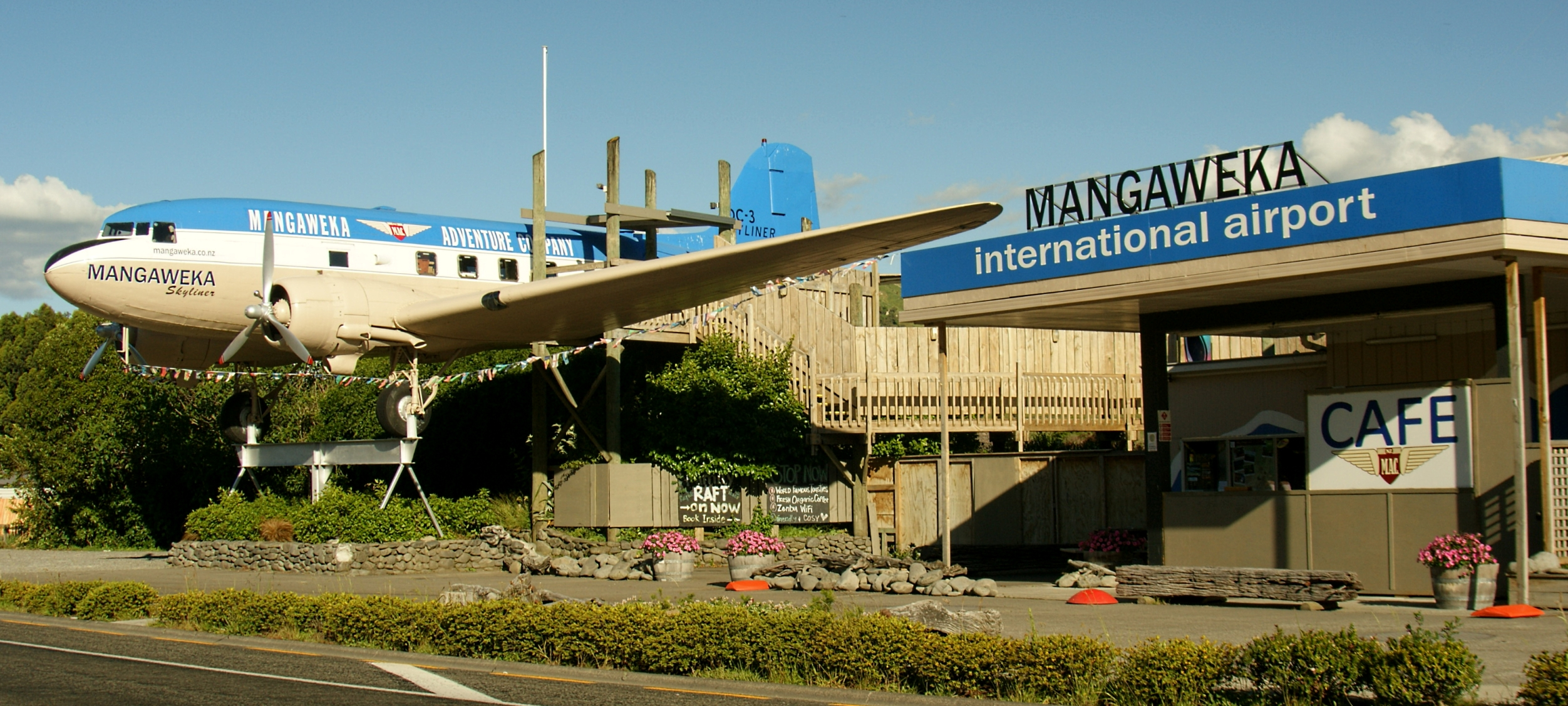
Mangaweka DC3 in 2011

For over 30 years, a well-known landmark in Mangaweka was an elevated Douglas DC-3 aircraft installed in the middle of the town as a tearooms, adjacent to a service station on SH1. The aircraft was built for the US Airforce in 1945 but was transferred to the Royal New Zealand Airforce. It had 700 hours of service with the RNZAF 40 Squadron. In 1947 it was sold to the New Zealand National Airways Corporation registered as ZK-APK, and given the name Poaka. The aircraft was equipped with larger viewing windows in 1964, and became part of the airline's Skyliner fleet. It was in commercial passenger service from 1947 until 1969. It was then used for top-dressing operations until being withdrawn from service in 1981, having completed a total of 42,764 flying hours.

The aircraft was installed as an attraction in Mangaweka in 1984 by the owners of the local service station, to help promote their river adventure company.

By 2018, the future of the aircraft was uncertain. In 2021 the plane was moved to Shannon for restoration and in 2023, the aircraft was put up for sale.

== Demographics ==
Mangaweka is described by Statistics New Zealand as a rural settlement. It covers 0.47 km^{2} (0.18 sq mi) and had an estimated population of 110 as of June 2025, with a population density of 234 people per km^{2}. It is part of the larger Mokai Patea statistical area.

Historical population for Mangaweka
| Year | Pop. | ±% p.a. |
|---|---|---|
| 2006 | 111 | — |
| 2013 | 105 | −0.79% |
| 2018 | 90 | −3.04% |
| 2023 | 114 | +4.84% |

Mangaweka had a population of 114 in the 2023 New Zealand census, an increase of 24 people (26.7%) since the 2018 census, and an increase of 9 people (8.6%) since the 2013 census. There were 60 males and 51 females in 51 dwellings. 2.6% of people identified as LGBTIQ+. The median age was 49.0 years (compared with 38.1 years nationally). There were 18 people (15.8%) aged under 15 years, 12 (10.5%) aged 15 to 29, 63 (55.3%) aged 30 to 64, and 24 (21.1%) aged 65 or older.

People could identify as more than one ethnicity. The results were 86.8% European (Pākehā), 26.3% Māori, and 5.3% Pasifika. English was spoken by 97.4%, Māori by 10.5%, and other languages by 5.3%. No language could be spoken by 2.6% (e.g. too young to talk). The percentage of people born overseas was 10.5, compared with 28.8% nationally.

The sole religious affiliation given was 26.3% Christian. People who answered that they had no religion were 57.9%, and 15.8% of people did not answer the census question.

Of those at least 15 years old, 9 (9.4%) people had a bachelor's or higher degree, 51 (53.1%) had a post-high school certificate or diploma, and 36 (37.5%) people exclusively held high school qualifications. The median income was $29,800, compared with $41,500 nationally. 3 people (3.1%) earned over $100,000 compared to 12.1% nationally. The employment status of those at least 15 was 42 (43.8%) full-time, 21 (21.9%) part-time, and 3 (3.1%) unemployed.

=== Mokai Patea statistical area ===
The Mokai Patea statistical area includes Pukeokahu, Moawhango, Mataroa, Papanui Junction, and Taoroa Junction, and surrounds but does not include Taihape. Mokai Patea covers 2,474.89 km^{2} (955.56 sq mi) and had an estimated population of 1,770 as of June 2025, with a population density of 0.7 people per km^{2}.

Historical population for Mokai Patea
| Year | Pop. | ±% p.a. |
|---|---|---|
| 2006 | 1,911 | — |
| 2013 | 1,761 | −1.16% |
| 2018 | 1,716 | −0.52% |
| 2023 | 1,749 | +0.38% |

Mokai Patea had a population of 1,749 in the 2023 New Zealand census, an increase of 33 people (1.9%) since the 2018 census, and a decrease of 12 people (−0.7%) since the 2013 census. There were 918 males, 825 females, and 3 people of other genders in 711 dwellings. 1.5% of people identified as LGBTIQ+. The median age was 40.8 years (compared with 38.1 years nationally). There were 351 people (20.1%) aged under 15 years, 291 (16.6%) aged 15 to 29, 813 (46.5%) aged 30 to 64, and 294 (16.8%) aged 65 or older.

People could identify as more than one ethnicity. The results were 85.9% European (Pākehā), 27.6% Māori, 3.1% Pasifika, 0.7% Asian, and 4.1% other, which includes people giving their ethnicity as "New Zealander". English was spoken by 97.6%, Māori by 6.5%, and other languages by 2.4%. No language could be spoken by 1.9% (e.g. too young to talk). New Zealand Sign Language was known by 0.2%. The percentage of people born overseas was 7.7, compared with 28.8% nationally.

Religious affiliations were 33.6% Christian, 0.2% Hindu, 1.5% Māori religious beliefs, 0.2% Buddhist, 0.3% New Age, and 0.3% other religions. People who answered that they had no religion were 55.1%, and 8.9% of people did not answer the census question.

Of those at least 15 years old, 210 (15.0%) people had a bachelor's or higher degree, 840 (60.1%) had a post-high school certificate or diploma, and 351 (25.1%) people exclusively held high school qualifications. The median income was $41,800, compared with $41,500 nationally. 114 people (8.2%) earned over $100,000 compared to 12.1% nationally. The employment status of those at least 15 was 831 (59.4%) full-time, 246 (17.6%) part-time, and 18 (1.3%) unemployed.

== Education ==
Mangaweka School is a co-educational state primary school for Year 1 to 8 students, with a roll of 44 as of July 2026. It opened in 1894.

== Notable people ==
Notable people who have lived or worked in Mangaweka include the New Zealand poet Sam Hunt and the artist Robin White (whose iconic "Mangaweka" painting hangs in Te Papa).The town also hosts an annual "Fakes & Forgeries Art Exhibition and Festival" in October and November. Karl Sim the notorious New Zealand art forger was born in the town, and was a regular attendee at the festival until his death in 2013. Clement Gordon Watson, an editor, journalist, World War Two soldier and communist activist was also born in Mangaweka.

== See also ==
- Mangaweka deviation
- Mangaweka railway station
