= Winiata railway station =

Railway station in New Zealand

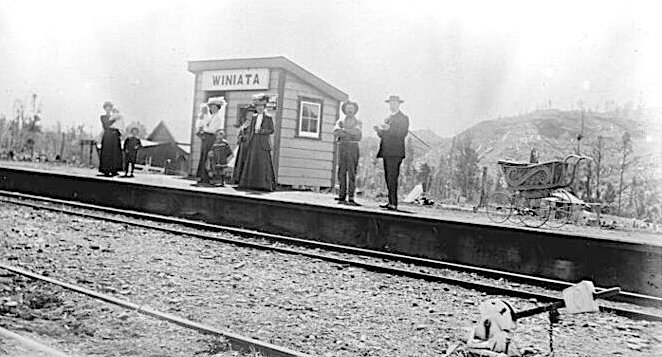
- Winiata railway station about 1910

General information
- Location: New Zealand
- Coordinates: 39.691062°S 175.811934°E
- Elevation: 415 m (1,362 ft)
- Line: North Island Main Trunk
- Distance: Wellington 249.03 km (154.74 mi)

History
- Opened: 21 November 1904
- Closed: Passengers 10 August 1959; Goods 12 March 1972
- Electrified: June 1988
- Former names: Bosher's Siding name change approved 17 December 1906

Services
Preceding station	Historical railways	Following station
Taihape; Line open, station closed 2.82 km (1.75 mi)	North Island Main Trunk; KiwiRail	Ohotu; Line open, station closed 1.94 km (1.21 mi)
Location

Winiata railway station was a station on the North Island Main Trunk in New Zealand. It was decorated with an archway when the 13 1/2 mi (21.7 km) Mangaweka to Taihape section was opened by the Prime Minister, Richard Seddon, on 21 November 1904.

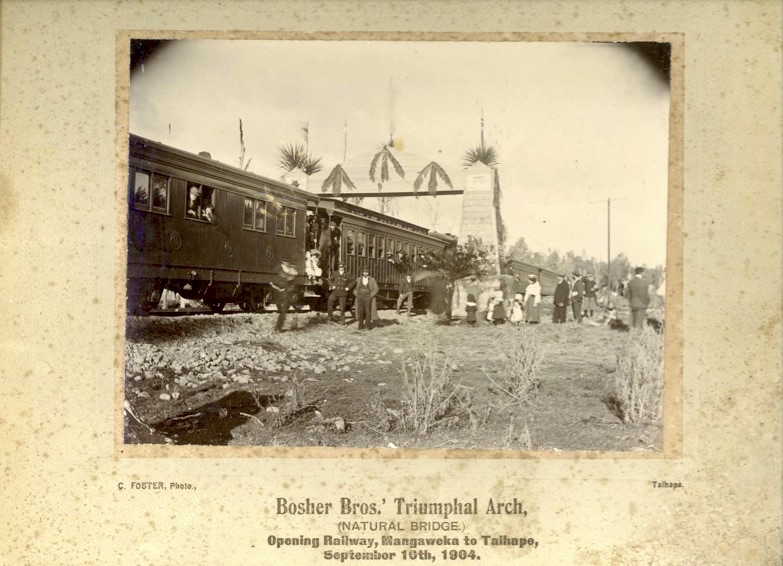
Opening of the railway at Bosher's siding natural arch, 10 September 1904

Only a single track remains through the station site and there is little sign that there was ever a station there.

== History ==
On 25 January 1904 the sawmillers, Bosher Bros, applied for siding, which cost them about £400. On 17 August 1905 an application was made for passenger trains to stop there and a platform and shelter for passengers were ready by November 1906. H D Bennett took over Bosher's private siding in 1913 and it became a public siding in 1915, when Taihape freezing works was built. They opened a siding on the other side of the line. That works closed in 1925. The platform was raised in 1936. Sheep loading yards were built in 1937 and extended in 1941.

Like the other stations along this part of NIMT, Winiata had freight from several other timber mills, including Bright & Carter, Manawatu Timber Co, Sowersby and Symes. By 1959 only lime, manure and sheep were being carried and the sidings stored stock wagons during the slack season. On 10 August 1959 the station closed to passengers, parcels, and goods in small lots. In 1969 the sheep yards and west siding closed. By 1972 Taihape Bulk Fertilisers had stopped using the station, which was closed on 12 March 1972, after which the sheep yards and station building were dismantled.
