= Mangaonoho railway station =

Railway station in New Zealand

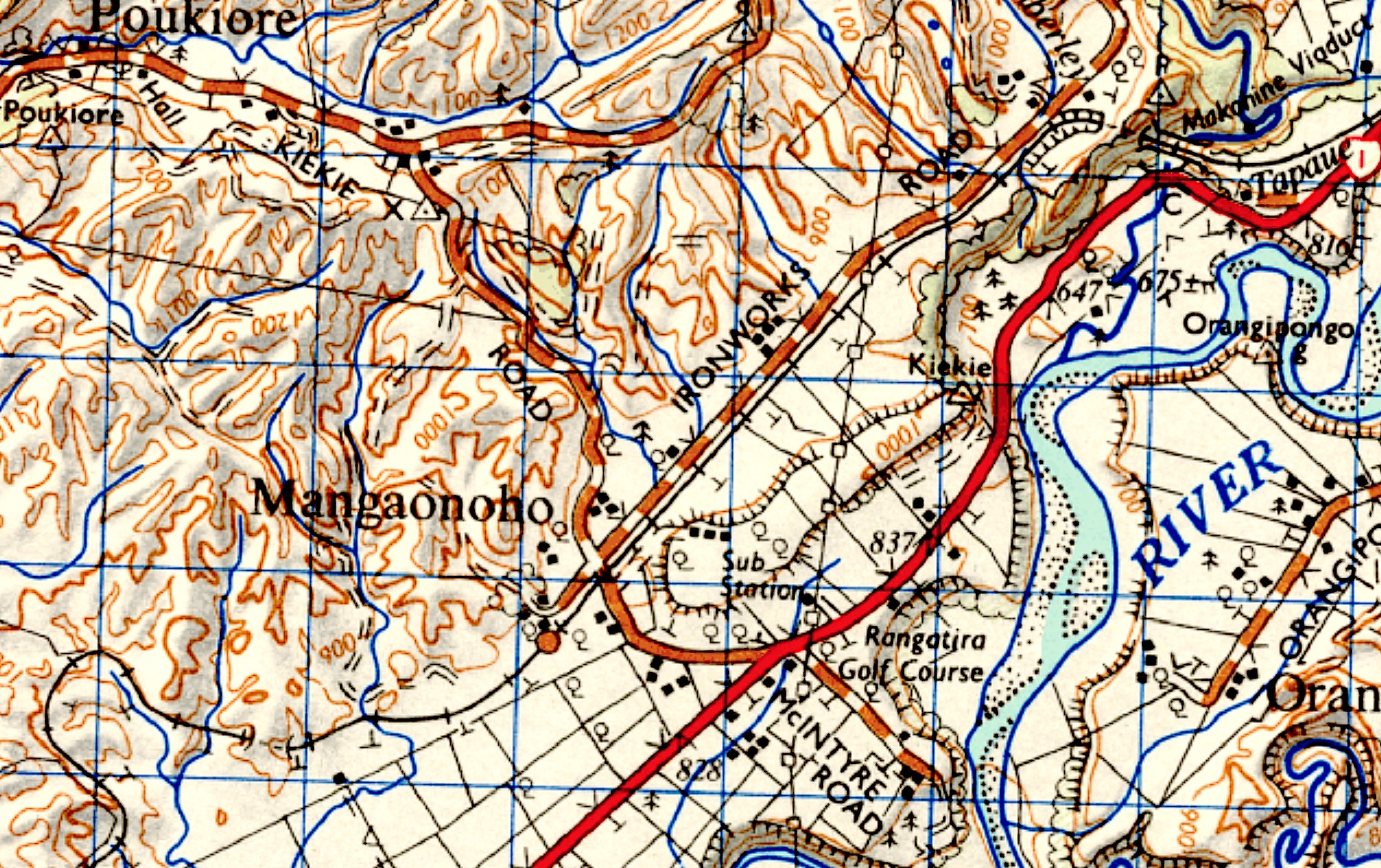
- Mangaonoho station on 1979 map

General information
- Location: New Zealand
- Coordinates: 39.879220°S 175.663190°E
- Elevation: 257 m (843 ft)
- Line: North Island Main Trunk
- Distance: Wellington 216.04 km (134.24 mi)

History
- Opened: 14 April 1893
- Closed: 31 January 1982
- Electrified: June 1988

Services
Preceding station	Historical railways	Following station
Ōhingaiti; Line open, station closed 6.1 km (3.8 mi)	North Island Main Trunk; KiwiRail	Kaikarangi; Line open, station closed 6.42 km (3.99 mi)
Location

Mangaonoho railway station was a station on the North Island Main Trunk in New Zealand. For almost a decade, from 1893 to 1902, Mangaonoho was important as the northern terminus of the NIMT's southern section; even a refreshment room was planned. The route north was delayed by construction of major viaducts, the first being Makōhine. To build Makōhine a railway workshop was set up just north of Mangaonoho. Unlike many other NIMT construction camps, Mangaonoho gradually declined after the line was completed. By 1911 the population was down to 167. Decline continued, with removal of the stockyards in 1973 and closure in 1982. There is now only a single line through the former station site.

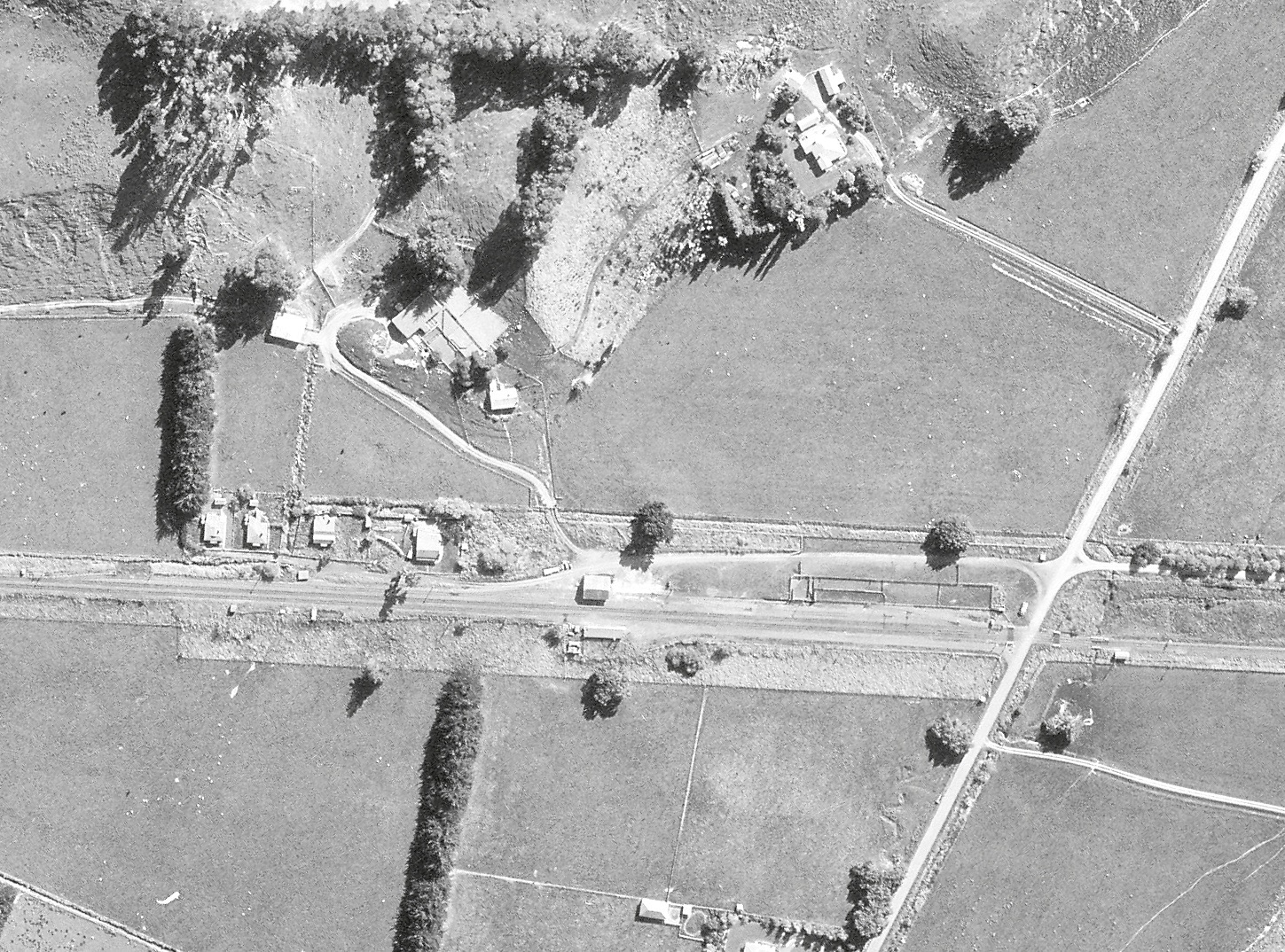
Mangaonoho in 1964

The New Zealand Ministry for Culture and Heritage gives a translation of "the stream of Noho" for Mangaonoho.

== History ==
A platelayer's cottage and siding were built in 1892, and a sawmill was moved to the station in 1893.

The 3 mi 70 ch (6.2 km) extension from Kaikarangi (or Rangatira as it then was) was contracted to Cleghorn, Forest, and Magee of Auckland, in 1890, for £26,499 and vested in the Railway Commissioners on 14 April 1893, regular services ran from Monday 1 May 1893 and a daily train ran from 4 December 1893. However, the contract for building the station was only let in March 1893, work was in progress on building the 4th class station by June that year and it continued into 1895. The stationmaster's house was completed in 1895, as was a windmill for water-supply. There was also an engine shed, with an F Class 0-6-0T stabled there, a 63 ft (19 m) by 32 ft (9.8 m) goods shed, a loading bank, cattle and sheep yards. A crane was added in 1897. A post office opened at the station on 6 June 1894. There was a tablet and fixed signals. A crossing loop could take 99 wagons.

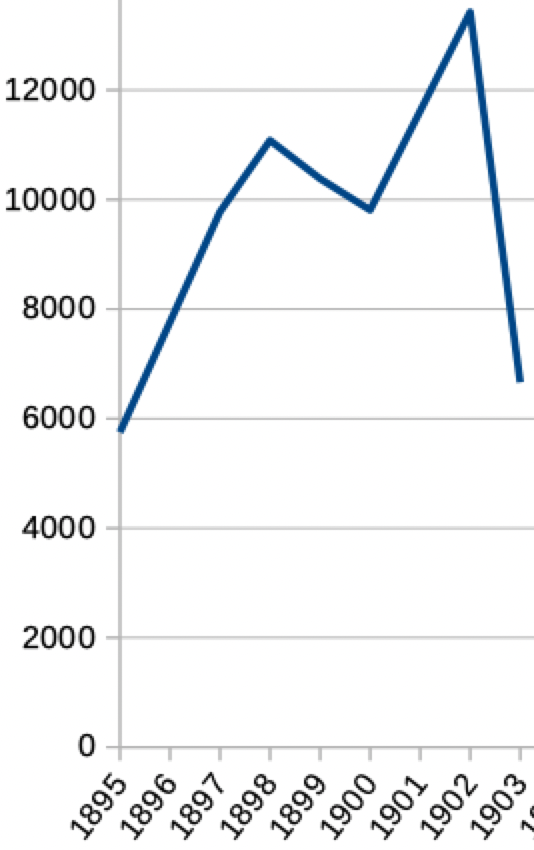
tickets sales 1895–1904 – derived from annual returns to Parliament of "Statement of Revenue for each Station for the Year ended"

Mangaonoho became an accounting station on 27 April 1894 after a telegraph line was built from Hunterville. It then had 3 staff and sold 5,752 tickets in the year to 31 March 1895.

From 1 November 1894 the Hunterville branch had two trains a day each way to this timetable for the 22 mi 29 ch (36.0 km) to Marton -

- Mangaonoho, depart daily, 6.40 a.m., Hunterville, 7.15 a.m., and Marton arrive 8 30 a.m.
- Mangaonoho, depart Tuesday, Wednesday, Friday, 12.40 p.m., Hunterville 1.15 p.m., and Marton arrive 2 30 p.m.
- Mangaonoho, depart Thursday and Saturday, 4.50 p.m., Hunterville, 5.25 p.m., and Marton arrive 6.40 p.m.
- Marton, depart daily, 9.35 a.m, Hunterville 11 a m., and Mangaonoho arrive 11.30 am.
- Marton depart Tuesday, Wednesday, and Friday 3.15 p.m., Hunterville 4.40 p.m., and Mangaonoho arrive 5.10 pm.
- Marton depart Thursday and Saturday 7.25 p m., Hunterville 8.30 p.m, and Mangaonoho arrive 9,30 p.m.

The journey was shortened to about 90 minutes when the new Marton station opened at the junction in 1898.

By 1902 the staff had increased to 6, the tickets to 13,425 and 1,726,600 board feet (4,074 m^{3}), or superficial feet of timber were railed from Mangaonoho that year. Mangaonoho didn't feature in revenue statements after 1904, when the staff was down to 1, though 6,662 tickets had been sold in 1903, but only 33,000 board feet (78 m^{3}) of timber were railed out.

Decline started when the line opened to Mangaweka on 16 August 1902. Mangaonoho became a flag station and lost its stationmaster from 3 November 1902. The Post Office was removed on 16 January 1903, though reopened in 1908 and finally closed on 25 February 1963. Part of the goods shed was moved to Hunterville in 1906, leaving a 40 ft (12 m) by 30 ft (9.1 m) shed. In 1911 one cottage was moved to Te Wera and another to Whangamōmoana – requesting authority £131.10.0.Approval to remove the station building was given in 1971. On 19 September 1986 the station closed to all traffic.

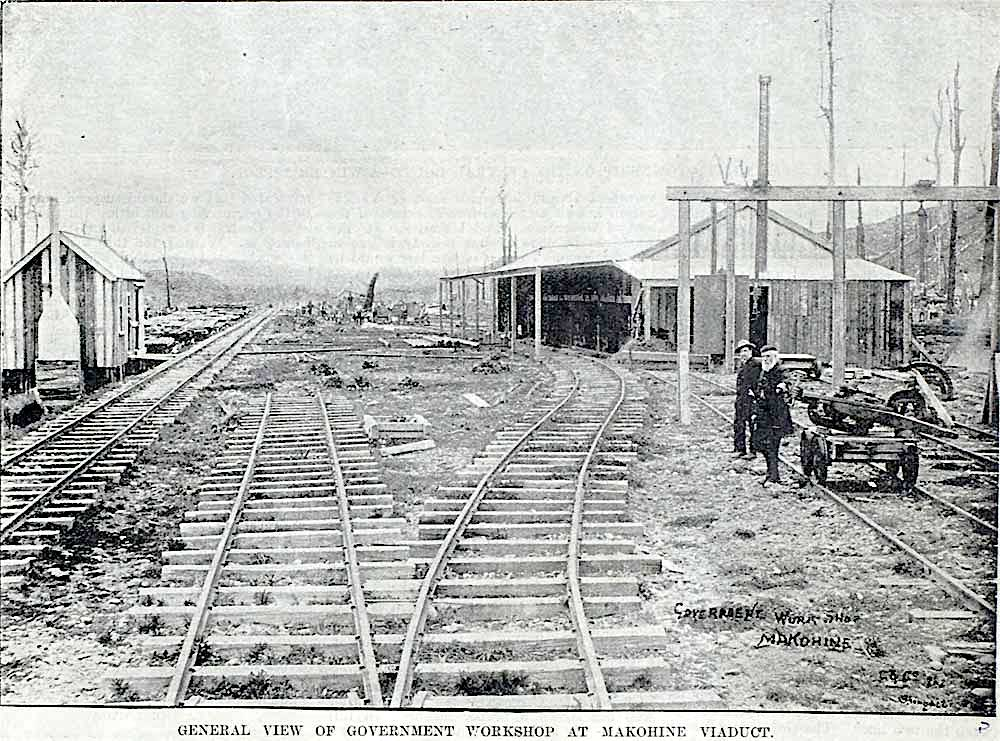
Mangaonoho workshop in 1902

=== Workshop ===
Mangaonoho Public Works Department workshop opened in 1896, 1.37 km (0.85 mi) to the north of the station, on what was Waterfall Rd (now Ironworks Rd), where a passing loop for 67 wagons remains. The works was fully operational from late 1898. Electricity lit the track and workshop to allow 16-hour working days. All the steelwork for the Makōhine Viaduct was ready in 1900. Up to 300 were employed in building the viaduct. Two of them died in accidents.

In 1901 the workshop was also preparing steelwork for the Mangaweka Viaduct. It later prepared the steel for Taonui and Hapuawhenua viaducts, opened in 1908.

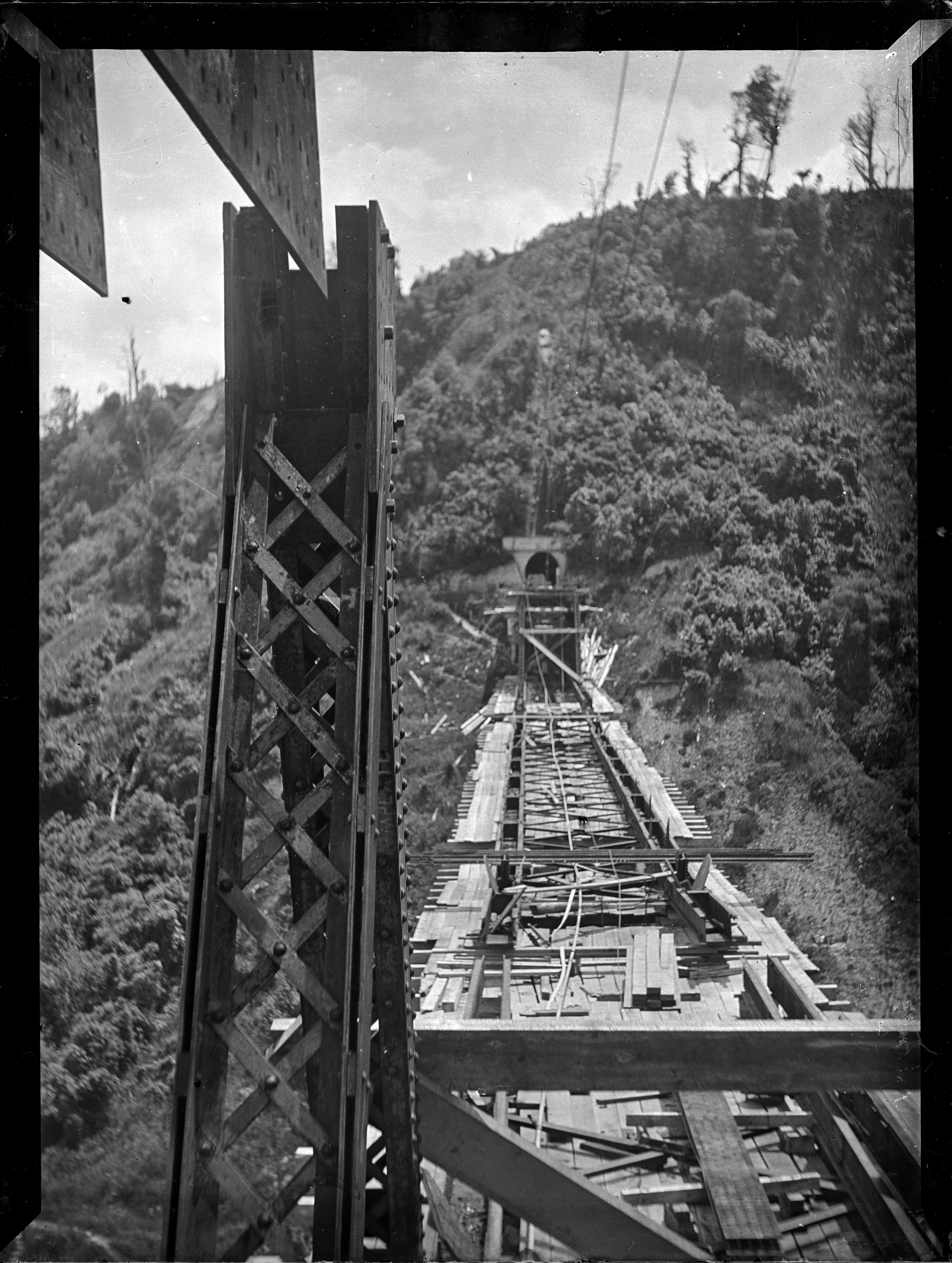
Makōhine Viaduct, c1900, with the tunnel beyond

=== Makōhine Tunnel ===
A further 1.83 km (1.14 mi) north of the workshop, the 198 yd (181 m) long Makōhine tunnel was finished in 1894, after 14 months of construction, allowing the rails to reach the edge of the Makōhine gorge, for easy access to the viaduct site. The lining of the tunnel was completed in August, except about 15 ft kept open to enable the men to run the cutting to spoil. It was 16 ft 10 in (5.13 m) high and 10 ft 4 in (3.15 m) wide (at the bottom). The walls were thick concrete, with an arch of concrete blocks. It was constructed by co-operative labour, who suffered no accidents. However, a mother and four children died when a spoil heap from the tunnel cutting collapsed on them. The tunnel was daylighted in 1984, prior to electrification.

Makōhine viaduct
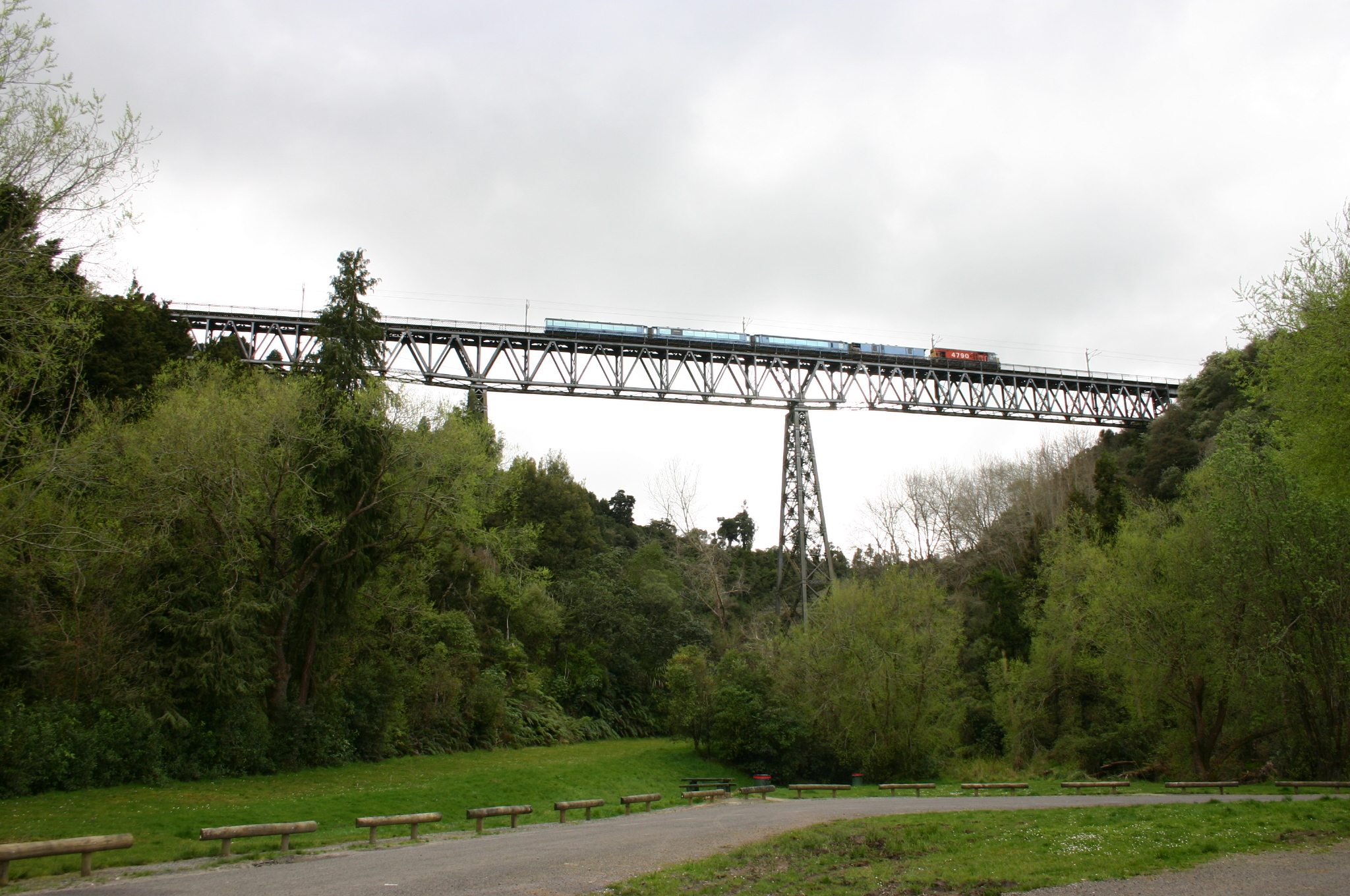
- Overlander train crossing the Makōhine Viaduct
- Coordinates: 39.869771°S 175.682708°E
- Carries: Single track of the North Island Main Trunk
- Crosses: Makōhine Stream
- Owner: KiwiRail

Characteristics
- Design: Two steel trestle piers, two 75 metres (246 ft) steel Warren trusses and a central 53 metres (174 ft) truss.
- Material: Steel
- Total length: 228 metres (748 ft)
- Height: 72 metres (236 ft)
- No. of spans: 3

History
- Engineering design by: Public Works Department
- Constructed by: PWD
- Construction start: 1896
- Opened: 17 June 1902

Heritage New Zealand – Category 1
- Designated: 2 April 1985
- Reference no.: 32

Location
- Interactive map of Makōhine viaduct

=== Makōhine Viaduct ===
Very close to the former tunnel, Makōhine is the southernmost of the five largest NIMT viaducts. It spans the Makōhine Stream, which flows into the Rangitīkei River just over a kilometre downstream. Like the river, the stream is incised into the soft late Pliocene to early Pleistocene sediments, which are part of the Whanganui Basin.

Although the rails had reached the gorge in 1894, it wasn't until February 1896 that tenders were called. They exceeded expectations, which were £30,000 to £50,000, so PWD also used worker co-operatives for this contract. Further delays were caused by a steel strike in Britain (1,272 tonnes of steel were used) and heavy rain on the unstable soil, which affected pier foundations in 1897 and flooded the gravel pit in 1898. It wasn't until 1900 that pier construction began. The spans are longer than other NIMT viaducts to minimise the piers needed. The viaduct was opened by the Minister of Public Works, William Hall-Jones, on 17 June 1902.

The viaduct was strengthened around 1932 to allow for the heavier K class, by adding intermediate vertical struts to the Warren trusses of the two main spans. The viaduct was again strengthened in the early 1980s to prepare for electrification, by replacing the smaller end spans, replacing wooden beams supporting the track with steel, and adding links to transmit traction and braking forces into the main structure.

=== Mangaonoho deviation ===
As the 1979 map above shows, the line to the south of Mangaonoho largely curved around the contours. No.19 tunnel was daylighted in 1972, on the section of line later bypassed. A $1,403,897 1984 contract by John McLachlan Ltd. covered the deviation, which straightened the line and bypassed No.8 tunnel with a large cutting at a lower level, built by Ian A. Martin Ltd at a cost of $853,461.
