= Kaikarangi railway station =

Defunct railway station in New Zealand

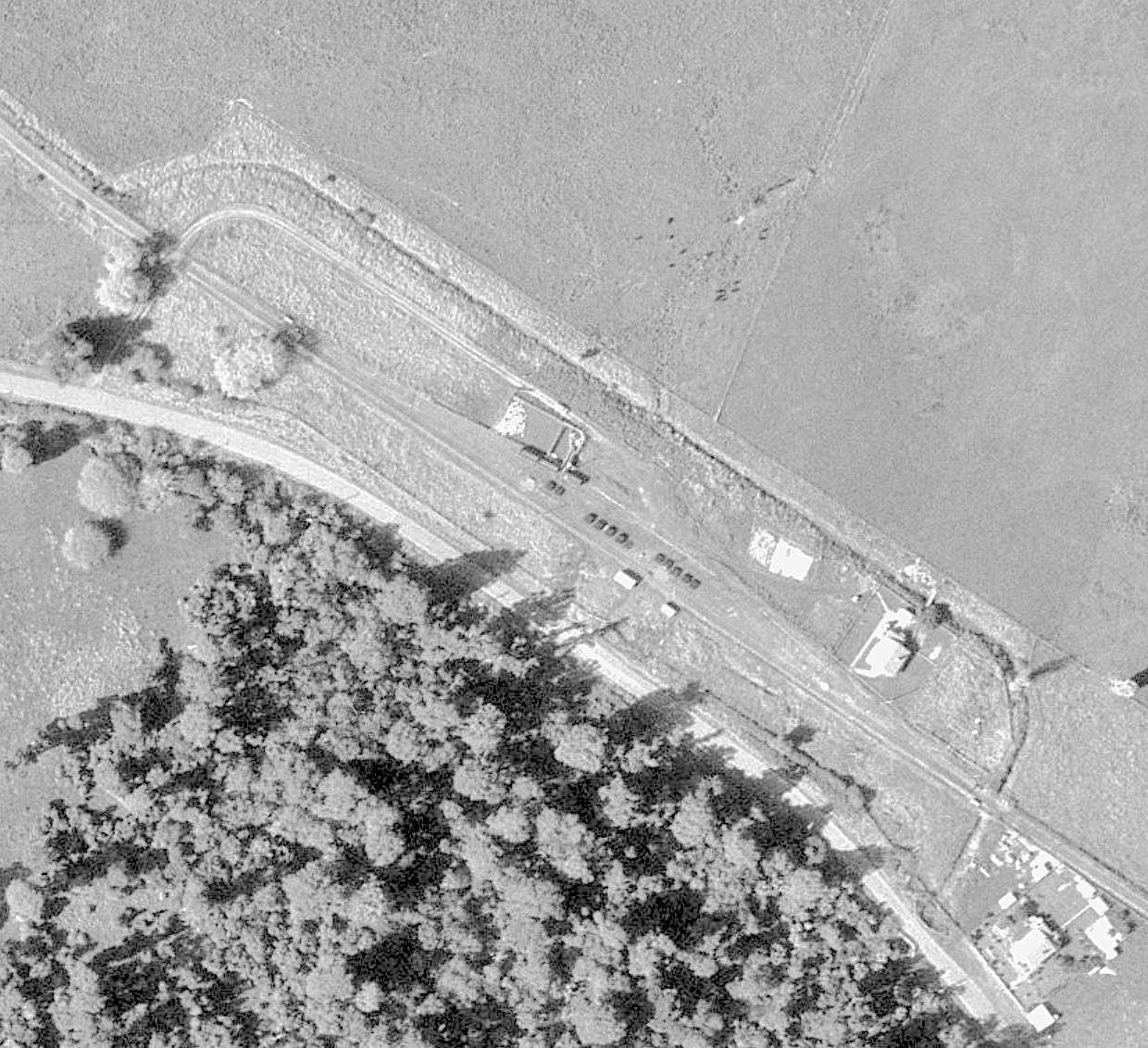
- Kaikarangi railway station in 1964

General information
- Location: New Zealand
- Coordinates: 39.905516°S 175.601483°E
- Elevation: 283 m (928 ft)
- Line: North Island Main Trunk
- Distance: Wellington 209.62 km (130.25 mi)

History
- Opened: 2 June 1888
- Closed: Passengers 10 August 1959; Goods 10 October 1971
- Electrified: June 1988
- Former names: Rangatira until 25 July 1909

Services
Preceding station	Historical railways	Following station
Mangaonoho; Line open, station closed 6.42 km (3.99 mi)	North Island Main Trunk; KiwiRail	Hunterville; Line open, station closed 4.29 km (2.67 mi)
Location

Kaikarangi railway station was a station on the North Island Main Trunk in New Zealand. The line opened just as the government responded to the recession by ending all contracts to build the railway, so, from 1888 to 1893, Kaikarangi was the northern terminus of the NIMT's southern section. the station had a shelter shed, platform, cart approach and a passing loop for 22 wagons. A house was added in 1918 and by 1959 there was a loading bank and stockyards. By then it was reported that traffic in wagon lots was light and the siding mainly used to hold portions of trains in emergencies when they stalled on the Mangaonoho – Kaikarangi Bank. There is now only a single line through the former station site.
