= Bliss-stick =

- Company type: Privately owned company
- Industry: Kayaking
- Founded: ??
- Headquarters: Taihape, New Zealand
- Number of locations: New Zealand, Australia, USA, UK, Canada, Japan
- Products: Kayaks
- Services: Kayak manufacture and sales
- Website: {

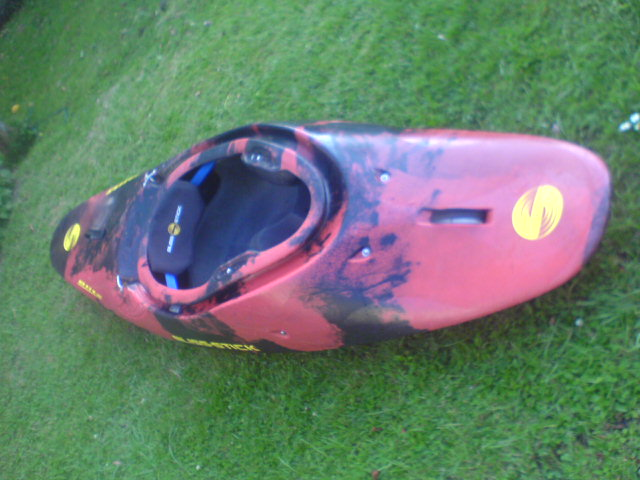
A "Blitz", one of the earliest and most famous Bliss-stick kayaks.

Bliss-stick is a company that makes whitewater kayaks. The company is based in Pukeokahu in the Rangitikei District. Once a significant exporter, in 2014 they had turned to domestic production due to exchange rates.
