= Silverhope railway station =

Railway station in New Zealand

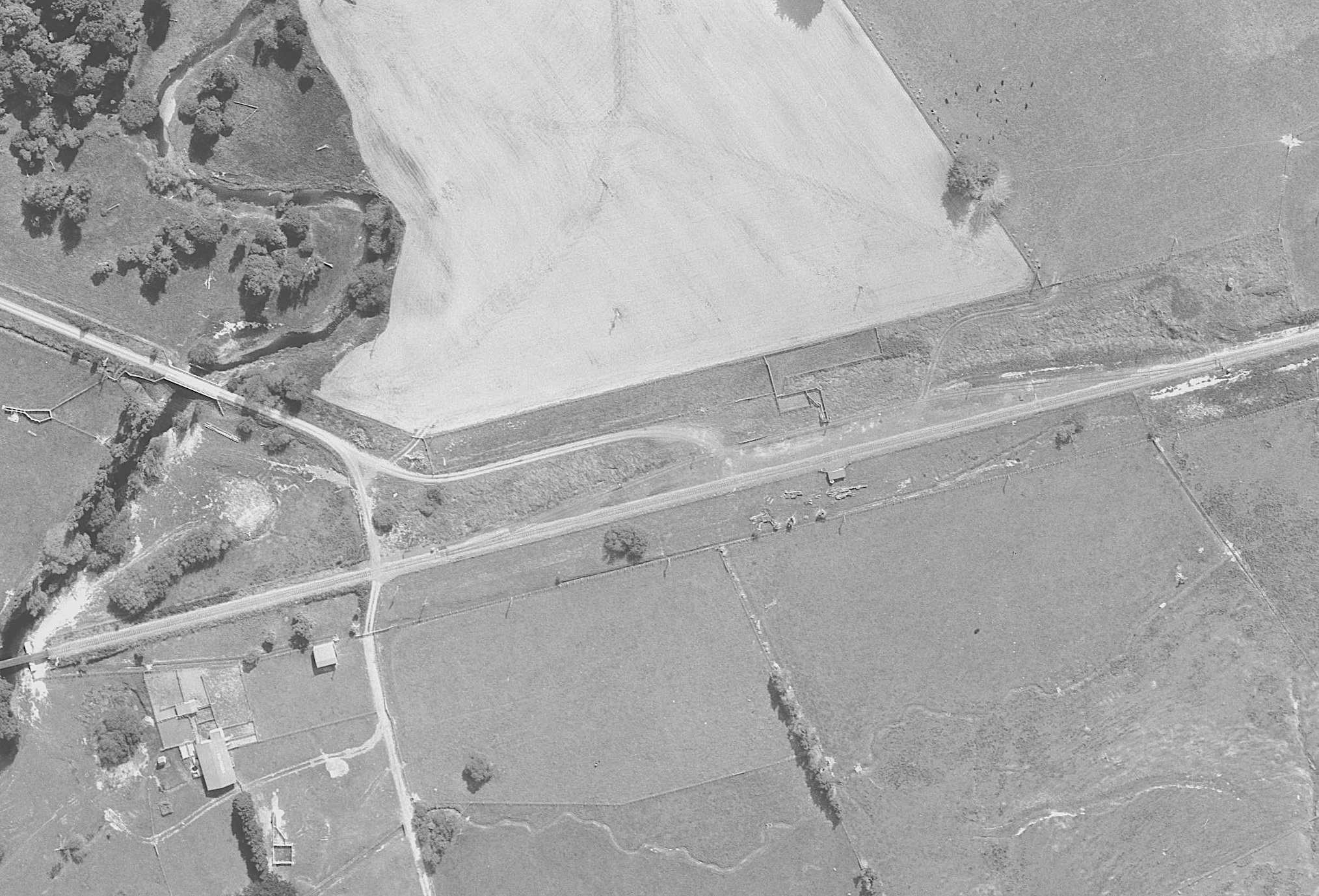
- Silverhope railway station in 1971

General information
- Location: New Zealand
- Coordinates: 39.965741°S 175.529723°E
- Elevation: 224 m (735 ft)
- Line: North Island Main Trunk
- Distance: Wellington 200.28 km (124.45 mi)

History
- Opened: 19 October 1887
- Closed: passengers by 19 June 1959 goods 24 October 1971
- Electrified: June 1988

Services
Preceding station	Historical railways	Following station
Hunterville; Line open, station closed 5.05 km (3.14 mi)	North Island Main Trunk; KiwiRail	Rata; Line open, station closed 4.82 km (3.00 mi)
Location

Silverhope railway station was a station on the North Island Main Trunk in New Zealand, 12 mi 9 ch (19.5 km) from Marton. Goods were first carried to the station on 19 October 1887, though the official opening of the 15 mi 57 ch (25.3 km) Marton to Hunterville section wasn't until Saturday 2 June 1888, when the station was served by two trains a week, reported as losing £15 a week. A Certificate of Inspection for the line was issued on Wednesday, 6 June 1888.

Construction of the line from Marton to Silverhope was under the £27,300 Porewa Contract, for which tenders were sought in March 1885. In May 1885 James Johnston, the contractor, was blamed for only employing 60 navvies, rather than about 200. The contractor's sureties were approached by government in August 1885 and in September 1885 the navvies were laid off. The contract was relet to Mr Howe, who completed it about 2 months late. It was due to such problems, that works further up the line were mostly let to worker cooperatives.

Silverhope had a population of 174 in 1901, which had declined to 55 by 1911. In 1905 it had two sawmills, cutting rimu, mataī, and kahikatea, which was sent to Marton. One mill moved to Taihape in 1907, but there was still one mill here in 1958.

Silverhope was named after London merchant, Stephen William Silver, after whom Silvertown in London is also named. About 1879, he bought the 6,000 acres (2,400 ha) property and converted it from bush to farming.

By 1896 Silverhope had a shelter shed, passenger platform, cart approach, urinals and a passing loop for 21 wagons. Stockyards were added in 1908.

The bridge over the Porewa Stream, just south of the station, was damaged by a flood in 1904. A slip blocked the line in 1907.

A report on 19 June 1959 said there was no passenger, parcels, or outwards small lots goods traffic and only three inwards loads of livestock, potatoes, and manure in the previous two years. The station closed on 24 October 1971 and tenders were called for removal of buildings in 1972.

Little remains of what was always a very small station. Only a single track runs through the station site.

The nearby Bruce Park Scenic Reserve, with a memorial to Robert Bruce, has a short walkway through it.
