= Pukeokahu =

- Rural community
- Interactive map of Pukeokahu
- Coordinates: 39.618°S 176.005°E
- Country: New Zealand
- Region: Manawatū-Whanganui
- Territorial authority: Rangitikei District
- Wards: Northern General Ward; Tiikeitia ki Uta (Inland) Māori Ward
- Community: Taihape Community
- Electorates: Rangitīkei; Te Tai Hauāuru (Māori)

Government
  - Territorial Authority: Rangitikei District Council
  - Regional council: Horizons Regional Council
  - Mayor of Rangitikei: Andy Watson
  - Rangitīkei MP: Suze Redmayne
  - Te Tai Hauāuru MP: Debbie Ngarewa-Packer

Area
  - Total: 132.37 km^{2} (51.11 sq mi)

Population (2023 Census)
  - Total: 138
  - Density: 1.04/km^{2} (2.70/sq mi)

Pukeokahu is a rural community in the Rangitikei District and Manawatū-Whanganui region of New Zealand's North Island.

It centres around popular spot on the Rangitīkei River, at River Valley Lodge, which is used for rafting, swimming, brown trout fishing and picnics. The condition of the spot changes from week to week, there is ongoing overall bacteria risk for swimmers. Kayak manufacturer Bliss-stick is based here.

The River Valley Lodge offers guided rafting, wooden boat tours, and horse treks. It has also partnered with the Māori owners of the Aorangi Mountain to the west to provide one-day hiking trips. However, the company often struggles to recruit rafting guides due to the area's isolation and lack of housing.

== Geography ==
The Pukeokahu area includes Pukeokahu Station farm, a 978-hectare (2,420-acre) site next to the Rangitīkei River, dominated by Pukeokahu Hill. The top of the hills is 983 metres above sea level, with sharp drops to the river, Okoeke and Ngutuwhero Streams and rolling countryside. The farm holds 10,000 stock, including sheep, cattle, and deer. The farm was sold to Germany investors in 2012 for $8.7 million.

Other prominent farms include Kaiangaroa Station, a 1,278-hectare (3,160-acre) sheep-and-beef property, and Mangaohane Station, 4800 hectare sheep and cattle farm wintering 44,000 stock.

There are also several Māori land blocks in the area, including the 1,493-hectare (3,690-acre) site to the north shared by 74 owners, and a 5,125-hectare (12,660-acre) site directly east across the river from the River Valley Lodge, which has 400 registered owners.

== History ==
The area was struck by destructive snow storms in 2002 and 2017.

An annual race between a horse and a human has been held in Pukeokahu since 2015, based on a Welsh event started in 1980.

In 2016, fashion designer Kate Megaw credited her upbringing in Pukeokahu as the inspiration for her show at New Zealand Fashion Week.

A summer storm in late 2018 pushed farm silt and sediment into the river, depleting farm topsoil and feeding river weeds.

== Demographics ==
Pukeokahu locality covers 132.37 km^{2} (51.11 sq mi). This also includes Taoroa Junction. It is part of the larger Mokai Patea statistical area.

Historical population
Year	Pop.	±% p.a.
2006	165	—
2013	144	−1.93%
2018	144	+0.00%
2023	138	−0.85%

Pukeokahu had a population of 138 in the 2023 New Zealand census, a decrease of 6 people (−4.2%) since the 2018 census, and a decrease of 6 people (−4.2%) since the 2013 census. There were 66 males and 72 females in 57 dwellings. The median age was 34.9 years (compared with 38.1 years nationally). There were 30 people (21.7%) aged under 15 years, 24 (17.4%) aged 15 to 29, 63 (45.7%) aged 30 to 64, and 18 (13.0%) aged 65 or older.

People could identify as more than one ethnicity. The results were 91.3% European (Pākehā), 28.3% Māori, 4.3% Pasifika, and 2.2% Asian. English was spoken by 95.7%, and Māori by 4.3%. No language could be spoken by 2.2% (e.g. too young to talk). The percentage of people born overseas was 10.9, compared with 28.8% nationally.

Religious affiliations were 30.4% Christian, and 2.2% New Age. People who answered that they had no religion were 60.9%, and 6.5% of people did not answer the census question.

Of those at least 15 years old, 24 (22.2%) people had a bachelor's or higher degree, 69 (63.9%) had a post-high school certificate or diploma, and 9 (8.3%) people exclusively held high school qualifications. The median income was $40,400, compared with $41,500 nationally. 9 people (8.3%) earned over $100,000 compared to 12.1% nationally. The employment status of those at least 15 was 66 (61.1%) full-time and 18 (16.7%) part-time.

== Education ==
Pukeokahu School is a co-educational state primary school for Year 1 to 8 students, with a roll of 5 as of July 2026. It opened in 1902 and moved to the current site in 1903.

The school looks out over Mt Aorangi and Pukeokahu Hill. It holds annual pet days and has held annual horse treks since 2001.

Richie McCaw visited the school by helicopter in 2011 after the school won a national competition.

In 2017, the school's sole charge principal travelled regularly from 20 kilometres (12 mi) outside Feilding. The school applied for a new sole charge principal in 2020.
