= Utiku railway station =

Defunct railway station in New Zealand

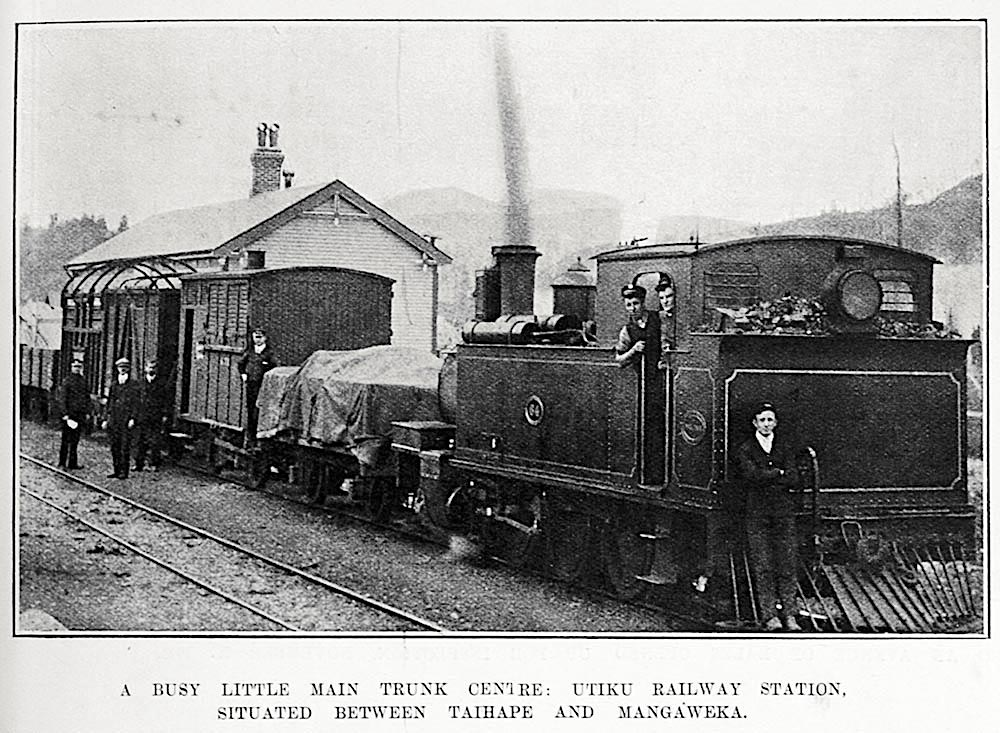
- Utiku railway station in 1908

General information
- Location: New Zealand
- Coordinates: 39.736125°S 175.842999°E
- Elevation: 371 m (1,217 ft)
- Line: North Island Main Trunk
- Distance: Wellington 243.69 km (151.42 mi)

History
- Opened: 27 May 1904
- Closed: Passengers 31 January 1982; Goods 31 October 1986
- Electrified: June 1988

Services
Preceding station	Historical railways	Following station
Ohotu; Line open, station closed 3.4 km (2.1 mi)	North Island Main Trunk; KiwiRail	Mangaweka; Line open, station closed 12.65 km (7.86 mi)
Location

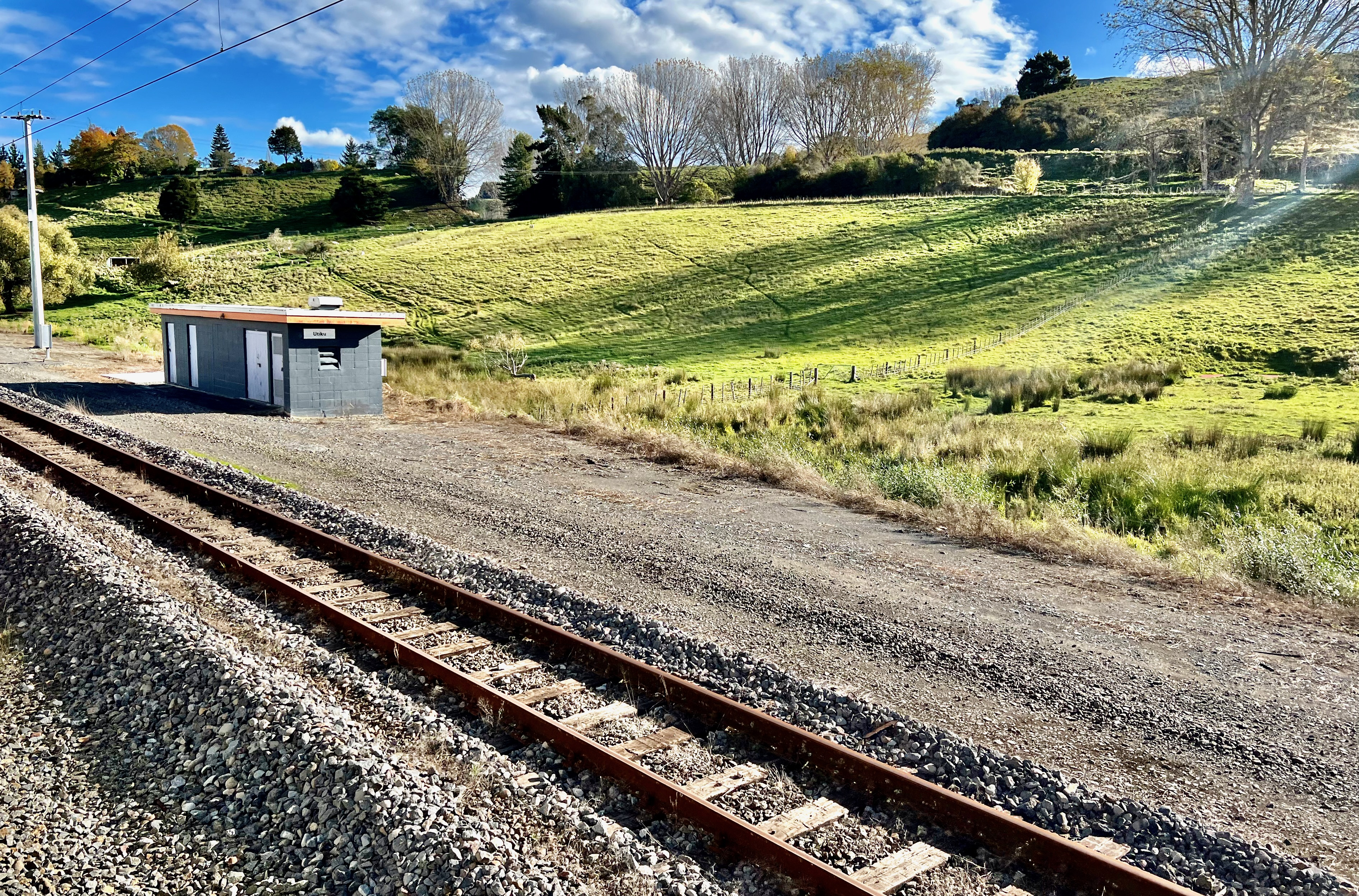
Utiku station site in 2023

Utiku railway station was a station on the North Island Main Trunk in New Zealand, and in the Manawatū-Whanganui region. It opened in 1904 and closed in 1986. It was part of the 13 1/2 mi (21.7 km) Mangaweka to Taihape section, officially opened by the Prime Minister, Richard Seddon, on 21 November 1904. It closed in 1986. A passing loop remains.

== Name ==
Utiku was named after Utiku Pōtaka, a prominent rangatira (chief) of Ngāti Hauiti based in the Rangitīkei–Manawatū-Whanganui region. The name Utiku is a Māori transliteration of the biblical name Eutychus.

== History ==
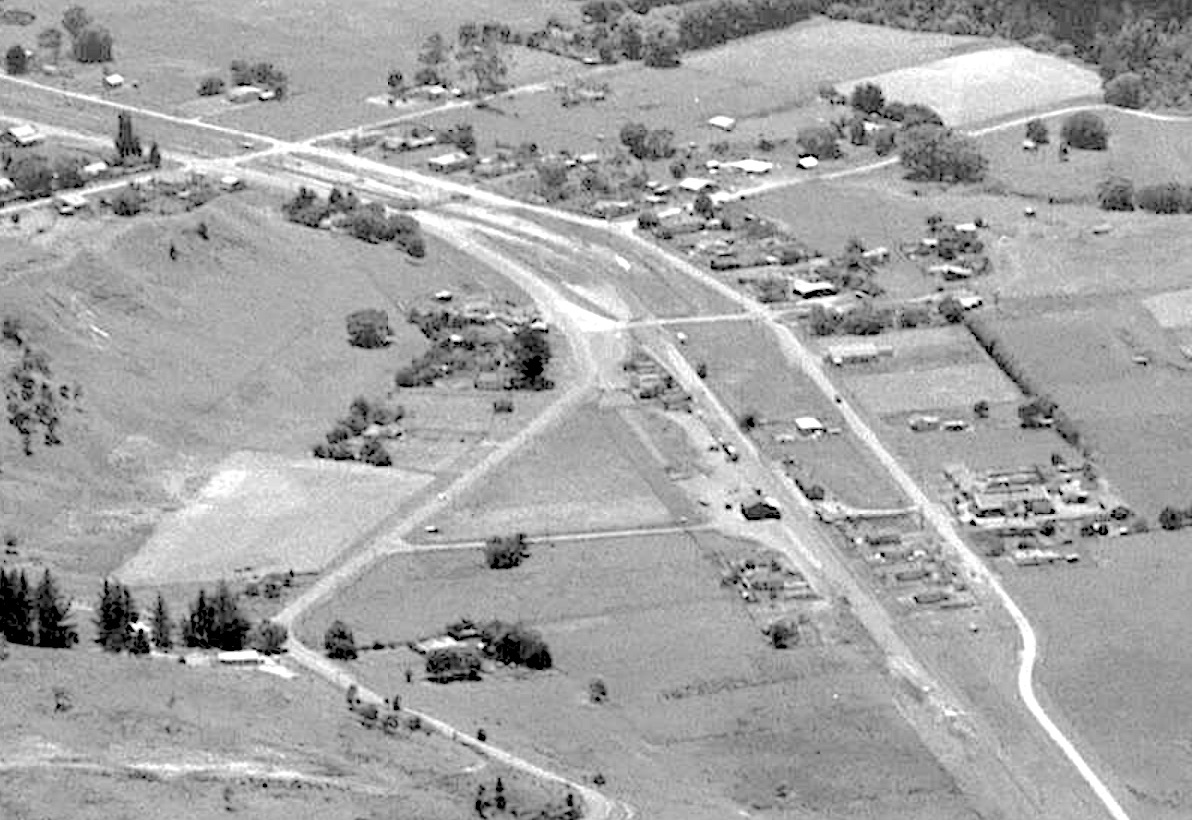
Utiku from the south in 1957

The station was planned in 1902, when work on the line had reached Utiku. Tenders were put out in August 1903, track had been laid as far as Toi Toi Viaduct by February 1904 and the 7 mi 75 ch (12.8 km) extension from Mangaweka to Utiku opened for goods traffic on Friday, 27 May 1904. though worked by the Public Works Department. Goods were worked through to Taihape from 4 August 1904. On Saturday, 10 September 1904 Utiku opened for passengers as a flag station, with a shelter shed and platform. Three days later a contract was let to Russell & Bignell of Whanganui for £1203.5s to build the station, which was ready by 21 February 1905. In 1906 a 40 ft (12 m) by 30 ft (9.1 m) goods shed was added. It had a cart approach, loading bank, cattle and sheep yards, fixed signals and a passing loop for 50 wagons, which was extended to 100 wagons in 1970 and 126 by 1980. Due to growing business, the station was enlarged and a stationmaster appointed in 1907. A telephone was added in 1909.

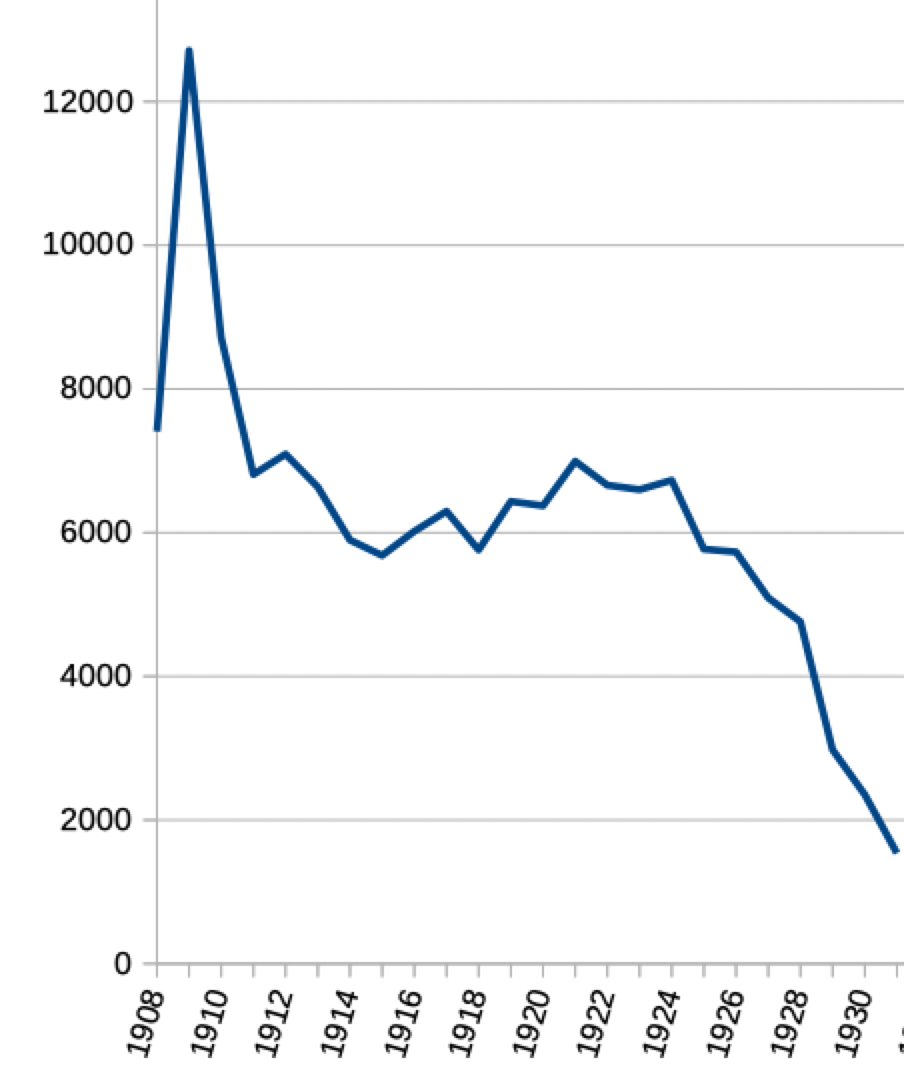
tickets sales 1908–1930 – derived from annual returns to Parliament of "Statement of Revenue for each Station for the Year ended"

Utiku was important enough to have annual returns of its traffic recorded, as was Taihape to the north and Hunterville to the south. For example, it had 6,599 passengers in 1923, but was 4th largest on NIMT in terms of sheep and pig inwards traffic and still had a substantial timber trade, both inwards and outwards.

On 31 January 1982 the station closed to all but Ravensdown fertiliser in wagon lots and to that on 31 October 1986.

In 2017 a bank to the south of the station was strengthened with shotcrete and soil nails.

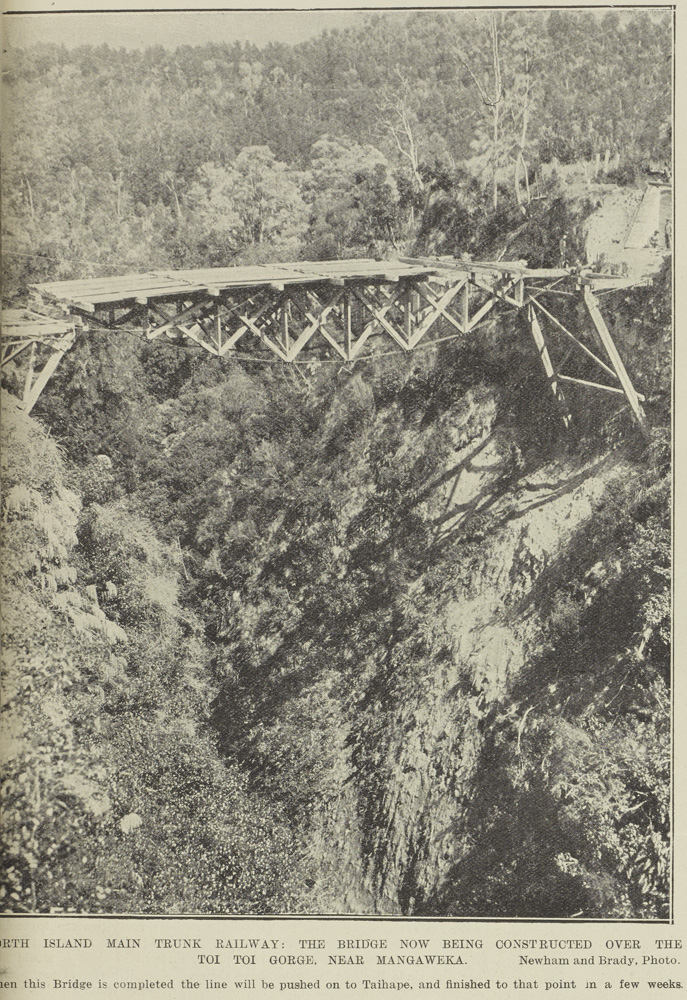
Toi Toi Viaduct under construction in 1904

== Toi Toi Viaduct ==
Toi Toi Viaduct lies about 3 km (1.9 mi) south of Utiku. It is 59 m (194 ft) long and up to 58 m (190 ft) above the Toi Toi Creek. The contract for the steelwork went to Scott Bros of Christchurch. Work on the viaduct was under the cooperative system. It was completed in February 1904 and tested in September 1904. It is one of the few dating from that era, though it was strengthened in 1934. The Mangaweka deviation of 1981 starts just south of the viaduct.

== Timber ==
When the railway opened the area was still extensively forested. Like other stations along this part of NIMT, this station had freight from several timber mills.

On 11 May 1904, before the line opened, Albert Gibbs applied for a siding at Utiku. A cable of the tramway suspension bridge, which led to their mill, broke in 1912, resulting in the mill being shut until a new bridge, mill and tramway opened in 1914, the plans having been drawn in 1913. Similar collapses occurred in 1904 and 1920, though no one was killed then. The 1914 bridge was replaced in 1961. Only the northern tower of the 1914 bridge remains. In 1922 the Gibbs Bros butter box factory was blown down. It finally burnt down in 1927.

Knight's had a siding 52 ch (1.0 km) north of the station from 1904, when they planned a 7 mi (11 km) tramway. Perham & Larsen also had a mill north of the station, until they moved to Rangataua in 1909, and they and Manawatu Timber Co both had sidings in 1906. As the bush was depleted, mills closed. In 1909 there were 9 mills, but in 1911 only two.

== Incidents ==
In 1910 a landslip in a cutting near Utiku derailed a goods train. A freight train derailed in 2006 on the crossing loop, due to stiff couplings.
