= Ohingaiti railway station =

Defunct railway station in New Zealand

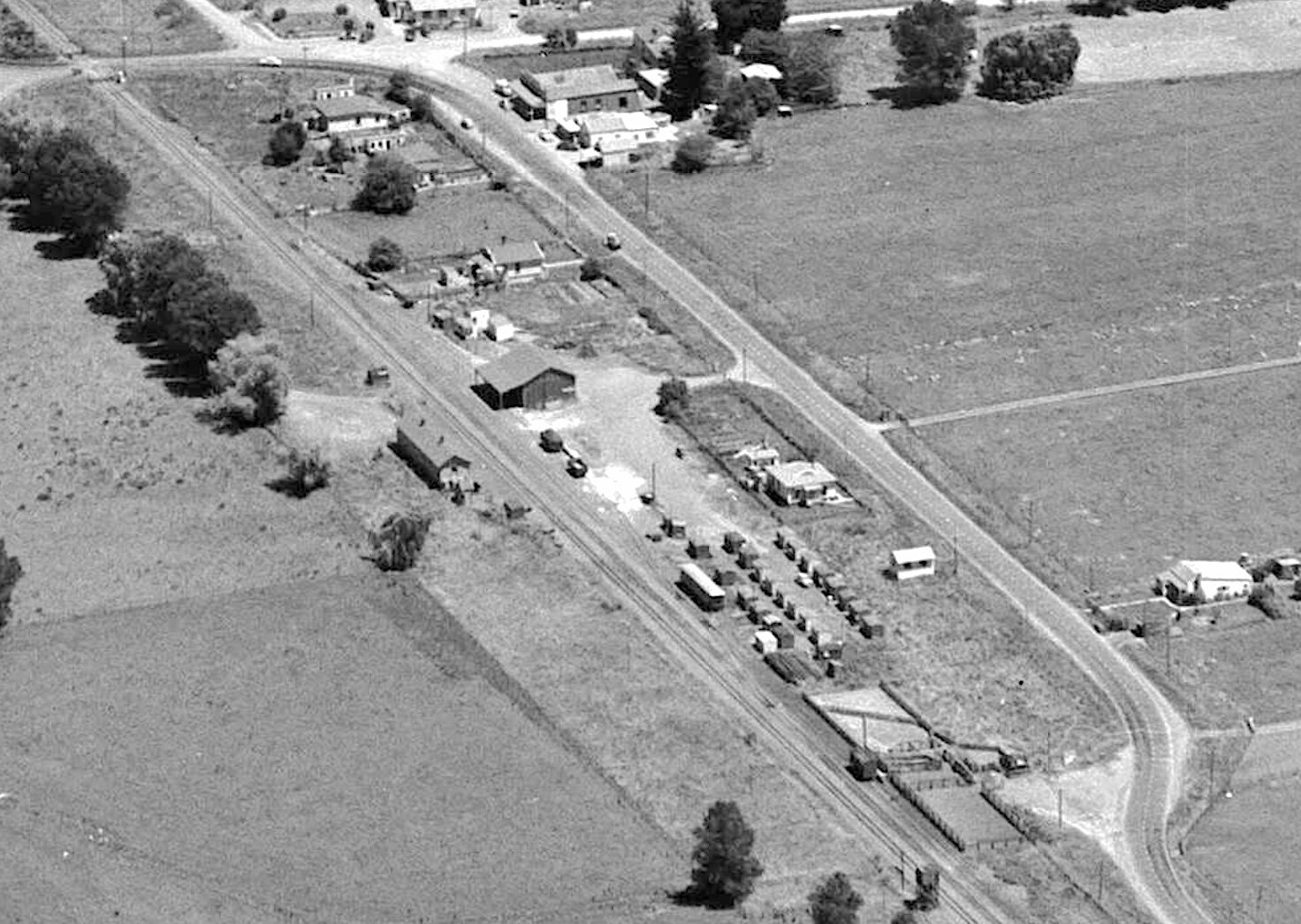
- Ohingaiti railway station in 1957

General information
- Location: New Zealand
- Coordinates: 39.861776°S 175.709629°E
- Elevation: 279 m (915 ft)
- Line: North Island Main Trunk
- Distance: Wellington 222.14 km (138.03 mi)

History
- Opened: 3 November 1902
- Closed: Passengers before December 1975; Goods 19 April 1986
- Electrified: June 1988

Services
| Preceding station | Historical railways | Following station |
|---|---|---|
| Mangaweka; Line open, station closed 8.9 km (5.5 mi) | North Island Main Trunk; KiwiRail | Mangaonoho; Line open, station closed 6.1 km (3.8 mi) |
Location

Ohingaiti railway station was a station on the North Island Main Trunk in New Zealand.

Contracts to build the line north of Ōhingaiti were being let in 1892. The line was in place by 1893, but remained unused for many years, until completion of the Makōhine Viaduct. The station site was cleared of bush in 1894 and fenced in 1896. Plans for a station and a ballast pit, 1 mi 21 ch (2.0 km) to the north, were made in 1901, with contracts signed by 18 February 1902.

Makōhine Viaduct was opened on 17 June 1902 and the special train ran on, via Ōhingaiti, to Mangaweka. Dates from 3 July to 30 August 1902 are mentioned for opening goods traffic on the 9 mi 20 ch (14.9 km) line from Mangaonoho to Mangaweka and 30 October for its inspection. New Zealand Railways (NZR) took the line over from the Public Works Department on Monday, 3 November 1902, when the stationmaster was transferred from Ōhingaiti to Mangaweka and Ōhingaiti was officially opened as a flag station, with a platform, privies, urinals, 85 wagon passing loop (extended to 100 wagons in 1973), loading bank, goods shed 41 ft x 31 ft, sheep and cattle yards. By November 1904 the platform had been asphalted and there was a stationmaster's house. A Post Office operated by Rys Department staff opened on 21 December 1902 and was moved from station on 19 May 1915. A soundproof room was provided for the telephone in 1908 and it was linked to the telephone exchange in 1916.

The village served by the station gradually shrank. In 1893 there were shops, hotels, a school and a sawmill. In 1901 the population was 464. By 1911 it was down to 342 and 104 in 1921.

The ballast pit closed in 1940 and the stockyards were removed in 1973. A goods shed, loading bank, passing loop and fertiliser siding remained in 1980, but the station closed to all but wagon loads on 21 July 1980 and to all traffic on Saturday, 19 April 1986.

There is now just a single line through the station site and nearly all traces of the old station have been lost, as State Highway 1 has been straightened across the old goods yard.

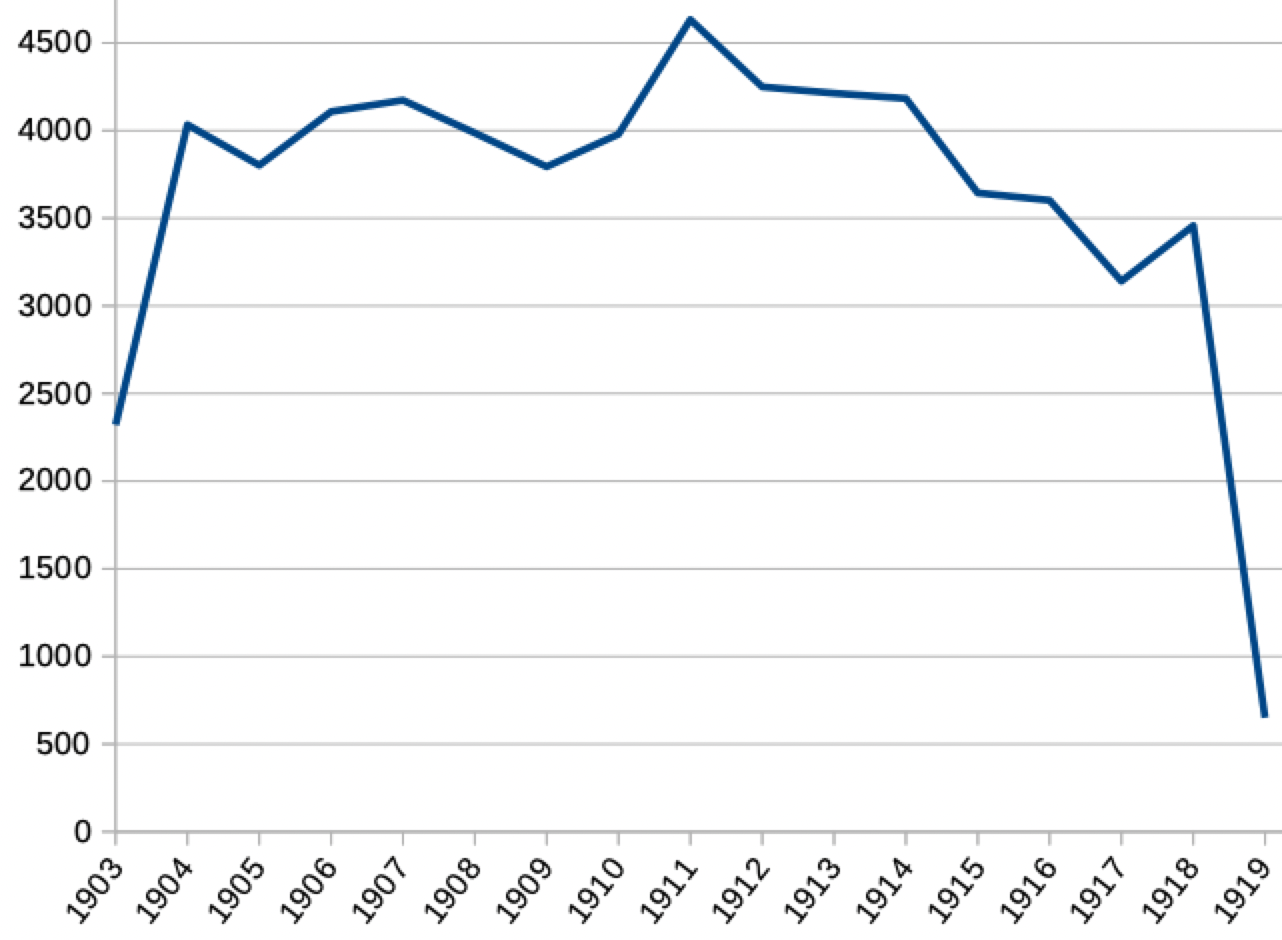
tickets sales 1903–1919 – derived from annual returns to Parliament of "Statement of Revenue for each Station for the Year ended"

== Otara Bridge ==
Otara Bridge is about 2 km (1.2 mi) southeast of Ōhingaiti is a suspension bridge, 10.2 m (33 ft) above the Rangitīkei River, rebuilt in 1962. It was officially reopened on 5 February after a $550,000 repair. The site was recognised as a good crossing point after the 1897 flood damaged Mangaweka bridge. The original 330 ft (100 m) suspension bridge opened in 1900.

== Okahupokia pā ==
Across the Rangitīkei River from Ōhingaiti, about 1 km (0.62 mi) northeast of Otara Bridge, Okahupokia pā is on a high, narrow ridge overlooking the river. It has a double ditch and bank, was built after 1500 by Ngati Hauiti and was listed as a Category 2 Historic Place on 24 June 2005.
