= Hunterville railway station =

Railway station in New Zealand

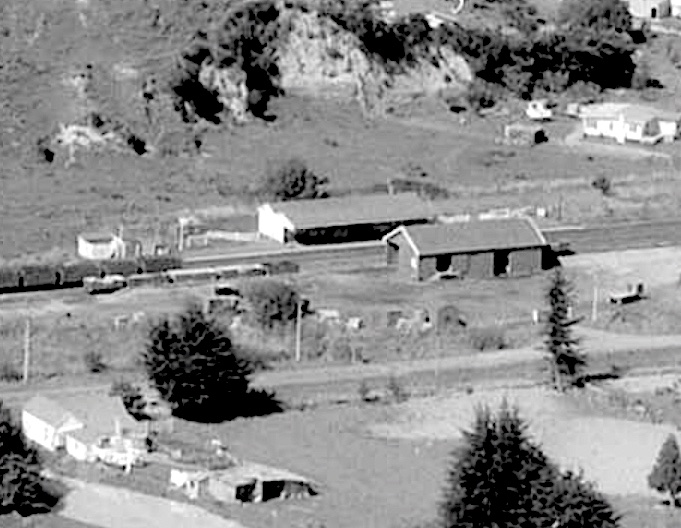
- Hunterville in 1965

General information
- Location: New Zealand
- Coordinates: 39.935408°S 175.57354°E
- Elevation: 268 m (879 ft)
- Line: North Island Main Trunk
- Distance: Wellington 205.33 km (127.59 mi)

History
- Opened: 19 October 1887
- Closed: 13 October 1986
- Electrified: June 1988

Services
Preceding station	Historical railways	Following station
Kaikarangi; Line open, station closed 4.29 km (2.67 mi)	North Island Main Trunk; KiwiRail	Silverhope; Line open, station closed 5.05 km (3.14 mi)
Location

Hunterville railway station was a station on the North Island Main Trunk in New Zealand, serving the township of Hunterville.

Goods were first carried to the station on 19 October 1887, though the official opening of the 15 mi 57 ch (25.3 km) Marton to Hunterville section was not until Saturday 2 June 1888, when the station was served by two trains a week, reported as losing £15 a week. A Certificate of Inspection for the line was issued on Wednesday, 6 June 1888. Hunterville closed on 13 October 1986, though the passing loop was retained. A platform also remains.

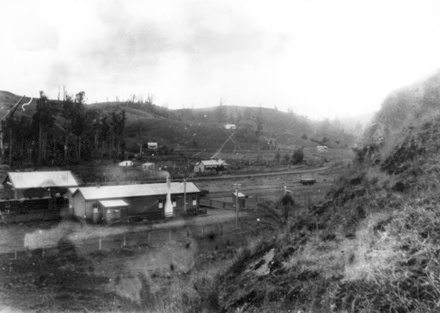
Hunterville in 1900s

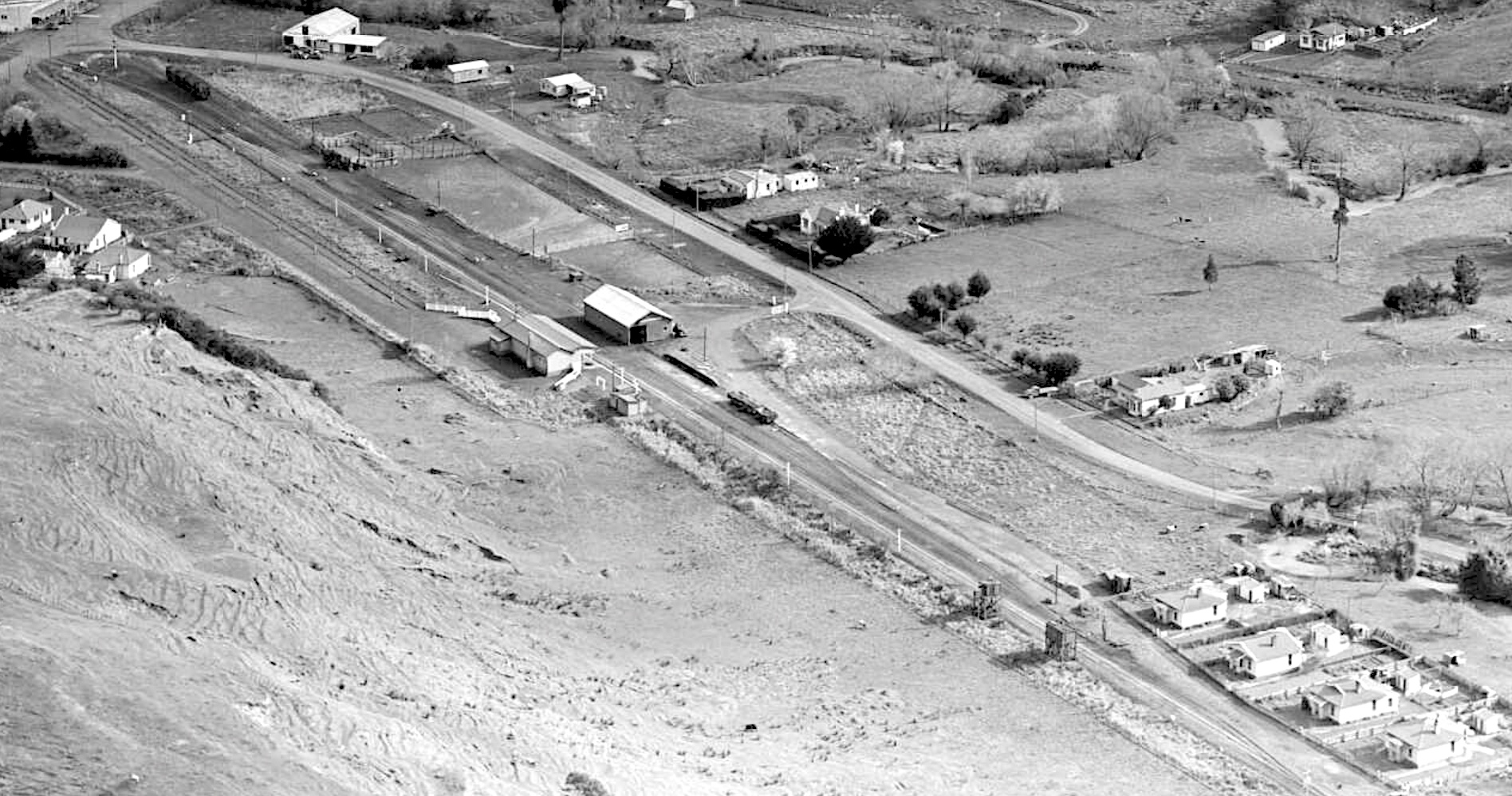
Hunterville in 1949

== History ==
Opening of the Hunterville Branch (later incorporated in NIMT) was delayed, due to problems with the earlier Porewa Contract and to tenders exceeding government's costings for the work. Due to such problems, works further up the line were mostly let to worker cooperatives. Work was also delayed after William Russell got Parliamentary support to cut spending on public works in September 1885.

The station site was identified in 1885 and a contract to build the station signed on 10 July 1885. Gifford & O'Connor completed the buildings by 24 December 1887, though a 1963 report said it was built in 1904. From 1891 to 1903 there was a Post Office at the station.

In 1896 the station was noted as having a passenger platform, 34 wagon passing loop, privies, urinals, goods shed 30 ft (9.1 m) by 40 ft (12 m), cart approach to platform, loading bank, cattle yards, water service, coaling, engine shed and stationmaster's house. Improvements in 1899 added a verandah, raised the building and extended the platform south, which had only room for two cars and a van. It was further extended in 1912. In 1906 part of the Mangaonoho goods shed was moved to Hunterville, extending the shed to 30 ft (9.1 m) by 60 ft (18 m). From 1910 the station was lit by acetylene gas. Express trains called at Hunterville from 3 April 1911. A crane was added in 1915. Hunterville had its annual returns of traffic recorded, as did Utiku to the north and Marton to the south. For example, it had 16,300 passengers in 1923, and had the largest outward numbers of sheep and pigs on NIMT, at 93,976.

In 1960 the crossing loop was extended to 120 wagons and colour-light signalling installed.

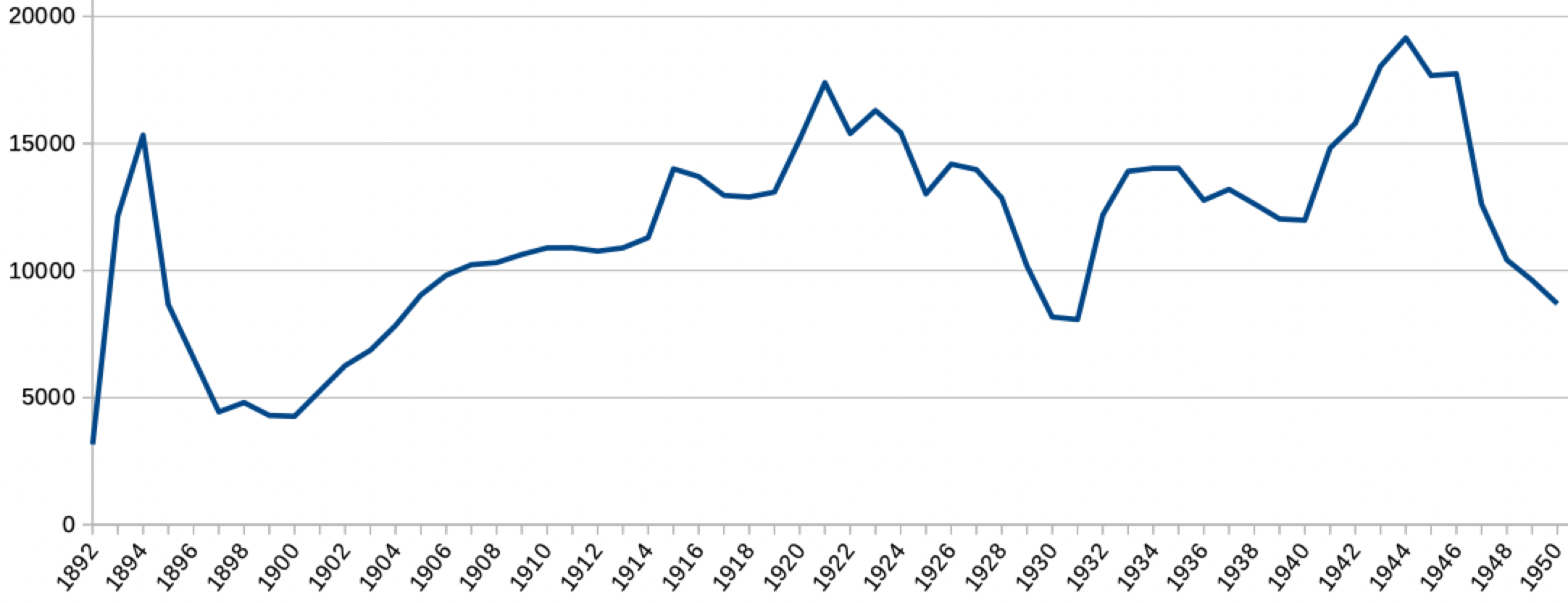
tickets sales 1892–1950 – derived from annual returns to Parliament of "Statement of Revenue for each Station for the Year ended"

== Incidents ==
A landslide derailed a DA Class locomotive about 2 mi (3.2 km) south of Hunterville in July 1965, and wagons derailed on 20 January 2005 at Hunterville and on 6 May 2009, just to the north, due to track and wagon defects.
