= Mangaweka deviation =

Railway line in New Zealand

Coordinates: 39.7953°S 175.8034°E

Map

The Mangaweka Deviation is a 7 km single track deviation of the North Island Main Trunk (NIMT) railway line in the central North Island of New Zealand, between the settlements of Mangaweka and Utiku, south of Taihape. Opened on 18 November 1981, by the Prime Minister, Robert Muldoon, it was constructed between 1973 and 1981 at a cost of $17m; to move the line away from geologically unstable land; and also to replace the high-maintenance steel viaducts including the Mangaweka Viaduct. It is the most recent and most significant deviation of the NIMT since it was opened in 1909.

== History ==
The original section of the line was constructed as part of the NIMT in 1904. The entirety of the route from Marton north to Taihape was built to the west of the Rangitikei River and lies predominantly on the terraces within the river valley. Only south of Marton does the NIMT cross the Rangitikei en route to Palmerston North and Wellington.

Between the settlements of Mangaweka and Utiku the western river terrace is largely non-existent with steep hill country running into tall river cliffs. The topography is also compounded by the confluence of the Kawhatau River with the Rangitikei. However, despite these obstacles surveyors were able to identify a route that kept the line to the west of the river along the cliff tops; albeit one that included a climb at each end of the section, a viaduct, and several tunnels.

By the 1940s concerns existed about the long-term stability of the land the section ran through. While the general Mangaweka area was susceptible to slips due to its steep hilly nature, rainfall and underlying geology of papa rock (mudstone), the railway, by virtue of its cliff top nature and several tunnels, was thought to be under particular threat from erosion and collapse.

At the same time concerns were also being voiced over State Highway 1 as the steep, narrow and twisting alignment was also prone to slips – having been built after the railway in the same area though further to the west – and naturally imposed speed restrictions that were exacerbated by heavier vehicles and creating bottlenecks.

As a result, investigations were commenced into improving both routes, including the feasibility of a joint rail-road alignment.

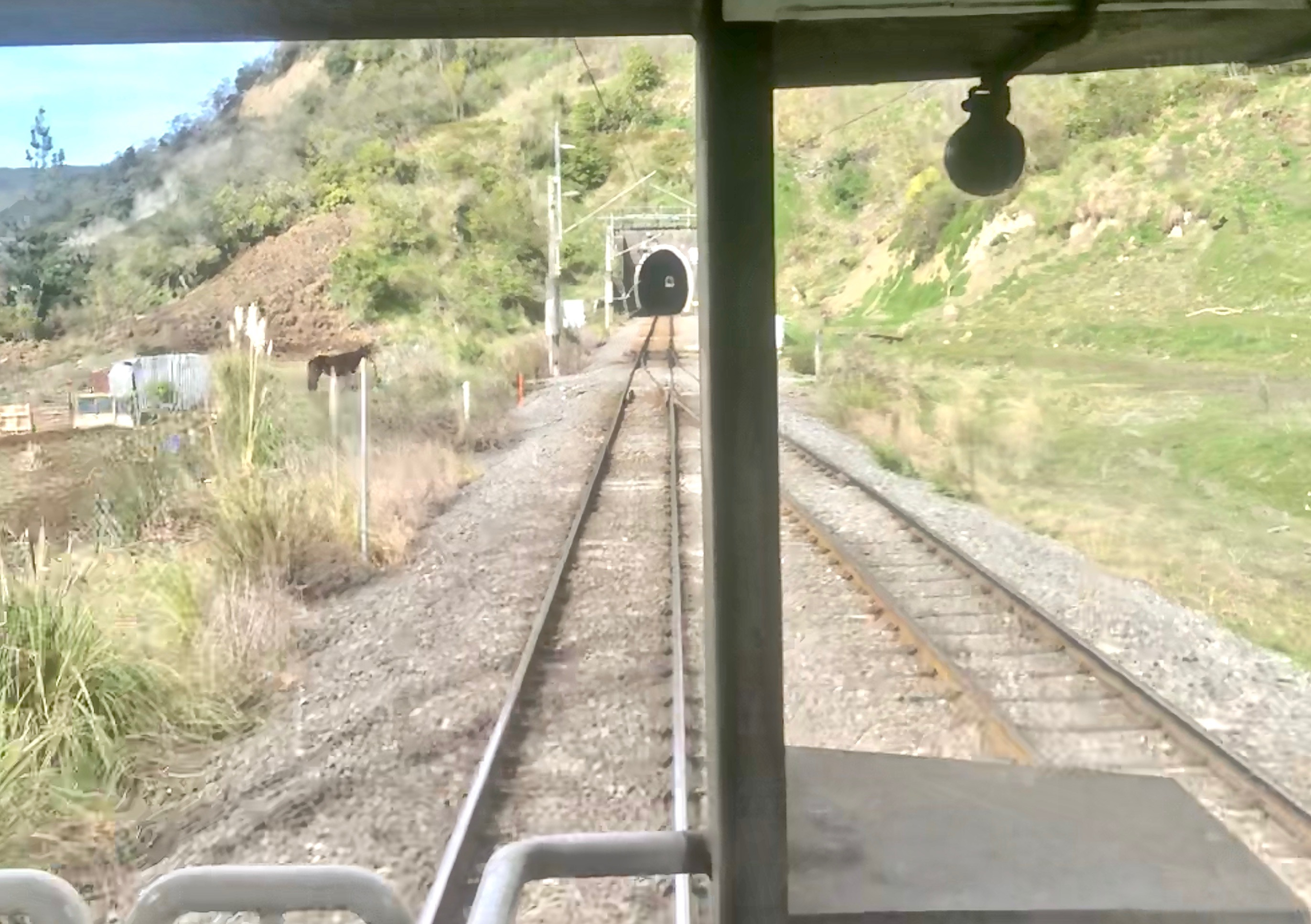
The 549m Mangaweka, or Pouwhakaroa Tunnel is at the southern end of the Mangaweka Deviation. The old line used to curve away at the foot of the hill to the right

== Construction and new alignment ==
From a number of options put forward different routes were chosen for SH1 and the NIMT, as it proved possible to reconstruct SH1 over much of the existing alignment. The SH1 works were completed in stages between 1972 and 1980.

The NIMT route chosen was from one of the joint options given and was constructed between 1973 and 1981. The new alignment crossed the Rangitikei River twice and the Kawhatau River once - requiring the construction of three massive viaducts - and also removed the gradients at each end of the section.

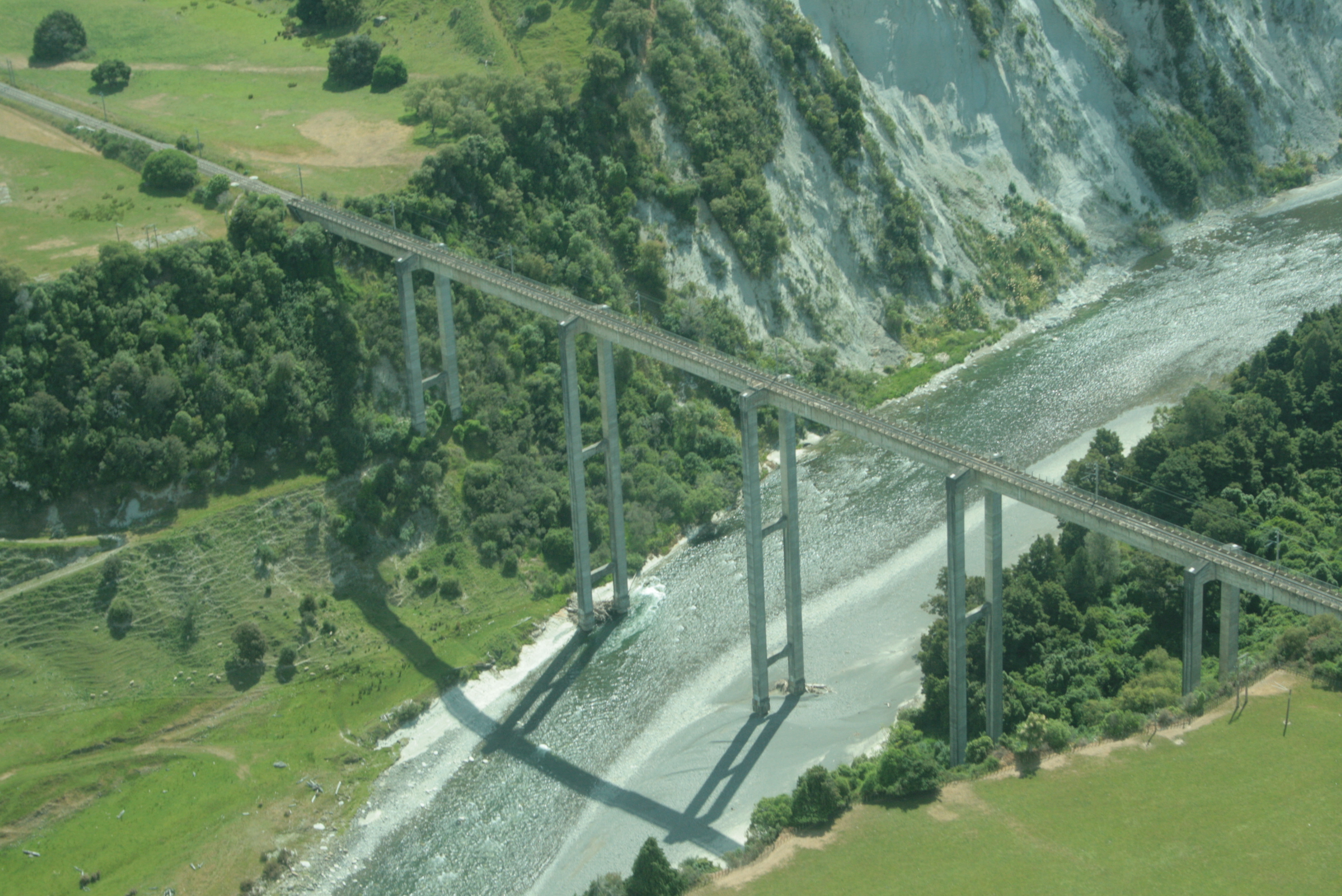
South Rangitikei Viaduct

From the south, the deviation leaves the old alignment at exit of the Mangaweka tunnel, and crosses SH1 and passes much closer to the settlement than it did previously. It then passes under SH1 before crossing the South Rangitikei viaduct, which is 315 m (1,033 ft) long, with six spans of up to 56 m (184 ft), and the twin leg piers which rise up to 76 m (249 ft) above the Rangitikei River and are designed to rock in an earthquake to avoid damage. On 5 May 1975 200 tonnes of steel and concrete collapsed to the valley floor during construction of the South Rangitikei viaduct, bringing about a revision of the Ministry of Works and Development's Code of Practice for Falsework and Formwork. The line then runs along the eastern river terrace for about 2 km, firstly through a lengthy cutting and then across the Blind Gully embankment (New Zealand's largest) before crossing the Kawhatau (73-m high over the Kawhatau River) and North Rangitikei (81-m high) viaducts in quick succession; the North Rangitikei viaduct is the highest on the NIMT. Both the Kawhatau and North Rangitikei viaducts have a 160-m long single centre span and two 25-m long approach spans, and are to a cantilever design so differ from the South Rangitikei Viaduct design. The line rejoins the original NIMT alignment a further 1 km north, just to the south of Utiku.

The section was subsequently electrified as part of the NIMT electrification carried out between 1984 and 1988.

The deviation was opened in 1981, after which the rails were lifted on the former alignment.

The Mangaweka Viaduct had been built between November 1902 and November 1903, and was demolished in 1982. It was 946 feet (288 m) long and 158 feet (48 m) high; with eight major 80 feet (24 m) spans and several of 34 feet (10 m).

== The former alignment today ==
Much of the former alignment still exists today. For most travellers the most visible remnant of the old line are the bases of the Mangaweka viaduct which sit on the hillsides on each side of SH1 just north of the railway overpass. The formation can still be followed either side of where the viaduct stood, though to the south it is slowly being reclaimed by bush and the tunnel at the top of the climb has been almost totally blocked by a slip at the northern portal. The southern portal can still be viewed from Te Kapua Road, across the road from the start of the Mangaweka Scenic Reserve track, however it is on private farmland. North of the former viaduct the formation also runs through farmland. The five tunnels on this side of the alignment remain largely intact, however one tunnel, 10F is filled with water as a reservoir, on Manui farm.

The former Mangaweka railway station closed in 1981, and the former Utiku railway station closed in 1986.
