= Mangaweka railway station =

Defunct railway station in New Zealand

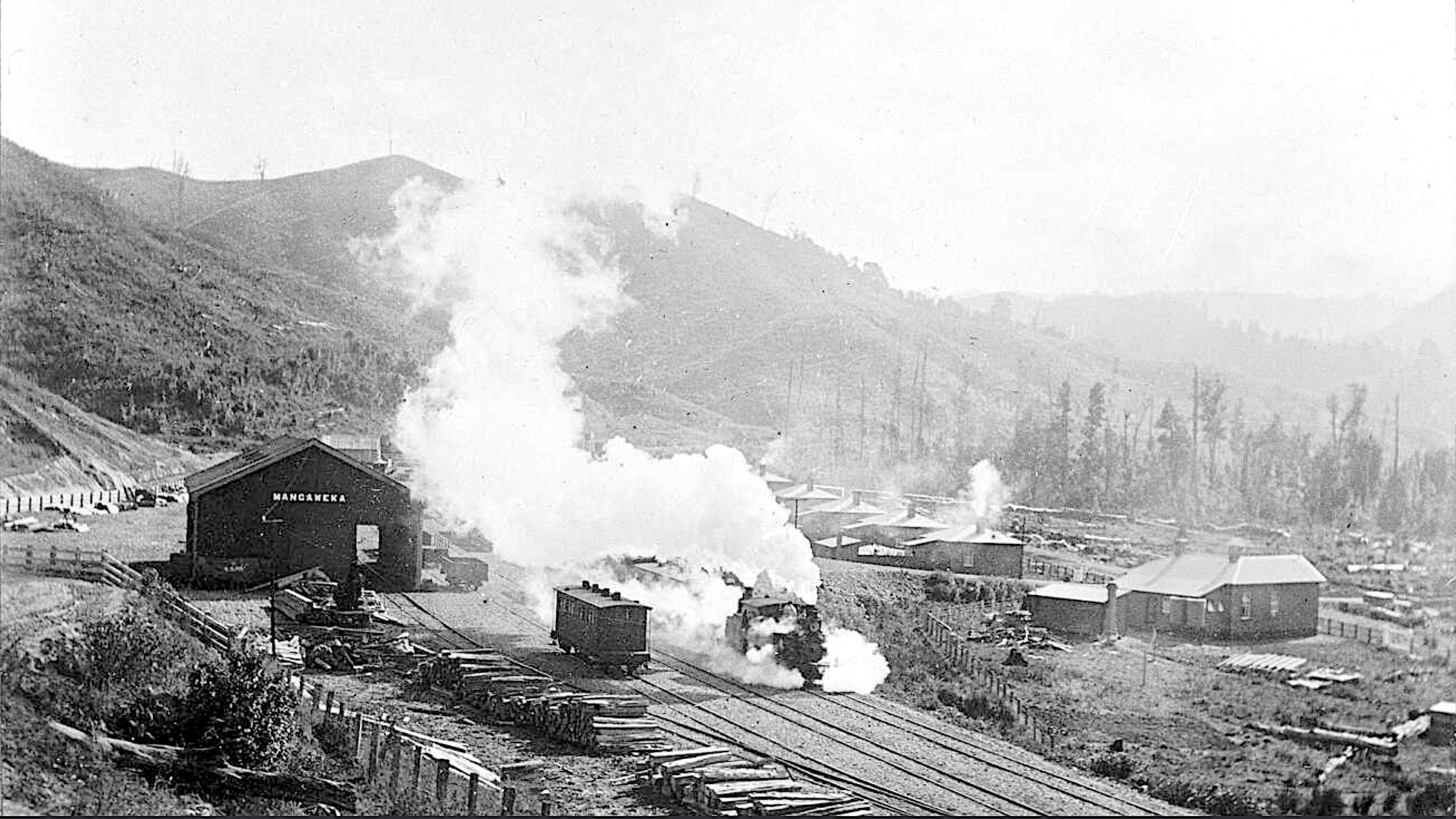
- Mangaweka railway station about 1902

General information
- Location: New Zealand
- Coordinates: 39.821179°S 175.77522°E
- Elevation: 327 m (1,073 ft)
- Line: North Island Main Trunk
- Distance: Wellington 231.04 km (143.56 mi)

History
- Opened: 3 November 1902
- Closed: Passengers 18 April 1971; Goods before 1993
- Electrified: June 1988

Services
Preceding station	Historical railways	Following station
Utiku; Line open, station closed 12.65 km (7.86 mi)	North Island Main Trunk; KiwiRail	Ōhingaiti; Line open, station closed 8.9 km (5.5 mi)
Location

Mangaweka railway station was a station on the North Island Main Trunk (NIMT), serving the village of Mangaweka in the Manawatū-Whanganui region of New Zealand. The original station opened in 1902 and closed on 15 November 1981. A new station then opened to the east, on the Mangaweka deviation on 18 November 1981, though only for parcels, small lots, and as a passing loop, which still remains.

The station was important as the terminus of the line from Wellington from 1902 to 1904.

== History ==
An advert for timber for the station building was placed on 13 December 1901. Dates from 3 July to 30 August 1902 are mentioned for opening goods traffic to Mangaweka and 30 October for inspection of the 9 mi 20 ch (14.9 km) line from Mangaonoho to Mangaweka. New Zealand Railways (NZR) took the line over from the Public Works Department on Monday, 3 November 1902, when the stationmaster was transferred from Ōhingaiti to Mangaweka and the station was noted as having a passenger platform, 84 wagon passing loop, privies, urinals, goods shed 72 ft (22 m) by 42 ft (13 m), loading bank, sheep and cattle yards, water service (one 2,000 gallon vat), coal shed 24 ft (7.3 m) by 16 ft (4.9 m), engine shed 72 ft 6 in (22.10 m) by 21 ft 6 in (6.55 m), with a 59 ft (18 m) long pit, and stationmaster's house. On 1 November 1904 a cart approach and crane were also mentioned and a warehouse crane and stockyard upgrade came in 1913.

Dates for the extension northwards are also varied. 9 June to 4 August 1904 are given for when the 7 mi 75 ch (12.8 km) extension from Mangaweka to Utiku opened for goods. Passenger trains started running to Taihape on Friday, 12 August 1904, though it wasn't until Tuesday, 1 November 1904 when NZR took over the 12 mi 76 ch (20.8 km) Mangaweka to Taihape section.

In 1957 the passing loop was extended and motor points and colour light signals installed.

When passenger trains stopped calling from Sunday, 18 April 1971, much of the station building had been demolished, though in 1980 a station building, goods shed, loading bank, and 1½ ton crane remained. A new station opened on Wednesday, 18 November 1981, but closed before 1993.

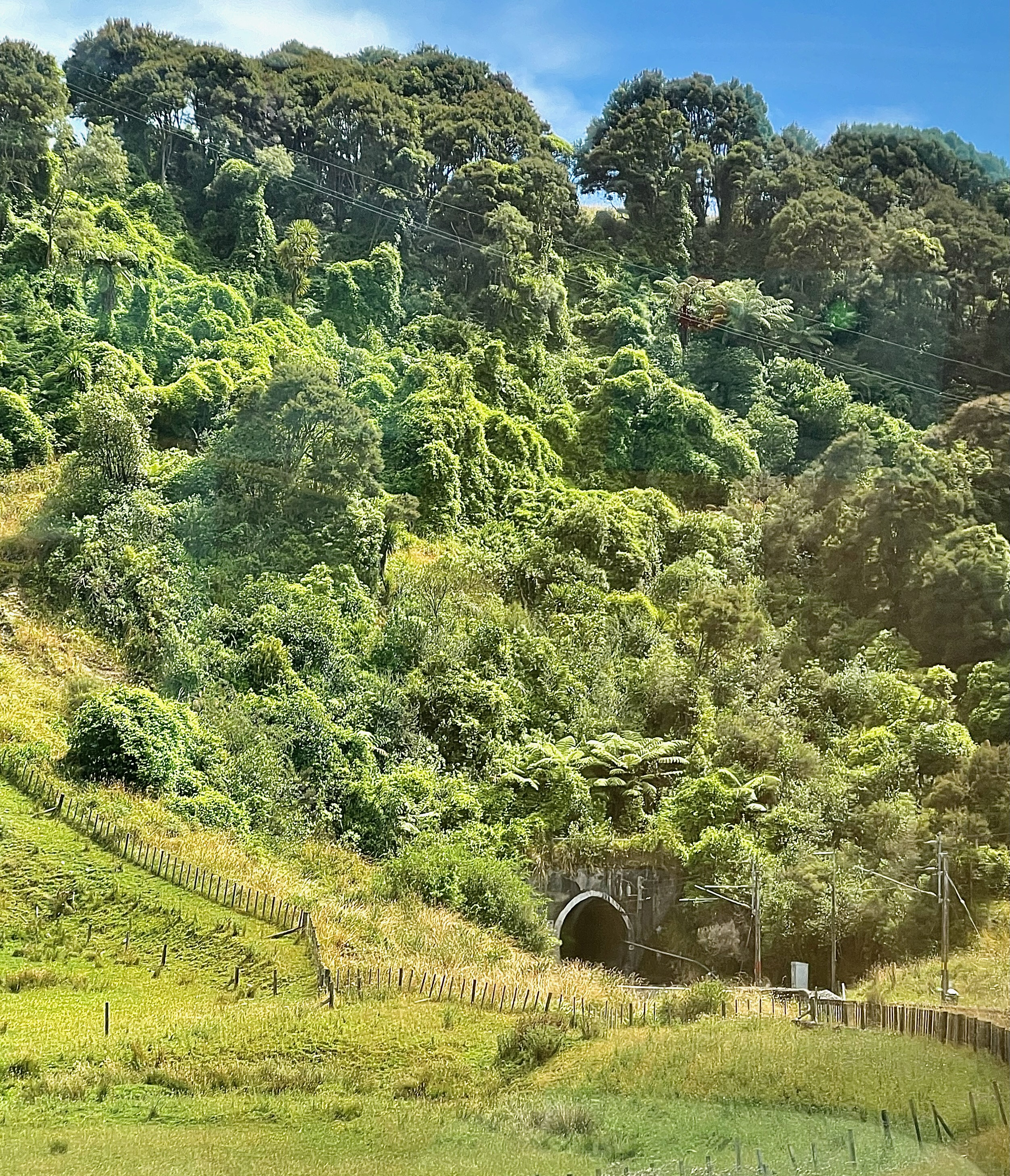
Mangaweka tunnel south portal

== Tunnel ==
Tunnel 10 on the NIMT is Mangaweka. The 600 yd (550 m) tunnel was completed in January 1898, when it was known as Powhakaroa Tunnel. Its northern portal is just south of Mangaweka and its southern end is near Pouwhakaura. It is lined with concrete blocks, which were made in a nearby temporary shed.

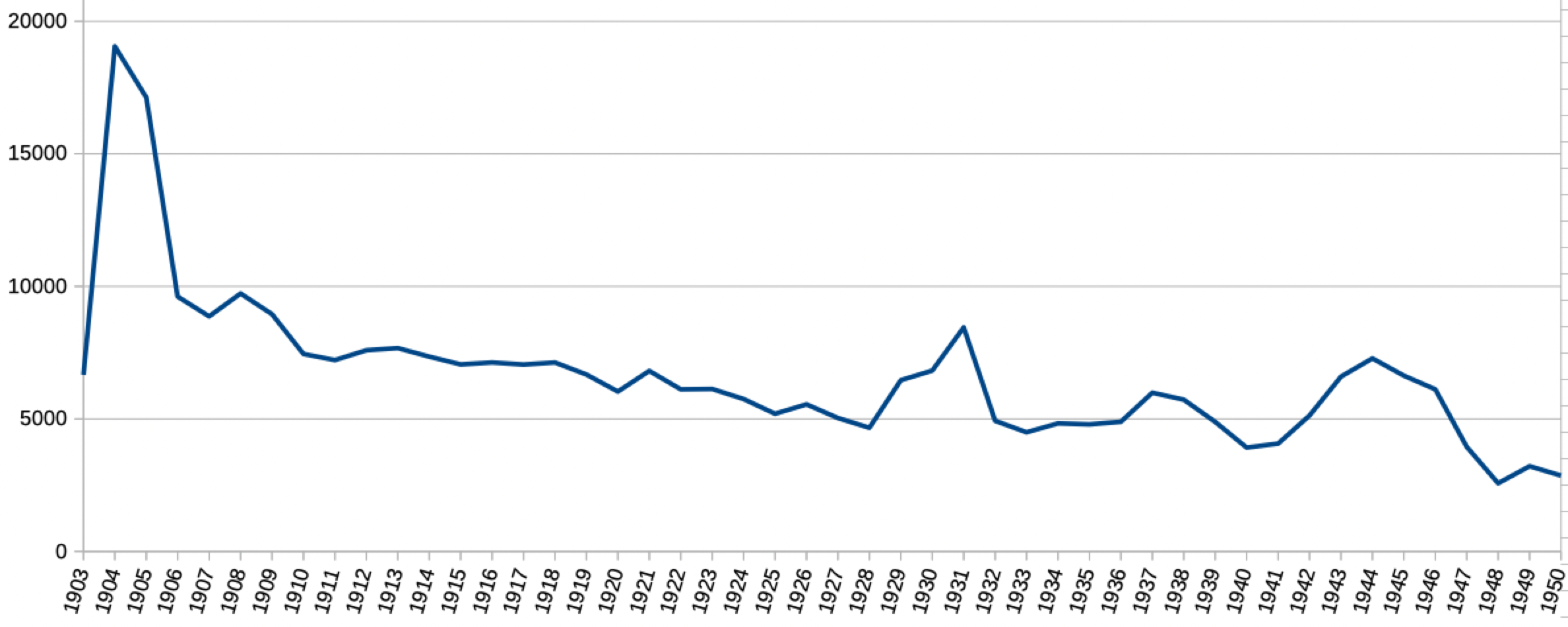
tickets sales 1903–1950 – derived from annual returns to Parliament of "Statement of Revenue for each Station for the Year ended"

== Station operation ==
Mangaweka was one of the stopping points for NIMT expresses in 1910 and still in 1932. In 1931 the station was staffed by a grade 6 stationmaster and clerk and a grade 7 relief clerk. It still had 3 staff in 1941.

Mangaweka had its annual returns of traffic recorded, as did Utiku to the north and Ōhingaiti to the south. Passenger numbers grew whilst the station was the terminus of the line and during the World War 2, before tailing off towards 1950, as shown in the graph and table below.

year	tickets	season tickets	staff	ref.
1903	6662	1	1	
1904	19,054		9	
1905	17125	2	4	
1906	9614	46	4	
1907	8868	47	4	
1908	9730	24	4	
1909	8949	9	4	
1910	7449		4	
1911	7218	2	4	
1912	7589		4	
1913	7669	11	5	
1914	7347	8		
1915	7054	9		
1916	7128	21		
1917	7049	44		
1918	7128	42		
1919	6673	15		
1920	6030	14		
1921	6809	17		
1922	6115	12		
1923	6128	20		
1924	5748	11		
1925	5192	29		
1926	5549	13		
1927	5031	4		
1928	4664	10		
1929	6460	8		
1930	6821	7		
1931	8450	15	3	
1932	4926	15		
1933	4494	12		
1934	4828	7		
1935	4792	9		
1936	4890	7		
1937	5987	6		
1938	5724	51		
1939	4887	50		
1940	3919	27		
1941	4067	30		
1942	5126	38		
1943	6593	37		
1944	7282	18		
1945	6630	15		
1946	6114	19		
1947	3944	8		
1948	2570	16		
1949	3214	15		
1950	2859	12		

== Incidents ==
A slip derailed a locomotive at the entrance to the tunnel in 1913. A goods train derailed, breaking several trucks and some track, in a cutting on the Mangaweka side of Mangaweka Viaduct in 1930.
