= Taoroa Junction =

- Rural community
- Interactive map of Taoroa Junction
- Coordinates: 39.696°S 175.944°E
- Country: New Zealand
- Region: Manawatū-Whanganui
- Territorial authority: Rangitikei District
- Wards: Northern General Ward; Tiikeitia ki Uta (Inland) Māori Ward
- Community: Taihape Community
- Electorates: Rangitīkei; Te Tai Hauāuru (Māori)

Government
  - Territorial Authority: Rangitikei District Council
  - Regional council: Horizons Regional Council
  - Mayor of Rangitikei: Andy Watson
  - Rangitīkei MP: Suze Redmayne
  - Te Tai Hauāuru MP: Debbie Ngarewa-Packer

Taoroa Junction or Taoroa is a rural community in the Rangitikei District and Manawatū-Whanganui region of New Zealand's North Island.

In July 2017, homes in the area were snowed in and many homes were left without power by a major snowstorm.

== Demographics ==
Taoroa Junction is covered by the demographics at Pukeokahu.

== Education ==
Taoroa School is a co-educational state primary school for Year 1 to 8 students, with a roll of 44 as of July 2026. The school opened in 1904 as Lower Moawhango School and was renamed Taoroa School in 1907.
