= Taihape railway station =

Defunct railway station in New Zealand

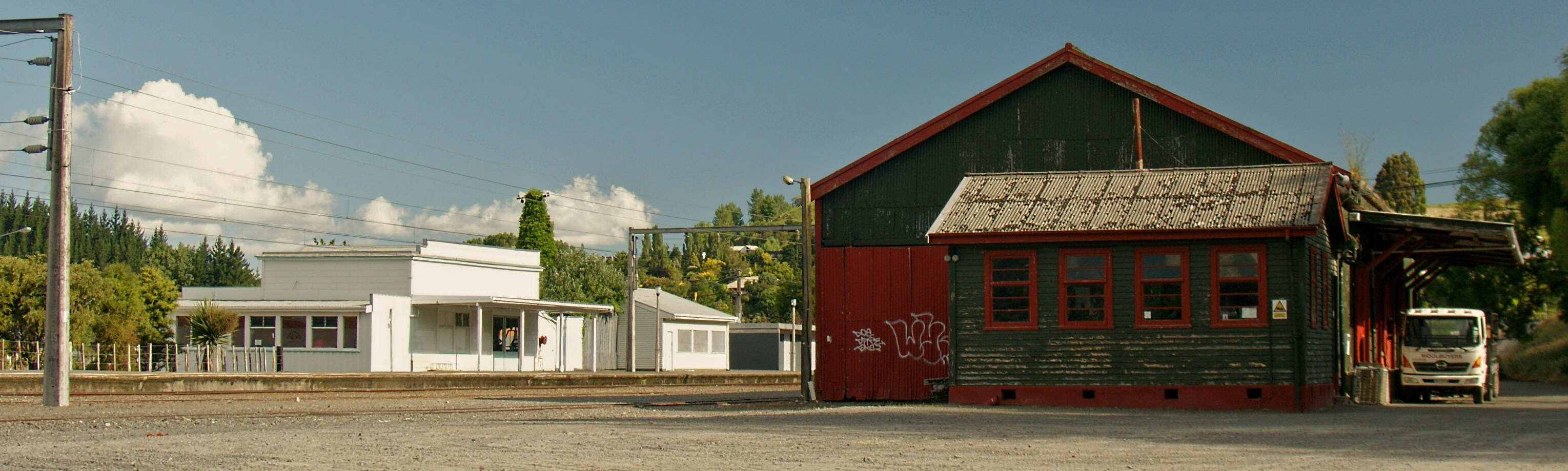
- Taihape station and goods shed in 2011

General information
- Location: New Zealand
- Coordinates: 39.6789°S 175.7971°E
- Elevation: 442 m (1,450 ft)
- Line: North Island Main Trunk
- Distance: Wellington 251.85 km (156.49 mi)

History
- Opened: 4 August 1904
- Closed: 10 April 2005
- Electrified: June 1988

Services
Preceding station	Historical railways	Following station
Mataroa; Line open, station closed	North Island Main Trunk; KiwiRail	Winiata; Line open, station closed
Location

Taihape railway station in Taihape, New Zealand was an important intermediate station on the North Island Main Trunk line, with a refreshment room, marshalling yard and locomotive depot. The station was opened for goods from 4 August 1904 and for passengers from 1 November 1904. The NIMT was opened to through Auckland to Wellington trains from 9 November 1908, with the first NIMT express trains from 14 February 1909. The formal opening was on Saturday 20 November 1908 by the Prime Minister, Richard Seddon.

After closing from 10 April 2005, the station was reopened for passengers for a twelve months trial period from 23 October 2009.

The marshalling yard and locomotive depot operated until the late 1970s. A banker locomotive was added to trains proceeding over the long incline across the central plateau. A turntable was available to turn around locomotives, but it was dismantled and removed in the early 1980s. The goods shed and locomotive depot were at the south end of the rail yard. The New Zealand Railways Road Services bus depot was alongside the railway station.

In 1999 Tranz Rail demolished the historic Taihape railway station. The Refreshment Rooms remained on the former station platform, as did the goods shed and locomotive depot compound at the south end of the Yard.

After a long period of fund-raising by Rotary, the loco turntable was re-purchased and installed, so that special trains can run to Taihape and turn around for the return run. A local engineering company installed an old steam whistle operated by compressed air; which has become the town smoko signal, sounding at 10am, noon, and 3pm. Tourists often mistake the sound for a steam engine at the station.

The bridge over the Hautapu River, just to the south of the station, was built on concrete piers with spans of 33 ft (10 m), 122 ft (37 m) and 44 ft (13 m).

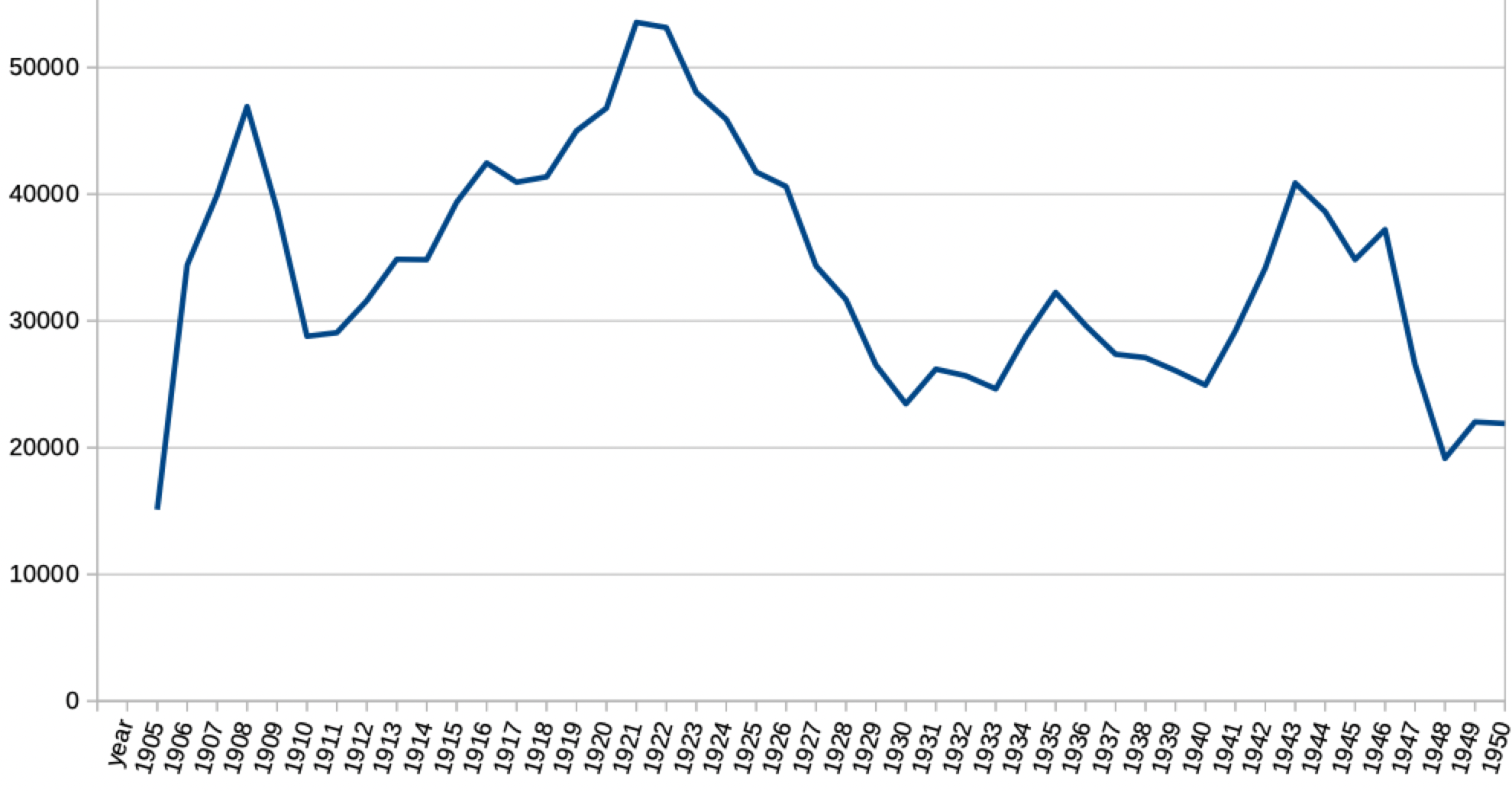
tickets sales 1905–1950 – derived from annual returns to Parliament of "Statement of Revenue for each Station for the Year ended"
