= Ōwhango railway station =

Railway station in New Zealand

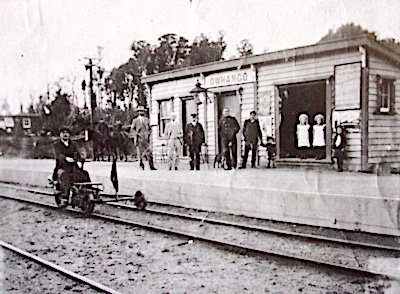
- Ōwhango railway station about 1910

General information
- Location: New Zealand
- Coordinates: 39.006577°S 175.376367°E
- Elevation: 457 m (1,499 ft)
- Line: North Island Main Trunk
- Distance: Wellington 371.89 km (231.08 mi)

History
- Opened: 1905
- Closed: 2 June 1985
- Electrified: June 1988

Services
Preceding station	Historical railways	Following station
Kakahi; Line open, station closed	North Island Main Trunk; KiwiRail	Oio; Line open, station closed
Location

Ōwhango was a station on the North Island Main Trunk line, in the Ruapehu District of New Zealand. It served the village of Ōwhango, which lay to the north of the station. It was 5.64 km (3.50 mi) north of Oio and 9.11 km (5.66 mi) south of Kakahi. The Public Works Department transferred the station to NZ Railways on 9 November 1908, though bush had been felled along the railway route in 1904, by March 1905 a station yard was being formed and by August 1905 it was the railhead, with track laid 4 mi (6.4 km) beyond to the south.

By 20 March 1908 there was a 225 ft (69 m) x 20 ft (6.1 m) passenger platform, a 22 ft (6.7 m) x 9 ft (2.7 m) shelter shed, with lobby and store, a tablet office, a loading bank, cattle yards and pens, a 30 ft (9.1 m) x 20 ft (6.1 m) goods shed with verandah, privies, urinals and 4 water tanks of 2,000 imp gal (9.1 m^{3}) each, with water supplied by a hydraulic ram. A 6th class station, cart approach to the platform and fixed signals were added by 10 November 1908 and a sheep yard in 1909. In 1912 the platform was enlarged. In 1964 the timber platform front was renewed, but on 30 January 1965 the station building burnt down. By 21 July 1980 a building, with a brick veneer and a concrete floor, had replaced it.

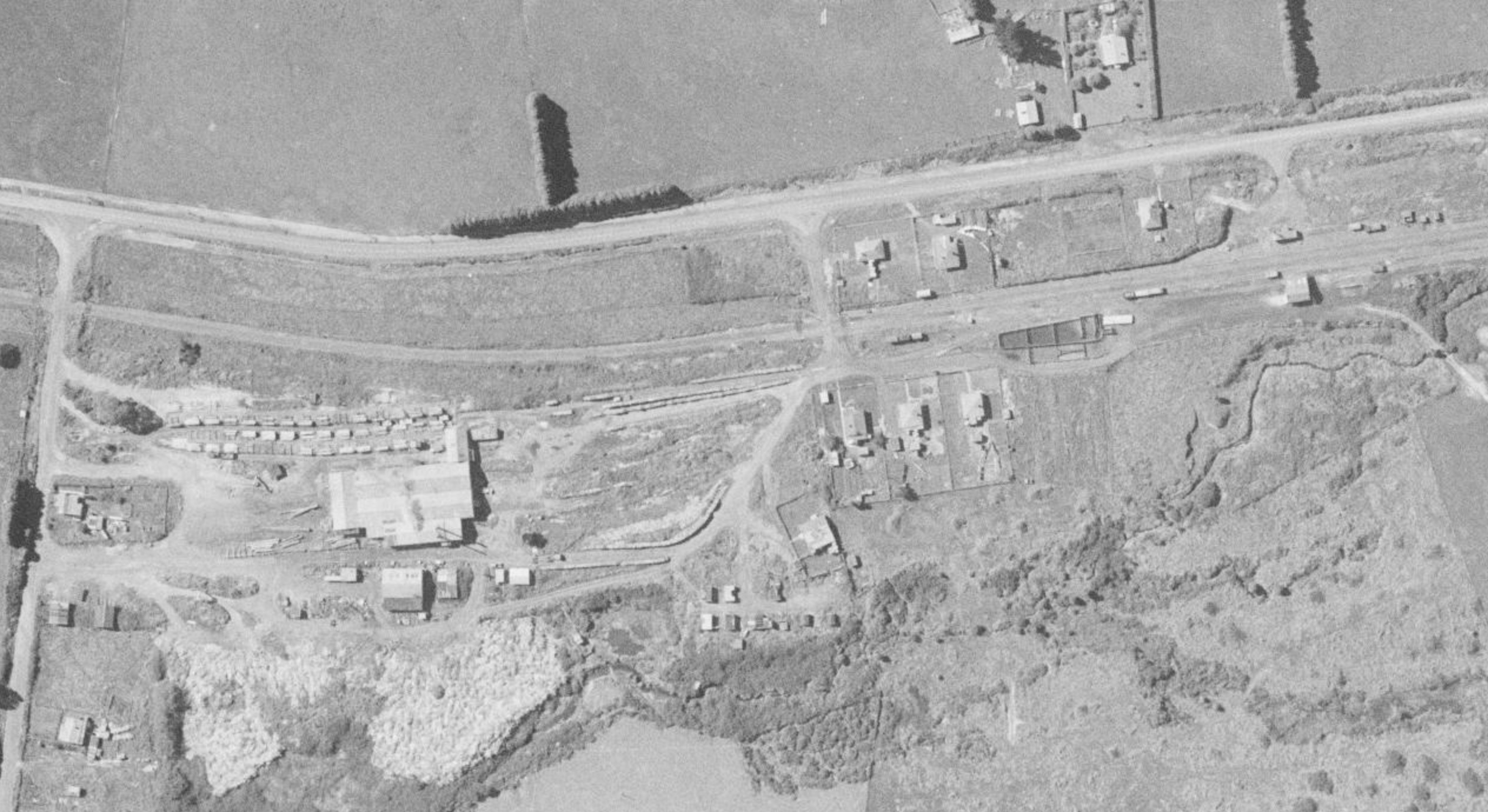
Ōwhango in 1958, before the 1908 building was burnt in the 1965 fire

By 20 March 1908 there was a passing loop for 48 wagons. In 1980 it was extended to an 82 wagon capacity. In 1910 a large timber mill and siding were built. Traffic in 1911 averaged 6 wagon loads a day. from 5 nearby sawmills, which cut matai, rimu and kahikatea.

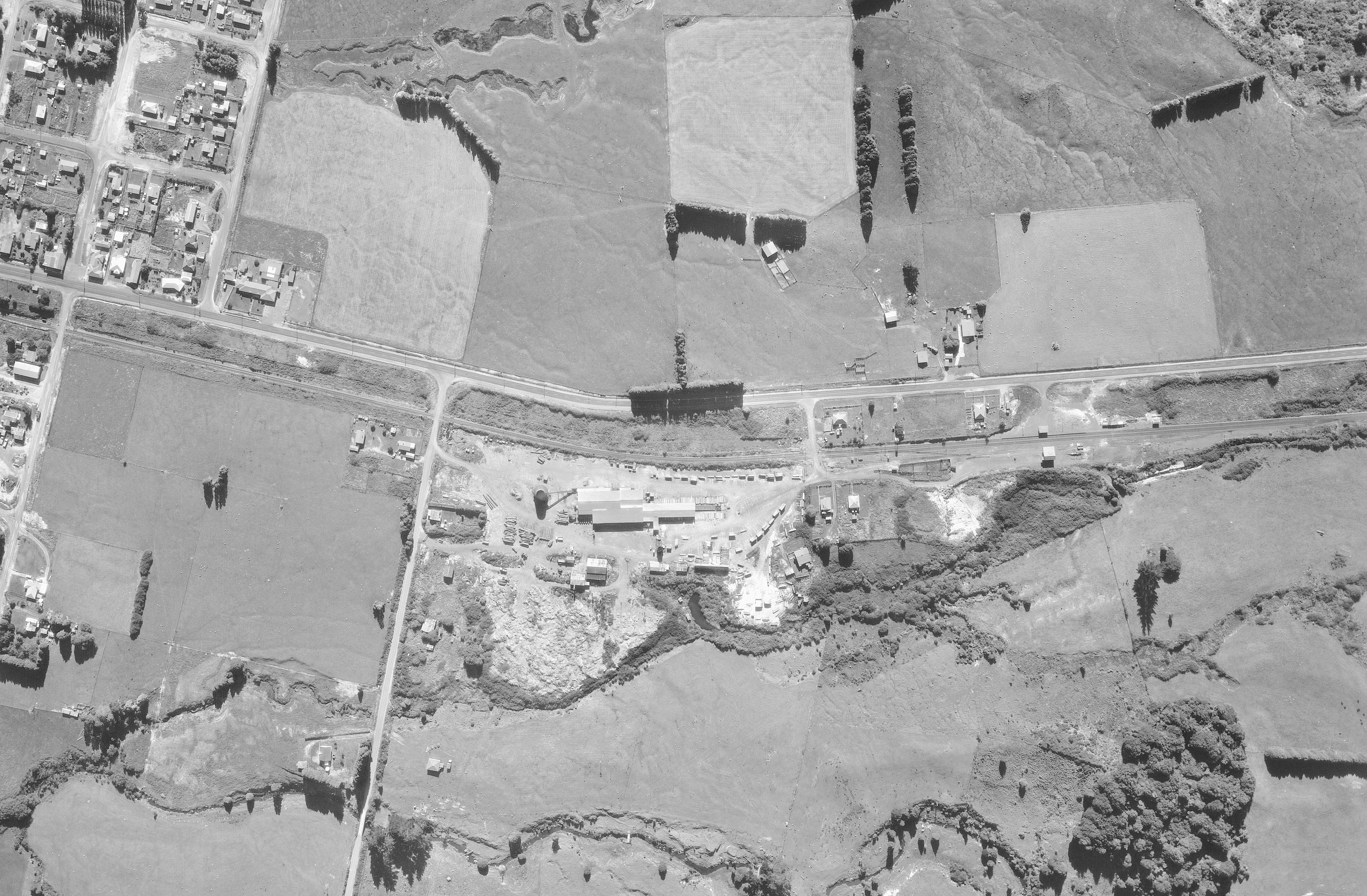
Ōwhango railway station in 1975

Passenger traffic had ceased by 1976. On 2 June 1985 Ōwhango closed to goods too, though the crossing loop remains in use.
