= Oio railway station =

Railway station in New Zealand

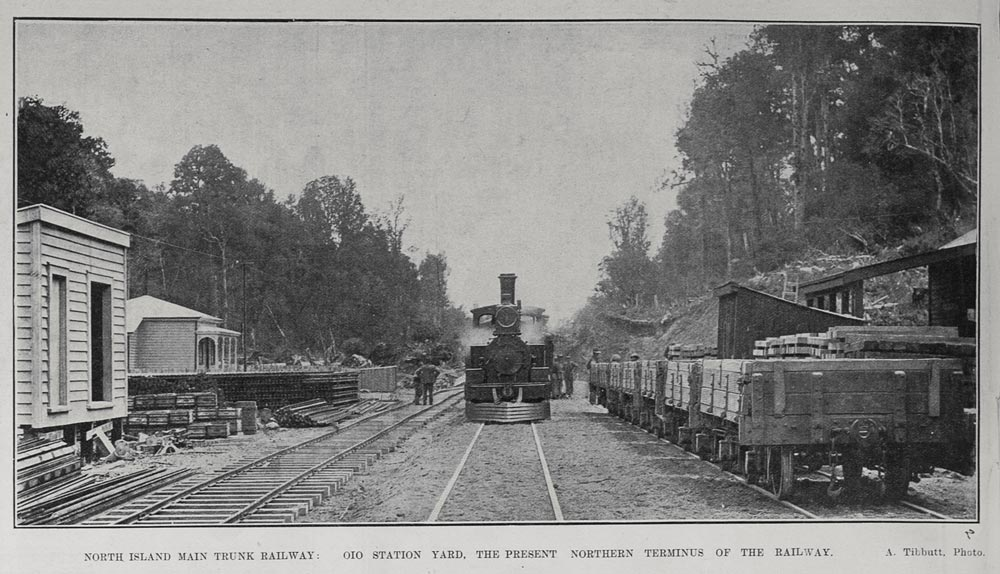
- Oio station yard in 1906

General information
- Location: New Zealand
- Coordinates: 39.053594°S 175.379797°E
- Elevation: 465 m (1,526 ft)
- Line: North Island Main Trunk
- Distance: Wellington 367.19 km (228.16 mi)

History
- Opened: 1905
- Closed: 28 August 1972
- Electrified: June 1988

Services
Preceding station	Historical railways	Following station
Ōwhango; Line open, station closed	North Island Main Trunk; KiwiRail	Raurimu; Line open, station closed
Location

Oio was a station on the North Island Main Trunk line, in the Ruapehu District of New Zealand. It served the hamlet of Oio, which lay to the north of the station. It was 8.29 km (5.15 mi) north of Raurimu and 5.64 km (3.50 mi) south of Ōwhango. It was one of the many temporary railheads along the route, with work going on from 1904 to 1908.

The Public Works Department transferred the station to NZ Railways on 9 November 1908, though a road had been built in 1904, by March 1905 a station yard was being formed and by April 1906 it was the railhead, with a pumice road to Makatote. By then trains were bringing ballast, platelaying was in progress and the track stretched halfway to Raurimu, having been realigned due to a slip and crossing an embankment into a 70 ft (21 m) cutting, which was being cut. An unnamed stream, then called the Waikohatu River, was to be bridged and pile-driving was in progress for a 276 ft (84 m) bridge over Piopiotea Stream, the bridge girders being made in Auckland by Fraser and Co. The bridge has since been replaced in concrete. By 10 May 1907 goods could reach Raurimu by rail.

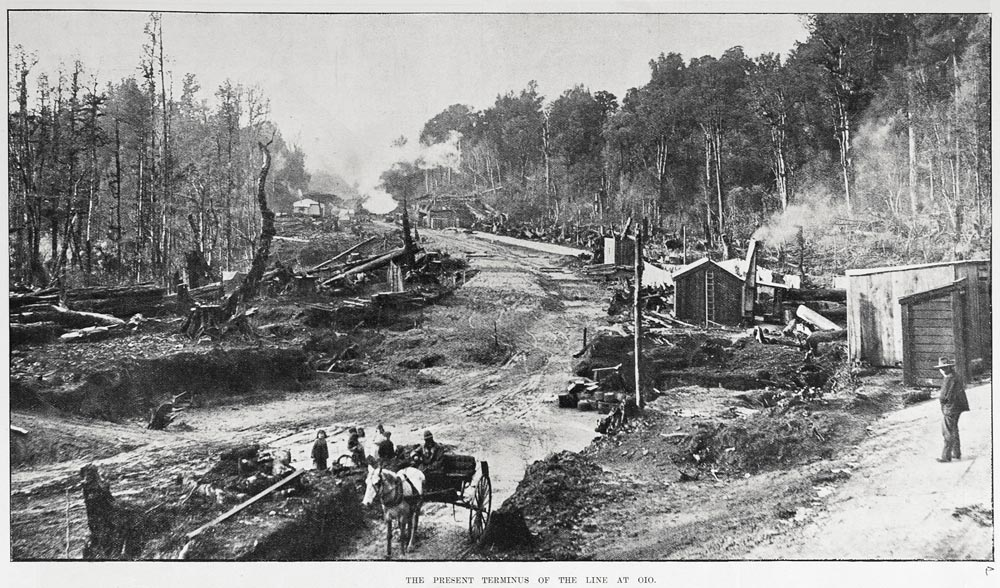
Oio in 1905, when it was the terminus of the line from Auckland

By 20 March 1908 Oio had a passing loop for 58 wagons, a 200 ft (61 m) x 20 ft (6.1 m) passenger platform, a 22 ft (6.7 m) x 9 ft (2.7 m) shelter shed, with lobby and store, a tablet office, a loading bank, cattle yards and pens, a 30 ft (9.1 m) x 20 ft (6.1 m) goods shed with verandah, privies, urinals and a water tank of 2,000 imp gal (9.1 m^{3}) supplying water by gravity. A 6th class station and cart approach to the platform were added by 10 November 1908.

Houses for railway workers were built between 1908 and 1926, the population of Oio being 102 by 1916.

Oio was one of 3 stations with the shortest (three-letter) names in New Zealand, along with Ava in Wellington and Tui in the Nelson Region. The name may be a contraction of ioio (muscular), or puioio (a tree knot).

Oio closed to passengers on 5 July 1970 and to freight on 28 August 1972.

== Manson's Siding ==
Manson & Clark put in a siding, 2 mi 28 ch (3.8 km) south of Oio, between 1915 and 1917 to serve their timber mill, which had a tramway running to the north west. The mill, described as United Sawmills in 1932, burnt down in 1937 and the siding closed on 3 April 1949. The name remains as a road and a locality.

=== Incidents ===
A train was stuck in a washout a mile south of Oio in 1933. Trains were delayed by a washout at Mansons Siding in 1940. A goods train was partly derailed in a cutting near Mansons Siding in heavy rain in 1941. A 1945 washout injured 2 passengers and derailed 6 coaches of the Night Limited, just north of Mansons Siding.

RM 30 collided with a velocipede between Raurimu and Oio on 28 January 1982.

On 7 August 1991, after striking a washout near Mansons Siding, driver Graeme Peter Orange died and EF class locomotives 30036 and 30088 were later scrapped. A memorial was placed there and in 2017 a train stopped at the washout site in tribute.
