= North Island Main Trunk =

Railway line in New Zealand running between Auckland and Wellington

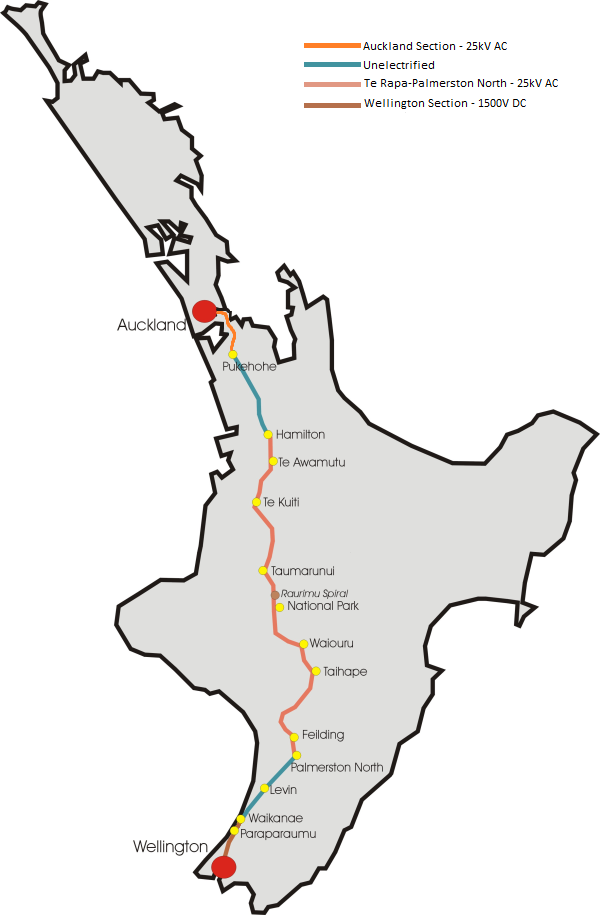
- Map of the North Island Main Trunk

Overview
- Status: Open
- Owner: KiwiRail
- Locale: North Island, New Zealand
- Termini: Wellington; Maungawhau

Service
- Type: Heavy rail
- System: New Zealand railway network
- Services: Northern Explorer, Capital Connection, Te Huia
- Operator(s): KiwiRail (freight); Great Journeys New Zealand (long-distance passenger); Transdev Wellington (Wellington–Waikanae commuter); Auckland One Rail (Pukekohe–Auckland commuter)
- Rolling stock: EF class electric locomotives (Te Rapa – Palmerston North)

History
- Opened: 14 August 1908 (railheads meet); 6 November 1908 (official opening); 14 February 1909 (line completed)

Technical
- Line length: 684.98 km (425.63 mi)
- Num of tracks: Triple track: Wellington–Wairarapa Line junction, Westfield – Wiri; Double track: Wairarapa Line junction–Pukerua Bay, Paekākāriki–Waikanae, Hamilton–Te Kauwhata, Amokura–Auckland remainder single track
- Character: Main line
- Track gauge: 1,067 mm (3 ft 6 in)
- Electrification: 1500 V DC overhead Wellington–Waikanae; 25 kV 50 Hz AC overhead Palmerston North–Te Rapa, Pukekohe–Britomart
- Operating speed: 110 km/h (68 mph) maximum
- Highest elevation: 832 metres (2,730 ft)

The North Island Main Trunk (NIMT) is the main railway line in the North Island of New Zealand, connecting the capital city Wellington with the country's largest city, Auckland. The line is 682 kilometres (424 mi) long, built to the New Zealand rail gauge of 1,067 mm (3 ft 6 in) and serves the large cities of Palmerston North and Hamilton.

Around 520 km (320 mi)–approximately 75%–of the line is electrified in three separate sections: one section at 1500 V DC between Wellington and Waikanae (55 km, 34 mi), and two sections at 25 kV AC: 412 km (256 mi) between Palmerston North and Te Rapa (Hamilton) and 50 km (31 mi) between Pukekohe and Auckland Britomart.

The first section of what became the NIMT opened in 1873 in Auckland. Construction at the Wellington end began in 1885. The line was completed in 1908 and was fully operational by 1909. It is credited for having been an economic lifeline, and for having opened up the centre of the North Island to European settlement and investment. In the early days, a passenger journey between Wellington and Auckland could take more than 20 hours; today, it takes approximately 11 hours.

The NIMT has been described as an "engineering miracle", with numerous engineering feats such as viaducts, tunnels and a spiral built to overcome large elevation differences with grades suitable for steam engines, the ruling gradient being 1 in 50. When built the Makatote Viaduct was the highest viaduct in the country.

== History ==
=== Construction ===
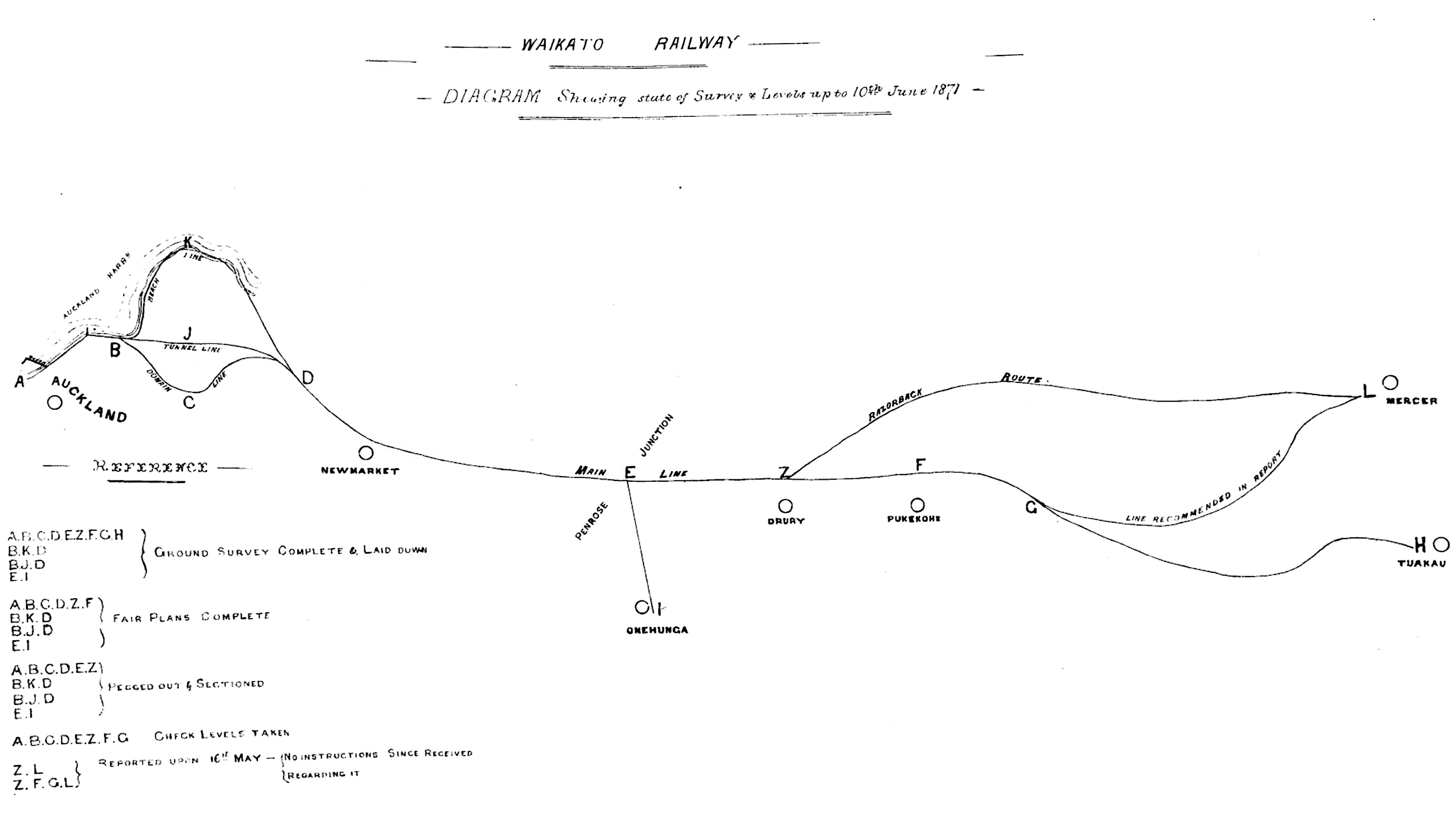
1871 Mercer railway survey

When the first sections of the NIMT were built, there was great uncertainty as to whether the initial terminus on the Waikato River would be Mercer, or Tuakau (see 1871 map of possible routes), and, within Waikato in 1872, Cambridge, Kihikihi, Te Awamutu and Alexandra were possible destinations. The central section was gradually extended to meet up in 1909, 23 years after the last of the northern and southern sections of NIMT had been opened.

==== Auckland to Te Awamutu ====
Auckland's first railway was the 13 km (8.1 mi) line between Point Britomart and Onehunga via Penrose, opened in 1873. It was built by Brogdens, as was the rest of the Auckland & Mercer Railway, for £166,000 for the 41 mi (66 km) to Mercer. The section from Penrose to Onehunga is now called the Onehunga Branch. The line was later continued south from Penrose into the Waikato. To support the Invasion of the Waikato, a 3.5 mi (5.6 km) tramway was built from Maungatāwhiri to Meremere in 1864, with a first sod event near Koheroa on Tuesday, 29 March 1864 by Auckland's Chief Superintendent of Roads & Bridges, W R Collett. Turning of the first sod of the Auckland and Drury Railway took place in 1865, a year after the last major battle. By 1867 the Provincial Government had run out of money and an Amendment Act was passed. In 1870, the resident engineer proposed cutting costs by reducing the gauge from standard to 3 ft 6 in gauge, though rolling stock had been bought for the wider gauge. In 1872 contracts were let to Owen Jones and to Brogdens and work was soon reported as well under way. This line reached Mercer by 20 May 1875, with 29 km (18 mi) from Ngāruawāhia being constructed by the Volunteer Engineer Militia and opened on 13 August 1877. It was extended to Frankton by December 1877, to Ōhaupō on 4 June 1878 and to Te Awamutu on 1 July 1880. An economic downturn stalled construction for the next five years, and Te Awamutu remained the railhead. There were negotiations with local Māori, and the King Country south of Te Awamutu (from the boundary of the Puniu River) was not accessible to Europeans until 1883.

==== Wellington to Marton ====
The Longburn to Marton section had been opened on 18 April 1878, as part of the line linking the ports of Foxton and Whanganui.

The Wellington-Longburn (near Palmerston North) section was constructed between 1881 and 1886 by the Wellington and Manawatu Railway Company (WMR). The company was acquired by the government and merged with the New Zealand Railways Department in 1908.

==== Central North Island ====
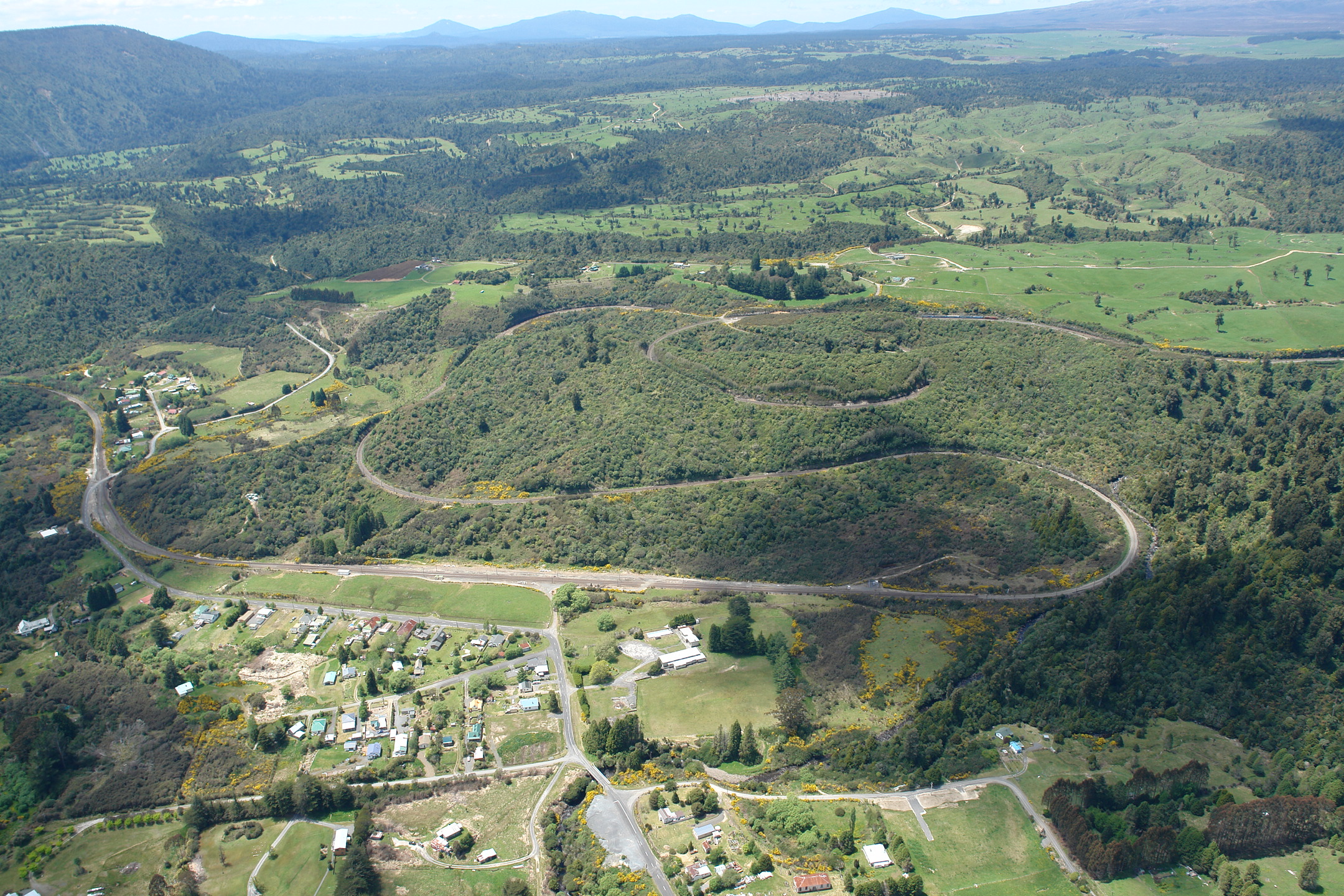
Panorama of the Raurimu Spiral.

In 1882, the Whitaker Ministry intiated the North Island Main Trunk Railway Loan Act, which was passed by the General Assembly, to expedite construction of the North Island Main Trunk south of Te Awamutu by authorising the overseas borrowing of a million pounds for the work, with the final route to be approved by the General Assembly following surveys of potential routes, for which £10,000 were allocated.

From Te Awamutu, it was proposed that the line be built via Taupo or via Taumarunui, the eventual route. Four options were considered before the Minister of Public Works decided on the present route in 1884, but, when it was realised just how difficult that route was, further surveys considered two other options in 1888. Routes via Napier and Waitara were also considered, with surveying in Taranaki from 1883 to 1889.

Construction of the final central section began on 15 April 1885, when paramount chief Wahanui of Ngāti Maniapoto turned the first sod outside Te Awamutu. It was 23 years before the two lines met, as the central section was difficult to survey and construct. The crossing of the North Island Volcanic Plateau with deep ravines required nine viaducts and the world-famous Raurimu Spiral.

Richard Seddon’s Liberal Government pledged in 1903 that the whole route would be open in 1908. In 1904, the railheads were still 146 km (91 mi) apart, and contracts for three massive viaducts (Makatote, Hapuawhenua and Taonui) were not let until 1905. The government committed 2500 workmen, and in 1907, the Minister of Public Works William Hall-Jones instigated a night shift (under kerosene lamps). By the beginning of 1908, there was a 39 km (24 mi) gap between Erua and Ohakune, with a connecting horse-drawn coach service. From Ohakune south to Waiouru, the Public Works Department operated the train, as this section of 27 km (17 mi) had not yet been handed over to the Railways Department.

==== Opening ====
The gap was closed on 7 August 1908 for the first through passenger train, the 11-car Parliamentary Special carrying the prime minister Sir Joseph Ward and other parliamentarians north to see the American Great White Fleet at Auckland. But much of the new section was temporary, with some cuttings north of Taonui having vertical batters and unballasted track from Horopito to Makatote. Ward drove the last spike on 6 November 1908, and the 'Last Spike' monument is at Manganui-o-te-Ao 39°16.44′S 175°23.37′E, near Pokaka. A two-day NIMT service started on 9 November, with an overnight stop at Ohakune (for northbound passengers) or Taumarunui (for southbound passengers).

On 14 February 1909, the first NIMT express left Auckland for Wellington, an overnight trip scheduled to take 19 hours 15 minutes, with a sleeping car, day cars with reclining seats, and postal/parcels vans. The dining car went on the north express from Wellington to Ohakune, then transferred to the southbound express, so avoiding the heavy gradients of the central section.

=== Upgrades and deviations ===
==== Signals and track ====
Most of the NIMT is single track with frequent passing loops, but sections at each end that also handle suburban commuter traffic are double tracked:

- The section known as the North-South Junction between Wellington and Waikanae, except for 3.3 km (2.1 mi) of single-track through tunnels between North Junction (35.3 km (21.9 mi) from Wellington) and South Junction, (32 km (20 mi) from Wellington), on the Pukerua Bay to Paekākāriki section,
- between Hamilton and Te Kauwhata (except for the single-track Waikato River Bridge at Ngāruawāhia), and
- between Meremere and Maungawhau.

The rails and signalling have been upgraded over the years, and many sections of the line have been deviated: The original 1870s Vogel Era track had rails of 40 lb/yd (19.9 kg/m), some were iron not steel; later rails were 53 lb/yd (26.3 kg/m); and from 1901 70 lb/yd (34.8 kg/m), e.g. between Taumarunui and Taihape for the heavy X class locomotives used on the central mountainous section from 1908. Some 10 bridges between Frankton and Taumarunui had to be strengthened, and in 1914 there was still 129 km (80 mi) of 53 lb/yd rail to be replaced. In the 1930s 85 lb/yd (42.2 kg/m) was adopted, then 91 lb/yd (45.1 kg/m), and from 1974 100 lb/yd (50 kg/m).

Signalling on the single-track sections (most of the line) was controlled by Tyer's Electric Train Tablet No 7 system; with each of the stations for the 94 tablet sections staffed by three tablet porters each working a 56-hour week for continuous coverage; hence each station required at least four houses for the stationmaster and three porters. Pierre noticed that with CTC station buildings and even platforms had been removed as there were no longer any staffed stations between Ohakune and National Park. The Train Control system introduced from 1928 to 1932 supplemented the tablet system by operators at the four sections (Auckland, Frankton, Te Kuiti, Ohakune, Marton and Wellington) to expedite operation of trains over several tablet sections; the 1925 Fay-Raven report urged its adoption because of the fitful progress of mixed trains, with locomotives often kept waiting. From 1938 to 1966 Centralised Traffic Control (CTC) gradually replaced the tablet system on the NIMT. In 1957 when the installation of CTC over the remaining 354 km (220 mi) commenced, it was estimated that using CTC over the 330 km (205 mi) Taumarunui to Otaki section with control centres at Ohakune (which shifted to Taumarunui in 1977), Taihape and Palmerston North would replace 74 men in traffic working duties. The last section converted was Piriaka-Owhango.

A 1926 article by "Backblocks" described conditions for staff at these stations where four workers lived in isolated areas, and their efforts to get special trains for transport to special events.

In 1913, the maximum speed limit on the NIMT was raised to 45 mph (72 km/h), reducing the journey time by 1 hour 25 minutes Auckland-Wellington or to 17 hours and between 30 and 45 minutes. Under Thomas Ronayne, the New Zealand Railways Department general manager from 1895 to 1913, the section south to Parnell was duplicated and improvements made to the worst gradients and tight curves between Auckland and Mercer. Under his successor E. H. Hiley the second Parnell Tunnel with two tracks and an easier gradient was completed in 1915–1916. On the Kakariki bank between Halcombe and Marton a deviation reduced the 1 in 53 grade to 1 in 70 in 1915. Similar work was done to ease the gradient to Greatford, on the other side of the Rangitīkei River, in 1939. A 1914 Act authorised spending on the Westfield Deviation, new stations at Auckland and Wellington, track doubling (Penrose-Papakura, Ohinewai-Huntly, Horotiu-Frankton, Newmarket-New Lynn), and grade easements from Penrose to Te Kuiti, but the war delayed most of these works for over a decade.

In 1927, automatic colour-light signalling was installed from Otahuhu to Mercer. In 1930 the signalling was extended 34 mi 72 ch (56.2 km) to Frankton and the 6 mi 55 ch (10.8 km) from there to Horotiu was doubled. The 3 mi 54 ch (5.9 km) north to Ngāruawāhia was doubled from 5 December 1937, followed by 9 mi 12 ch (14.7 km) Ngāruawāhia to Huntly on 4 December 1938 and Huntly to Ohinewai and Papakura to Paerata in December 1939. By then, wartime shortages delayed further double-tracking. Pokeno to Mercer was doubled from 11 November 1951, Pukekohe to Pokeno 21 November 1954, Mercer to Amokura 1 July 1956 and Ohinewai to Te Kauwhata 14 December 1958. The 13 km (8.1 mi) between Amokura and Te Kauwhata remain single track, as does Ngāruawāhia bridge. Doubling of the section south of Amokura is being investigated in a business case from July 2021.

==== Westfield deviation ====
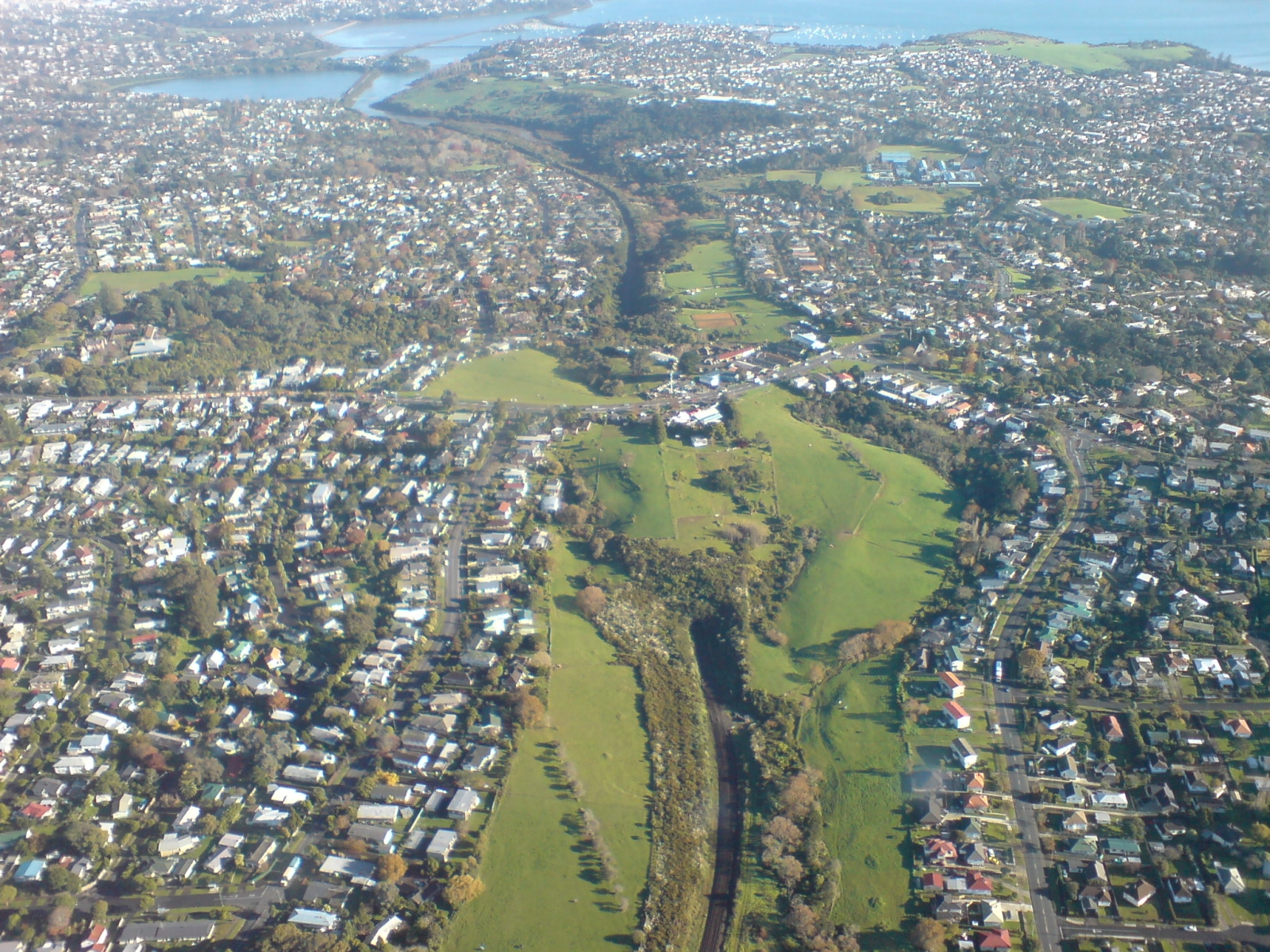
Eastern Transport Corridor in St. Johns.

In 1930, the Westfield deviation was opened, creating a new eastern route from Auckland to Westfield via Glen Innes and Hobsons Bay, running into the new Auckland railway station and providing better access to the Port of Auckland. The original section between Auckland and Westfield via Newmarket later ceased to be part of the NIMT: Auckland to Newmarket became the Auckland-Newmarket Line, and Newmarket to Westfield became part of the North Auckland Line (NAL) which runs between Whangarei and Westfield.

In the late 1930s, bridges replaced level crossings at Ohinewai, Taupiri and Hopuhopu.

==== Tawa flat deviation ====
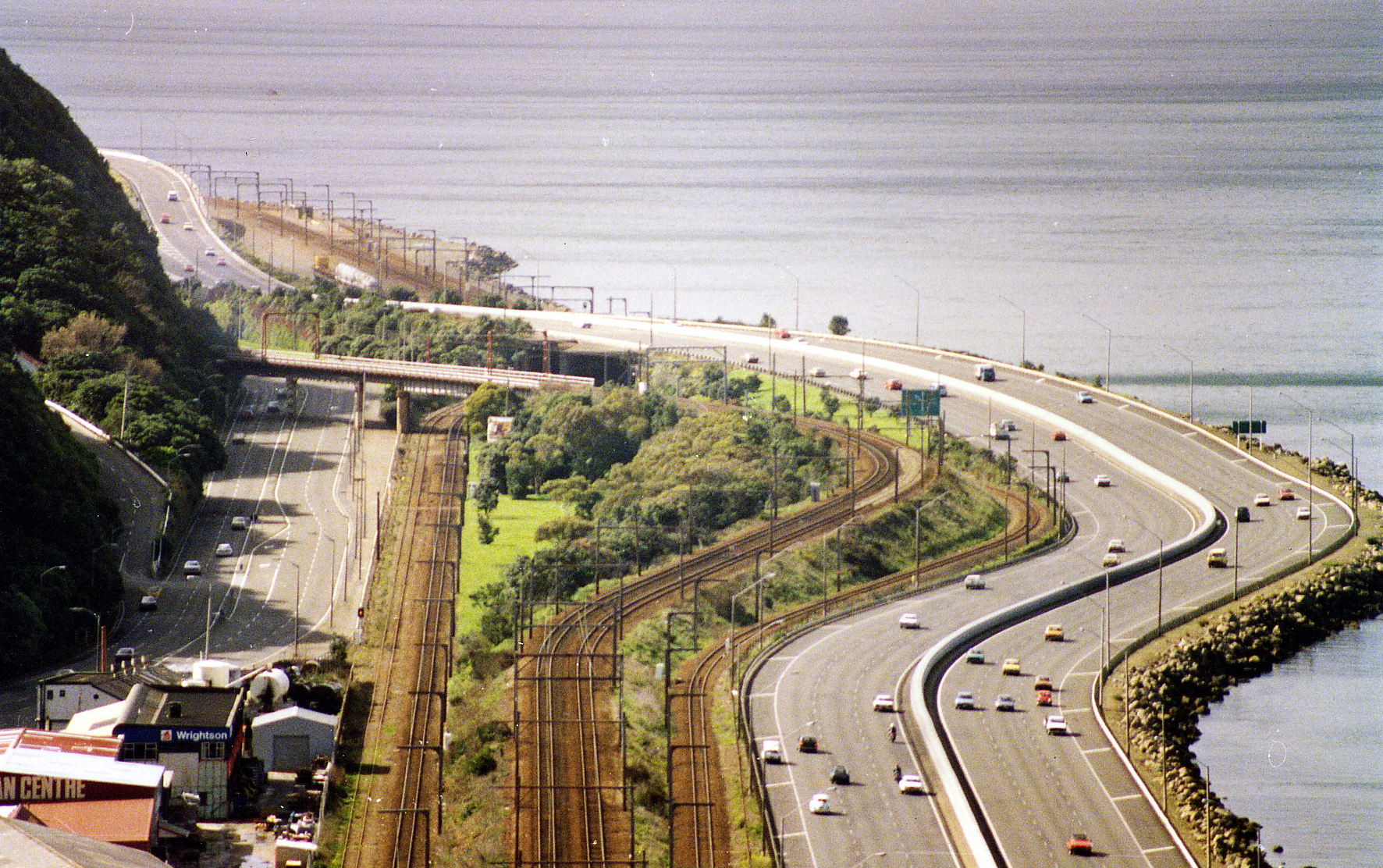
In the 1930s, the Wellington end was deviated from Wellington to Tawa Flat by the Tawa Flat deviation, including two long tunnels. The deviation is the centre two tracks, with the Wairarapa Line's Ngauranga station in the background, alongside State Highway 1.

The double track Tawa Flat deviation opened to goods trains on 22 July 1935 and to passenger trains on 19 June 1937, bypassing the original single track WMR line between Wellington and Tawa. With a pair of tunnels under the Wellington hills, the deviation alleviated issues with more and heavier freight traffic on the steep and twisting original route where long sections at 1 in 60 gradient required banker engines. The Wellington to Johnsonville section of the original line was retained as the Johnsonville Line and the Johnsonville to Tawa section closed.

The North-South Junction section from Plimmerton to South Junction, north of Pukerua Bay and Muri, and North Junction to Paekākāriki were duplicated in 1940. From 24 July 1940 electrification at 1500 V DC of the southern section of the NIMT from Wellington to Paekākāriki was completed. The Tawa Flat deviation has a long tunnel (Tawa No 2) not suitable for steam operation because of excessive smoke (although steam trains were temporarily operated in the new deviation from 1935). A Centralised Train Control (CTC) system was installed in 1940, so that new signal boxes were not required and five stations between Tawa and Pukerua Bay no longer had to be continually staffed for Tablet operation; see Kāpiti Line and North–South Junction. Electrification eliminated the need to relieve the steep (1 in 57) gradients from Plimmerton to the Pukerua Bay summit by a deviation to the east and allowed more frequent suburban passenger trains (and allowed suburban electric multiple units to run on this section from September 1949).

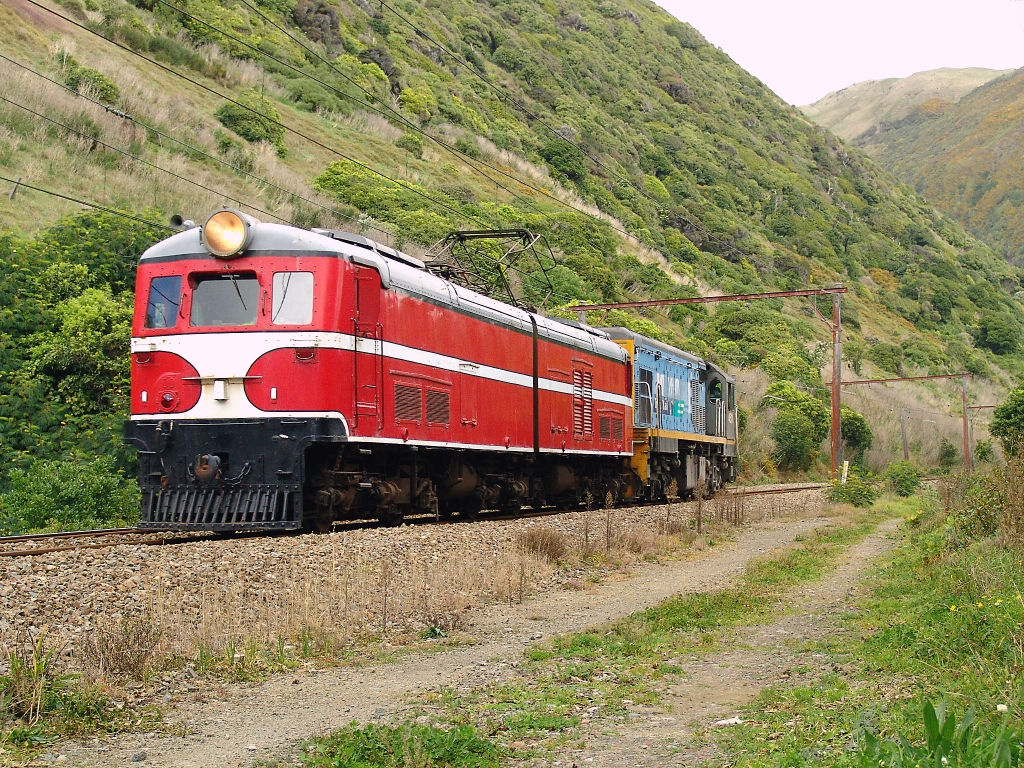
EW1805 hauling DC 4611 near Paekākāriki on the electrified Wellington section. This section of the North Island Main Trunk was electrified in 1940.

The difficult section down the Paekakariki Escarpment from Pukerua Bay to Paekākāriki with five tunnels between South and North Junctions remains single track. Duplication from Tawa to Porirua opened on 15 December 1957, from Porirua to Paremata on 7 November 1960, and Paremata to Plimmerton on 16 October 1961. The section between Porirua and Plimmerton was straightened in conjunction with the duplication by reclaiming land along the eastern shore of Porirua Harbour.

In 1967, the floors of the tunnels on the former WMR section between Paekākāriki and Pukerua Bay were lowered to enable the D^{A} class locomotives to travel all the way to Wellington.

==== Milson deviation ====
Between 1964 and 1966, the Milson deviation on the edge of Palmerston North took trains away from the centre of the city.

==== Mangaweka deviation ====
Between 1973 and 1981, the major Mangaweka deviation in the central section between Mangaweka and Utiku was built, with three viaducts, all over 70m tall, crossing the Rangitīkei and Kawhatau rivers. The viaducts were at the end of their economic lives. The deviation removed a number of tunnels, many of which were built in unstable country, and eliminated a number of steep gradients.

A combined road and rail deviation had been considered with the Ministry of Works, but was too expensive. In 1966 the NZR General Manager Alan Gandell said that the deviation would eliminate five old and narrow tunnels, and that New Zealand topography precluded a fast run, but travel time would be cut from 13½ hours to between 11½ and 12 hours, the best possible without tremendous expense. But two modern express trains were being designed for the NIMT, and should be introduced in three to four years.

==== Ohakune–Horopito deviation ====
The central section from Te Rapa near Hamilton to Palmerston North was electrified between 1984 and 1988 as part of the Think Big government energy program. Some tunnels were opened out or bypassed by deviations while in others clearances were increased and curves eased. The section between Ohakune and Horopito was realigned, with three viaducts replaced to handle higher loads and speeds. The most notable bridge replaced was the curved metal viaduct at Hapuawhenua, which was replaced with a modern concrete structure, though the original has been restored as a tourist attraction.

==== Recent upgrades ====
In 1980, the 1880s Poro-O-Tarao Tunnel in the King Country was replaced by a tunnel with clearances which allowed for large hicube shipping containers.

In 2009–10, the 1.5 km (0.93 mi) section of line between Wellington Junction and Distant Junction was rebuilt from double track to triple track, to ease peak-time congestion.

In February 2011, duplication between Paekākāriki and Waikanae was completed as part of the upgrade and expansion of the Wellington suburban network; see Kāpiti Line for more information.

In 2012–13, four bridges near Rangiriri between Auckland and Hamilton were replaced. The bridges were all over 100 years old with steel spans and timber piers, and were replaced by modern low-maintenance concrete ballast deck bridges. Bridges 479, 480, 481 & 482 were replaced, with lengths of 40 metres (131 ft 3 in), 40 metres (131 ft 3 in), 30 metres (98 ft 5 in) and 18 metres (59 ft 1 in) respectively.

The construction of the Peka Peka to Otaki section of the Kāpiti Expressway required 1.3 km (0.81 mi) of the NIMT immediately north of Otaki station to be realigned. Construction began in 2017, and trains were switched onto the new alignment over the 2019 Easter long weekend (19–22 April).

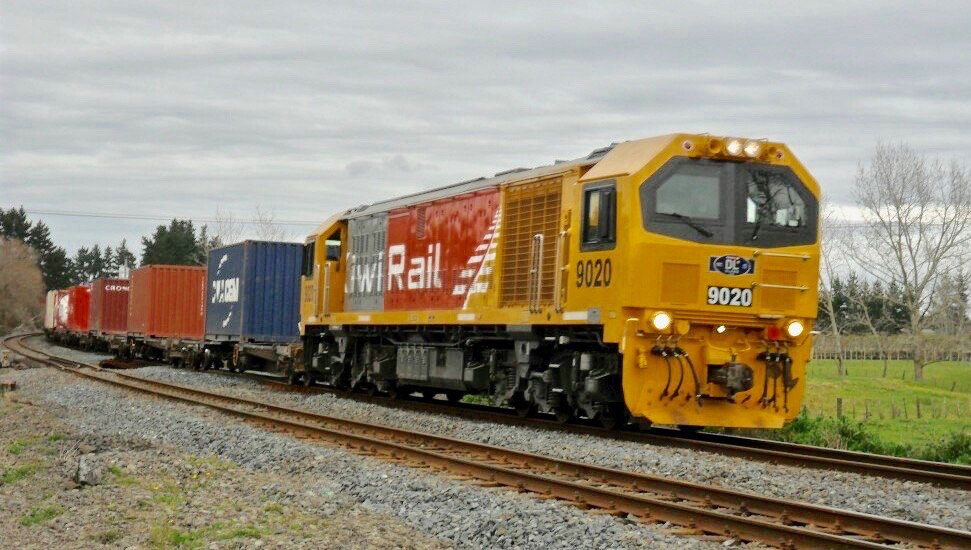
A DL class locomotive hauling a freight train at Papakura, south of Auckland. Freight is an important revenue earner for the North Island Main Trunk.

In the Auckland area, a third main line between Wiri and Westfield was opened on 18 September 2025 to allow freight (or other) trains to bypass stationary passenger trains.

=== Electrification ===
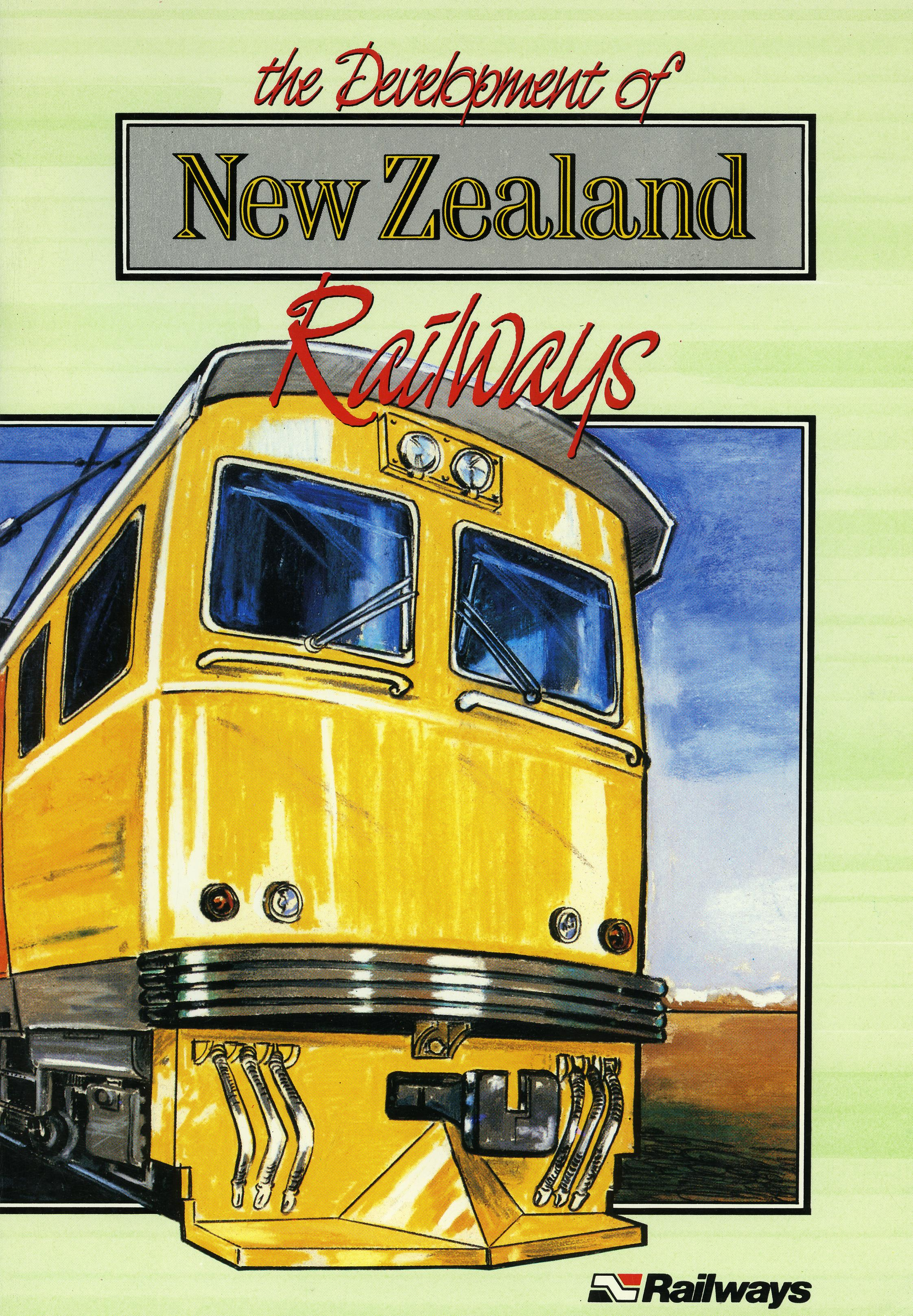
The electrification of the central section of the North Island Main Trunk was completed in June 1988

There are three independent sections of the NIMT which are electrified: Auckland's urban network and the central section from Palmerston North – Te Rapa (north of Hamilton) at 25 kV AC. Wellington's urban network is electrified at 1700 V DC.

==== Wellington ====
The first part of the NIMT to be electrified was the Wellington–Paekakariki section via the Tawa Flat deviation that was completed on 24 July 1940. This was largely to prevent smoke nuisance in the 4.3 km No. 2 tunnel, and to provide for banking on the Paekakariki to Pukerua Bay section. Electric traction in this section is now used only by Transdev Wellington for Metlink suburban passenger services on the Kāpiti Line, and was extended to Paraparaumu on 7 May 1983 and Waikanae on 20 February 2011. Funded by the Greater Wellington Regional Council, the extension to Waikanae coincided with the delivery of new FP class Matangi electric multiple units.

Wellington's urban network was electrified at 1500 V DC; as formerly used in other sections of the New Zealand network. In Wellington the operating voltage has been increased to 1650V DC, and 1700V DC since the full introduction of the Matangi EMU, to increase the power available.

==== Central Section ====
The 411 km (255 mi) section between Palmerston North and Hamilton was electrified at 25 kV 50 Hz AC, opened on 24 June 1988 as one of the Muldoon National Government's "Think Big" energy development projects. An overall cost in excess of $100 million had been projected, with some 40% being for the locomotives, but the final cost was about $250 million. The economics of the project was greatly undermined by the fall of the price of oil in the 1980s and the deregulation of land transport, which removed the long-distance monopoly NZR held when the cost-benefit report was written.

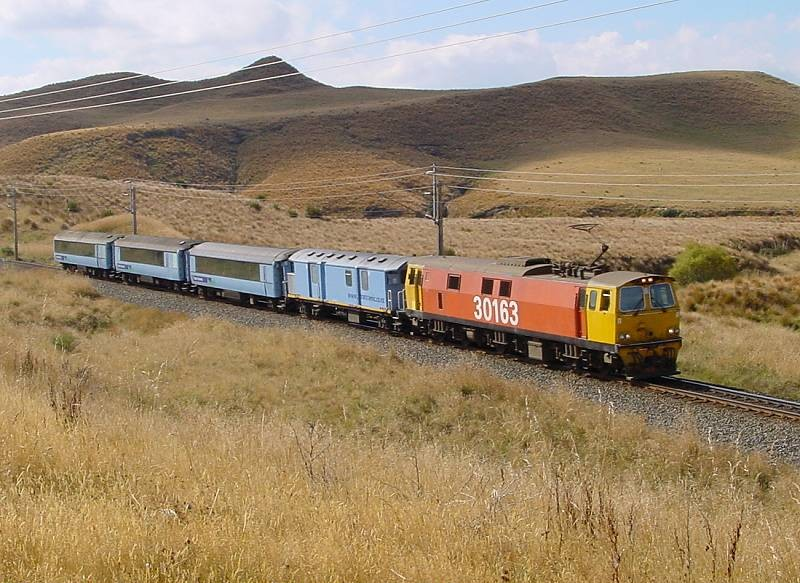
EF30163 hauling The Overlander on the 25 kV AC electrified section on 22 March 2003.

The electrification of the section, which had its genesis in a study group set up in June 1974 to report on measures to be taken to cope with increasing rail traffic volumes, received approval in 1980. This led to a technical study carried out with assistance from the Japanese Railway Technical Research Institute. The report stated that track capacity would be increased by electrification because such traction is faster and able to move more freight at once. The report stated, for example, that whereas a diesel locomotive could haul 720-tonne trains at 27 km/h (17 mph) up the Raurimu Spiral, an electric locomotive could haul 1100/1200-tonne trains at 45 km/h (28 mph), cutting 3–5 hours off journey times. Less fuel would be needed and employing regenerative braking in electric locomotives lowers the fuel consumption further.

Electrification's advantages were reflected in the economic evaluation in the report, which showed a rate of return of 18%. Sensitivity analysis showed that this high rate of return gave the project robustness against lower traffic volumes than expected (the return remained positive even if traffic fell), against significant increases in construction cost, and against lower than expected rises in the diesel fuel price.

Part of the project included replacing the copper wire communications system with a new fibre optic communications cable (due to interference caused by AC power with the DC copper wire system) between Wellington and Auckland. In 1994 New Zealand Rail Limited sold the cable to Clear Communications for telephone traffic, leasing part of it back for signalling.

==== Auckland ====
Proposals to electrify the Auckland suburban rail network dated back to the 1960s, they mainly coincided with proposals to electrify the NIMT in its entirety. In 2005 the central government decided to implement a proposal to electrify the urban network at 25 kV AC, the same system as on the central NIMT. This included 35.7 km (22.2 mi) of the NIMT itself, from Britomart to just south of Papakura. Work on electrification of the Auckland network began in 2010. The first revenue electric services using AM class EMUs commenced on 28 April 2014 between Britomart and Onehunga on the Onehunga Line. The electrification project on the Auckland network, including the Auckland-Papakura section of the NIMT, was completed in July 2015, with all suburban services being electric. A diesel shuttle service ran on the non-electrified Pukekohe-Papakura section from 2015 until 2022.

In February 2008 former Auckland Regional Council Chairman Mike Lee suggested the initial electrification might be extended to Pukekohe, leaving a 60 kilometres (37 mi) gap to Te Rapa. In 2012, in response to public submissions, the board of Auckland Transport decided to include an investigation into electrifying to Pukekohe to its 10-year programme. ATAP, Auckland's 2018–2028 plan provides for Pukekohe electrification, a third line from Westfield to Wiri and further new electric trains. In 2020 the government announced funding for electrification from Papakura to Pukekohe. The extension of electrification to Pukekohe was completed in August 2024.

==== Past proposals ====
Electrification of the NIMT was mooted by electrical engineer Evan Parry in the first volume of the New Zealand Journal of Science and Technology in November 1918. In light of a national coal shortage following World War I, Parry argued that the network was under great strain due to ever-increasing volumes of freight, and the use of steam traction was partly to blame. Parry also noted that there was great potential for cheap hydro-electricity generation in the central North Island to power electrification.

Following the Second World War railway services suffered due to skill and coal shortages. Skilled staff sought employment opportunities elsewhere in the economy. From 1948 to 1951 the General Manager of the Railways Department , Frank Aickin advocated electrification of the entire line, despite protests from his engineering staff. Aickin had previously been Staff Superintendent and Chief Legal Advisor to the Department and considered using diesel locomotives for trains on the NIMT to be too expensive. He turned his attention to electrification, mainly because he saw that it could relieve the coal shortage and prevent heavy expenditure on imported fuels.

He commissioned a study into electrification, which concluded that a low-frequency AC system could be cheaper than 1500 V DC, the system in use in Wellington. Aickin sent a technical mission of four senior officers overseas in March 1949 and travelled overseas himself to negotiate a tentative contract with a British construction company. The Chief Mechanical Engineer and Chief Accountant specified and costed the system and Aickin was able to complete a substantial report justifying the NIMT electrification and submit it to the Government.

Officers from New Zealand Treasury and the Ministry of Works and two experts from Sweden (Thelander and Edenius) commented on the proposal and in December 1950 the Government granted approval in principle and agreed to appoint Thelander as a consultant. Aickin later fell out with the then National Government and retired as General Manager in July 1951. With the change in regime, the electrification proposal disappeared.

A key assumption of Aickin's report was that traffic on the NIMT would grow by 50% from 1948 to 1961. Since a diesel-electric locomotive is a travelling power station, the savings through electrification compared to diesel could be regarded as the difference between the cost of buying bulk electrical energy generated substantially from New Zealand resources and the cost of generating electricity in a small plant using imported diesel fuel.

The Royal Commission on Railways created following Aickin's tenure rejected the report's findings. Aickin's successor Horace Lusty, revised the contract with English Electric to specify D^{F} class diesel-electric locomotives. They were later found to be unreliable, and only ten were supplied. 42 D^{G} class locomotives were supplied instead for secondary lines. For main lines including the NIMT, the General Motors G12 export models were ordered, becoming the D^{A} class.

==== Future ====
The completion of Auckland's electrification leaves a gap of 87.1 km (54.1 mi) to the central NIMT electrification at Te Rapa, north of Hamilton. Electrification may be extended south as the Auckland suburban system expands, but this will depend on further government funding.

A paper written in 2008 for then railway infrastructure owner ONTRACK investigated the possibility of electrifying the remaining Papakura-Te Rapa gap between the Auckland urban system's terminus at Papakura on the NIMT and the central NIMT system, along with electrification of the East Coast Main Trunk to Tauranga. The report put the total cost of electrification at $860 million, with $433 million for the Papakura-Te Rapa section. It concluded that money would be better spent on grade and curvature easements, removing speed restrictions and increasing the length of passing loops.

In Wellington, there is an 80.8 km (50.2 mi) gap from Waikanae to the central NIMT electrification at Palmerston North. As the two electrification systems are different, multi-current locomotives or multiple units would be required for through electric working. Replacement rolling stock for Wellington, Wairarapa and Palmerston North and extending electrification north of Waikanae to Levin and beyond are being investigated in a business case from July 2021. KiwiRail has indicated it has no plans to upgrade the Wellington electrification from 1500 V DC to 25 kV AC, but intends to use dual-voltage locomotives. It has also indicated any extension north of Waikanae station would be at 25 kV AC, with through workings from Wellington to Ōtaki and further north requiring multi-current rolling stock; this would also allow the 25 kV AC section to be fed from the existing 220 kV substation at Paraparaumu, avoided the cost of building a new substation.

On 21 December 2016, KiwiRail announced their plan to withdraw from service, over a two-year period, the EF class electric locomotives (the only electric rolling stock working the central electrified section) without replacing them. The reasons given for the decision included the fact that the EFs are now close to their end of life (approximately 30 years old) and suffer from frequent breakdowns (on average every 30,000 kilometres (19,000 mi) which is well below the expected breakdown-free service interval of 50,000 kilometres (31,000 mi)) and that having to change from a diesel locomotive to an electric one and back again at each end of the electrified section is labour-intensive, time-consuming and adds to costs. KiwiRail did not intend to de-electrify the section but would maintain it so that electric rolling stock could be reintroduced in the future.

On 30 October 2018, the Government announced that it would retain the EF class electric locomotives, to help meet its long term emissions goals and boost the economy. The 15 remaining EF class locomotives were due to be refurbished by KiwiRail by the end of 2025 and will continue to run between Hamilton and Palmerston North.

In 2021 the "North Island Electrification Expansion Study" was published by KiwiRail, Beca and Systra following a government grant for a business case. The report recommended electrification from Waikanae to Palmerston North be 25kV AC, with a change over just north of Waikanae to allow multi-current electric locomotives to switch between AC and DC traction. The cost of electrifying this section of the NIMT was at an expected estimate of $339m, with the Pukekohe to Te Rapa section estimated at $430m.

Electrification status
| Section | Length | Traction | Percentage of total |
|---|---|---|---|
| Wellington to Waikanae | 57 km | DC | 8.4% |
| Waikanae to Palmerston North | 81 km | none | 11.9% |
| Palmerston North to Hamilton (Te Rapa) | 404 km | AC | 59.2% |
| Hamilton (Te Rapa) to Pukekohe | 79 km | none | 11.6% |
| Pukekohe to Britomart | 61 km | AC | 8.9% |

Electrification totals
| Electrified | 496 km | 73% |
| Electrified (future committed) | 26 km | 4% |
| No traction | 160 km | 23% |

=== Centennial ===
On 6 August 2008, at 9am, a train (which included 100-year-old carriage AA1013, restored by the Mainline Steam Trust) departed Wellington in a re-enactment of 7 August 1908 Parliamentary Special carrying the Prime Minister Sir Joseph Ward to Auckland, stopping overnight at Taihape and Taumarunui before continuing to Auckland. Tickets were by invitation only.

A series of stamps was issued to commemorate the centennial:

- 50c – Last Spike Ceremony Manganui-o-te-ao – a photo of actual event.
- $1.00 – Taumarunui, 1958 – steam locomotive KA 947 pulling into the old railway station.
- $1.50 – Makatote Viaduct, 1963.
- $2.00 – Raurimu Spiral, 1964.
- $2.50 – The Overlander, Hapuawhenua Viaduct, 2003.

== Infrastructure ==
The NIMT has been described as an "engineering miracle", with numerous engineering feats especially along the Rangitīkei River and on the North Island Volcanic Plateau. This included the building of the famous Raurimu Spiral to allow trains to ascend the steep grade from the Whanganui River valley to the North Island Volcanic Plateau.

The NIMT includes 352 bridges and 14 tunnels. The major viaducts include three (North Rangitīkei, South Rangitīkei and Kawhatau) opened in 1981 for the Mangaweka deviation. Five viaducts are over 70 metres (230 ft) high. There are smaller viaducts at Taonui north of Ohakune, and Manganui-o-te-Ao and Mangaturuturu.

The heights and lengths of the main viaducts are:

| Name | Height | Length | Opened | Remarks |
|---|---|---|---|---|
| North Rangitīkei | 81 m or 266 ft | 160 m or 525 ft | 1981 | on Mangaweka deviation |
| Makatote | 79 m or 259 ft | 262 m or 860 ft | 1908 | |
| South Rangitīkei | 78 m or 256 ft | 315 m or 1,033 ft | 1981 | on Mangaweka deviation |
| Kawhatau | 73 m or 240 ft | 160 m or 525 ft | 1981 | on Mangaweka deviation |
| Makohine | 73 m or 240 ft | 229 m or 751 ft | 1902 | |
| Toi Toi | 58 m or 190 ft | 66 m or 217 ft | 1904 | |
| Hapuawhenua | 45 m or 148 ft | 284 m or 932 ft | 1908 | replaced 1987 |
| Hapuawhenua | 51 m or 167 ft | 414 m or 1,358 ft | 1987 | on Ohakune–Horopito deviation |
| Taonui | 44 m or 144 ft | 122 m or 400 ft | 1907 | superseded by Ohakune-Horopito deviation 1987 |
| Waiteti | 36 m or 118 ft | 127 m or 417 ft | 1889 | or Waitete, 130 m or 427 ft long |
| Mangaweka | 48 m or 157 ft | 288 m or 945 ft | 1903 | superseded by Mangaweka deviation in 1981 |

=== Rolling stock ===
Due to its high volume and high value of traffic to NZR and the steep grades in the central section, the NIMT has seen the use of the most powerful locomotives in New Zealand.

When the NIMT opened in 1909, the powerful 4-8-2 X class was introduced to handle heavy traffic over the mountainous central North Island section. Three G class Garratt locomotives were introduced in 1928, but these were not as effective as anticipated. In 1932, the 4-8-4 K class was introduced, and later improved in 1939 with the K^{A} class.

The introduction of the D^{F} class in 1954 began the end of the steam era, and in 1955, with the introduction of the D^{A} class locomotive, major withdrawals of steam locomotives began. 1972 saw the introduction of D^{X} class locomotives and the Silver Fern railcars; the latter remaining in service between Auckland and Wellington until 1991.

With electrification and the introduction of the EF class electric locomotives in the late 1980s, the DX class was mainly reassigned to other areas of the network, including hauling coal on the Midland line in the South Island. Since then, services between Te Rapa and Palmerston North have been worked mainly by the electrics, although some services are still diesel-operated, such as those originating from or terminating on other lines, or originating from within the central section, like the paper pulp freight trains from Karioi.

As of July 2024, regular rolling stock on the NIMT include:

| Class | Image | Type | Cars per set | Number | Operator | Routes | Built |
|---|---|---|---|---|---|---|---|
| FP/FT; Matangi | | EMU | 2 | 83 | Transdev Wellington | Wellington suburban services between Wellington and Waikanae | 2010–12, 2015–16 |
| AM | | EMU | 3 | 72 | Auckland One Rail | Auckland suburban services on East West and South City Lines | 2012–15, 2019–20 |
| SR | | carriage | 4 (Te Huia), 7 (Capital Connection) | 22 | KiwiRail | Te Huia services between Hamilton and Auckland, and Capital Connection services between Palmerston North and Wellington | 1971–75 |

- DC class – all sections
- DFT class – all sections
- DL class – all sections
- EF class – Palmerston North to Te Rapa

== Connecting lines ==
| Line Name | Date Opened | Date Closed | NIMT Junction | Terminus | Length | Notes |
|---|---|---|---|---|---|---|
| North Auckland Line | 20 May 1875 | Open | Maungawhau, Westfield Junction | Otiria | 280.76 km | The southernmost portion from Westfield to Newmarket was originally built as part of the NIMT. |
| East Link | | | Maungawhau | - | 0.839 km | Entirely within Maungawhau station limits. Connects to the North Auckland Line in the eastward direction. |
| Newmarket Line | 24 December 1873 | Open | Quay Park Junction | Newmarket Junction | 2.83 km | Formerly Auckland-Onehunga line 1873–1877, Auckland-Waikato line 1877–1908, NIMT 1908–1974. |
| Manukau Branch | 15 April 2012 | Open | Wiri Junction | Manukau | 1.96 km | |
| Mission Bush Branch | 10 December 1917 | Open | Paerata Junction | Mission Bush | 17.41 km | Formerly Waiuku Branch. Glenbrook Vintage Railway uses the 8 km Glenbrook-Waiuku section. |
| Kimihia Branch | 13 August 1877 | 21 October 2015 | Huntly North | Kimihia Mine | 2.75 km | |
| Rotowaro Branch | 20 December 1915 | Open | Huntly | Rotowaro | 7.97 km | Formerly Glen Afton Branch (14 km long). Bush Tramway Club uses the 2 km section Pukemiro to Glen Afton. |
| Waipa Railway and Coal Co. line | 1 March 1914 | 19 May 1958 | Ngāruawāhia | Wilton Collieries | 10.5 km | Private line. Operated by NZR from 12 August 1935 to closure. |
| East Coast Main Trunk | 20 October 1879 | Open | Frankton Junction | Kawerau | 181.29 km | Formerly Thames Branch (1879–1928). Line reduced in length by Kaimai Deviation, 1978. Former length 230 km. |
| Stratford–Okahukura line | 4 September 1933 | Mothballed 2009 | Okahukura Junction | Stratford | 143.28 km | Leased to Forgotten World Adventures Ltd. |
| Raetihi Branch | 18 December 1917 | 1 January 1968 | Ohakune Junction | Raetihi | 13 km | |
| Marton–New Plymouth line | 4 February 1878 | Open | Marton Junction | Breakwater (New Plymouth) | 212.77 km | |
| Taonui Branch | 17 November 1879 | 14 August 1895 | Taonui | Colyton | 3.5 km | |
| Palmerston North–Gisborne Line | 9 March 1891 | Open | Roslyn Junction | Gisborne | 390.49 km | Napier-Gisborne section mothballed 2012. Gisborne City Vintage Railway use Gisborne-Muriwai section (16 km) |
| Foxton Branch | 27 April 1876 | 18 July 1959 | Longburn Junction | Foxton | 31 km | Part of Foxton-New Plymouth Railway until 1908 |
| Wairarapa Line | 14 April 1874 | Open | Distant Junction (Wellington) | Woodville | 171.50 km | Reduced in length by closure of Rimutaka Incline (1955) from 182 km. |
| Johnsonville Branch | 24 September 1885 | Open | Wellington Junction | Johnsonville | 10.49 km | Built by the Wellington and Manawatu Railway Company. 6 km Johnsonville-Tawa section closed 19 June 1937. |
| Te Aro Branch | 27 March 1893 | 23 April 1917 | Wellington (Lambton) | Te Aro | 1.77 km | |

== Notable connecting tramways and other lines ==
| Junction Station | Date Opened | Date Closed | Owner | Notes |
|---|---|---|---|---|
| Drury | 29 July 1905 | 1921 | Drury Coal Company | 'Mineral railway'. Gauge upgraded and linked to main line in 1908. Replaced an older horse-drawn tramway with wooden tracks. |
| Kellyville | | | Public Works Department | Construction of Pokeno to Paeroa line, not completed beyond Mangatawhiri. |
| Ngāruawāhia | 1 March 1914 | 19 May 1958 | Waipa Railway and Coal Co. | 10 km private railway. |
| Otorohonga | | 1921 | Rangitoto Colliery Co. | 6 km horse tram |
| Mangapehi | | 1944 | Ellis and Bernand | Steam-powered bush tramway |
| Waione Siding | | 1950 | Marton Sash and Door Co | Steam-powered bush tramway |
| Ongarue | | 1956 | Ellis and Bernand | Extensive steam-powered bush tramway (now part of a cycle trail) |
| Taringamotu | 1910 | 1960s | Taringamotu Tramway | Steam-powered bush tramway |
| Manunui | | 1944 | Ellis and Bernand | Extensive steam-powered bush tramway |
| Oio | | 1935 | King Speirs and Co | Steam-powered bush tramway |
| Mansons Siding | | | Manson and Clark | Steam-powered bush tramway |
| Raurimu | | 1935 | King Speirs and Co | Steam-powered bush tramway |
| Raurimu | 1935 | 1957 | Raurimu Sawmilling Co | Steam-powered bush tramway |
| Pokaka | 1930 | 1957 | Pokaka Timber Co | Steam-powered bush tramway |
| Horopito | | | Horopito Sawmills Ltd | Highest railway in New Zealand, summit at 923.5 metres above sea level. |
| Longburn | 27 October 1886 | 7 December 1908 | Wellington and Manawatu Railway Company | Private line, purchased by NZR and incorporated into NIMT |

== Passenger services ==
=== Long-distance ===
From opening, there have been regular passenger services between Wellington and Auckland. The daily "Express" left earlier in the evening, followed by the "Limited", which had fewer stops for passengers.

Between 1963 and 1968, daytime trains were called the Scenic Daylight. In 1968, a Drewery NZR RM class articulated 88-seater railcar was refurbished and repainted in a distinctive blue-and-white scheme that led to it being nicknamed the Blue Streak. It initially operated an unsuccessful service between Hamilton and Auckland in early 1968, and was transferred to the Auckland-Wellington run on 23 September 1968. Note that all self-propelled passenger railcar classes in New Zealand are generically classed 'RM'.

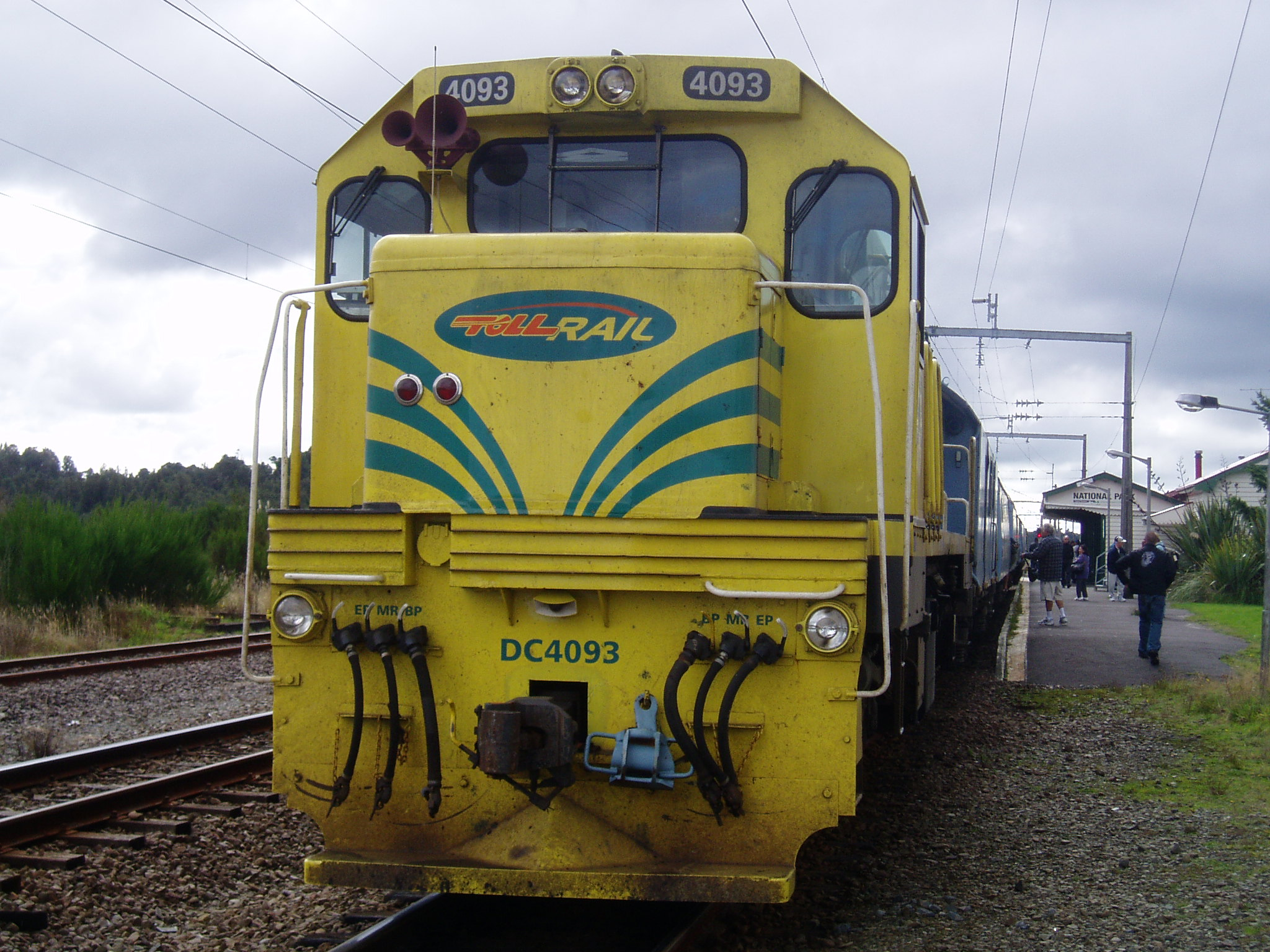
DC class locomotives initially hauled what was then named the Overlander long-distance passenger train between Auckland and Wellington.

In September 1971, NZR introduced the Silver Star, a luxury sleeper train. The service was not economically viable and was withdrawn in 1979. Much more successful was the Silver Fern, a daytime railcar service, introduced in December 1972 to replace the "Blue Streak". This service was withdrawn in December 1991 and replaced by The Overlander.

In conjunction with the introduction of the carriage train Overlander service, the Silver Fern railcars were redeployed to start new services between Tauranga and Auckland – Kaimai Express, and Auckland and Rotorua – Geyserland Express, in December 1991. In June 2000 a new commuter service called the Waikato Connection was introduced between Hamilton and Auckland and ran in conjunction with the services to Tauranga and Rotorua until all three services were cancelled in October 2001.

On 25 July 2006, Toll NZ announced that the Overlander would cease at the end of September 2006, but on 28 September 2006, the train's continuation on a limited timetable was announced. It ran daily during the summer months and thrice-weekly for the balance of the year.

In June 2012, KiwiRail announced the Overlander would be replaced by the Northern Explorer, with modern New Zealand-built AK class carriages to provide a premium tourist train on a quicker timetable with fewer stops. It commenced on Monday 25 June 2012, and consisted of one train running from Auckland-to-Wellington on Mondays, Thursdays and Saturdays, and Wellington-to-Auckland on Wednesdays, Fridays and Sundays. It had fewer stops than the Overlander, stopping only at Papakura, Hamilton, Ōtorohanga, National Park, Ohakune, Palmerston North and Paraparaumu. The Northern Explorer scheduled passenger service was suspended in December 2021. The service was reinstated from 25 September 2022.

In 2021 a new commuter service between Hamilton and Auckland was introduced, named Te Huia.

The Capital Connection commuter train operates between Palmerston North and Wellington.

Both KiwiRail and private enthusiast operators such as the Railway Enthusiasts Society, Mainline Steam and Steam Incorporated operate charter trains.

=== Auckland suburban ===
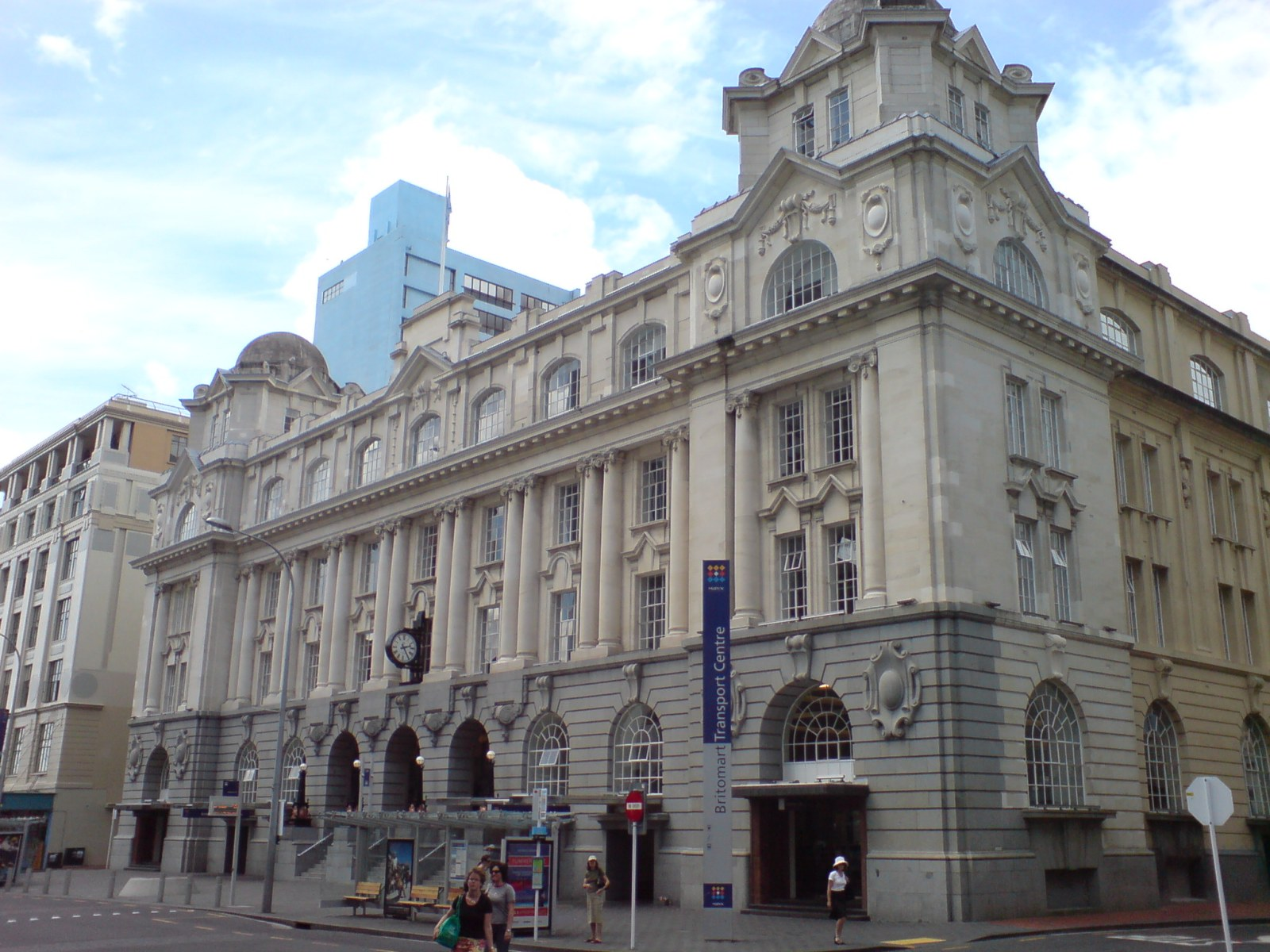
The northern terminus of the NIMT, Britomart.

Suburban trains run on the NIMT at regular intervals as follows:

East West Line (Manukau to Swanson via City Centre) trains run on the NIMT between Puhinui and Maungawhau.

South City Line (Pukekohe to Newmarket via Grafton) trains run on the NIMT from Pukekohe to Westfield Junction. They then run on the North Auckland Line to Grafton, and rejoins the NIMT at Karanga-a-Hape. It then joins the Newmarket Line to the vicinity of Quay Park.

=== Wellington suburban ===
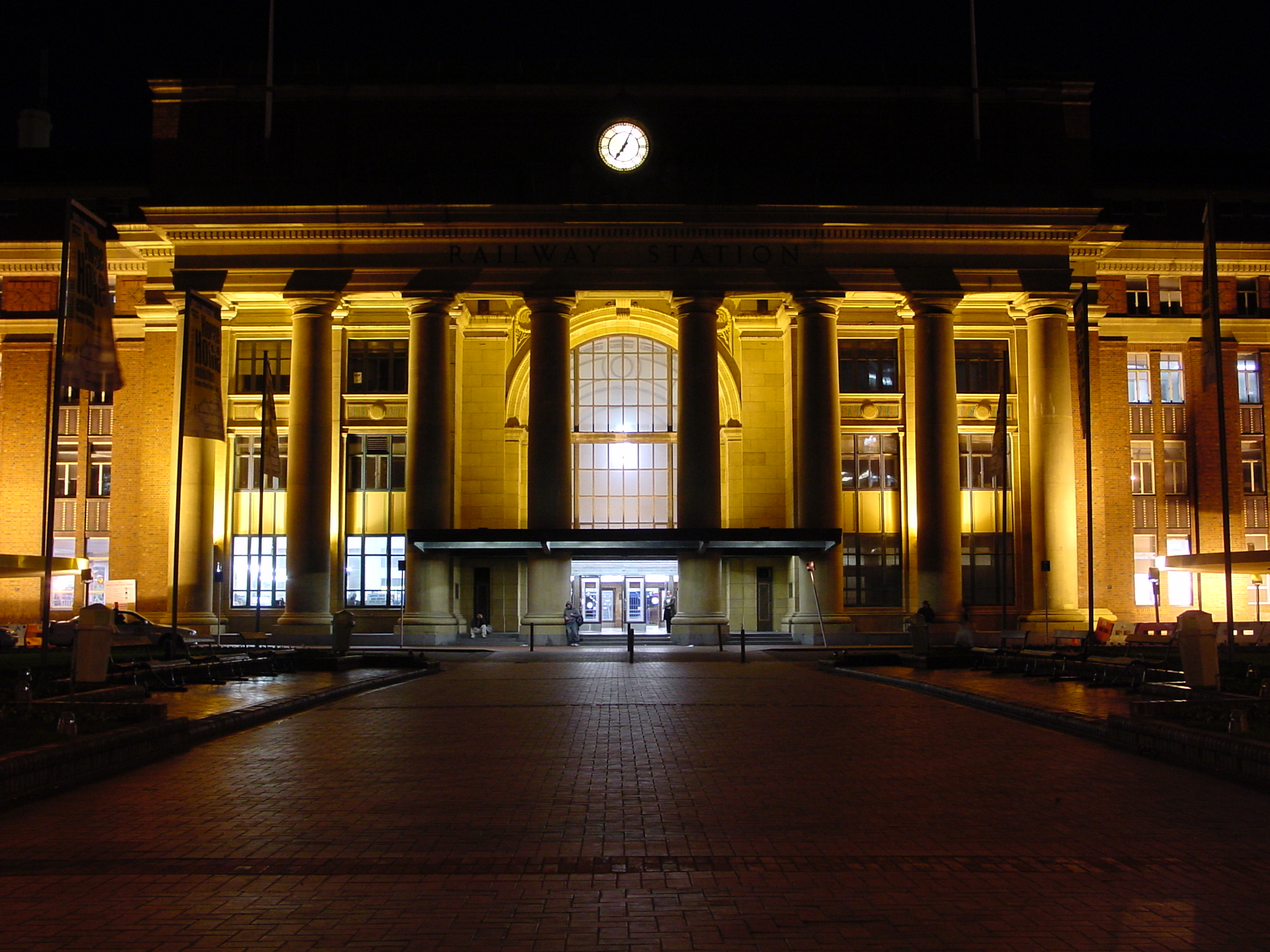
The southern terminus of the North Island Main Trunk, Wellington railway station, and busiest station in the Wellington suburban network.

Wellington's Metlink suburban network, operated by Transdev Wellington, includes the southern portion of the NIMT between Wellington and Waikanae as the Kāpiti Line.

== Stations ==
| Station | Distance from Wellington | Height above sea level (m) | Opened | Closed | Notes |
|---|---|---|---|---|---|
| Wellington | 0 km | 2.4m | 1937 | Open | Replaced NZR's Lambton and WMR's Thorndon stations, which closed upon completion. |
| Lambton | 0 km | 2.4m | 1884 | 1937 | Slightly north of current Wellington station. |
| Pipitea | 0.75 km | 2.4m | 1874 | 1884 | Original Wellington station, on Pipitea Quay. |
| Thorndon | 0.75 km | 2.4m | 1886 | 1937 | Wellington and Manawatu Railway Company, near of Pipitea station |
| Kaiwharawhara | 2.44 km | 2.4m | 1874 | 2013 | Kaiwarra until 1951. |
| Takapu Road | 11.78 km | 41m | 1937 | Open | |
| Redwood | 13.16 km | 26.5m | 1963 | Open | |
| Tawa | 13.58 km | 25.6m | 1937 | Open | Tawa Flat (closed 1937) was 12 metres above Redwood station on adjacent hillside. |
| Linden | 14.85 km | 17.7m | 1940 | Open | |
| Kenepuru | 16.16 km | 15m | 1940 | Open | |
| Porirua | 17.8 km | 3.6m | 1885 | Open | |
| Paremata | 21.7 km | 2.7m | 1885 | Open | |
| Mana | 23.04 km | 3m | 1949 | Open | Dolly Varden until 1960. |
| Plimmerton | 24.4 km | 5.8m | 1885 | Open | |
| Pukerua Bay | 30.1 km | 80m | 1885 | Open | |
| Muri | 31.15 km | 77m | 1952 | 2011 | |
| Paekakariki | 38.84 km | 7m | 1886 | Open | |
| Wainui | 40.85 km | 9m | 1886 | 1900 | |
| Paraparaumu | 48.28 km | 13.7m | 1886 | Open | |
| Otaihanga | 51.5 km | 21m | 1886 | 1902 | |
| Waikanae | 55.31 km | 31m | 1886 | Open | |
| Hadfield | 60 km | 39m | 1886 | 1906 | |
| Te Horo | 64.77 km | 19.2m | 1886 | 1965 | |
| Hautere | 67.6 km | 15.2m | 1886 | 1900 | |
| Ōtaki | 70.28 km | 14.6m | 1886 | Open | |
| Manakau | 79.3 km | 30.5m | 1886 | 1982 | Known as "Manukau" until 1905. |
| Ohau | 84.95 km | 30.7m | 1886 | 1982 | |
| Levin | 90.3 km | 36.5m | 1886 | Open | Known as "Weraroa" 1886–1894. |
| Queen Street | 91.37 km | 36.5m | 1956 | 1977 | |
| Levin | 91.5 km | 36.5m | 1886 | 1894 | |
| Koputaroa | 99.23 km | 8.5m | 1886 | 1986 | Kereru until 1906. |
| Shannon | 106.57 km | 12.2m | 1886 | Open | |
| Makerua | 111.84 km | 7.62m | 1886 | 1966 | |
| Tokomaru | 118.35 km | 17.7m | 1885 | 1982 | crossing loop retained |
| Linton | 124.19 km | 18.3m | 1885 | 1972 | |
| Longburn | 129.69 km | 19.8m | 1873 | 1986 | |
| Awapuni | 132 km | 24.7m | 1876 | 1965 | |
| Palmerston North | 135.76 km | 30m | 1873 | 1965 | |
| Palmerston North | 136.03 km | 28m | 1963 | Open | |
| Terrace End | 138.51 km | 38.1m | 1876 | 1964 | |
| Bunnythorpe | 144.47 km | 55.2m | 1876 | 1985 | |
| Taonui | 148.62 km | 61.9m | 1876 | 1963 | |
| Aorangi | 150.66 km | 70.7m | 1876 | 1965 | |
| Feilding | 152.98 km | 72.2m | 1876 | 2012 | |
| Makino Road | 156.26 km | 103m | 1878 | 1960 | |
| Maewa | 158.34 km | 107m | 1878 | 1962 | |
| Halcombe | 165.76 km | 118m | 1878 | 1983 | |
| Kakariki | 171.12 km | 70m | 1879 | 1982 | |
| Greatford | 175.67 km | 104.5m | 1875 | 1983 | |
| Marton | 180.25 km | 140.8m | 1878 | 2012 | |
| Cliff Road | 183.58 km | 159.7m | 1888 | 1966 | |
| Overton | 188.85 km | 155m | 1888 | 1958 | |
| Porewa | 190.53 km | 165m | 1888 | 1982 | service siding retained |
| Rata | 195.46 km | 194m | 1888 | 1975 | |
| Silverhope | 199.31 km | 224m | 1888 | 1966 | |
| Hunterville | 205.33 km | 267m | 1888 | 1986 | |
| Kaikarangi | 210.18 km | 284m | 1888 | 1964 | |
| Mangaonoho | 216.04 km | 257m | 1893 | 1966 | |
| Ohingaiti | 222.14 km | 279m | 1902 | 1975 | |
| Mangaweka | 231.04 km | 326.7m | 1902 | 1982 | |
| Utiku | 243.69 km | 371m | 1904 | 1986 | |
| Ohotu | 247.08 km | 395.6m | 1904 | 1959 | |
| Winiata | 249.02 km | 415m | 1905 | 1972 | was siding |
| Taihape | 251.85 km | 442m | 1904 | 2012 | |
| Mataroa | 260.88 km | 530m | 1907 | 1986 | photo of opening day |
| Ngaurukehu | 270.25 km | 640m | 1908 | before 1993 | |
| Turangarere | 274.5 km | 702m | 1912 | 1972 | |
| Hīhītahi | 278.2 km | 741m | 1908 | 1982 | Turangarere until 1912. |
| Waiouru | 290.3 km | 813.8m | 1908 | 2005 | at 814m, highest railway station in New Zealand. |
| Tangiwai | 299.49 km | 699.5m | 1909 | 1986 | Nearest station to the Tangiwai disaster, 24 December 1953. |
| Karioi | 306.94 km | 630.3m | 1909 | 1984 | |
| Rangataua | 312.79 km | 670m | 1909 | 1986 | 1910s photo of station |
| Ohakune | 317.09 km | 618.4m | 1908 | Open | Ohakune Junction in working timetables 1917–1968. |
| Horopito | 326.91 km | 752m | 1909 | 1978 | Used as location for Smash Palace movie, 1981 |
| Pokaka | 332.57 km | 811m | 1909 | 1986 | 1924 photo of station |
| Erua | 340.13 km | 742.5m | 1908 | 1986 | 1920s photo of station |
| National Park | 346.83 km | 806.8m | 1908 | Open | Waimarino until 1949. |
| Raurimu | 358.31 km | 589m | 1906 | 1978 | Pukerimu 1906–1908 |
| Oio | 366.25 km | 520m | 1908 | 1972 | Known to WW2 American servicemen as "Zero-10". Shortest station name in New Zealand, with Ava & Tui . |
| Owhango | 371.89 km | 456.6m | 1908 | 1985 | first closed 1983, then briefly reopened |
| Kakahi | 382 km | 266m | 1908 | 1978 | |
| Piriaka | 387.15 km | 230m | 1908 | 1987 | |
| Manunui | 391.9 km | 190.5m | 1908 | 1986 | |
| Matapuna | 394.8 km | 180m | 1908 | 1987 | |
| Taumarunui | 397.75 km | 171m | 1903 | open | Closed in 2012 to groups fewer than 10 people until 4 December 2022 |
| Taringamotu | 402 km | 172.5m | 1903 | 1971 | |
| Okahukura | 408.54 km | 178.3m | 1903 | 1978 | Okahukura Junction in working timetables 1933–2010. |
| Te Koura | 412.75 km | 182m | 1909 | 1975 | |
| Ongarue | 420.68 km | 192.6m | 1903 | 1986 | |
| Waione Siding | 426.86 km | 208m | 1921 | 1950 | |
| Waimiha | 434.39 km | 232m | 1903 | 1983 | |
| Poro-O-Tarao | 444.05 km | 339.2m | 1901 | 1979 | |
| Mangapehi | 449.47 km | 285.3m | 1901 | 1984 | Known as "Mangapeehi" station 1901–1920. |
| Kopaki | 454.35 km | 265m | 1901 | 1982 | Paratikana until 1920. |
| Puketutu | 461.83 km | 206m | 1889 | 1977 | briefly open in 1889, then Mokau until 1912. |
| Waiteti | 470.07 km | 135m | 1889 | 1987 | |
| Te Kuiti | 475.66 km | 54m | 1887 | 2012 | |
| Te Kumi | 478.56 km | 49.6m | 1887 | 1968 | |
| Hangatiki | 485.02 km | 39.9m | 1887 | 1982 | |
| Otorohanga | 494.41 km | 37m | 1887 | Open | Closed then reopened summer 2012 must pre-book in advance |
| Kiokio | 498.45 km | 35.4m | 1887 | 1973 | |
| Te Kawa | 506.88 km | 47.8m | 1887 | 1982 | |
| Te Mawhai | 513 km | 35.6m | 1887 | 1958 | Te Puhi until 1900 |
| Te Awamutu | 517.02 km | 50m | 1880 | 2005 | |
| Ngaroto | 519.92 km | 56m | 1880 | 1954 | |
| Lake Road | 522.26 km | 54m | 1880 | 1940 | |
| Ohaupo | 527.16 km | 52m | 1880 | 1982 | |
| Rukuhia | 533.59 km | 55m | 1880 | 1970 | |
| Hamilton | 542.52 km | 37.5m | 1877 | Open | Previously Hamilton Junction and Frankton Junction. |
| Te Rapa Racecourse | 547.50 km | 33.2m | 1920 | 1980 | |
| Rotokauri | 549.25 km | 33m | 1877, 2021 | 1970, now open | Not to be confused with Te Rapa Marshalling Yards (547 km from Wellington). Reopened as Rotokauri in 2021 for the Te Huia service. |
| Horotiu | 553.65 km | 23.7m | 1877 | 1975 | Pukete until 23 June 1907. Moved from 77 mi (124 km) to 76 mi (122 km) from Auckland in 1880 |
| Ngaruawahia | 559.16 km | 20.7m | 1877 | 1978 | Newcastle until 1878. |
| Taupiri | 566.56 km | 13.7m | 1877 | 1982 | |
| Huntly | 573.87 km | 14m | 1877, 2021 | 2005 | Reopened in 2021 for the Te Huia service |
| Kimihia | 578.45 km | 14m | 1877 | 1939 | |
| Ohinewai | 582.04 km | 10m | 1877 | 1978 | |
| Rangiriri | 588.11 km | 9m | 1877 | 1957 | |
| Te Kauwhata | 591.62 km | 12.2m | 1877 | 1984 | |
| Whangamarino | 598.34 km | 6.7m | 1877 | 1978 | |
| Amokura | 604.53 km | 7m | 1877 | 1980 | |
| Mercer | 609.16 km | 6.4m | 1877 | 1993 | |
| Pokeno | 613.96 km | 24m | 1877 | 1973 | |
| Whangarata | 617.90 km | 59.7m | 1877 | 1966 | a flag station |
| Tuakau | 621.41 km | 37m | 1875 | 1986 | rebuilt 1910 |
| Buckland | 625.6 km | 58m | 1875 | 1969 | |
| Pukekohe | 628.86 km | 60.65m | 1875 | open | |
| Paerata | 633.29 km | 45.1m | 1875 | 1982 | Paerata Junction from 1917. |
| Runciman | 638.37 km | 8m | 1875 | 1918 | |
| Drury | 640 km | 9m | 1875 | 1980 | |
| Opaheke | 642.9 km | 14.5m | 1875 | 1955 | Hunua 1877–1939. |
| Papakura | 647.02 km | 19.2m | 1875 | Open | |
| Tironui | 648.95 km | 15.5m | 1904 | 1980 | |
| Takanini | 650.64 km | 15.2m | 1875 | Open | |
| Te Mahia | 652.24 km | 14.9m | 1904 | Open | |
| Manurewa | 653.1 km | 17m | 1875 | Open | |
| Homai | 655.7 km | 30.78m | 1904 | Open | |
| Wiri | 657.6 km | 22.25m | 1913 | 2005 | |
| Puhinui | 658.92 km | 19.8m | 1904 | Open | |
| Papatoitoi | 659.63 km | 18.9m | 1875 | 1904 | |
| Papatoetoe | 660.42 km | 18m | 1875 | Open | |
| Middlemore | 662.28 km | 8.8m | 1947 | Open | |
| Mangere | 663.02 km | 10.66m | 1908 | 2011 | |
| Otahuhu | 664.15 km | 9.44m | 1875 | Open | |
| Westfield | 665.5 km | 7.6m | 1904 | 2017 | |
| Sylvia Park | 667.09 km | 7.6m | 1931 | Open | Relocated 1 km further north, 2007. |
| Panmure | 669.93 km | 17.7m | 1931 | Open | Relocated 200m north, 2007. |
| Tamaki | 671.28 km | 23.5m | 1930 | 1980 | |
| Glen Innes | 672.64 km | 22m | 1930 | Open | |
| Purewa | 675.4 km | 18m | 1930 | 1955 | |
| Meadowbank | 676.26 km | 12m | 1954 | Open | |
| Ōrākei | 677.44 km | 4.5m | 1930 | Open | |
| The Strand | 680.76 km | 2.7m | 1930 | Open | Was platform 7 of the 1930–2003 Auckland station. Terminus for the Northern Explorer long-distance service, the Te Huia service, and steam and other excursion services. |
| Waitematā | 681.82 km | 4m below sea level | 2003 | Open | |
| Te Waihorotiu | 682.70 km | 11m below sea level | 2026 | Open | Open for the new City Rail Link |
| Karanga-a-Hape | 683.75 km | 33m below sea level | 2026 | Open | Open for the new City Rail Link |
| Maungawhau | 684.98 km | 60m | 2026 | Open | Open for the new City Rail Link |

== Record runs ==
Record runs from Auckland to Wellington were the 1960 Moohan Rocket (train) of 11 hours 34 minutes in 1960, and the Standard railcar time of 9 hours 26 minutes (running time 8 hours 42 minutes) in 1967.

== Incidents ==
Crashes on the NIMT have included the Ongarue railway disaster in 1923, the Paraparaumu train wreck in 1936 and the Tangiwai disaster in 1953. The line has also been closed by other incidents, such as for 3 days in 1942 and a week in October 2025, due to slips.

== See also ==
- List of Auckland railway stations
- List of Wellington railway stations
- Hamilton-Auckland commuter rail proposals
- North Island Main Trunk (1995) - film

== Gallery ==
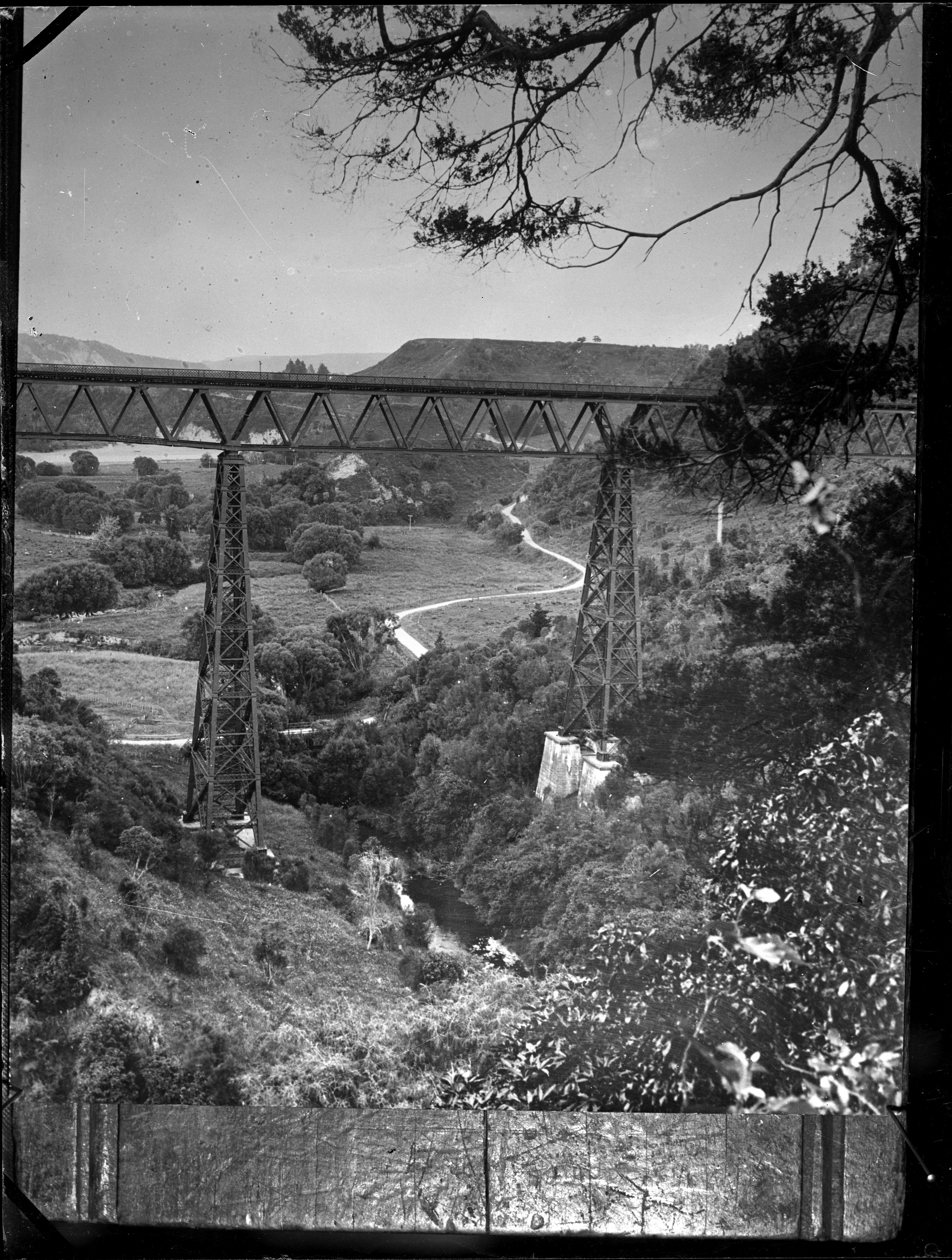
Makohine Viaduct 1930s

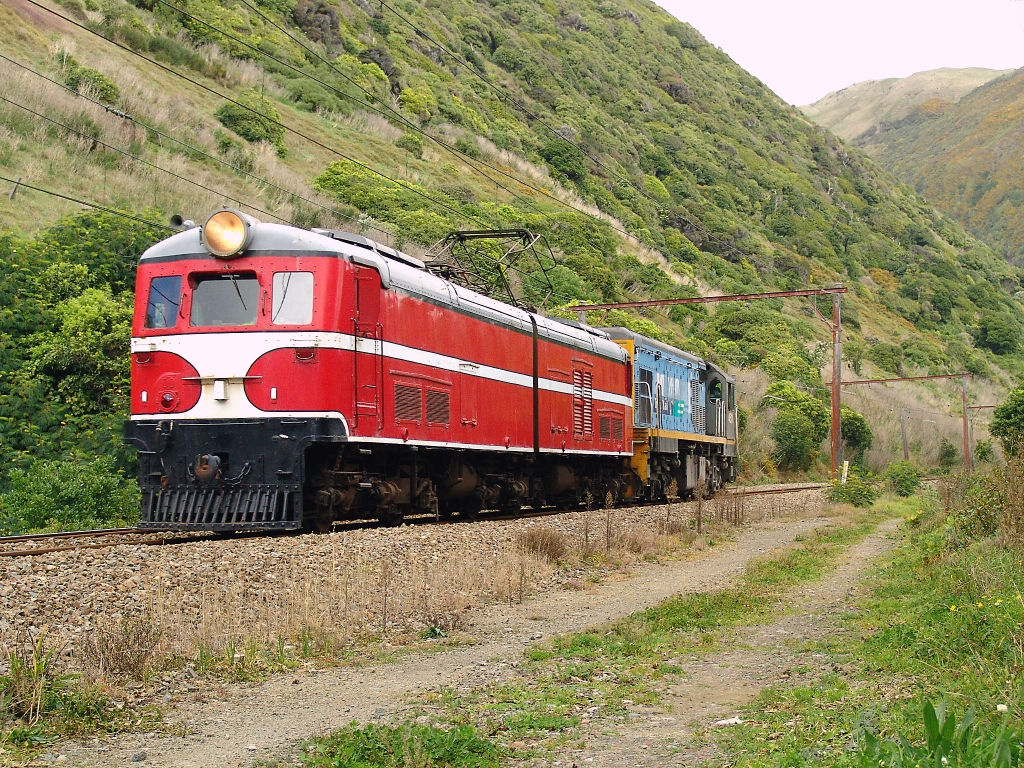
EW & DC locos near Paekākāriki 2005

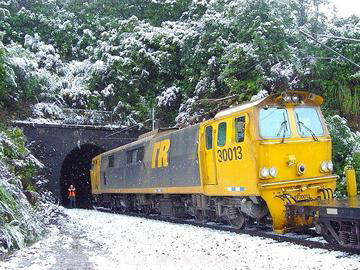
EF locomotive in "Bumble Bee" livery 2006

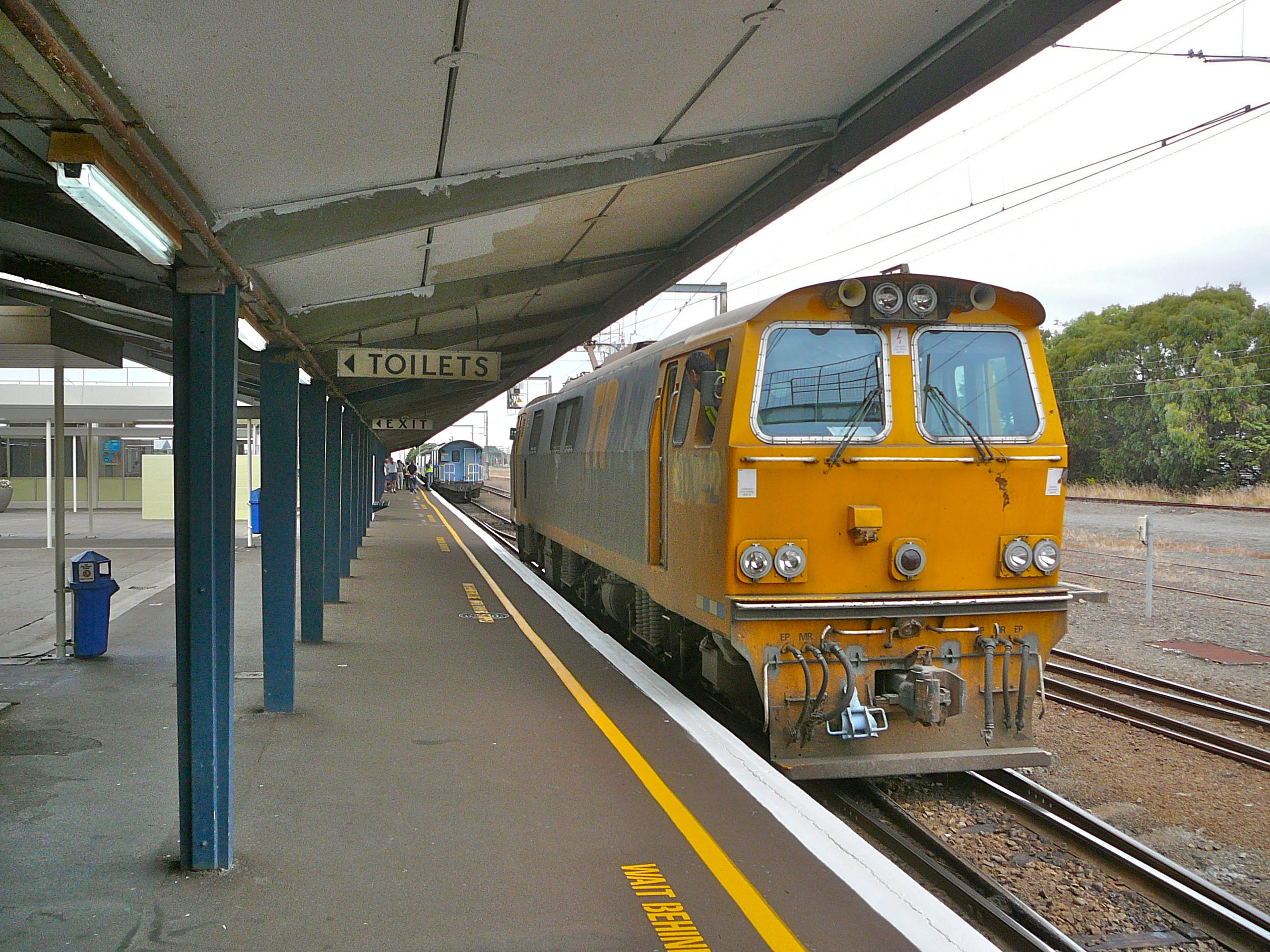
EF locomotive at Palmerston North 2007

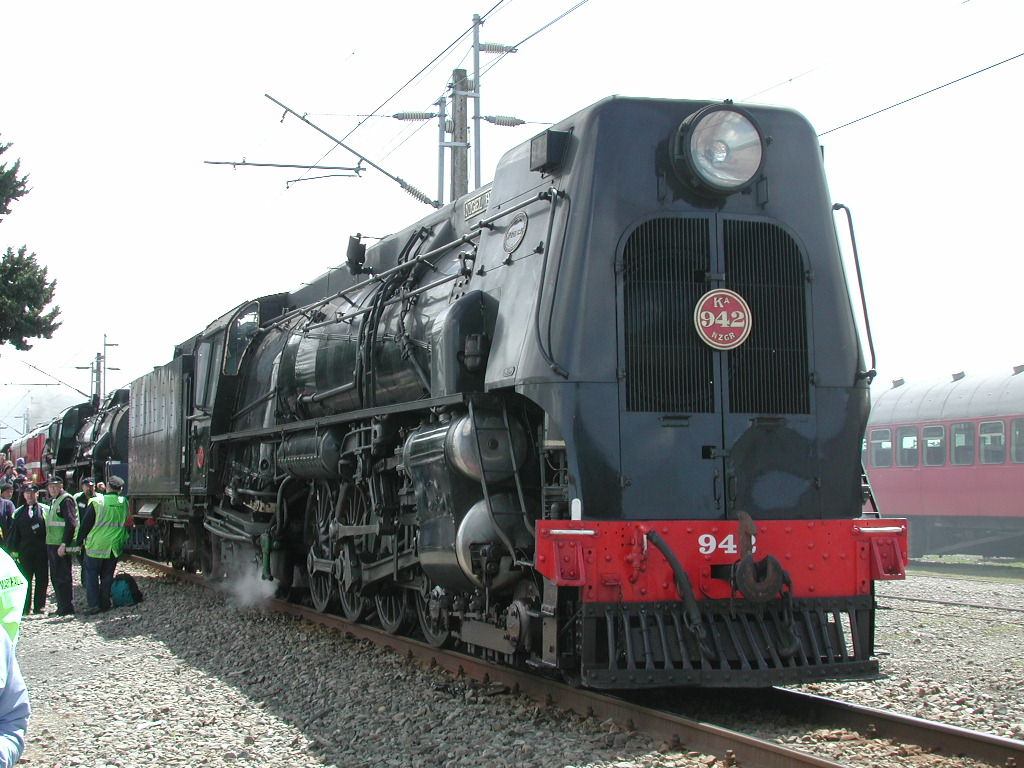
KA loco at NIMT centenary 2008

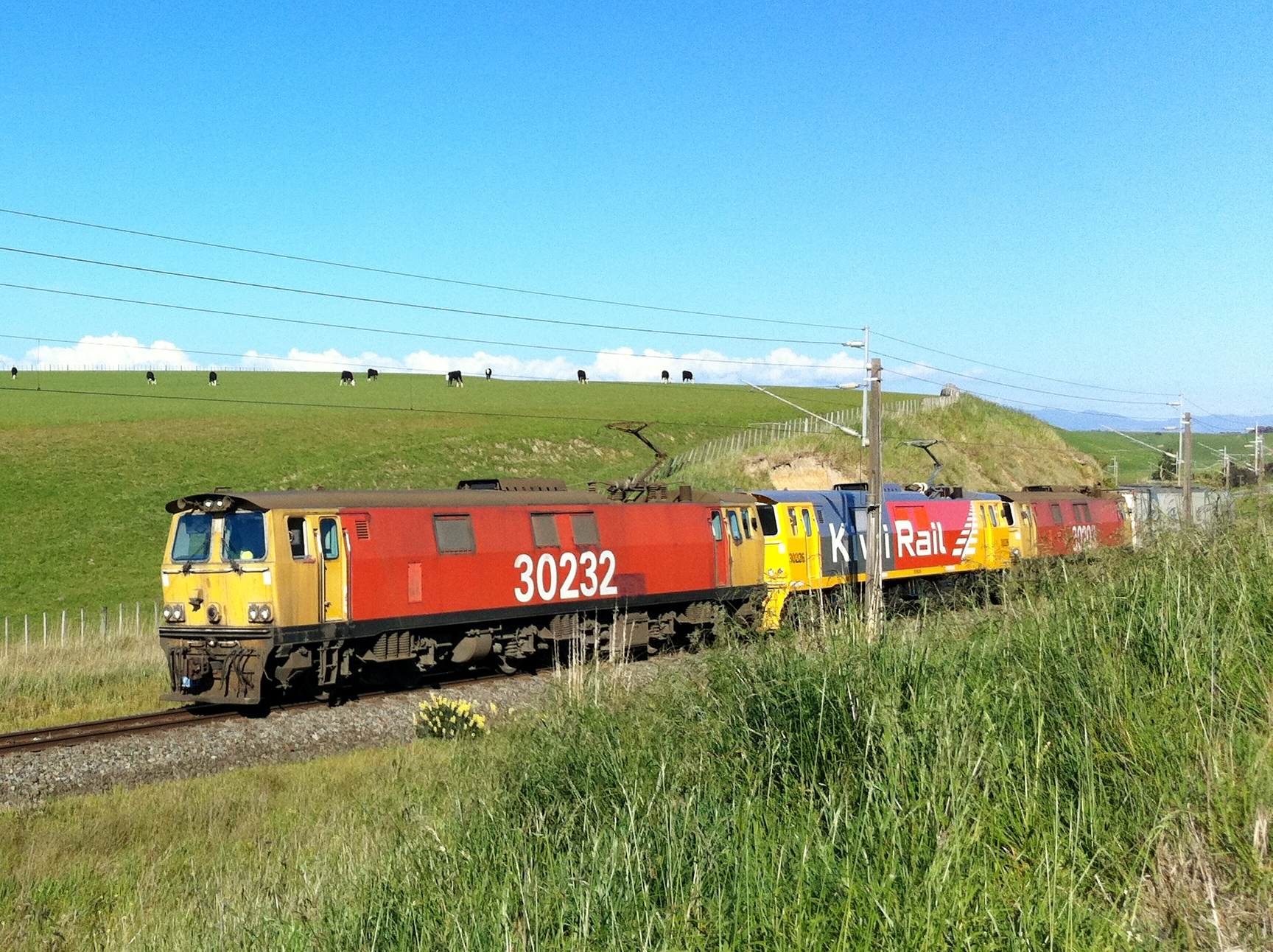
Freight train north of Fielding 2010
