= Kakahi railway station =

Railway station in New Zealand

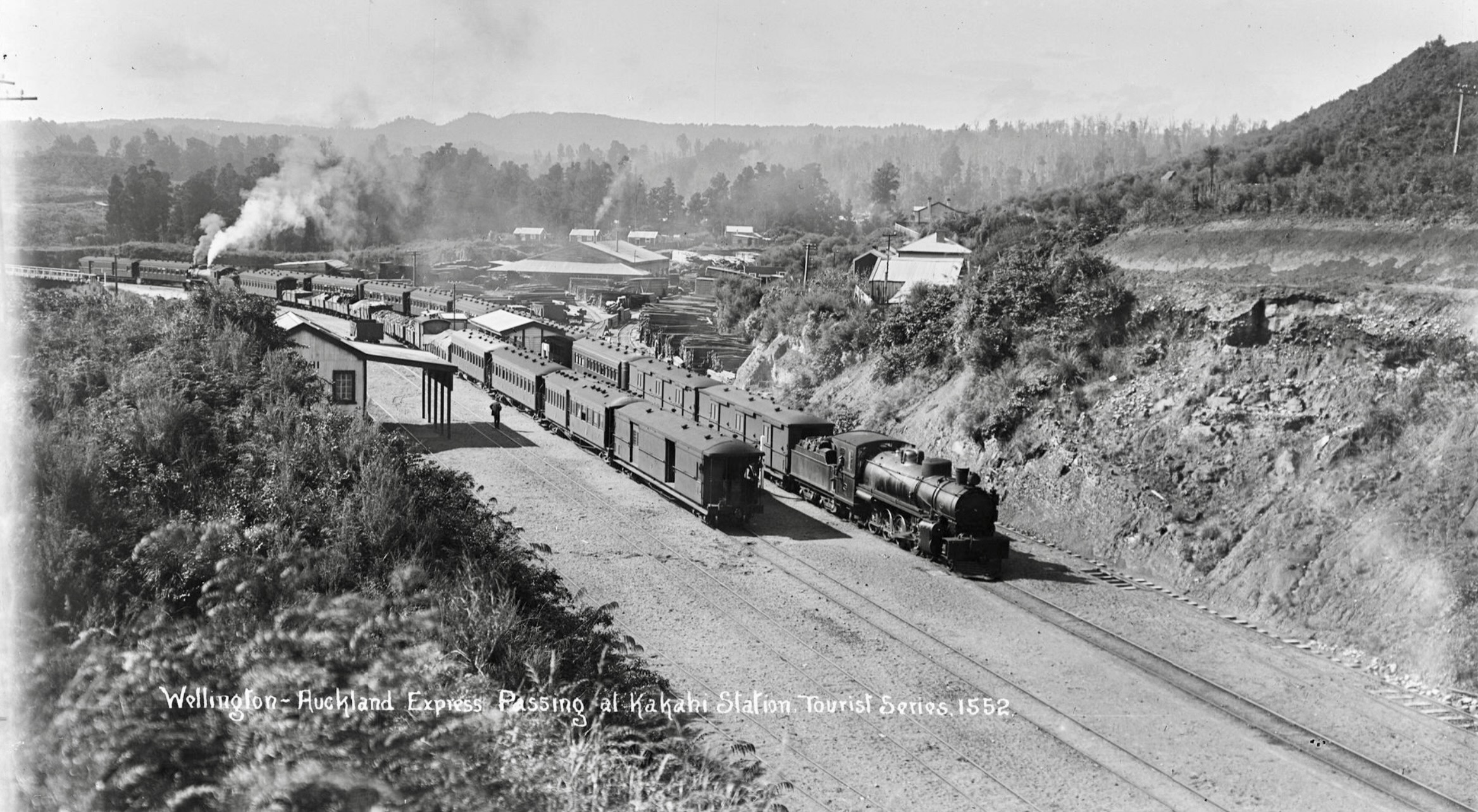
- Kakahi about 1910 with NZR X class

General information
- Location: New Zealand
- Coordinates: 38.938500°S 175.387200°E
- Elevation: 266 m (873 ft)
- Line: North Island Main Trunk
- Distance: Wellington 382 km (237 mi)

History
- Opened: 11 October 1904
- Closed: 25 June 1978
- Electrified: June 1988

Services
Preceding station	Historical railways	Following station
Piriaka; Line open, station closed 5.27 km (3.27 mi)	North Island Main Trunk; KiwiRail	Ōwhango; Line open, station closed 10.11 km (6.28 mi)
Location

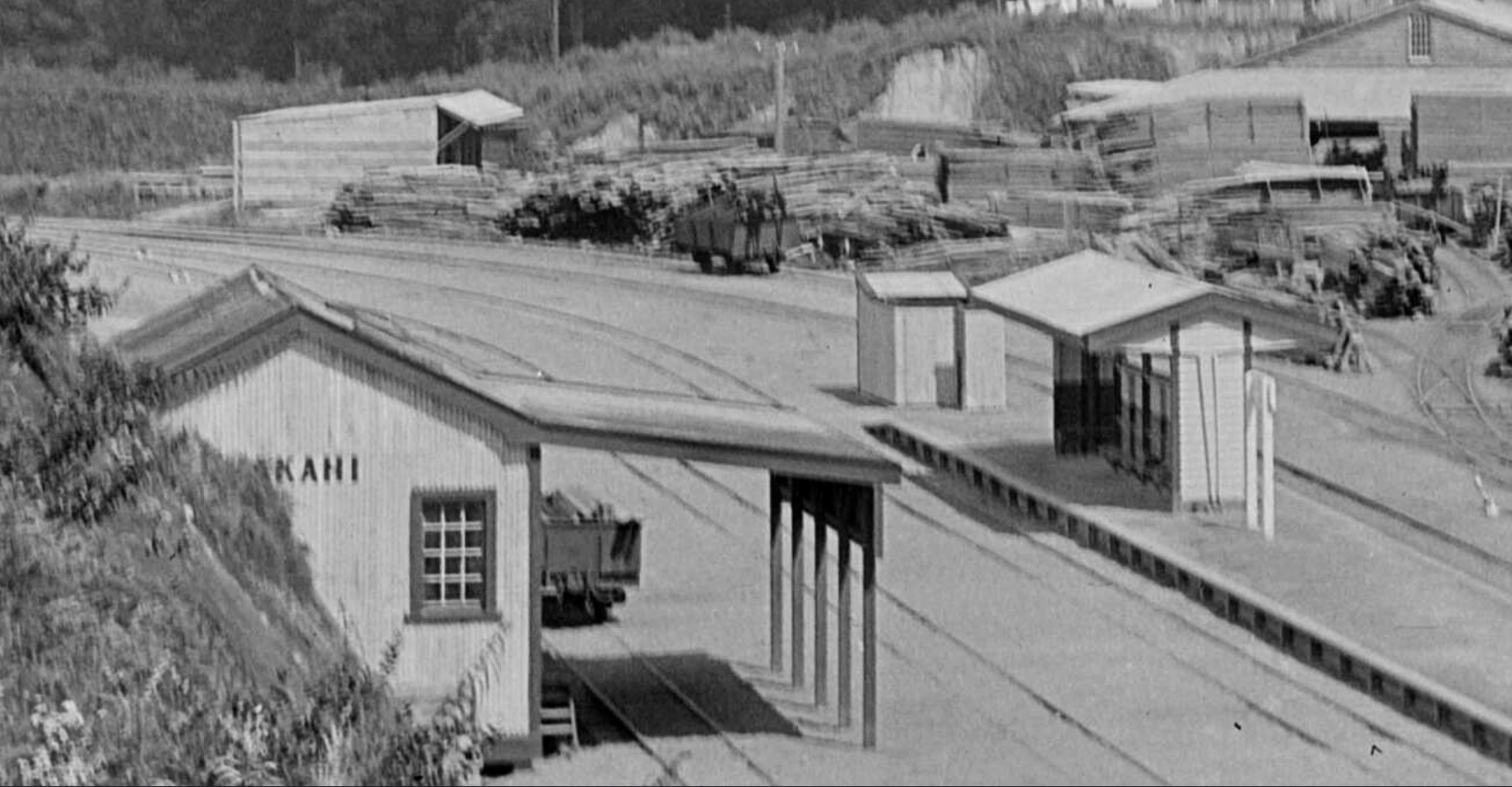
Kakahi station about 1915

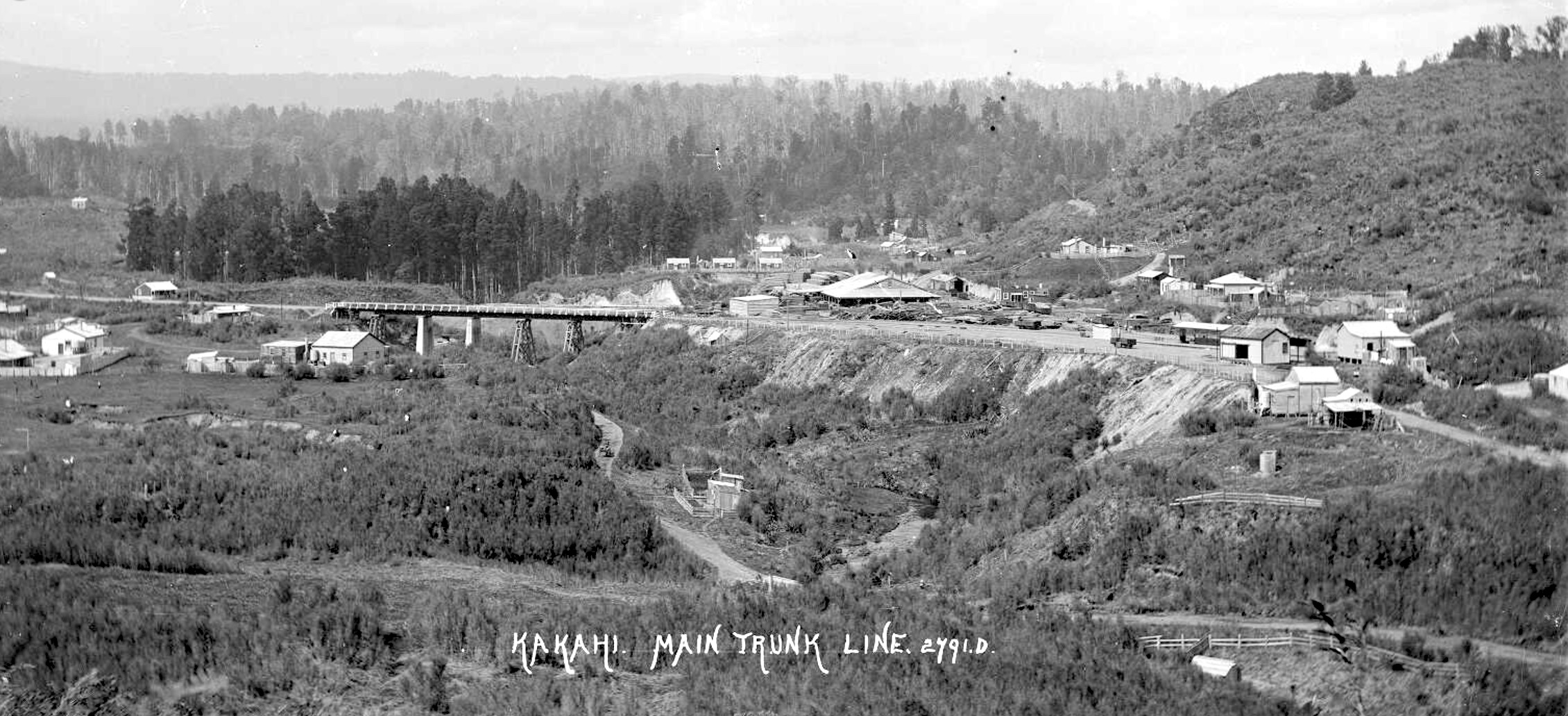
Kakahi 1908

Kakahi was a station on the North Island Main Trunk line, in the Ruapehu District of New Zealand, serving Kakahi. It formally opened on 9 November 1908. The rails were laid south of Piriaka by May 1904 and a daily ballast train was running by October, which also carried passengers. Kakahi Bridge has five spans of 44 ft (13 m) and one of 23 ft (7.0 m) supplied by G. Fraser & Sons of Auckland, which delayed construction to the south. It crosses the Kakahi Stream, which was sometimes called the Waitea River.

An island platform and shelter were built in 1907, extended to 22 ft (6.7 m) x 9 ft (2.7 m) in 1908, with a lobby, urinals and a storeroom, plus a 30 ft (9.1 m) x 20 ft (6.1 m) goods shed. A stockyard was added in 1912 and extended in 1945, but closed on 26 January 1971. The shelter was removed in 1958 and the building on 26 November 1966, though in 1968 a new 12 ft (3.7 m) x 8 ft (2.4 m) weatherboard, lean-to shelter was built for parcels and phones. The passing loop for 31 wagons was extended for 66 in 1937.

Electric block tablet signalling was installed in 1913, a new type of exchanger installed in 1965 and Centralised Traffic Control started on 15 May 1967.

An engine turning triangle was built in 1951/1952 south of the viaduct, but appears to have been disused by 1969.

On Sunday 25 June 1978 Kakahi closed to all traffic, though the loop remains in use.

== Incidents ==
From Piriaki, through Kakahi, to just south of Ōwhango, the line climbs a hill on the west side of the Whakapapa River, increasing to a maximum gradient of 1 in 50 on the Ōwhango bank. As early as 1906 groynes were added to protect the line from the river and a cutting collapsed. In 1908 it was noted that the hill was slipping, engines were derailed in 1915 1925 and 1959, trains were delayed in 1918, 1924, 1925, 1926, 1933, 1939, 1940 and 1945 and a length of railway was realigned in 1923. The 1933 disruption was long enough for an advert to refer to the 3/- charge for the bus replacement link.

== Sawmill ==
In November 1904 the Public Works Department set up a mill and a horse tramway to cut kahikatea, mataī, rimu and tōtara from 1,200 acres (490 ha), for sleepers, bridges, etc during the NIMT completion, cutting about 11,000 board feet (26 m^{3}), or superficial feet, a day. About 45 staff worked the mill. It was transferred from PWD to NZR on 30 July 1909 and £3000 was spent on improvements. Electric light was installed in 1912, but in 1914 the tramway was in a bad condition, in 1917 the sawmill was dismantled and in 1921 the sidings were removed. However, in 1955 a siding was provided for Kakahi Timber Co Ltd.

== See also ==
Taupo railway proposals - Kakahi-Pukawa line
