= Wainui railway station =

Defunct railway station in New Zealand

Coordinates: 40.969°S 174.985°E

Wainui

General information
- System: Wellington and Manawatu Railway Company (WMR)
- Owner: WMR
- Line: Wellington-Manawatu Line
- Platforms: Side
- Tracks: Main line (1)

History
- Opened: 1 December 1886
- Closed: 3 February 1902
Location

Wainui railway station was a flag station between Paekākāriki and Paraparaumu on the Wellington-Manawatu Line in New Zealand, when the line was run by the Wellington and Manawatu Railway Company. This line is now part of the Kāpiti section of the North Island Main Trunk.

The station was opened on 1 December 1886 and served the rural area between Paekākāriki and Paraparaumu. Contemporary newspaper reports state that the station was closed in November 1895, possibly because the land was in the way of a proposed new road.

Cassells states that the station closed on 3 February 1902. The platform was on the west side of the line according to Cassells, who shows a blind siding on the east side of the line with the south end joining the main line.

Hoy however says the station had no buildings or sidings, and was closed in 1900. He says it was north of McKay's Crossing near where a side road crosses the line and went into the hills. According to Hoy, the station apparently served a local Māori community, and closed when the community moved into Paekākāriki.
