= Piriaka railway station =

Railway station in New Zealand

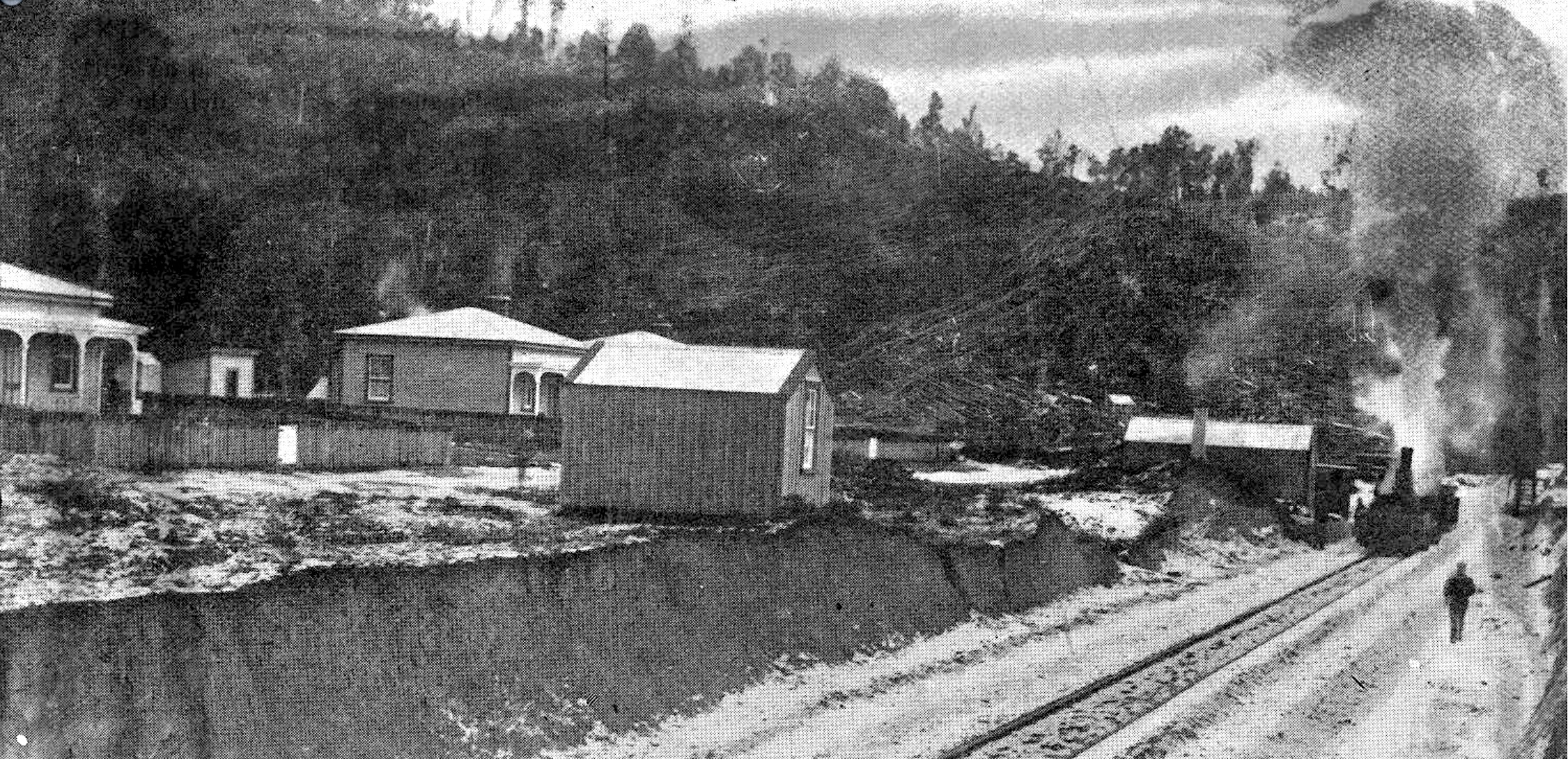
- Piriaka in 1906

General information
- Location: New Zealand
- Coordinates: 38.924200°S 175.341900°E
- Elevation: 230 m (750 ft)
- Line: North Island Main Trunk
- Distance: Wellington 387.27 km (240.64 mi)

History
- Opened: 11 October 1904
- Closed: 4 September 1972
- Electrified: June 1988
- Former names: Pirihaka

Services
Preceding station	Historical railways	Following station
Manunui; Line open, station closed	North Island Main Trunk; KiwiRail	Kakahi; Line open, station closed
Location

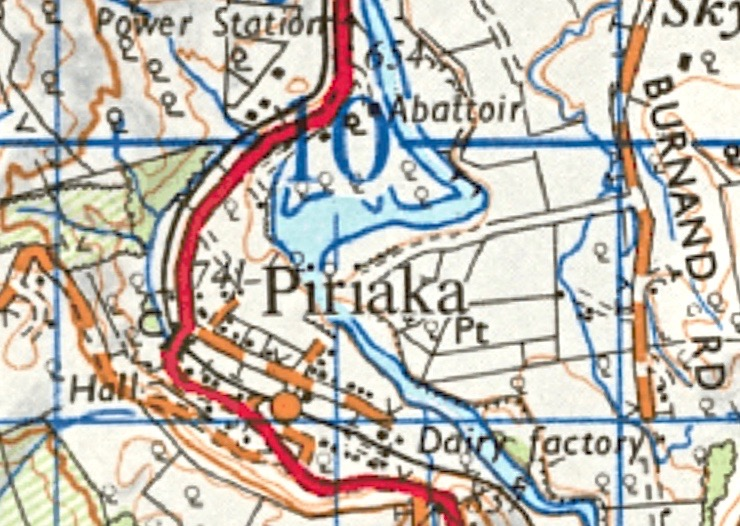
Piriaka on 1972 one inch map

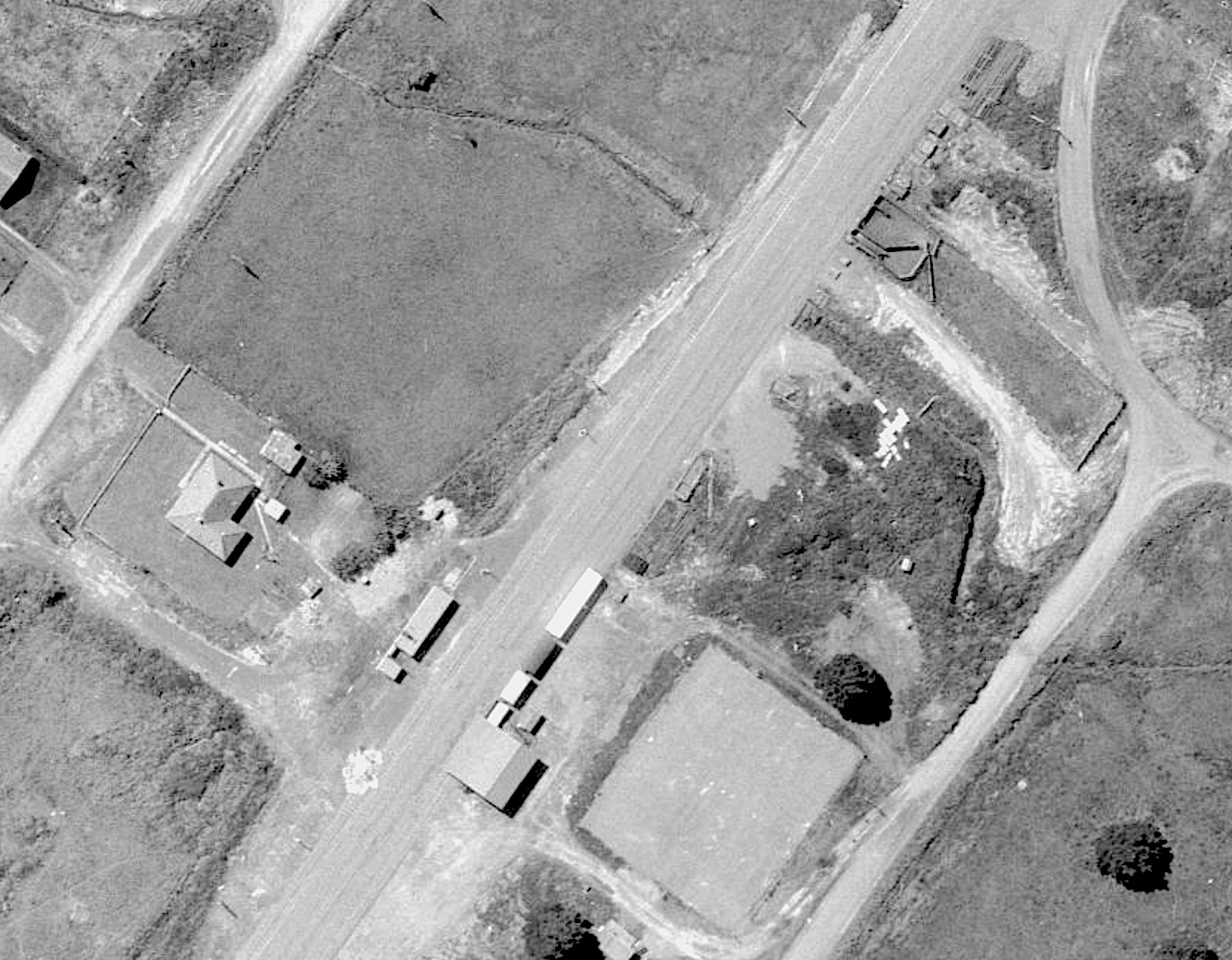
aerial photo of Piriaka in 1964

Piriaka was a station on the North Island Main Trunk line, in the Ruapehu District of New Zealand, serving Piriaka. It was 5.27 km (3.27 mi) north of Kakahi and 4.63 km (2.88 mi) south of Manunui. It formally opened on 9 November 1908, though it was renamed from Pirihaka on 25 April 1902 and work was well advanced by 1903, with the rails laid south of Piriaka by May 1904. Goods traffic started on 11 October 1904. By 10 November 1908 a passing loop could take 48 wagons and there was a 6th class station, with water supply, privies and urinals, a 300 ft (91 m) x 20 ft (6.1 m) passenger platform, loading bank, cattle yards and a 30 ft (9.1 m) x 20 ft (6.1 m) goods shed.

The level crossing, on what is now SH4, was replaced by a concrete bridge in 1937.

The railway delivered cream to Kaitieke butter factory, which opened at Piriaka in 1913 and produced over 400 tons of butter in 1923. By 1937 roads had improved, but the railway was still taking some supplies to the factory.
