= List of rail accidents in New Zealand =

This list is of railway crashes in New Zealand sorted chronologically.

Level crossing and trespasser crashes are not included unless the crash was investigated by the Transport Accident Investigation Commission (TAIC).

== 2020–present ==
- 3 November 2026: The last coal wagon of a goods train derailed near the Otira Tunnel on the Midland line, resulting in damage to the track and the cancellation of rail services in the area until at least the end of the month.
- 6 June 2026, Khandallah, Wellington – a Johnsonville line passenger train partially derailed after travelling through a red signal and diverting onto the runaway line, despite the emergency break being activated the train collided with a concrete block between Khandallah and Box Hill stations at 33 km/h. 6 people were injured and transported to hospital, 4 in a moderate condition and 2 in a serious condition including the driver. The Transport Accident Investigation Commission is investigating the collision.
- 15 October 2025, Waikanae, Wellington – a truck broke down on the Elizabeth Street level crossing and was hit by a northbound freight train. There were no injuries reported to either driver.
- 4 September 2024, Parnell, Auckland – two track workers received an electric shock and were hospitalised after the boom basket of the elevated work platform they were working in hit overhead power lines.
- 9 October 2023, St Johns, Auckland – a tamper machine derailed in the Purewa Tunnel. The tamper group were travelling to a work site when they entered the tunnel, however the rails had already been removed and the first tamper derailed. No injuries were reported.
- 17 June 2023, Penrose, Auckland – the Te Huia passenger train passed a red signal (SPAD – Signal Passed At Danger) at Penrose station and damaged points that had been set for an AT Metro train from a converging track. It stopped in the junction fouling zone, in danger of being hit side-on by the AT Metro train, which was authorised to occupy that section of track.
- 29 January 2023, Te Puke, Bay of Plenty – floodwaters washed away an embankment on the East Coast Main Trunk east of Te Puke. As a result, a loaded KiwiRail freight train derailed, including "at least 10" wagons and caused significant damage to the rail infrastructure.
- 10 January 2023, Te Puna, Bay of Plenty – two Hi-Rail vehicles were involved in a collision while undertaking track work. One vehicle occupant was injured and both vehicles were damaged.
- 7 December 2022, Whangārei, Northland – a shunt train collided with a heavy road vehicle at the Fertilizer Road level crossing. The train derailed and the truck's trailer was toppled. One train crew member was seriously injured.
- 1 June 2022, Tāmaki, Auckland – at 1:30 a.m., a shunting locomotive travelling from the Ports of Auckland to Westfield Junction with three crew members on board derailed, rolling onto its right side near the Tāmaki siding. The crew members escaped with minor injuries, and the crash closed the Eastern Line for a day.
- 13 December 2021, Marton, Manawatū–Whanganui – a freight train derailed north of Marton at 11:30 p.m. due to flooding of the line. Several wagons derailed and some overturned. No injuries were reported.
- 1 September 2021, Picton, Marlborough – a remote-controlled shunting locomotive and a wagon fell into the sea after running off the linkspan without a ferry present. No-one was on board at the time, but the linkspan sustained some damage.
- 17 August 2021, between Paekākāriki and Pukerua Bay, Wellington – a Kāpiti Line passenger train derailed due to a landslip covering the track. The carriages remained upright and all 82 passengers and three staff disembarked with no injuries.
- 19 July 2021, Pukekohe, Auckland – a Te Huia train experienced decoupling of carriages. Passengers disembarked at Pukekohe station and the service continued empty to Hamilton, where it experienced a second decoupling. No injuries were reported. A report by the Transport Accident Investigation Commission identified issues with KiwiRail's safety testing and training of train staff.
- 13 May 2021, Marton – a freight train collided with a utility truck at the Saunders Road level crossing at around 3:30 p.m. The truck caught fire as a result of the collision and the driver was killed. The line was closed for 4½ hours after the collision.
- 10 April 2021, on board ferry Aratere, Wellington Harbour – a worker was hit by a moving wagon during shunting operations, requiring hospitalisation.
- 11 January 2021, Invercargill, Southland – at 8:30 a.m. a coal train derailed at Wrights Bush, leaving seven wagons off the track. There were no injuries reported. The cause of the derailment is not yet known.
- 16 September 2020, Bunnythorpe, Manawatū–Whanganui – a Palmerston North to Feilding public bus collided with a light locomotive at the Clevely Line level crossing near Bunnythorpe. The driver of the bus died at the scene and several passengers suffered minor injuries. The infrequency of the train and bus encountering each other (the train was running 15 minutes early and the bus several minutes late) and the driver concentrating on turning right off Railway Road into Clevely Line and failing to notice the crossing alarms were the likely causes of the crash.
- 24 April 2020, between Milton and Henley, Otago – express freight Train 132 collided with a hi-rail vehicle near the Limeworks Road level crossing. The hi-rail driver was able to jump clear before impact. The vehicle suffered major damage, with minor damage to the freight train. No injuries reported.
- 10 February 2020, Flaxton, Canterbury – a Coastal Pacific train carrying 95 passengers collided with a truck at the Mulcocks Road level crossing, resulting in the death of the truck driver.

== 2010–2019 ==
- 7 December 2019, Morrinsville, Waikato – a freight train collided with a car at the Piako Road level crossing, resulting in the death of the car's two occupants. An investigation found that the car driver was likely confused by unauthorised roadworks in the area.
- 2 July 2019, Wellington, Wellington – the ninth wagon of express freight Train 268 derailed near Wellington station, resulting in a 21-hour long suspension of passenger services in and out of the station.
- 4 April 2019, Milson, Manawatū–Whanganui – express freight Train 626, pulling 37 wagons loaded with logs, derailed at a set of points. There were no injuries. Closure of the North Island Main Trunk line caused significant disruption to rail freight traffic.
- 29 March 2019, Clinton, Otago – Three rear wagons of a freight train derailed on a crossing loop at Clinton. Excessive speed and driver distraction were found to be the main causes of the crash.
- 9 May 2018, Britomart, Auckland – The front three cars of an inbound train derailed in the Britomart tunnel on the approach to the platforms and stopped millimetres from a concrete wall. The emergency brakes were activated and no injuries were recorded. The derailed AM class units took several days to clear. The TAIC investigation found that a manufacturing defect in a rail caused the rail to fracture.
- 20 October 2017, Masterton, Wairarapa – A passenger train collided with the trailer of a logging truck. The collision scattered logs across the road, but no injuries were reported.
- 6 October 2017, Kawerau, Bay of Plenty – an empty log train collided with a rubbish truck at the Lambert Road level crossing, causing the truck to overturn. The truck driver was fatally injured after being thrown from the vehicle. An investigation found that the truck driver did not stop at the stop sign controlling the level crossing.
- 27 May 2014, Melling, Lower Hutt – While operating a Wellington to Melling commuter service, "Matangi" FP/FT 4472 overshot Melling station and collided with the stop block and overhead traction pole at the end of the line. Two passengers were hospitalised for minor injuries and shock. This incident should not be confused with the almost identical incident at the same station on 15 April 2013 (below).
- 2 March 2014, Otahuhu, Auckland – An empty southbound passenger train returning to Westfield Depot derailed near Westfield Junction just before 2am. The DC locomotive and first SA carriage left the track, with the locomotive coming to rest on its side and the carriage remaining upright. The driver and train manager sustained minor injuries. The TAIC investigation identified two safety issues.
- 27 February 2014, Rangiriri, Waikato – The southbound Northern Explorer travelling from Auckland to Wellington with 108 passengers on board collided with an articulated truck at the level crossing on Te Onetea Road. The 28-year-old driver of the truck died at the scene. The TAIC investigation found two safety issues contributing to the crash.
- 3 September 2013, Mercer, Waikato – A northbound freight train derailed, leaving one wagon lying across the tracks, and two wagons blocking the Waikato Expressway (State Highway 1), causing significant traffic delays. It was found that a failed wheel bearing on the 20th wagon caused the derailment.
- 20 May 2013, Kaiwharawhara, Wellington – The rear car of a morning southbound commuter train derailed just south of Kaiwharawhara station. Split pins had not been fitted to bolts on a spring park brake cylinder when the train was serviced ten weeks earlier; the cylinder came off the car and jackknifed the nearby air reservoir tanks, pushing the car off the rails and punching a hole in the carriage floor. Four passengers suffered minor injuries.
- 15 April 2013, Melling, Lower Hutt – at approximately 7.54 a.m., the two-car "Matangi" FP/FT 4149 failed to stop and collided with the stop block at Melling station at a speed of approximately 25 km/h. Nine passengers and two crew were on board. The KiwiRail investigation determined that driver error was the cause. This incident should not be confused with the almost identical incident at the same station on 27 May 2014 (above).
- 9 January 2013, Glenbrook, Auckland – a freight train carrying steel from the Glenbrook Steel Mill, consisting of three locomotives and 36 wagons, derailed on the Mission Bush Branch near Glenbrook due to a wrongly configured brake control system.
- 18 March 2012, Halcombe, Manawatū–Whanganui - A freight train collided with a tractor on a private farm crossing. The 18-year-old tractor driver was helicoptered to Palmerston North hospital in a critical condition, but survived the crash.
- 31 October 2011, Paekākāriki, Wellington – A 12.6-metre-long three-axle low-floor bus became stuck on the Beach Road level crossing waiting at a stop sign to turn right onto State Highway 1, and was hit by a southbound freight train. No injuries were reported. The crash was caused by the bus stopping in a position where its single driving axle was off the ground above a drain, combined with an insufficient 'stacking distance' between the level crossing and State Highway 1, meaning any vehicle over 10 metres long could not stop without encroaching either the railway line or the State Highway.
- 1 February 2011, Ngaio, Wellington – At about 1 p.m. a Johnsonville bound suburban multiple electric unit derailed at the passing loop switch when leaving Ngaio station and ran off through a barrier fence, stopping about a metre into the station carpark. Although no one was injured, about 16 passengers were kept on board the train for around 20 minutes until the overhead electricity could be turned off, so they could disembark and continue on their journey by replacement bus. Services were replaced by buses for the afternoon but were restored by 7 p.m. A crane was used to rerail the train. KiwiRail intended to investigate the cause of the derailment.
- 12 January 2011, Stratford, Taranaki – About 9:15 a.m. a New Plymouth bound freight train collided with a utility vehicle at Flint Road Level crossing, which was controlled only by stop signs, killing one person and seriously injuring two others in the vehicle. This was the fifth crash, and second fatality, at this crossing since 1992. Local residents considered the crossing was a crash waiting to happen because it was close to the highway, had limited visibility and many drivers did not stop for the crossing. They felt that barrier arms were needed. At the time of the crash, KiwiRail had been intending to install flashing lights at the crossing within the next two years, as it was high on the priority list to be upgraded.
- 30 September 2010, Plimmerton, Wellington – At about 3:15 p.m. a northbound Wellington to Paraparaumu electric multiple unit hit a landslide on the line north of Plimmerton and derailed into the path of a southbound Paraparaumu to Wellington multiple unit; two injured. The drivers of the multiple units, who happened to be father and son, both survived by flinging themselves from their respective driving compartments moments before impact. The two heavily damaged components of the Ganz-Mavag units were withdrawn from service and the undamaged components marshalled together as a new set. The TAIC investigation found that no special track inspections were made and no speed restrictions were put in place despite rainfall well above average and a site at high risk of landslide.

== 2000–2009 ==
- 23 July 2009, Maymorn, Wellington – The locomotive and first carriage of an evening northbound Wairarapa Connection derailed after hitting a mudslide at the exit to the Maoribank Tunnel; no injuries were reported, but the line was blocked for three days.
- 1 July 2009, Newmarket, Auckland – an elderly vision-impaired passenger died after falling between a passenger train and the platform at Newmarket West station.
- between 21 June 2008 and 7 May 2009, North Island Main Trunk – Three freight trains derailed in separate incidents caused by the failure and collapse of bogie side frames on wagons.
- 12 June 2008, Bryndwr, Canterbury – Two freighthopping men riding on top of a southbound Main North Line freight train were knocked off after hitting an overhead footbridge and were killed.
- 6 May 2005 Nūhaka, Hawke's Bay – part of a train (a 60-tonne crane and two wagons) repairing the bridge fell into the Nūhaka River on the Palmerston North-Gisborne Line, when Bridge 256 collapsed beneath it due to boring by teredo worms. No one was injured. Axle load limits on the line were 16.3 tonnes, but the crane weighed up to 24.1 tonnes. Due to sales of lighter cranes, following privatisation, no other was available for the job. The report also mentioned an engineering manager's opinion that the standard and frequency of ageing timber bridge inspections had fallen below desirable levels and that there were insufficient engineering staff. The bridge was reopened in July 2005.
- 1 April 2003, Silverstream, Upper Hutt – an Upper Hutt to Wellington Express electric multiple unit fatally struck a pedestrian at the Silverstream station crossing, despite warning devices operating. The coroner found that pedestrians often ignore warning devices at this crossing and recommended that gates be installed to prevent pedestrians accidentally walking onto tracks. The first gated pedestrian railway crossing was subsequently installed at Silverstream, and served as a prototype for other busy pedestrian crossings.
- 26 July 2002, Te Wera, Taranaki – Express freight train 533 bound for New Plymouth headed by DX 5045 and DC 4657 crashed after speeding when the crew had fallen asleep at around 2-3am. The train (with sleeping crew) took a curve with a 45 km/h speed restriction at around 70 km/h, and derailed, rolling down a 12 metre bank. The driver, Timothy Steffert, was crushed and died of his injuries, while the fellow operator in the cab, Daniel Brown, survived, albeit with serious leg and chest injuries. An investigation concluded that Steffert was over the legal limit of alcohol for driving at the time, and that both crew had been suffering from sleep deprivation. DX 5045 was rebuilt as DX 5520, and DC 4657 was scrapped due to its damage.
- 12 June 2002, Silverstream, Upper Hutt – A partially-sighted passenger suffered an undisplaced leg fracture when she fell onto track ballast from the rear door of a four-car suburban Electric Multiple Unit that had been positioned too short on the platform, with the rear doors off the platform. Although the passenger was able to walk away at the time, she was hospitalised six days later when the fracture displaced. Several other stopping short incidents occurred about the same time, although without injuries. After investigating this, and other similar incidents, train operator Tranz Metro revised instructions to staff about positioning its trains on platforms and upgraded platform markings to make them more obvious to train drivers.
- 8 January 2001, Makikihi, Canterbury – The Southerner passenger train was involved in a level crossing crash with a cattle truck. The DC-class locomotive and two of three passenger carriages were derailed, injuring 21 passengers and forcing the destruction of 10 cattle-beasts.
- 8 December 2000, Christchurch, Canterbury – Two freight trains collided in Middleton Yard after an inbound train failed to heed a danger signal and collided with an outbound train. One engineer suffered a broken finger.

== 1990–1999 ==
- 20 October 1999, Waipahi, Otago – A northbound Main South Line express freight train collided with a stationary southbound freight train after a misunderstanding of track warrant conditions by both train drivers; one killed, one seriously injured. One of the locomotives involved (DC 4202) was written off and scrapped.
- 21 October 1998, Rangiora, Canterbury – The northbound Coastal Pacific was unexpectedly diverted into the loop at Rangiora and collided with the rear end of the No. 2 shunt, which was stabled there awaiting the Coastal Pacific to overtake it. The accident occurred due to the points logic circuits reacting to an unusual shunting movement carried out by the No. 2 shunt earlier and the fact that the locomotive engineer of the Coastal Pacific had his attention diverted looking for passengers on the Rangiora station platform to determine whether or not he would be required to stop at the station. One passenger suffered a broken nose and some members of the train crew sustained minor injuries. The Transport Accident Investigation Commission (TAIC) made five safety recommendations as a result of the incident.
- 14 March 1998, Ngāruawāhia, Waikato – An unsecured load on train hit a bridge while crossing the Waikato River. Six wagons were derailed with another five severely damaging the bridge. The cause was the movement of inadequately restrained stacked platform containers. The TAIC identified three issues: the serviceability and uniformity of integral interlocking devices fitted to platform containers; the standards for transporting stacked platform containers internationally; and the understanding of and compliance with requirements for transporting stacked platform containers by rail. The TAIC made three safety recommendations.
- 18 June 1997, Glen Innes, Auckland – At about 11:50 a.m. an empty Silver Fern railcar returning to its depot and travelling at 80 km/h fatally collided with a pedestrian who had just disembarked from a suburban train travelling in the opposite direction Glen Innes. The collision occurred at a pedestrian level crossing without warning devices. The coroner found that the pedestrian was unable to see or hear the railcar, due to the weather and noisy environment, and directed that warning devices be installed at the crossing, as a minimum. The report also stated that train drivers have a duty of care to pedestrians, despite having right of way, and recommended that trains slow down near the station.
- 14 November 1996 at Hilderthorpe, North Otago the Southerner collided with a truck on a level crossing, leaving four dead.
- 12 November 1995, Pukehou, Hawke's Bay – the northbound Bay Express express passenger service between Wellington and Napier, derailed at Pukehou between Waipukurau and Hastings on the Palmerston North–Gisborne Line. The train was traveling at approximately 90 km/h when the locomotive, power/baggage van and an empty passenger carriage left the tracks on a right hand curve. The two rear carriages carrying passengers remained on the rails. A member of the public riding in the cab of the locomotive was fatally injured and nineteen passengers or crew suffered shock or minor injuries. The causal factor was found to be the excessive speed of the train.
- 25 August 1993, Rolleston, Canterbury – The driver of a concrete mixer truck turning right off State Highway 1 failed to notice the level crossing alarms on the George Holmes Road level crossing and collided with the side of the locomotive of a southbound Southerner passenger express train. The truck's mixer bowl bounced off the carriages, ripping two of them open. Three passengers were killed (including Louise Cairns, younger sister of New Zealand Cricket legend, Chris Cairns), seven others were seriously injured.
- 7 August 1991, Oio, Manawatū–Whanganui – Locomotive engineer Graeme Orange was killed and two 4000 hp EF class electric locomotives (EF30036 and 30088) were subsequently written off after striking a washout.

== 1980–1989 ==
- 12 December 1989 – Ward, Marlborough. A southbound Coastal Pacific Express passenger train derailed while attempting to avoid an articulated truck that had come to rest on the tracks following a car versus truck collision on the adjacent State Highway 1.
- 7 August 1984, Edendale, Southland – An Invercargill to Balclutha shunt derailed after a section of track was washed out. One person was killed.
- 18 August 1981, Waiouru, Manawatū-Whanganui – A Silver Fern railcar derailed on a curve and fell 8 m down a bank due to a missing speed restriction sign. Four people were killed and 16 injured.
- 19 November 1980 between Pukerua Bay and Paekākāriki – A southbound EMU train derailed after running into a slip, north of Bean Pole Fence.
- 21 May 1980, Otira, West Coast – An eastbound coal train derailed after a 50-metre section of track was washed away during stormy weather. Driver Owen Fitzgerald was trapped in the cab of his locomotive and subsequently drowned.
- 24 March 1980, Wellington, Wellington – During the morning peak period a Porirua to Wellington suburban multiple unit that was signalled to enter Wellington station crashed head-on into a diesel shunter with six empty carriages from a Wairarapa train leaving the station that had somehow strayed onto the wrong line. Two people were killed and at least 77 injured. Extensive testing found no fault with the signal system. The driver of the shunt locomotive was found not guilty of manslaughter for failing to stop for a red signal (SPAD). The driver of the shunter passed what he perceived (in error) to be a yellow low-speed light; however the route selected for the shunter to the east car yards was not the usual route.

== 1970–1979 ==
- 30 November 1979 - Buller Gorge, West Coast – A Westport-bound locomotive was derailed by a slip on the Stillwater–Westport line.
- October 1979, Muri, Wellington – Signal 3132 at Muri was over-run by a diesel-hauled goods train (diesel locos was not fitted with trips) and was involved in a minor rear-end collision with an EMU commuter train; one of two commuter trains ahead.
- 17 October 1979, Thorndon, Wellington – A Porirua to Wellington suburban train (a New Zealand DM class electric multiple unit) rear-ended a stationary Taitā to Wellington suburban unit, in the Thorndon yards, about 1 km (0.6 mi) short of Wellington station. At least 44 people were injured, five seriously. The experienced driver failed to recognise the meaning of the signal; a yellow low-speed light (Heine gives the date of the crash as 17 March 1979).
- 19 March 1979, Matapihi, Bay of Plenty – A freight train went into a washout. One locomotive (D^{A} 1436) was written off. The second locomotive D^{B}1014 was rebuilt into DBR1200.
- 25 May 1978, Pukerua Bay, Wellington – D^{A} 1470, returning to Wellington light engine from Paekākāriki, derailed on a curve due to excessive speed and almost fell onto State Highway 1 below the line. Two people were killed.
- 23 March 1977, Newmarket, Auckland – At around 4:00 p.m. a Wellington-to-Auckland freight train collided with an Auckland-to-Helensville suburban train near the Parnell Tunnel during a widespread signal system power failure after the passenger train failed to stop at a hand-signalled junction and continued running on the wrong line. The driver of the passenger train was killed and both locomotives (D^{X} 2639 and D^{A} 1426) were written off.
- 21 November 1975, Feilding, Manawatū–Whanganui – Silver Fern derailed in a level-crossing accident. at Feilding.
- 24 August 1975, Eketāhuna, Manawatū–Whanganui – RM 132 caught fire after debris collected in the inter-carriage bellows. The locomotive was written off and scrapped.
- 20 September 1972, Wellington – The brakes failed on an electric locomotive hauling a nine car commuter train from Taita arriving on platform 4 at Wellington railway station. The locomotive overran the end buffers and jumped up and hit the announcer's box. Three passengers were injured, with one hospitalised. The cause of the crash was later determined to be a brake line tap being turned off when its handle was accidentally struck by a carriage as the train negotiated the tight turnouts while entering the platform. The tap handles were modified on all affected carriages to prevent a repeat occurrence.
- 15 February 1971, Dashwood, Marlborough – A Picton to Christchurch railcar collided with a cattle truck on a level crossing. One person was killed.

== 1960–1969 ==
- 23 March 1967, Whakaki, Hawke's Bay – a Gisborne-Napier freight train and railcar crashed head on, injuring 16 passengers, probably due to the drivers of the D^{A} falling asleep.
- 19 May 1966, Dashwood Pass, Marlborough – a Christchurch to Picton mixed train (popularly named the "Cabbage Train") derailed at the southern portal of Tunnel 22, after the driver took a curve at twice the speed restriction. One person was killed and two seriously injured.
- 3 November 1962, Te Kauwhata, Waikato – a northbound freight train ran a red signal and crashed into the back of a stationary freight train after the driver of the first train fell asleep at the controls. One driver was killed. This crash sparked the introduction of vigilance devices in diesel locomotives.
- 19 September 1961, between Pukerua Bay and Paekakariki, Wellington – an EW electric locomotive hauling a freight train on the North–South Junction was derailed by a fall of rock over the abandoned No 12 tunnel, just after the passing of the Auckland express. EW 1806 was nearly pushed over the bank to the road below, and was subsequently given an "A" grade overhaul.

== 1950–1959 ==
- 5 February 1958, Pinedale, Waikato – A Rotorua to Frankton, Hamilton freight train derailed on a curve after an air leak led to brake failure while the train was descending a 2% (1 in 50) grade. One person was killed and one injured.
- 21 October 1957, Wellington – A Plimmerton-to-Wellington suburban unit rear-ended an Upper Hutt-to-Wellington suburban unit on the approach to Wellington station. 23 people were injured.
- 23 May 1957, Omihi, Canterbury – A rail car hit a car on a private crossing on the Inkson farm resulting in the death of Joseph and Sheila Inkson.
- 19 February 1957 – Palmerston North, Manawatū–Whanganui. A train reversed and a wagon was derailed resulting in a crush injury and later death of shunter Robert Newton Smith.
- 17 January 1956, between National Park and Raurimu, Manawatū–Whanganui – Locomotive Jb1229 returning after banking No.227 express to National Park, derailed on a curve before entering the Raurimu Spiral. The driver and fireman required hospital treatment for burns, abrasions and shock. Excessive speed was a likely cause, but the speedometer had been removed for repairs before the accident.
- 26 October 1955, Waipuku, Taranaki – Railcar RM30 Aotea, travelling from Wellington to New Plymouth struck a Ford Prefect car on a private level crossing which gave access to several NZR staff houses, killing three people. The driver Robert Reid (50y), his wife Moera (26y) and Arnold Cantwell were returning from the cinema at 11.09 p.m., and the railcar was travelling at about 40 mph. The private crossing had poor visibility, and the car driver did not appear to hear the railcar horn. Reid (ganger) and Cantwell (traffic assistant) were both NZR employees.
- 3 August 1955 – between Lyttelton and Linwood, Canterbury – Derailing of trucks used as buffers to push coal wagons up the ramp to the steam engine fuel depot hopper on the Lyttelton Line .
- 20 July 1955 – Wellington – A Paekākāriki to Wellington suburban unit, after hitting a slip on the line near Takapu Road, derailed into the path of the other line, and was subsequently hit by a Wellington to Paekākāriki suburban unit. Eight people were injured, one later died of their injuries.
- 24 December 1953, Tangiwai, Manawatū-Whanganui – Tangiwai disaster: An overnight Wellington-to-Auckland express fell into the Whangaehu River after part of the rail bridge it was crossing was swept away by a lahar from Mount Ruapehu's crater lake just minutes earlier; 151 killed.
- 5 December 1952, Kaukapakapa, Auckland – A Maungaturoto to Auckland freight train crashed into a stationary Auckland to Opua mixed train sitting at Kaukapakapa station. One driver was killed and one fireman was seriously injured. Twenty head of cattle were also killed and another 10 later destroyed.
- 22 April 1950, Middlemarch, Otago – At 4:25 a.m. the Cromwell-Dunedin goods train over-ran the up home signal, and collided 5 yards (4.6 m) inside the north points with the Dunedin-Cromwell goods train, locking the two Ab locomotives together.
- 12 April 1950, Levin, Manawatū–Whanganui – A down Palmerston North-Wellington passenger train collided with the up Wellington-Auckland express passenger train at the Levin station platform. The up train had stopped at the main platform but the down home signal was pulled off without reversing the points to bring the down train into the loop.

== 1940–1949 ==
- 25 February 1948, Seddon, Marlborough – Six people were killed and 63 injured when the engine tender overturned, causing the engine to also overturn, as the Picton to Christchurch express train was exiting a tightening curve. The driver admitted a "terrific error" in misjudging his speed. A board of inquiry found the driver guilty of driving at excessive speed but a jury found him not guilty of manslaughter and ascribed the accident to "inefficient administration" by assigning an acting first-grade driver, who was not familiar with the route, to drive the train.
- 20 August 1946, Manawatū Gorge, Manawatū–Whanganui – Two engine crew presumed drowned when a goods train hauled buy a Ka locomotive No Ka 951 was derailed by a slip and fell into the flooded Manawatū River. The engine was recovered days later. The body of the driver was recovered from Foxton Beach; the body of the fireman was never found.
- 22 May 1946, Makarewa, Southland – A Tuatapere to Invercargill mixed train rear-ended a stationary workers' train that was about to leave the station; one killed, 4 injured.
- 14 October 1945 – Melling, Lower Hutt – A car collided with a railcar, the car driver was seriously injured.
- 5 January 1945, Oio, Manawatū–Whanganui – The Night Limited to Wellington with 400 holiday passengers was derailed by a washout about 10.15 pm; though the engine crossed the gap, five cars were derailed and two passengers needed medical attention.
- 8 November 1943, Haywards, Wellington – An Upper Hutt to Wellington suburban train jumped the tracks on a poorly aligned section of line that had been run down due to wartime conditions. Three people were killed and 28 injured. The steam locomotive hauling the train, W^{AB} 794, was repaired and is now in preservation.
- 4 June 1943, Hyde, Otago – Hyde railway disaster: A Cromwell to Dunedin passenger train derailed on a curve due to excessive speed and the driver being intoxicated. 21 people were killed and 47 injured.
- 2 October 1941, Whangaehu, Manawatū–Whanganui – An A^{B} class locomotive and 11 trucks fell into the Whangaehu River after at least one of the trucks derailed while approaching the bridge. 2 injured including the driver P. J. McLaughlin.
- 20 May 1941, Johnsonville, Wellington – two units (EMUs) collided on the Johnsonville Branch (photo)."Two electric units collided". Evening Post in Papers Past. 1941.
- 28 October 1940, Mercer, Waikato – The locomotive of an overnight Wellington to Auckland express jumped the rails on the approach to Mercer station. The driver and fireman were killed and ten others seriously injured. The driver was speeding over a tight (8.2 chain or 160 m radius) curve just south of the station.

== 1930–1939 ==
- 8 April 1938, Winchester, Canterbury – A mixed train without engine ran away at Winchester, running as far as Temuka where it crashed at the end of a siding. One passenger was in the carriage.
- 26 March 1938, Rātana, Manawatū–Whanganui – A fireman and six passengers were killed and over 40 others injured, with 13 hospitalised after a Wellington to New Plymouth excursion train derailed at about 2:18 a.m. and the engine overturned on a tight curve, at about 50 mph (80 km/h), rather than the 35 mph (56 km/h) limit, after the driver misjudged his speed and location due to fog and the general lack of speed recorders in NZR steam engines.
- 18 January 1937, near Arahura, West Coast – A Midland railcar on the Hokitika to Greymouth service was derailed at a level crossing, killing one passenger (see Midland railcar).
- 9 October 1936, Featherston, Wellington, 1936 Wairarapa accident – A southbound Wairarapa class railcar was blown off the rails during a 130 km/h (81 mph) northwesterly gale; eight injured.
- 30 August 1936, Paraparaumu, Wellington, 1936 Paraparaumu train wreck – The Auckland to Wellington express derailed after hitting a slip. Three passengers were taken to hospital with injuries, two were discharged, but the other subsequently died.

== 1920–1929 ==
- 22 March 1929, Paekākāriki – The mail train from Palmerston North derailed between Paekākāriki and Pukerua Bay. Four carriages and guards' van toppled 40 feet down a bank on to the beach. The carriages ended up on their sides and the guards' van upside down. The 30 passengers escaped with just bruises and cuts.
- 20 December 1926 – A Taumarunui-Ohakune goods train hauled by loco X-446 was derailed on the traps when a signalman (he was a relief porter) set the road loop to Marton instead of yard to Marton. THe driver and fireman were blamed for not checking the position of the traps.
- 22 September 1925, Opapa – Three killed and several others seriously injured after the Wellington to Napier mail train derailed as a result of excessive speed entering a curve. The driver was subsequently convicted of manslaughter (Pierre says two not three people were killed.
- 6 July 1923, near Taumarunui, Ongarue railway disaster – An Auckland to Wellington express derailed after hitting a landslide blocking the line; 17 killed, 28 injured.

== 1910–1919 ==
- 15 May 1919, Mataroa, Manawatū–Whanganui – A runaway goods train derailed at a curve beyond Ngaurukehu after exceeding 100 miles per hour when Westinghouse brakes failed to respond when applied in the guards van. The train was wrecked, with the contents and parts of wagons being thrown more than 100 yards ahead of the engine. The driver was fatally injured and the fireman severely scalded.
- 31 January 1919, Moutohora, Gisborne - the engine fireman Eric Adams, 20 was killed when a train of the Motuhora Stone Quarries Companys derailled when travelling between the crusher and the railway station.
- 8 November 1918, Mataroa, Manawatū-Whanganui – An Auckland to Wellington express derailed after hitting a landslide of papa blocking the line. Four were killed, two passengers and two postal employees.
- 27 May 1914, Whangamarino, Waikato – A Wellington to Auckland express train rear-ended a northbound freight train after it passed a faulty semaphore signal that incorrectly displayed clear instead of danger. Three people were killed (including the Mayor of Lower Hutt Orton Stevens), and five seriously injured.
- 3 May 1913, Aratika near Otira, West Coast - The express train from Otira to Greymouth ran into a cow about 400 yards on the Otira side of Aratika, 19 miles from Greymouth. The accident occurred about 7.50 p.m., and it was dark at the time. The train was travelling at from twenty to twenty-five miles an hour. The train consisted of a locomotive, three carriages, and one van. The locomotive kept to the track, but the first two carriages fell, the one nearest the engine rolling on its side. The third car was also derailed, but kept on the track.
- 20 February 1911, Paekākāriki, Wellington – The Napier Express was approaching Paekākāriki from the south (on the North–South Junction), when a large boulder dislodged from above on the Paekākāriki Escarpment rolled down onto a second class carriage, killing Alice Power (23y) from Greymouth who was travelling with two friends.

== 1900–1909 ==
- 16 October 1907, Sefton, Canterbury – on Death's Corner a sharp curve near Sefton, the Christchurch-Culverden Express from Culverden had two front loco bogie wheels leave the rails on the incline south of Balcairn station. The wheels went over a road crossing cattle stop and culvert. The driver applied the air brakes and stopped the train in two train lengths; there were no injuries.
- 3 August 1907, between Putāruru and Mamaku, Waikato – When locomotive crew noticed a fault in the second engine hauling a 230 tonne train up the 1 in 36 Mamaku Incline, they stopped the train to investigate the problem. After applying both the Westinghouse brakes and hand brakes on the lead wagons, the crew decoupled the engines from the train to investigate the engine fault further. However, when the Westinghouse brakes lost pressure the train ran backwards down the steep slope and could not be stopped by hand brakes applied in the guard's van and passenger carriage. After passing through Ngatira at 70 miles an hour, the guard's van derailed on an S bend and took the rest of the train over an embankment into a gully, fatally injuring the guard and seriously injuring five of the seven other passengers on the train; the wreckage caught fire and 45 cattle beasts were also killed or had to be destroyed, although 37 others survived.
- 29 March 1907, Rakaia, Canterbury – Head-on collision between a northbound troop train and a southbound special train that had not waited at Bankside station for the troop train to pass. Only two persons injured and two horses killed because the passenger carriage behind the southbound engine was empty when it telescoped under the engine tender and was demolished and the horsebox behind the engine on the troop train carried just one person.
- 26 March 1907, Lyttelton, Canterbury – The train carrying passengers to the inter-island ferry ran out of brakes and overran the stop block at the end of the Lyttelton wharf. Fortunately only the front half of the engine went over the end of the wharf, and being of Fairlie's Patent design only the cowcatcher and driving gear fell into the sea. When the driving gear was recovered, the diver also found a goods wagon that had been missing for a year.
- 24 June 1905, Chaneys, near Kaiapoi, Canterbury – A Christchurch to Kaiapoi train derailed when an embankment collapsed after being weakened by floodwaters. Two people were killed and one seriously injured after being crushed between the carriages.

== 1899 and earlier ==
- 11 March 1899, Rakaia, Canterbury, Rakaia railway accident – Two Ashburton to Christchurch excursion trains collided when the second train rear-ended the first; four killed, 22 injured.
- 29 March 1888, Kaiwharawhara, Wellington. The Hutt Valley Line was cut by a "southerly buster" with gale-force winds and high tides which washed-out 1.5 km (1 mile) of track, leaving rails and sleepers suspended in mid-air and the evening train from Wellington stranded in the middle. Traffic from Ngauranga to Petone was halted for a week until 6 April after a workforce of 300 men restored the line.
- 11 September 1880, Wellington, Rimutaka Incline railway accident on the Rimutaka Incline – The leading three carriages on a Greytown to Wellington train were blown off the track in strong winds near the Siberia tunnel; three killed, 11 injured.

== See also ==
- List of rail accidents by country
- Rail Safety Week
