= Turangarere railway station =

Railway station in New Zealand

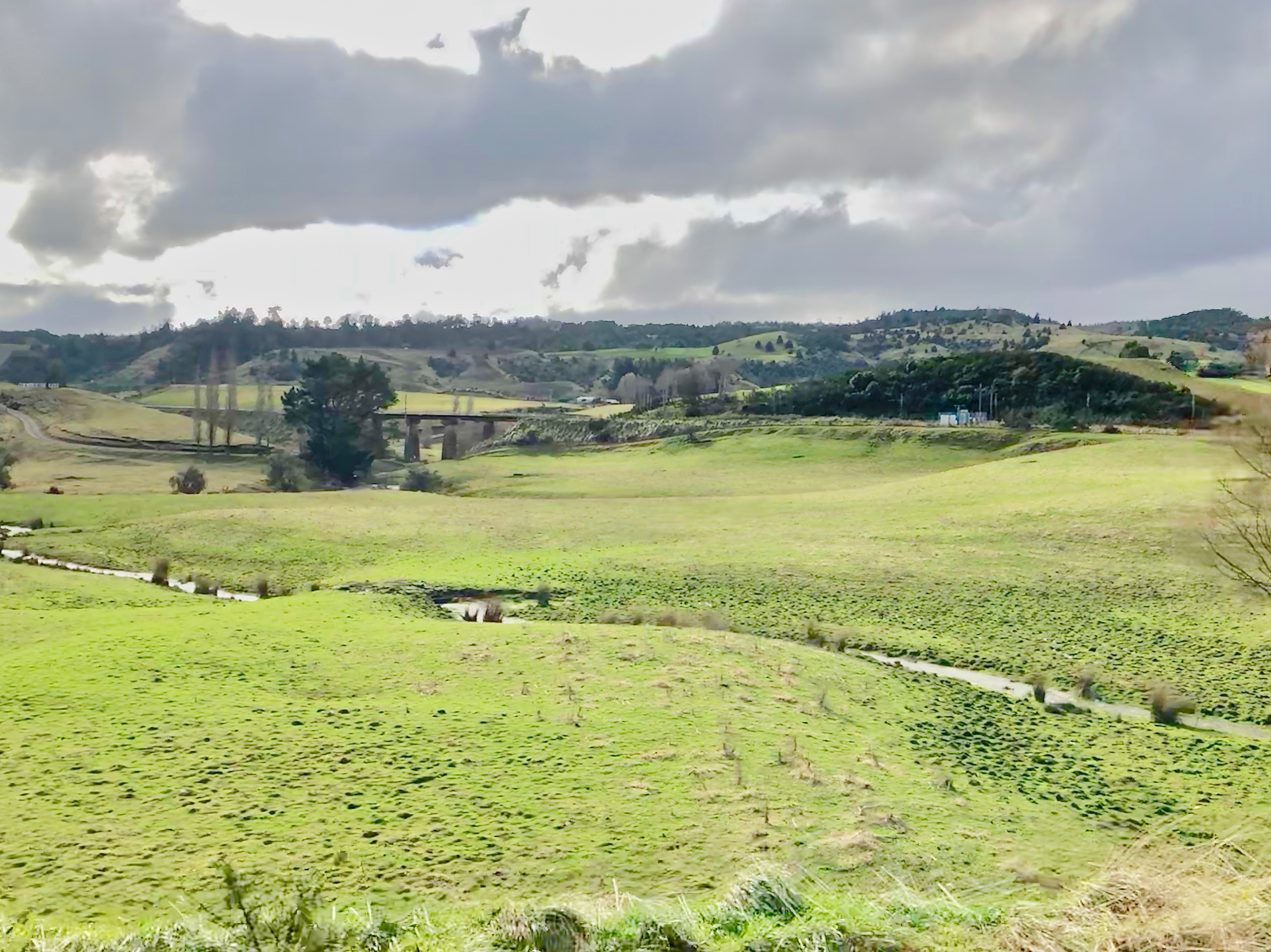
- Hautapu Bridge from the horseshoe curve in 2018. A substation is at the site of Turangerere station

General information
- Location: New Zealand
- Coordinates: 39.585536°S 175.732558°E
- Elevation: 702 m (2,303 ft)
- Line: North Island Main Trunk
- Distance: Wellington 270.79 km (168.26 mi)

History
- Opened: 1906
- Closed: 23 October 1966
- Electrified: June 1988

Services
Preceding station	Historical railways	Following station
Hīhītahi; Line open, station closed 3.05 km (1.90 mi)	North Island Main Trunk; KiwiRail	Ngaurukehu; Line open, station closed 3.91 km (2.43 mi)
Location

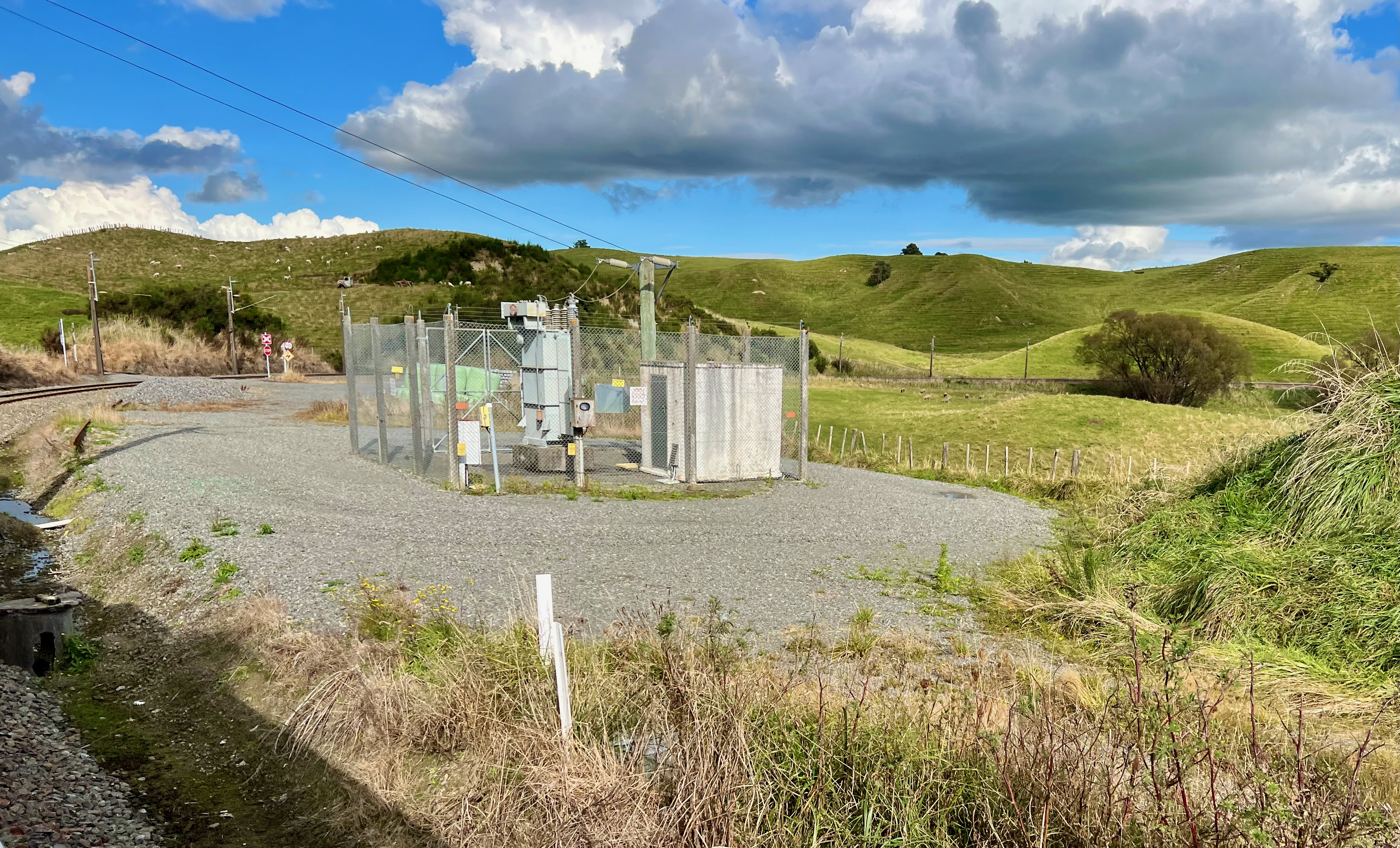
Turangarere transformer and horseshoe curve in 2023

Turangarere was a flag station on the North Island Main Trunk line, in the Ruapehu District of New Zealand, in the Hautapu River valley. Turangarere is part way up a 1 in 70 gradient from Mataroa to Hīhītahi, so that it is 62 m (203 ft) above Ngaurukehu and 39 m (128 ft) below Hīhītahi. The station was on a horseshoe curve, formed to avoid an even steeper gradient, by adding about 1.5 mi (2.4 km) to the route. Only a single track now remains through the former station site.

== Name ==
In 1909 it was proposed to name the crossing siding Hautapu. However, it became Gardner & Son's Siding, usually abbreviated to Gardners Siding, which was changed to Turangaarere on 25 October 1928. The Geographical Board recognised a change from Tarangarere to Turangaarere in 1929. Hīhītahi, the next settlement up the line, had its name changed from Turangaarere in 1910.

== History ==
The line from Mataroa to Turangarere was completed and equipped with a telegraph line by the Public Works Department in 1906. The line to the tunnel entrance to the south was in place by August 1906. It was transferred to NZR on 1 July 1908. Railway houses were added in 1920.

== Bridge ==
Turangarere Bridge has five 44 ft (13 m) spans to cross the Hautapu. It was built under a co-operative contract by 1899. All the timber other than the maire blocks had to be brought from Taihape. The river was diverted in 1905 to avoid the need for a further two bridges.

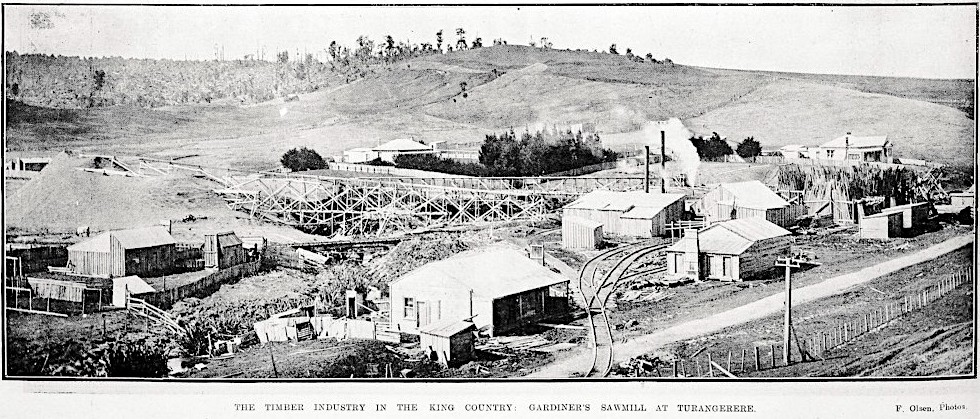
Gardner's sawmill in 1919

== Gardner's sawmill ==
In 1905 Gardner and Sons had cutting-rights over a considerable area of kahikatea, rimu, matai, and totara. Initially the timber was mainly for railway construction, as the roads were too poor to take it to the then railhead at Taihape, then the terminus of the railway. The mill was powered by a 36 hp (27 kW) steam engine. Gardner's applied for a private siding here in 1906 and had a 5-year agreement by 1 December 1908.

The settlement was large enough to support a school and a public hall. The mill closed when the bush around it had been felled. At that time, in 1927, it employed 20.
