= Hīhītahi railway station =

Railway station in New Zealand

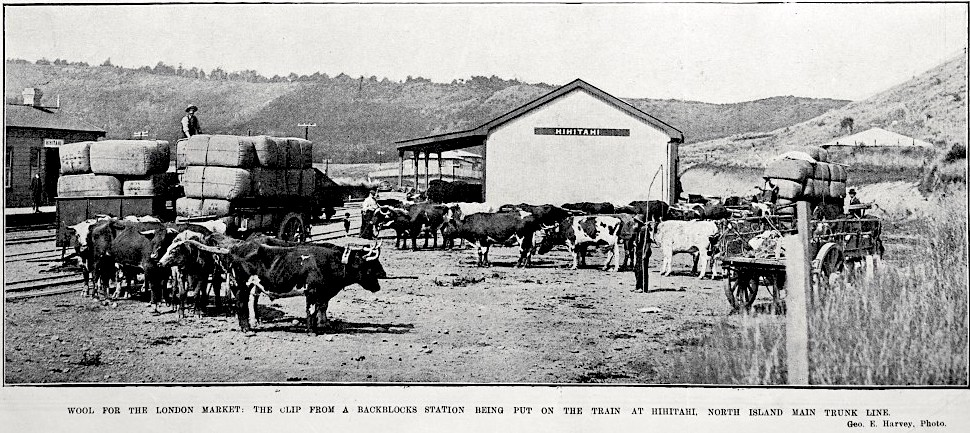
- Hīhītahi station in 1911

General information
- Location: New Zealand
- Coordinates: 39.570497°S 175.705783°E
- Elevation: 741 m (2,431 ft)
- Line: North Island Main Trunk
- Distance: Wellington 270.79 km (168.26 mi)

History
- Opened: 1 July 1908
- Closed: 31 January 1982
- Electrified: June 1988

Services
Preceding station	Historical railways	Following station
Waiouru; Line open, station closed	North Island Main Trunk; KiwiRail	Turangarere; Line open, station closed
Location

Hīhītahi was a station on the North Island Main Trunk line, in the Rangitikei District of New Zealand, in the Hautapu River valley. The station served the settlement of Hīhītahi, which was big enough to have a store and a school. It was 12.55 km (7.80 mi) south of Waiouru and 3.05 km (1.90 mi) north of Turangarere. Hīhītahi is at the top of a 1 in 70 gradient from Mataroa, so that it is 39 m (128 ft) above Turangarere, but only 73 m (240 ft) below the much more distant Waiouru. A crossing loop remains.

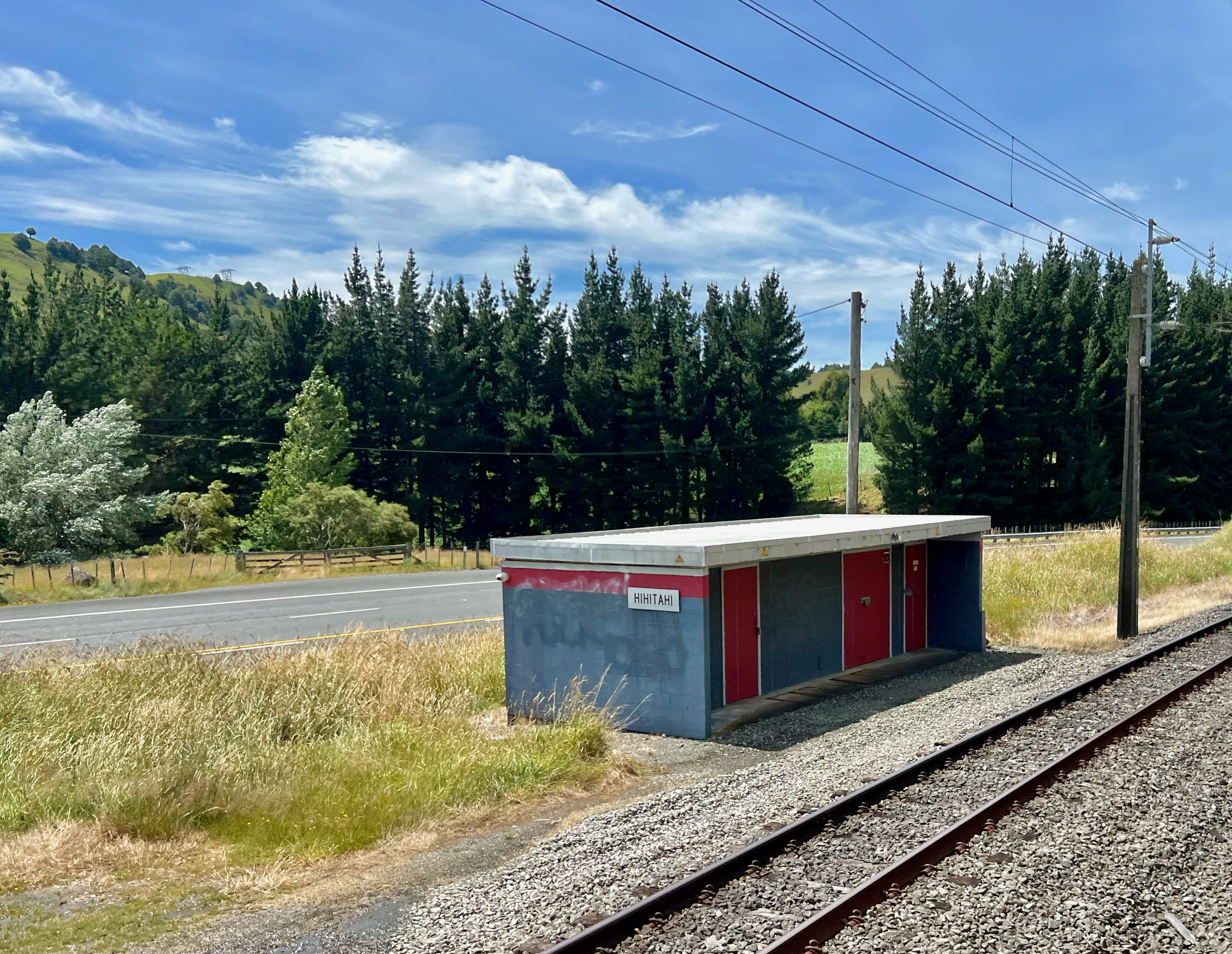
Hīhītahi railway crossing loop in 2024

== Name ==
Hīhītahi means the first rays of the sun. When opened on 1 July 1908 the station was Tarangarere, changed to Turangaarere on 15 April 1909 and to Hihitahi on 21 August 1910.

Until 25 October 1928 the crossing sidings to the south were called Gardner & Sons Siding, or Gardners Siding but then took the former name of its northern neighbour, Turangaarere, later becoming Turangarere.

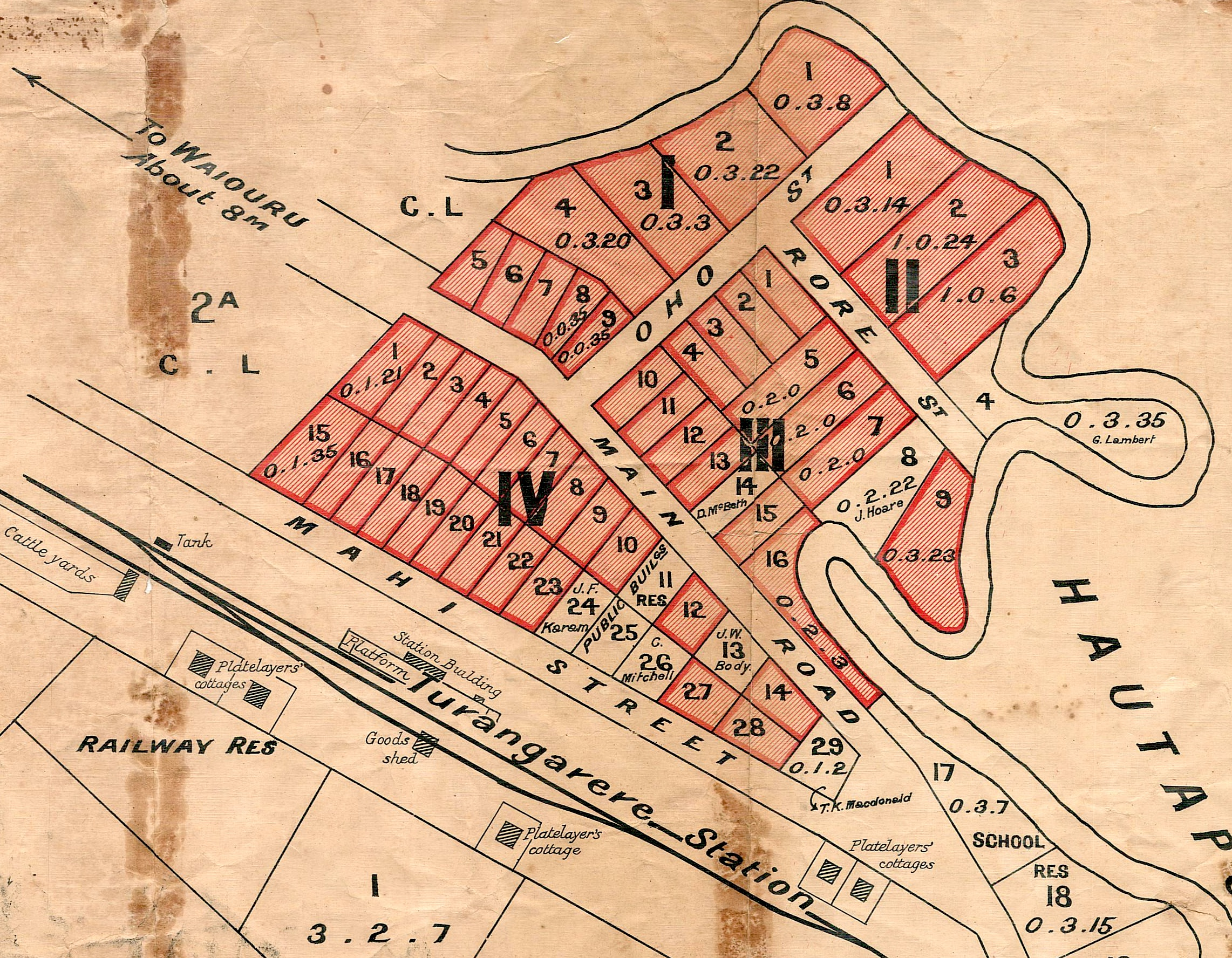
1909 Hīhītahi map showing the station layout and planned township

== History ==
A service road to help with building the railway was formed in 1887, when the route was first surveyed. The Public Works Department (PWD) had the rail and telegraph lines through Hīhītahi built by 1906. NZR took it over as a flag station on 1 July 1908, when the railhead from the south was extended from Mataroa to Waiouru.

A plan for the proposed station was made in 1903. Tenders were invited on 4 March 1907. On 7 June 1907 a contract was let to A S Johnston of Hunterville for £2,201.0s.7d and the station was built by January 1908. When opened it was 66 ft (20 m) by 14 ft (4.3 m), with rooms for stationmaster, luggage, a lobby, urinals and ladies, on a 240 ft (73 m) by 15 ft (4.6 m) platform. There was also a 40 ft (12 m) by 30 ft (9.1 m) goods shed with verandah, a loading bank, cattle yards, two 4,000 imp gal (18,000 L) water tanks and a cart approach. Cottages for railway staff were built from 1904 to 1955. A crossing loop could take 54 wagons and a snowplough was kept at the station.

The station lost its passenger trains before 1972 and closed to all traffic on 31 January 1982.

== Bridges to Waiouru ==
Between Hīhītahi and Waiouru the railway has four bridges over the Hautapu River. They are made up of spans of –

- 66 ft (20 m), 2 x 33 ft (10 m) and 4 x 22 ft (6.7 m)
- 66 ft (20 m) and 7 x 22 ft (6.7 m),
- 2 x 33 ft (10 m) and 4 x 22 ft (6.7 m)
- 66 ft (20 m), 3 x 33 ft (10 m) and 2 x 22 ft (6.7 m)

The 66 ft spans were latticed girders, and the others plate girders.

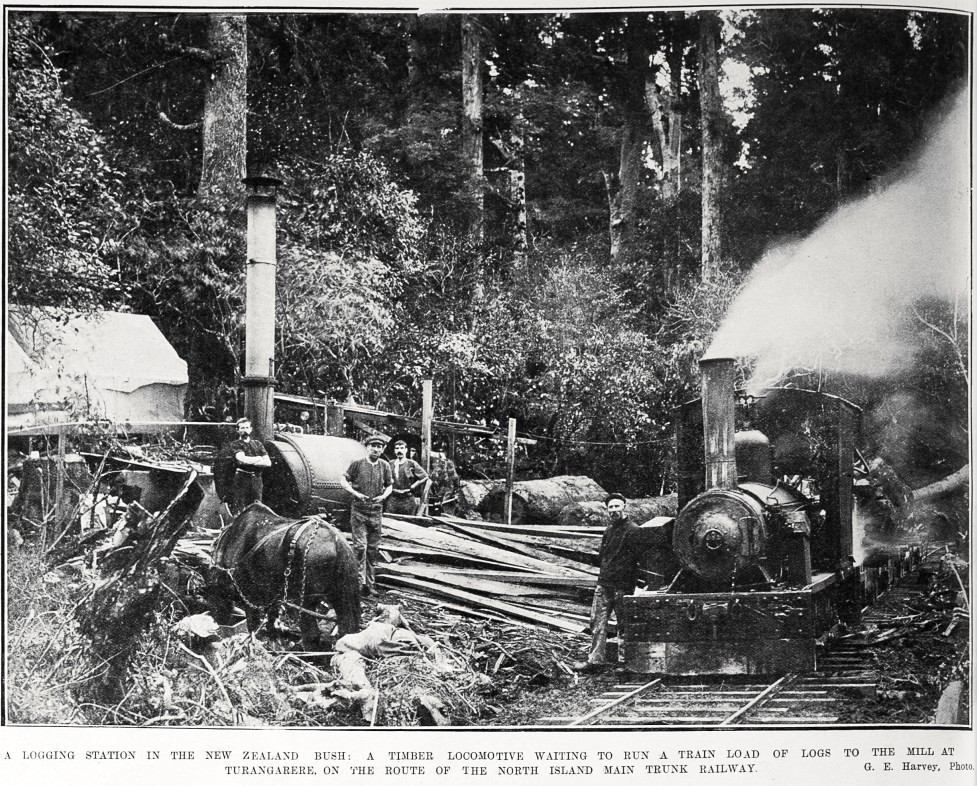
Turangarere logging tramway in 1911

== Tramways ==
There were at least three tramway networks in the area, which took timber to sawmills and the railway. Gibbs & Trevor had a tramway running west from the station and George Gardner had tramways to the north west. They had a 1927 Type Cb 0-4-4-0 built by A & G Price. In 1906 a tramway ran to the PWD siding and next year, W G Irvine applied to run one beside the railway. Quin Bros siding was noted in 1909 and, in 1910, owners of the Hawera Sash & Door Co Ltd, had a 4 mi (6.4 km) tramway linking their logging area to their mill and the railway. They used a 1909 Type A 0-4-0 T built by J. Johnston's Vulcan Foundry at Invercargill and a 1914 0-4-4-0 by G & D Davidson Ltd. of Hokitika. The tramways were dismantled about 1934, when the bush had been cleared.

== Incidents ==
In 1940 a boulder, estimated to weigh 120 tons, slipped onto the line just north of the station, derailing K-Class locomotive, No.919. KA-Class No.945 suffered a similar crash in 1961.

Slips in 1935 and 1945 closed the line for several days.
