= Teviotdale (disambiguation) =

Teviotdale is can refer to the following:

== Places ==
Canada

- Teviotdale, Ontario, a village in Perth County, Ontario

Scotland

- Teviotdale, a traditional province closely equivalent to Roxburghshire
- Teviotdale, Scottish Borders - the valley of the River Teviot in Roxburghshire

United States

- Teviotdale (Linlithgo, New York), a historic home in the state of New York

== People ==
- David Teviotdale (1870–1958), a New Zealand farmer and museum director
- Duke of Cumberland and Teviotdale, a title in the British peerage held by junior members of the British royal family

== See also ==
- Archdeacon of Teviotdale
- River Teviot
