= Ngaurukehu railway station =

Railway station in New Zealand

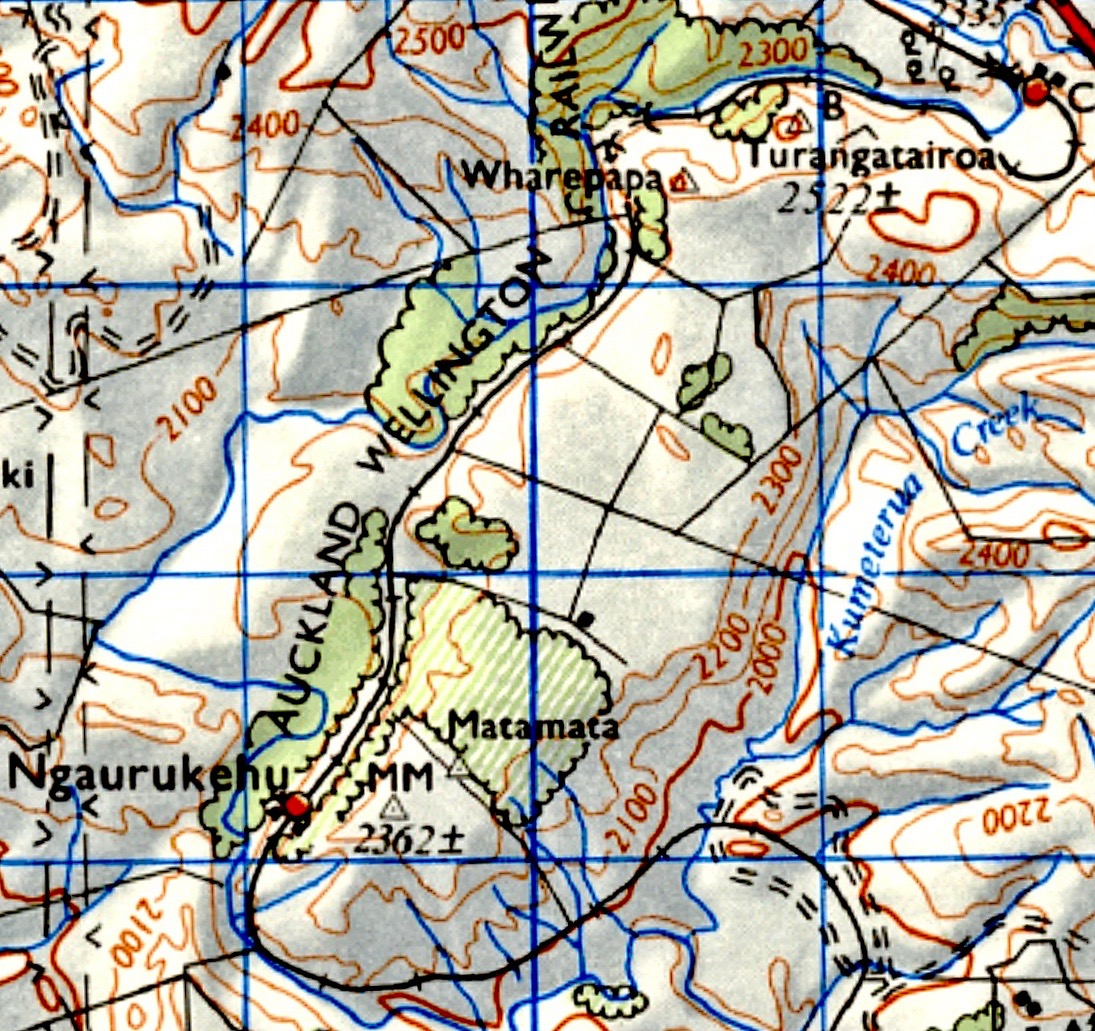
- Ngaurukehu railway station on 1970 map

General information
- Location: New Zealand
- Coordinates: 39.611300°S 175.708200°E
- Elevation: 640 m (2,100 ft)
- Line: North Island Main Trunk
- Distance: Wellington 270.79 km (168.26 mi)

History
- Opened: 1 July 1909
- Closed: 1992
- Electrified: June 1988

Services
Preceding station	Historical railways	Following station
Turangarere; Line open, station closed	North Island Main Trunk; KiwiRail	Mataroa; Line open, station closed
Location

Ngaurukehu, Ngarukehu, or Ngaurakehu, was a flag station on the North Island Main Trunk line, in the Ruapehu District of New Zealand. It is in the Hautapu River valley. It was 9.64 km (5.99 mi) north of Mataroa, 3.91 km (2.43 mi) south of Turangarere. Ngaurukehu is part way up a 1 in 70 gradient from Mataroa to Hīhītahi, so that it is 110 m (360 ft) above Mataroa and 62 m (203 ft) below Turangarere. It now has three passing loops.

== History ==
The line through Ngaurukehu was built and equipped with a telegraph line by the Public Works Department (PWD) in 1906. It was transferred to NZR on 1 July 1908, but sidings north and south of the single track weren't opened until Thursday 1 July 1909. They were added to reduce delays caused by trains waiting to clear each other on the climb from Mataroa to Turangarere. Ngaurukehu was staffed by two tablet porters, with a signalbox and houses. 2 more state houses were built in 1955 and by 1957 the crossing loop had been extended, with motor points and colour light signals. Tenders for further extension of the loop were invited in 1973.

To the north of the station, the 112 m (367 ft) Ngaurukehu, or Rabbit, tunnel, was prepared for electrification in 1984.

== Incidents ==
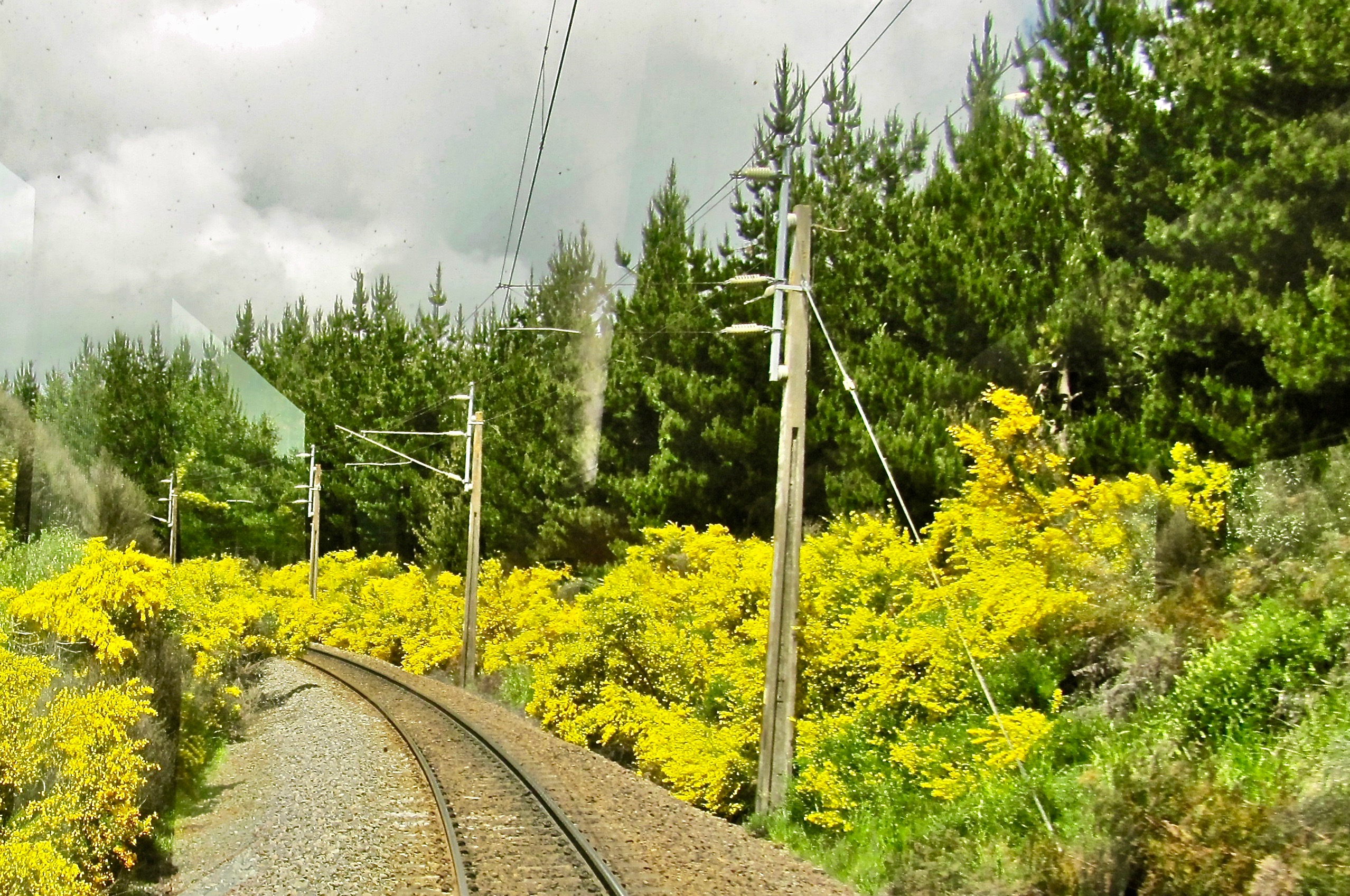
Broom between Ngaurukehu and Turangerere in November 2010.

A train driver was killed 3 mi (4.8 km) south of Ngaurukehu in 1919, when the brakes failed and his train ran out of control down the hill.

On 5 December 1923 a guard was injured when his van overturned after a goods train was reversed from the north siding, holding 46 wagons, into the south siding, which only had room for 41, the remainder falling off the end of the track. Some of the debris later fell onto a coach on an express train. In 1929 Cabinet approved extension of the south backshunt for £400.

Slips were a common problem. Between Hīhītahi and Ngaurukehu a slip derailed an engine in 1918, part of a goods train in 1923 and a large boulder overturned a locomotive and derailed nine wagons in 1940. Slips in the vicinity of the station delayed trains in 1912, 1926, 1929, 1930, 1935, 1940.

== Scientific Reserve ==
To the west of the railway 215 acres (87 ha) was taken on 20 August 1911 for Maungakaretu (now Ngaurukehu) Scientific Reserve, which protects several plants, including the rare Small-leaved Tree Daisy, Olearia gardneri. It is threatened by broom, Cytisus scoparius, and Khasia berry, Cotoneaster simonsii, which are common in the area. The 1907 recommendation was for protection of a rather larger area.
