= Mataroa railway station =

Railway station in New Zealand

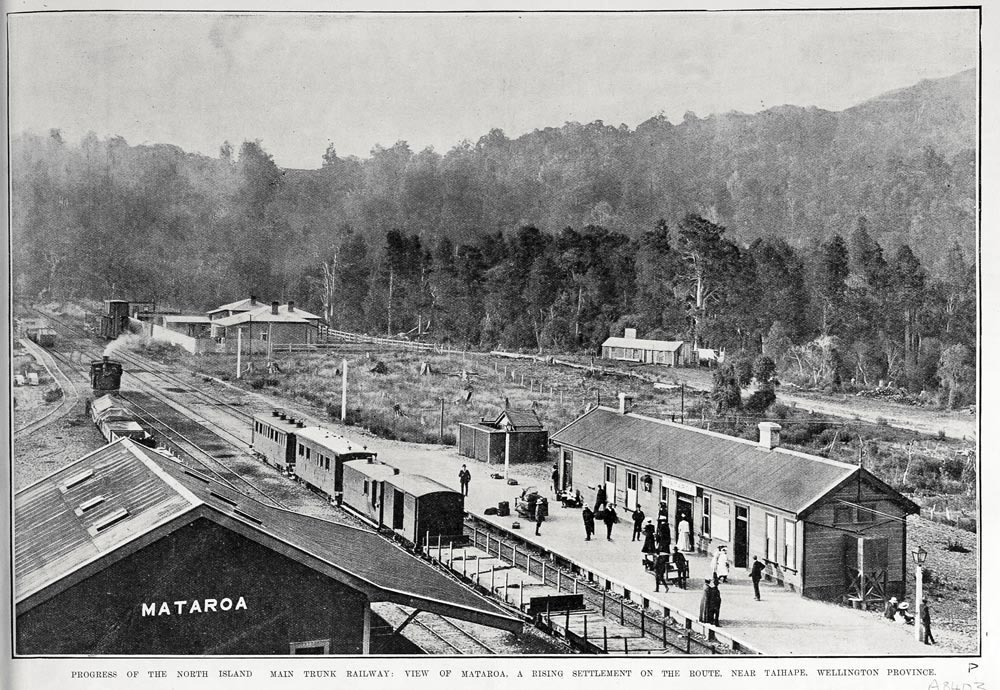
- Mataroa in 1908

General information
- Location: New Zealand
- Coordinates: 39.649169°S 175.719253°E
- Elevation: 530 m (1,740 ft)
- Line: North Island Main Trunk
- Distance: Wellington 261.15 km (162.27 mi)

History
- Opened: 11 September 1905
- Closed: Passenger 8 September 1975; Goods 22 September 1986
- Electrified: June 1988

Services
Preceding station	Historical railways	Following station
Ngaurukehu; Line open, station closed 9.64 km (5.99 mi)	North Island Main Trunk; KiwiRail	Taihape; Line open, station closed 9.3 km (5.8 mi)
Location

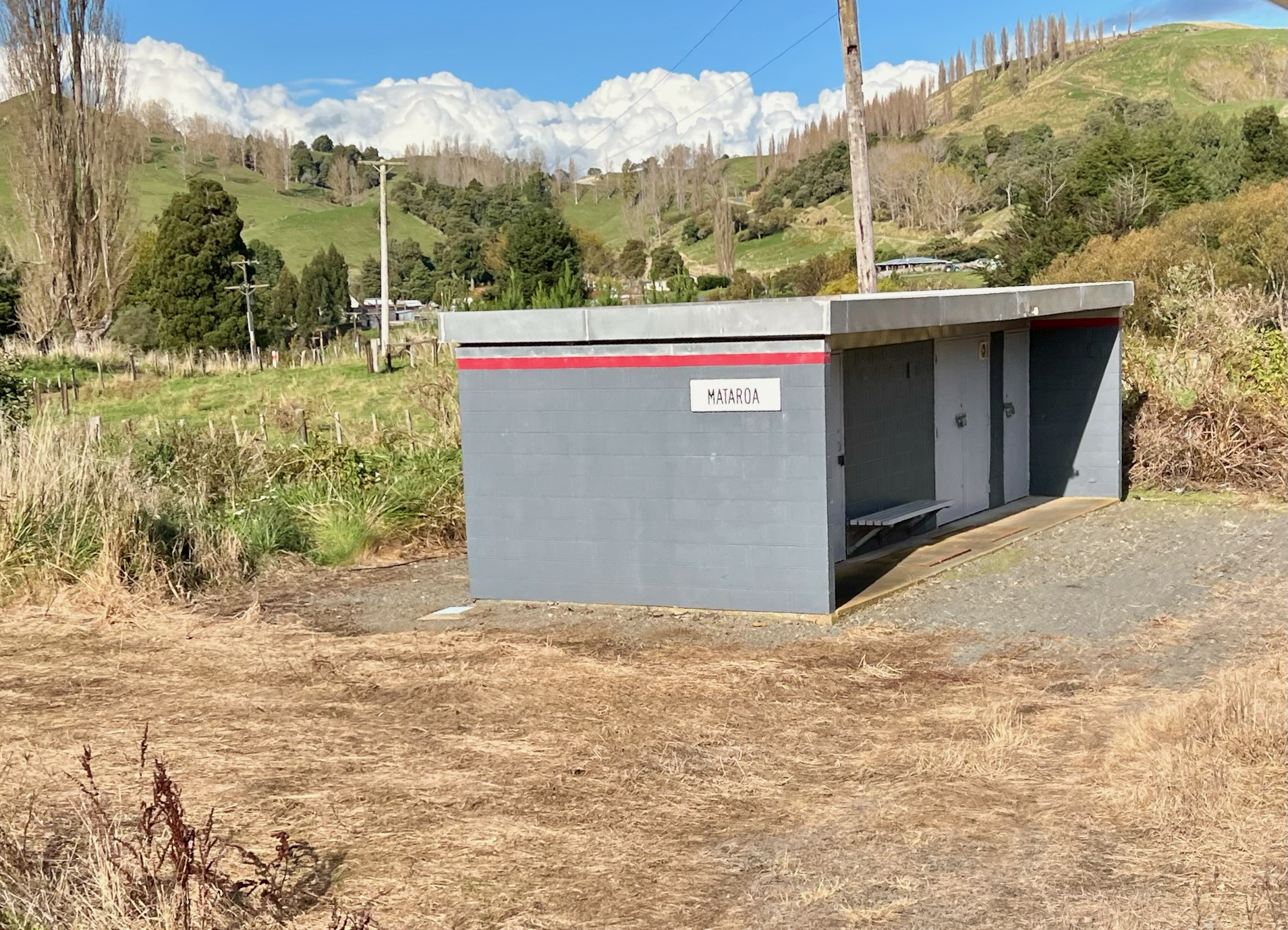
Mataroa station site in 2023

Mataroa was a station on the North Island Main Trunk line, in the Ruapehu District of New Zealand. It served the village of Mataroa. Mataroa is part way up a long gradient from Taihape to Waiouru, beginning at 1 in 60, but largely 1 in 70 from Mataroa to Hīhītahi, so that Mataroa is 88 m (289 ft) above Taihape and 110 m (360 ft) below Ngaurukehu.

== History ==
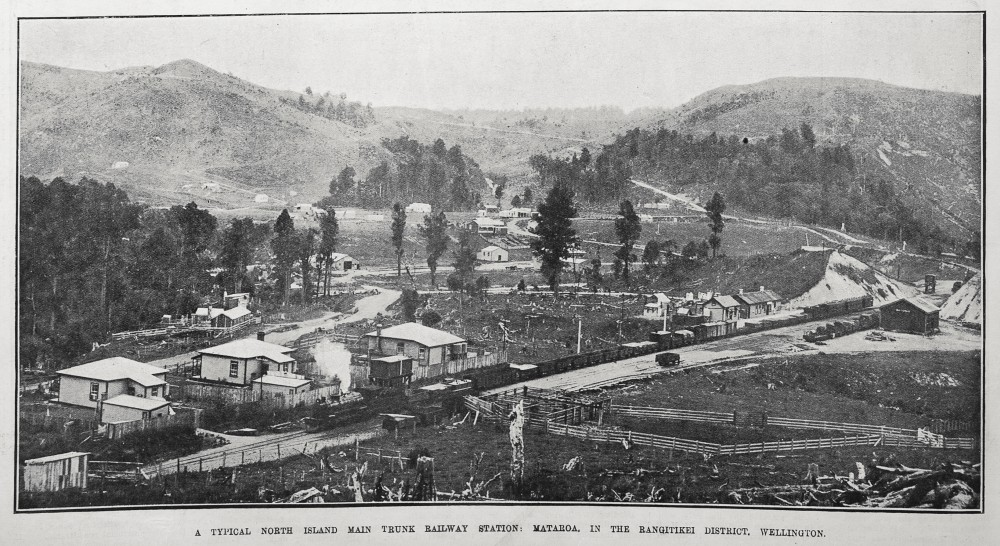
Mataroa in 1911

Construction by the Public Works Department (PWD) was well advanced by 1903. By March 1905 a station yard was being formed and by April 1906 it was the railhead, with a pumice road running north as far as Makatote. As well as the tunnels (see below), the line from Taihape included a 70 ft (21 m) cutting. North of Mataroa, PWD trains ran to Rangataua by July 1907 and to Ohakune by January 1908.

PWD transferred the station to NZ Railways (NZR) on 1 June 1907, when the line was opened by the local MP, Arthur Remington, after which Mataroa had 3 mixed trains a day. Before that, passengers had been carried on ballast trains, or passenger trains during 1906-7 Christmas and New Year holidays, goods had been carried from 11 September 1905 and regular freight began on 18 May 1906. The line to Waiouru was transferred to NZR on 1 July 1908, so that passengers no longer had to change trains at Mataroa.

In October 1905 a £1600 contract for station buildings was let, but in 1906 it was decided an extension was needed, so in 1907 another contract was let for £827. That station burnt down in 1928 and was replaced in 1929, with electric lighting added in 1930.

By 1 July 1907 there was a passing loop for 55 wagons, a passenger platform with a cart approach, a loading bank, a 30 ft (9.1 m) x 40 ft (12 m) goods shed and cattle and sheep yards. A station building, fixed signals and stationmaster's house were added by 1 August 1908. The crossing loop was extended in 1957.

From August 1906 Smith & Donald's sawmill had a 2 mi (3.2 km) tramway to the railway. Another mill was linked by 1.5 mi (2.4 km) of tramway.

A cottage for railway workers was built in 1904, platelayers' cottages followed in 1907 and 1908 and 2 more state houses were added in 1954.

From December 1905 there was a telegraph line from Taihape, which was extended to Turangarere and Bennett's Siding in 1906.

A post office started on 5 June 1907, was operated by NZR staff from 16 July 1908 and removed from the station on 14 February 1969.

Mataroa had a station master from 22 August 1906 until 10 November 1967.

== Patronage ==
As shown in the table and graph below, passenger numbers were highest when passengers had to change at the station, but then fell to an average of around 20 a day. However, cattle, sheep, wool and timber traffic was heavy. Of the stations between Hamilton and Marton, Mataroa ranked around 8th in importance in terms of the value of its goods traffic.

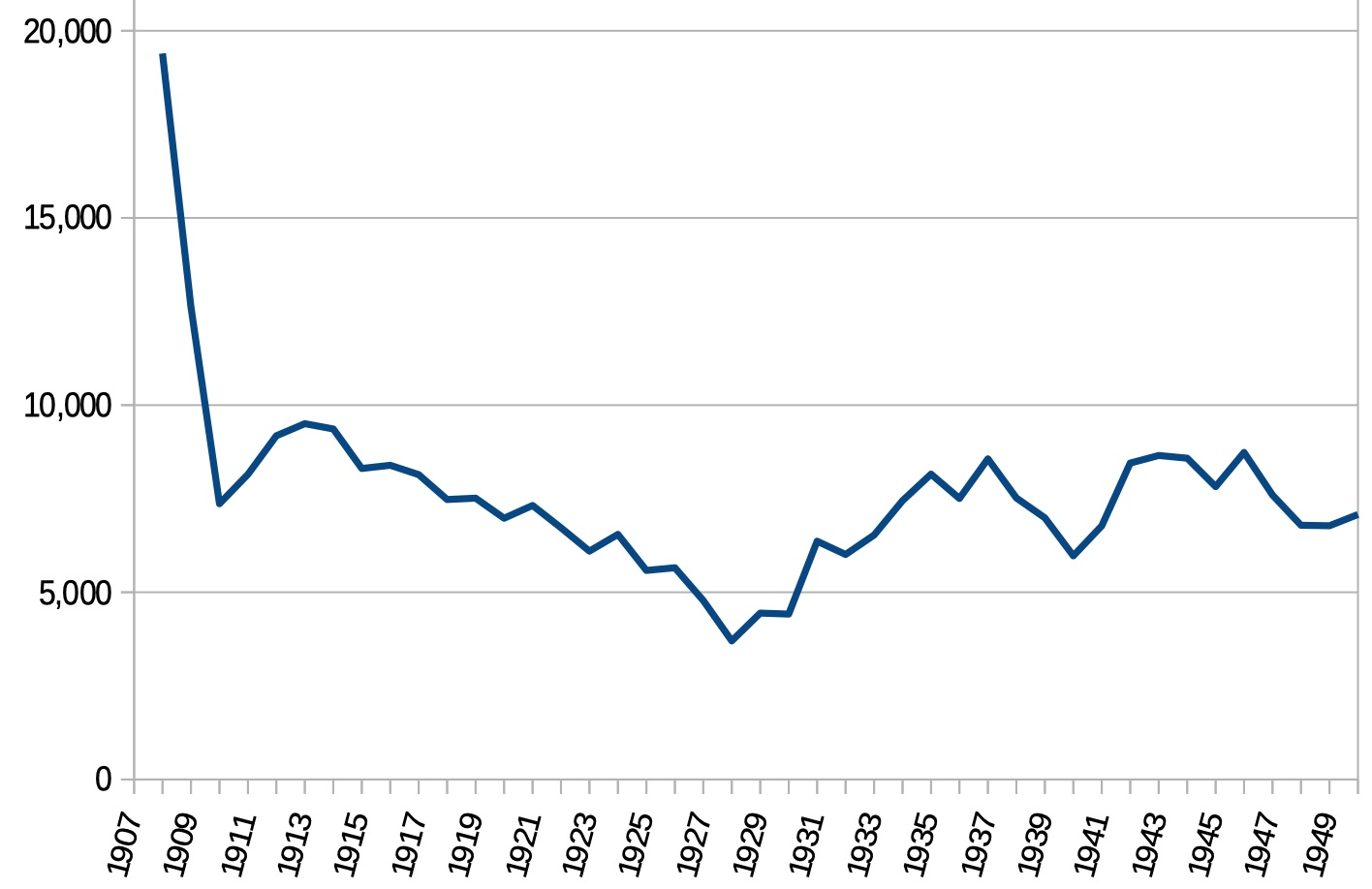
Mataroa ticket sales 1907–1950 – derived from annual returns to Parliament of "Statement of Revenue for each Station for the Year ended"

year	tickets	season tickets	staff
1907			2
1908	19,395	21	3
1909	12,616	97	3
1910	7,364	63	3
1911	8,151	92	3
1912	9,179	112	3
1913	9,503	136	4
1914	9,363	134	
1915	8,306	166	
1916	8,392	173	
1917	8,143	142	
1918	7,477	154	
1919	7,515	120	
1920	6,978	136	
1921	7,320	175	
1922	6,724	179	
1923	6,098	183	
1924	6,545	193	
1925	5,582	210	
1926	5,654	258	
1927	4,780	182	
1928	3,700	114	
1929	4,444	102	
1930	4,417	111	
1931	6,363	108	
1932	6,009	53	
1933	6,527	48	
1934	7,446	26	
1935	8,157	18	
1936	7,507	9	
1937	8,564	4	
1938	7,518	38	
1939	6,987	13	
1940	5,974	9	
1941	6,774	19	
1942	8,452	14	
1943	8,654		
1944	8,583	1	
1945	7,823		
1946	8,736		
1947	7,595		
1948	6,791		
1949	6,776		
1950	7,078		

== Mataroa and Hedgehog tunnels ==
The railway follows the Hautapu River for most of the way from Utiku to Waiouru, but, south of Mataroa, the railway burrows under Motukawa to get more directly via the Namunui Stream valley, through a 660 yd (600 m) tunnel. Boring of the tunnel started in 1903, breakthrough was made in 1904, or possibly 1905, and it was completed in 1906. The tunnel was prepared for electrification in 1984.

In 1985 the 120 yd (110 m), curved No.12 (Hedgehog) tunnel, north of Taihape, was bypassed to facilitate electrification, reducing the distance between Taihape and Mataroa from 5 mi 79 ch (9.6 km) to 9.3 km (5.8 mi). The cost was $938,011.

== Bennett's Private Siding ==
H.D. Bennett had a sawmill 1 November 1905 applied for a siding, 2 mi 30 ch (3.8 km) from Taihape. It was built in 1906 with space for 38 wagons and serving four sawmills. The locality is now known as Bennetts Siding.

== Incidents ==
There have been slips on the line from the beginning. They overturned locomotives in 1907 and 1918. Four were killed when an express hit a slip later in 1918 and the same slip blocked the line again the next month. More slips occurred in 1920, 1923, 1924, 1930, 1939, 1940, and 1945, a guard's van was derailed in 1941 and the line closed twice in 1942, firstly by a landslip, then a derailed goods train.

A train driver was killed in 1919 when the brakes failed and his train ran out of control down the hill.
