= Mataroa =

Settlement in Manawatū-Whanganui, New Zealand

- Rural community
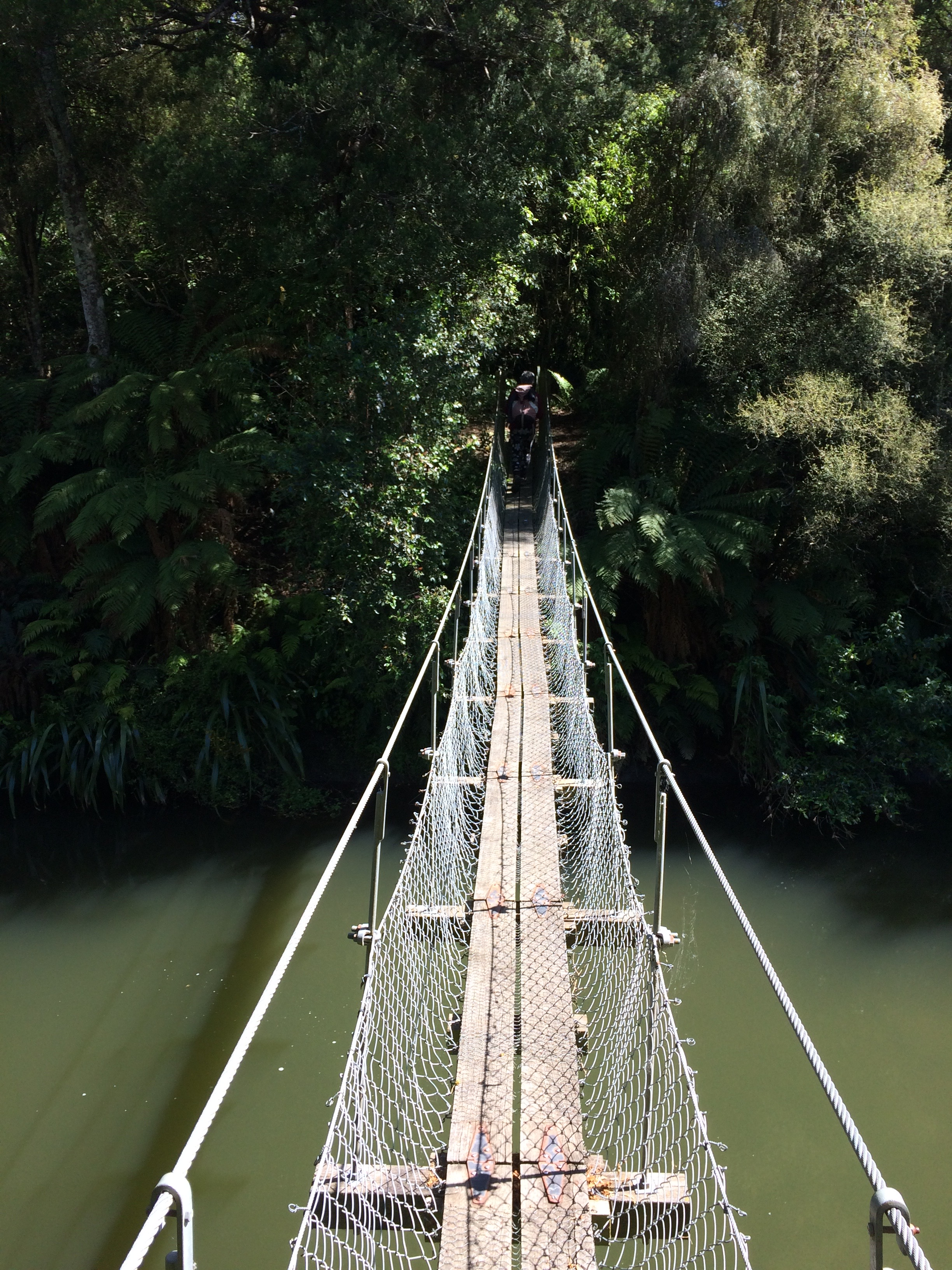
- Paengaroa Scenic Reserve, viewed from across the Hautapu River
- Interactive map of Mataroa
- Coordinates: 39.652°S 175.720°E
- Country: New Zealand
- Region: Manawatū-Whanganui
- Territorial authority: Rangitikei District
- Wards: Northern General Ward; Tiikeitia ki Uta (Inland) Māori Ward
- Community: Taihape Community
- Electorates: Rangitīkei; Te Tai Hauāuru (Māori)

Government
  - Territorial Authority: Rangitikei District Council
  - Regional council: Horizons Regional Council
  - Mayor of Rangitikei: Andy Watson
  - Rangitīkei MP: Suze Redmayne
  - Te Tai Hauāuru MP: Debbie Ngarewa-Packer

Area
  - Total: 38.37 km^{2} (14.81 sq mi)

Population (2023 Census)
  - Total: 126
  - Density: 3.28/km^{2} (8.51/sq mi)

Mataroa is a settlement in the Rangitikei District and Manawatū-Whanganui region of New Zealand's North Island.

The area was already settled by the Māori iwi Ngāti Rangi by the time William Colenso made the first recorded European visit in 1845.

Railway surveyors cut a rough track through the district in 1884, and wool farmers began clearing the area in the following decades. The Mataroa Tunnel was dug through the area in the early 1900s. The Main Trunk railway line was laid through it in 1906 and it began to carry trains in 1907.

The Paengaroa Scenic Reserve is located in Mataroa. It includes a carpark, picnicking area, and ten minute walking track.

== Demographics ==
Mataora locality covers 38.37 km^{2} (14.81 sq mi). It is part of the larger Mokai Patea statistical area.

Historical population
Year	Pop.	±% p.a.
2006	171	—
2013	135	−3.32%
2018	129	−0.91%
2023	126	−0.47%

Mataora had a population of 126 in the 2023 New Zealand census, a decrease of 3 people (−2.3%) since the 2018 census, and a decrease of 9 people (−6.7%) since the 2013 census. There were 66 males and 57 females in 54 dwellings. 2.4% of people identified as LGBTIQ+. The median age was 40.9 years (compared with 38.1 years nationally). There were 24 people (19.0%) aged under 15 years, 27 (21.4%) aged 15 to 29, 54 (42.9%) aged 30 to 64, and 21 (16.7%) aged 65 or older.

People could identify as more than one ethnicity. The results were 90.5% European (Pākehā), 31.0% Māori, 4.8% Pasifika, and 2.4% Asian. English was spoken by 97.6%, Māori by 11.9%, and other languages by 2.4%. The percentage of people born overseas was 4.8, compared with 28.8% nationally.

The sole religious affiliation given was 33.3% Christian. People who answered that they had no religion were 50.0%, and 11.9% of people did not answer the census question.

Of those at least 15 years old, 18 (17.6%) people had a bachelor's or higher degree, 69 (67.6%) had a post-high school certificate or diploma, and 15 (14.7%) people exclusively held high school qualifications. The median income was $47,900, compared with $41,500 nationally. 9 people (8.8%) earned over $100,000 compared to 12.1% nationally. The employment status of those at least 15 was 66 (64.7%) full-time and 15 (14.7%) part-time.

== Education ==
Mataroa School is a co-educational state primary school for Year 1 to 8 students, with a roll of 57 as of July 2026. It opened in 1900, and moved to a new building on the present site two years' later.
