= Hyde railway disaster =

1943 railway accident in New Zealand

Coordinates: 45.3517°S 170.2376°E

Details
- Date: 4 June 1943; 13:45 NZST
- Location: Hyde, Otago, South Island
- Country: New Zealand
- Line: Otago Central Railway
- Operator: New Zealand Railways Department
- Incident type: Derailment
- Cause: Excessive speed; Driver intoxicated

Statistics
- Trains: 1
- Passengers: 113
- Deaths: 21

The Hyde railway disaster occurred on 4 June 1943 near the small settlement of Hyde, Otago, New Zealand, on a bend of the Otago Central Railway. At the time, it was New Zealand's worst railway accident; of the 113 passengers on board, 21 were killed and a further 47 were injured. However, just over 10 years later, the Tangiwai disaster took 151 lives on 24 December 1953. The Hyde disaster remains as the second-worst railway accident in New Zealand's history.

== Background ==
The Hyde disaster involved the daily passenger express train from Cromwell to Dunedin. In 1936, a year-round daily passenger express train was introduced, replacing a thrice weekly express that had been augmented by slow mixed trains. This service left Cromwell at 9 am and reached Dunedin at 5:20 pm; in 1937, the schedule was accelerated by half an hour and it was this timetable that was in force on 4 June 1943. The train was hauled by a steam locomotive, A^{B} 782, and consisted of seven passenger carriages, a guard's van and two wagons of time-sensitive freight. 4 June was a Friday and was to be followed by the King's Birthday long weekend, which boosted patronage to 113 as many passengers travelled to the Winter Show in Dunedin or horse races in Wingatui.

Prior to the accident, some passengers became concerned about their safety. Regular commuters were aware that the train was travelling at excessive speed and one who had moved from his seat to stand with friends in another carriage was forced to return to his seat as the movement of the train made it uncomfortable to stand. In the minutes immediately preceding the accident, luggage and parcels fell from racks above the seats.

== Accident ==
"It is safe to say that no previous railway accident in this country
has resulted in such a mass of distorted and wrecked rolling stock."

— Board of Inquiry

The disaster occurred at 1:45 pm when the express failed to negotiate a 183 meter radius curve in a deep cutting known locally as Straw Cutting, shortly after crossing the Six Mile Creek between Hyde and the Rock and Pillar Range. The train derailed, with the locomotive coming to rest against the side of the cutting 60 meters from where it derailed; the boiler burst, extinguishing the fire in the firebox but severely scalding the fireman. The carriages piled up around the locomotive; all seven passenger carriages had left the tracks, with the second overturning and coming to rest in front of the locomotive while four of the other carriages telescoped together. The guards van and two goods wagons at the rear failed to derail.

The force of the crash was such that the undercarriage of one was twisted into the form of a letter "S" and one passenger who survived was thrown out of their carriage, struck the side of the cutting, and bounced back in through another window. Bits of the train were scattered throughout the surrounding farmland and the cutting contained a mass of splintered wood, bent steel, and broken seats; an attending doctor described it as resembling "the result of a bomb blast".

Due to the remote location, it took approximately 90 minutes for rescuers to arrive. Reports reached Middlemarch of an accident where there "were possibly a few injuries" and medical personnel did not initially travel in a hurry to the disaster, but upon catching sight of the disaster from a rise in the road half a mile away, they proceeded swiftly. In the intervening time, the injured were tended by the passengers from the relatively undamaged rear carriages and by local farmer Pat Kinney, who owned the property through which the cutting ran; Kinney's son Frank had boarded the train at its last stop in Hyde and was one of the deceased. Some passengers were trapped in the wreckage for several hours and medical personnel – with the assistance of railway maintenance staff – worked until it was too dark to see.

== Casualties ==
Those killed were:

- Robert Carr (Sen.)
- William Carson
- Ethel Cassels
- Thomas Chisholm
- Frederick Christopher
- Thomas Clare
- Thomas Connor
- John Connor
- Charles Douglas
- John Frater
- Francis Kinney
- Duncan Lindsay
- Duncan Macdonald
- Daniel McDonald
- John Maskell
- Charles Mackenzie
- John O'Connell
- Irene White
- Desmond White
- John White
- John Wright

== Aftermath ==
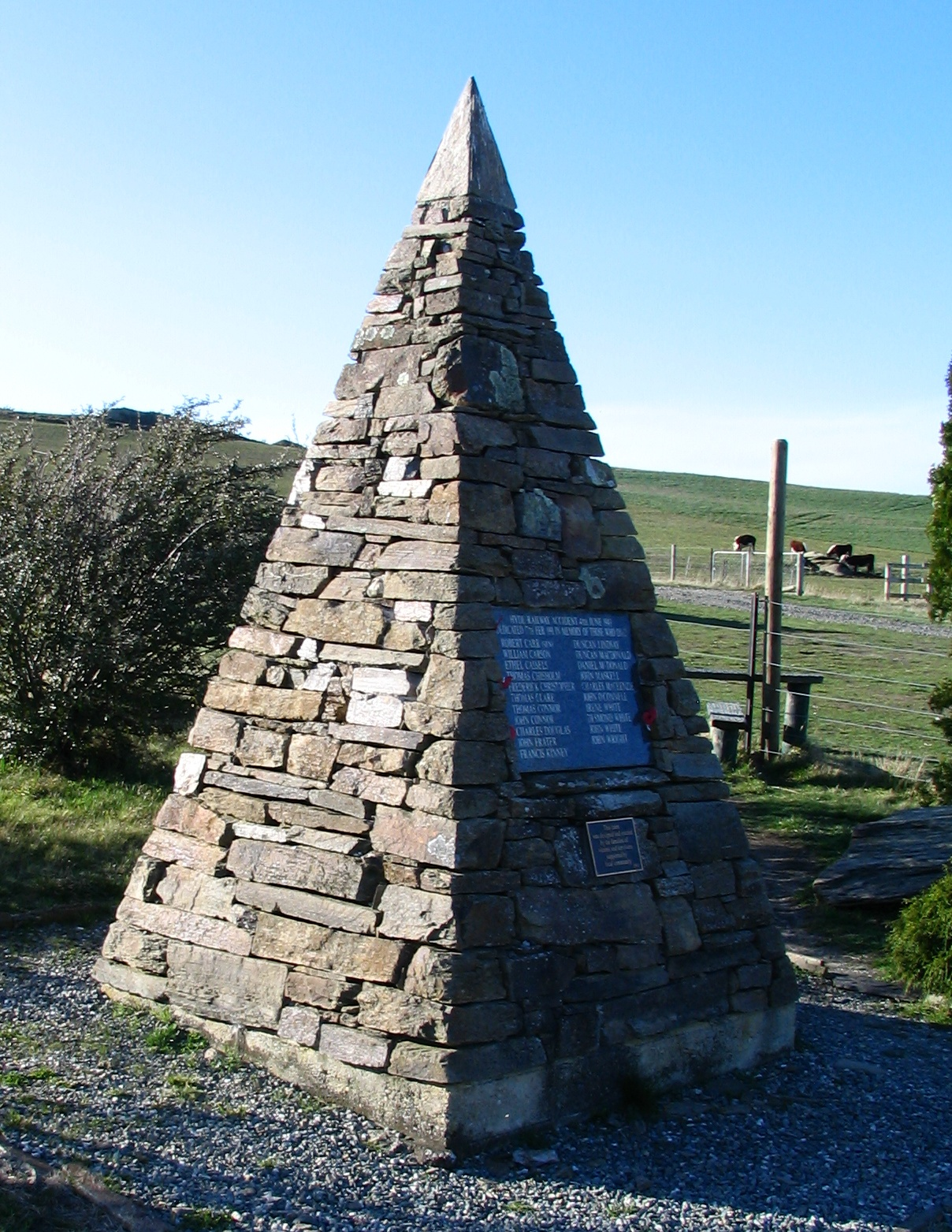
The cairn memorial "dedicated 17th Feb. 1991 in memory of those who died". It is beside State Highway 87 and the Otago Central Rail Trail, 7 km south of Hyde. A nearby plaque states "accident site 540 m north of this cairn"

The isolation of the disaster site was compounded by wartime conditions and little news was published of the accident. Relatives of the victims did not receive news of their loss until the next day.

A board of inquiry was established to investigate the accident. Based on the state of the wreckage, it found that the train had to be travelling in excess of 70 miles per hour (110 km/h) on a curve with a speed limit of 30 miles per hour (48 km/h) and had thus derailed due to the operation of centrifugal force. It found that the judgement of the driver, 55-year-old John Corcoran, was markedly impaired as he had been drunk, and thus charged him with serious dereliction of duty. Corcoran was tried in the Dunedin Supreme Court with manslaughter, found guilty, and sentenced to three years' jail. The train's guard was reprimanded for not taking action when he became aware of the train's excessive speed, but he was not criminally prosecuted.

In the years after the disaster, it had little legacy as it was overshadowed by World War II. When a memorial was established to victims of the Tangiwai disaster decades later, relatives of Hyde disaster victims began to work for their own memorial, led by Molly Winter and Elizabeth Coleman. In August 1990, a committee was formed to erect a monument, a 2.5 m high cairn, at an easily accessible site near the location of the derailment. The cutting of the disaster itself can also be walked, as the Otago Central Railway closed on 30 April 1990 and has been converted into the Otago Central Rail Trail.

The disaster was the only significant accident involving passengers that occurred on the Otago Central Railway between the start of construction in 1877 and closure.
