= David Teviotdale =

New Zealand museum director and archaeologist

David Teviotdale (1870–1958) was a New Zealand farmer, bookseller, ethnological collector, archaeologist, and museum director.

Teviotdale was born in Hyde, Central Otago, New Zealand in 1870.

He donated over 4000 items of worked stone, bone, and shell to the Otago Museum in 1924. In 1929 he began working at the Otago Museum, assisting the anthropology curator and continued his archaeological work at local Otago and national sites. His main interest was the material culture of early Māori settlers, particularly the moa hunters. His finds helped determine how many species of moa had lived in Otago.

In 1937, he was awarded the Percy Smith Medal by the University of Otago.

He died in 1958.
