= Hyde, New Zealand =

Town in Otago, New Zealand

Coordinates: 45°18′S 170°15′E

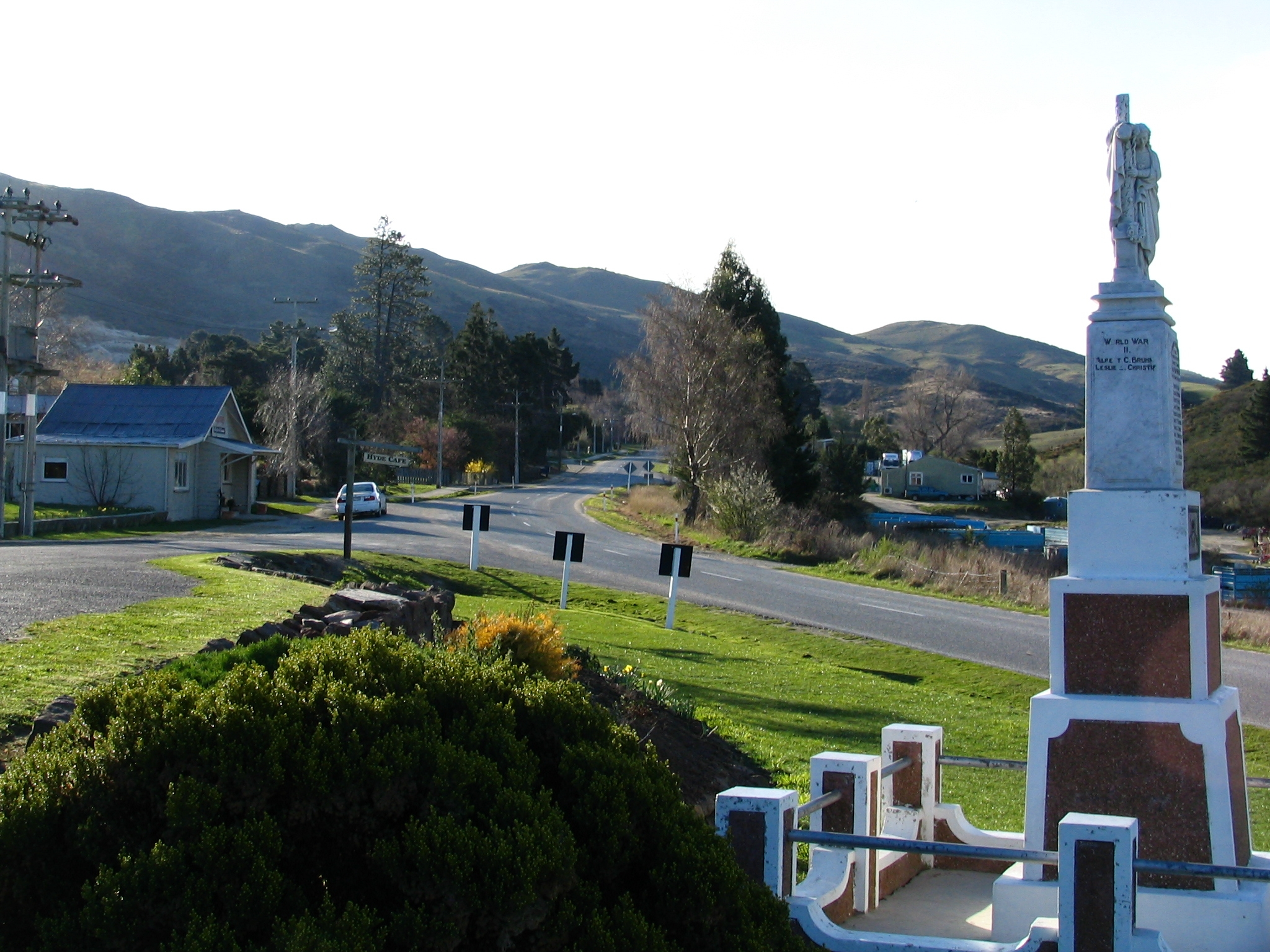
Looking north along State Highway 87 as it passes through Hyde

Hyde is a locality in Otago, New Zealand, located in the Strath-Taieri. It is close to the northern end of the Rock and Pillar Range on State Highway 87 between Middlemarch and Ranfurly. Hyde is best known as the site of the Hyde railway disaster of 4 June 1943, in which 21 people were killed when an express train on the Otago Central Railway derailed at high speed in a cutting near the town. At the time, it was the worst railway accident in New Zealand's history; it has only been passed by the Tangiwai disaster of 24 December 1953, which claimed the lives of 151 people. The site of the Hyde disaster can now be walked as part of the Otago Central Rail Trail and a monument, a 2.5 m high cairn, stands as a memorial to the victims.

== Name ==
Hyde was originally called Eight Mile as it was eight miles (13 km) south-east of the earlier Hamiltons gold field. It was renamed in honour of John Hyde Harris who was provincial superintendent of Otago from 1863 to 1865.

== History ==
This part of Maniototo was settled late due to its relative inaccessibility as the Taieri River could be dangerous in flood, and the Taieri Gorge was steep and in places impassable. As a result, the initial European settlement was in the form of large sheep runs such as Deep Dell, Highlay and Taieri Lake in the late 1850s.

=== Discovery of gold ===
In November 1861 it had identified that there may be gold in the area, and a small but payable field known as the Highlay Diggings was discovered in the winter of 1862 six miles to the east, midway between Hyde and Macraes. In August 1863 what become known as the Hyde district was included in gazetting of the Mount Ida Goldfield. In 1863 gold was also found at Hyde Gully and by 1864 the "Eight Mile rush" was in full swing. By the end of February 1864 the gold field had a population of 500. The good returns from Eight Mile led to the decline of the rush at Hamiltons.

The early mining settlement was built of calico (canvas), even the hotels and shops and was located about 1 mile (1.6 km) mile above the site of the present village.

The settlement grew with miners who were rapidly followed by shopkeepers and merchants. By June 1864 the population was close to 800. Another "rush" was made to Fullartons, then known as the Four-mile, because it lay four miles distant from Hyde. Sometime prior to the end of April 1864 the settlement was renamed Hyde.

By May 1864 the settlement had its own courthouse, which had been relocated from Hindon. In late August 1864 it was estimated that Hyde had a population of 1,200, of which 1,000 were miners whereas Hamilton's had 230 miners, 100 others; Hindon, 200 miners, 50 others; Sowburn, 80 miners, 20 others; Serpentine, 80 miners, 15 others; Fullarton's, 120 miners, 20 others; with another 800 scattered elsewhere in the district. Otago Witness, in December 1864, reported that Hyde "is remarkably lively, and seems to be in a state of excitement ana gaiety. Horse racing balls and suppers, almost every evening, make the town by far the more spirited place round about." At this time access to and from the central Otago goldfields was via either the Dunstan Road well to the south of Hyde, or the Pig Root to the north. The main connecting route for Hyde was with the isolated Macraes Flat gold field. Carrier Denny Daley in the mid-1860s established a trail between Macraes and Hyde, which was to later form the route of the modern road. A track was also established between the Pig Root and Hyde, via Macraes Flat.

Mining for gold continued but it was soon apparent as time advanced into 1865 that the district could not maintain a fossicking population as the richest finds were around 20 to 40 feet (6.1 to 12.2 m) underground. This required shafts needed to be dug or the sluicing by water jets of large amounts of soil. Already as early as about 1862 some miners had banded themselves into parties to construct water-races from the Rock and Pillar Range in order to provide the water needed for mining operations. However, it wasn't until 1864 that companies began to be formed in earnest and ground obtained under the Lease Act for sluicing (or hydraulicking as it was then called). The first water race brought on to the Hyde field was a very short one constructed from Price's Creek by Joseph Kelly and Alex Teviotdale. The second race was brought from the Little Capburn, or Catburn, as it was then called, by the Homeward Bound company. The Victorian Mining Company obtained the next water right and in 1864 constructed a 8 miles (13 km) long race which had its source in the upper reaches of the Three and Four Mile Creeks, between Hyde and Middlemarch.

The next right was granted to the McKay Bros, with Dr Alexander, of Dunedin, as a sleeping partner, and they constructed the race from the Three and Four Mile Creeks at a lower level than that of the Victorian. Later on the two companies amalgamated. James Bryant also obtained a right from the same creeks and constructed a race at a much lower level. The "Homeward Bound boys", as the miners called them, were responsible for the construction of another race called "The Enterprise" from the big Capburn. Miles of that race had to be built out of sluice boxes fastened along the sides of precipitous cliffs, which required Thomas Griffiths to undertake most of the work from slings lowered from the overhanging cliffs. The next race was by the Sowburn Co, which as it consisted of Irishmen was usually known as "The Kerry Boys". By such combinations about twelve races were constructed to bring water to the extensive gold workings which were now being worked. The operations of the sluicing companies which often came into conflict with farming interests soon led to plenty of litigation which lead to the settlement acquiring considerable notoriety. With the easy pickings gone a great number of the independent miners left to follow rushes to Macraes (better known as Fullartons), Hogburn and elsewhere in Otago or the West Coast. By the middle of 1865 the gold field was no longer worked by windlass and bucket with the availability of water, sluicing in full operation.

By late September 1865 the settlement had been reduced to a population of 120 to 150 with two hotels, Jones's Provincial, and Payne's Royal Mail, a butcher's shop (McQueen Bros), two stores (Robert Glenns and Bremner Bros), a bakery (operated by B. O'Dowd), shoemakers J. Bourke and J. Eccles and a Post Office. As the mining companies offered steady employment most of the remaining population had made up their mind to settle down with a number of half and quarter-acres of ground under cultivation, and with good substantial dwellings in each enclosure.

=== Development of agriculture ===
Compared with the stoney land at Hamilton's, Hyde had a rolling hills and a fertile river valley, which lead those miners who intended to remain in New Zealand, and could see that mining must eventually give way to settlement, to agitate for the cutting up of the sheep runs, The settlement's first farmer was William Price, familiarly known as "Old Price", who had squatted on a piece of land just outside the township, where he grazed 100 head of cattle, grew vegetables and potatoes and also supplied customers with milk. By 1869 the population was still chiefly engaged in mining pursuits; but by combining gardening operations they manage to knock out a pretty comfortable living. However, there were calls for the Government to be asked to open a block for agricultural settlement. There were also calls for a school district to be established as 25 families had taken up permanent residence in the area.

By the large 1860s a number of land seekers, farmers and other small settlers were ardently advocating for land to be made for settlement. The land surrounding Hyde was owned either by the government with large pastoralists having the right to graze sheep on what was called a "run". In many cases the runholder owned the land. The runholders naturally did not wish their runs broken up. The holder of the Taieri Lake sheep run was D. F. Main who was stern and relentless in his opposition, being reported as saying "if you want land to farm go to Mataura for it". The runholders were strongly supported by many of the miners (led by Michael and Thomas Duffy) – some to gain favour, and others because they thought that the owners of these smaller land holdings would be prejudiced against their interests and lock up potential gold rich areas. The introduction of the Waste Management Act of 1872 which was sponsored by Donald Reid was the first liberal Land Act in New Zealand and assisted settlers onto Crown land by offering a deferred payment settlement system. Under this scheme settlers took up land on terms which required only a small deposit and certain improvements; further payments were deferred until the settler was better established.

Under the deferred-payment provisions of this Act the first block of land (known as Maungatua) in the Hyde district was cut up with the first blocks going to John Dowling, Charles McLean, Rev. H. Flamank, William Dowling, William Price, and later on John Bruhns and James Heaney. The next block of land was taken from the Deep Dell run which was on the other side of the Taieri River. The next movement was an agitation for the cutting up of D. F. Main's Taieri Lake sheep run. This run which covered about 45,800 acres extended throughout Strath Taieri to the lake of the same name and carried about 35,000 sheep. Main slipped in and took his pre-emptive right first, and reserved that a parcel of land on which the Hyde railway stands. He also managed to get the portion of his run extending downwards declared an education reserve, and thus effectually blocked the people from any further encroachment. Eventually all the land from Hyde to Patearoa was cut up for settlement.

To improve access to the area more formal roads were constructed during the 1870s. To access the site of what is the modern township travellers had to use two dangerous fords, one on either side of the township where Kokonga is today, the site of Taieri Lake Station and the other at Mardlings Flat, a mile below Hyde. While the Kyeburn was a particularly dangerous stream when in flood, it was never swollen for any length of time. The Taieri. on the contrary, would be dangerously high for weeks in the early spring. During the flood season, settlers would have to wait three or four weeks for supplies. In December 1873 a deputation of settlers called on James Macandrew, Superintendent of the province of Otago, to install a bridge. The Taieri River was first bridged at Hogburn Junction in 1874. By 1874 the Hyde Progress Committee was becoming increasingly impatient. At Mardlings Crossing on the Taieri three lives were lost in the three years prior to November 1876. Finally in response to years of public agitation the government commenced construction of a bridge over the Taieri in 1878 which opened in 1879.

As the pace of permanent settlement increased agitation began in the district in flavour of the construction of the Otago Central Railway to provide improved access. This railway line reached Hyde on 12 July 1894.

By the early 20th century as well as a railway station (with a post and telegraph office and refreshment room) the town was home to a hotel, public school, two stores, blacksmith's shop, and public hall. Catholics had the use of the Church of the Sacred Heart while other denominations used the schoolhouse as their place of worship. The settlement is now experiencing a rebirth as a stop for cyclists on the Otago Central Rail Trail.

== Economy ==
The economy is principally based around servicing the surrounding farms, though since the development of the Otago Central Rail Trail tourism has gained more importance for the community with many farming families having taken the opportunity to diversify their farming operations by providing accommodation for users of the rail trail. The Otago Central Hotel has been restored and today offers accommodation place and a cafe. The old Hyde School has been turned into a private lodge. The old Hyde Railway Station is also being redeveloped. Just north of Hyde a "white ball" clay deposit is mined to provide high-quality pottery clay. To the southeast of town a quarry produces schist rock used in landscaping and house building.

== Attractions / Amenities ==
=== Bridge on the Hyde-Macraes Road ===
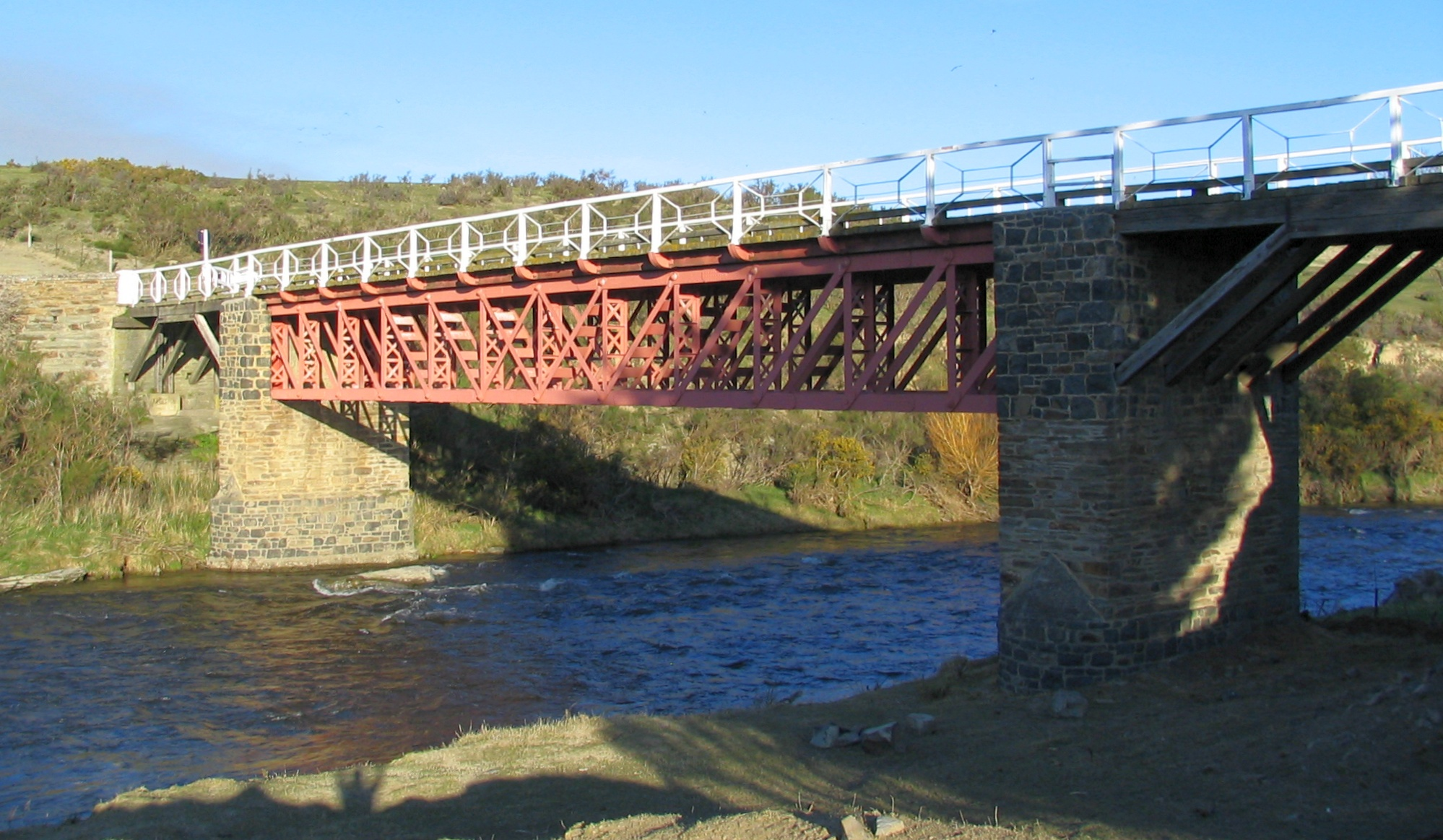
Bridge over the Taieri River

This bridge over the Taieri River was built in 1879 as the Taieri River could be dangerous in flood, leading to isolation of the upper Taieri area when fords became impassable. Following a number of years of public agitation this 160 feet (49 m) long iron lattice truss bridge designed by County Engineer Robert Browne was built in 1878–79. It was granted Heritage New Zealand historic place category 2 status in 2005.

=== Hyde Presbyterian Church ===
The Rev. D. M. Stuart from Dunedin conducted the first services in the area in 1864–65 when it was the northern most region of the Maungatua Parish and still only a gold camp. In 1886 the Rev. A. Bruce Todd was appointed to the Strath Taieri charge and commenced leading regular Presbyterian services in Hyde, which once the school was built were held in the school house before the Protestants of Hyde, like those of Naseby, erected an iron building similar to the Catholic church, which was also called the United Church of Hyde. Three ministers of all denominations used to visit Hyde from Waikouaiti, the Rev. Christie (Presbyterian), the Rev. Dasenit (Anglican), and the Rev. H. Flamank (Wesleyan). The Rev. Flamank was the first minister to settle permanently in the district. Laurence Mathewson was the first Sunday School teacher in Hyde.

A much superior brick church was finally built following a bequest of £360 from local farmer W. T. Persson, which together with a subsidy from the Synod allowed the residents to undertake the erection of the church. The architect was A. McGill of Dunedin. It was opened in March 1927 by the Governor General Sir Charles Fergusson. The church is home to two fine stained glass windows dedicated to Mr and Mrs Persson and to Thomas Ramsay.

Services are no longer held in the church.

=== Catholic Church of the Sacred Heart of Jesus ===
This simple yet graceful Gothic Revival style country church is located on the corner of 9137 Eton Street (State Highway 87) and Woburn Street. Father Royer, a popular French Catholic priest was the first Roman Catholic clergyman, if not the first clergyman of any denomination to visit Hyde in the early 1860s. A Roman Catholic church in the form of an iron shack was built at Hamiltons, and was blown down in a gale. In 1864 the Roman Catholics of Hyde bought the material, transported it over the ranges, and built it in a more substantial fashion, so that it did duty as a place, of worship. By the 1880s this building had become inadequate, which lead to services taking place in the parlour of the Commercial Hotel and at the school. In 1889, Hyde became part of the Palmerston parish and its priest, Father Donnelly commenced a campaign to build a new Catholic church in Hyde. Eventually under his successor, Father O'Donnell the church was able to commission well-known architect Francis William Petre to design the building, which he produced a church in his characteristic style. While the belfry was constructed in Oamaru stone, local schist was used for the rest of the building as this was a common material in Central Otago, where timber was scarce. The foundation stone was laid in December 1893. The church was opened on Pentecost Sunday, 13 May 1894, having cost £630 to build.

In 1953 the Hyde district was transferred from the Palmerston parish to the Ranfurly parish, where it still remains. From the 1980s, mass was held fortnightly at Hyde.

Late in the twentieth century (possibly in the 1970s) the church was plastered inside and out to protect it from weather damage. This required strengthening of the foundations to accommodate the added weight of the plaster. The church was granted Heritage New Zealand historic place category 2 status in 2004. Sunday services are held twice a month and a vigil is kept on Christmas Eve.

=== Hyde railway station ===
Following the closing of the railway line in 1990, the station was purchased from the Railways Corporation by Richard Hay who used it as a crib, while at the same time outfitting it with heritage items and replica instruments that he began acquiring. In 2016 the station building and some of the original stock wagons were purchased by the Otago Central Rail Trail Trust for $124,000.

== Infrastructure ==
Due to insufficient flat ground in the original township when the Otago Central Railway line was built, the Hyde railway station complete with stationmaster's house, engine shed, the line's first locomotive shed and stockyards had to be located 2 kilometres (1.2 mi) to the south where there was sufficient flat land to on and offload wagons. In addition to the railway station there was a flag station called ("Hyde Township") close to the present Otago Central Hotel, at which all trains stopped to provide passengers with direct access to the township itself.

The railway line closed in 1990. The station was once very busy with railway wagons loaded with scheelite, pure white silica sand for glass making, schist rock used by builders, clay which was used to produce fine pottery by pottery works in Christchurch and Auckland.

The only road other than the state highway is named after one of the gold mining settlements first resident's Michael Prendergast, hence Prendergast Road.

== Education ==
Hyde's first schools were short-lived private institutions, but none lasted long. Among them was a night school conducted by David Syme at the end of 1869 but it only lasted for a few months on account of his leaving for new fields. A day school was started by Kate Gildea with about a dozen pupils, one of whom, Bessie McRae, walking to it from McRae's Ferry. It only lasted a short time until her she left to enter the estate of matrimony. Finally, in 1869, the Protestants placed the United Church at the disposal of the Provincial Education Department for use on week days as a school, and a subsidised teacher, Seymour K. Saunders was sent up. The people built a small residence, and an official public school began in Hyde with 22 pupils. Saunders was succeeded by F. G. Odell.

Eventually the school committee decided that the school needed better accommodation than the small iron church which having no ventilation was unbearably hot in summer, and very cold in winter. The committee were successful in building a new simple one room wooden school in 1879 on a site at 9125 Eton Street (State Highway 87). The school continued to grow, and by 1893 its one room was crowded with 80 pupils, which led to a second classroom being built on the northern side of the building in 1894 at a price of £191.

Although the school never grew beyond these two classrooms, various amenities were added in the twentieth century. In 1956 an ablution block was added, a welcome improvement on the long-drops which had been used up until that time. In addition to schooling, the building has been used for various community activities over the years. The role declined over the years to just four pupils by the time the school was closed at the end of 1999.

The school building was granted Heritage New Zealand historic place category 2 status in 2004.

== Notable people ==
- David Teviotdale (1870–1958), farmer, bookseller, ethnological collector, archaeologist and museum director
