= Hautapu River (Manawatū-Whanganui) =

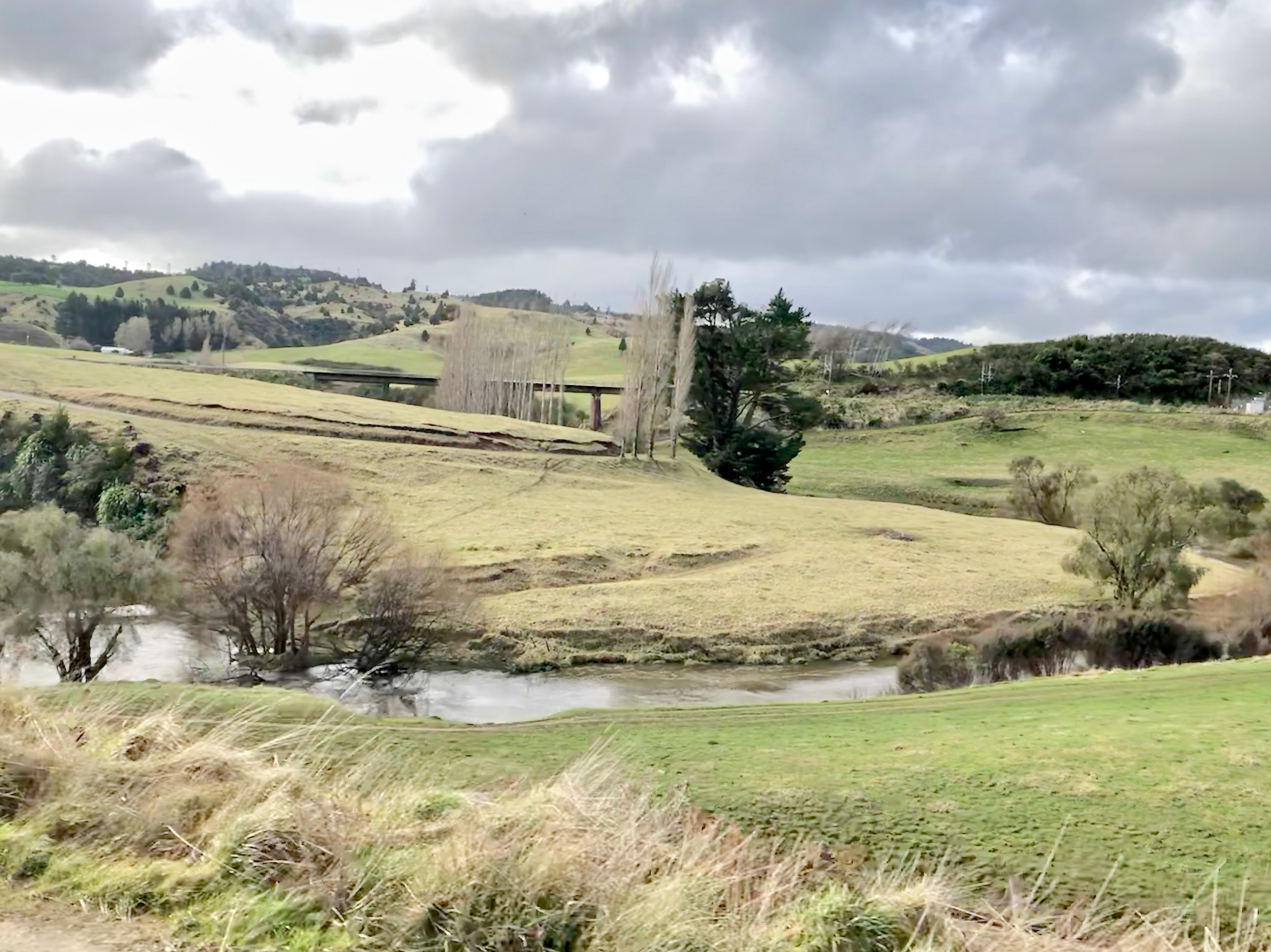
- Hautapu River near Turangarere

- Hautapu River location
- Native name: Hautapu (Māori)

Location
- Country: New Zealand
- Region: Manawatū-Whanganui
- Towns: Taihape

Physical characteristics
- Mouth
  - location: Rangitīkei River
  - coordinates: 39.7534°S 175.8366°E
- Length: 71 km (44 mi)

Basin features
- Progression: Hautapu River → Rangitīkei River
- River system: Rangitīkei River

The Hautapu River is a river in the Manawatū-Whanganui region of New Zealand. It originates east of the Ngamatea Swamp in the New Zealand Army's Waiouru Training area. From here it flows south, through private farmland, and in some places following State Highway 1, for several kilometres before entering the Rangitīkei River south of Taihape.

== Geography ==
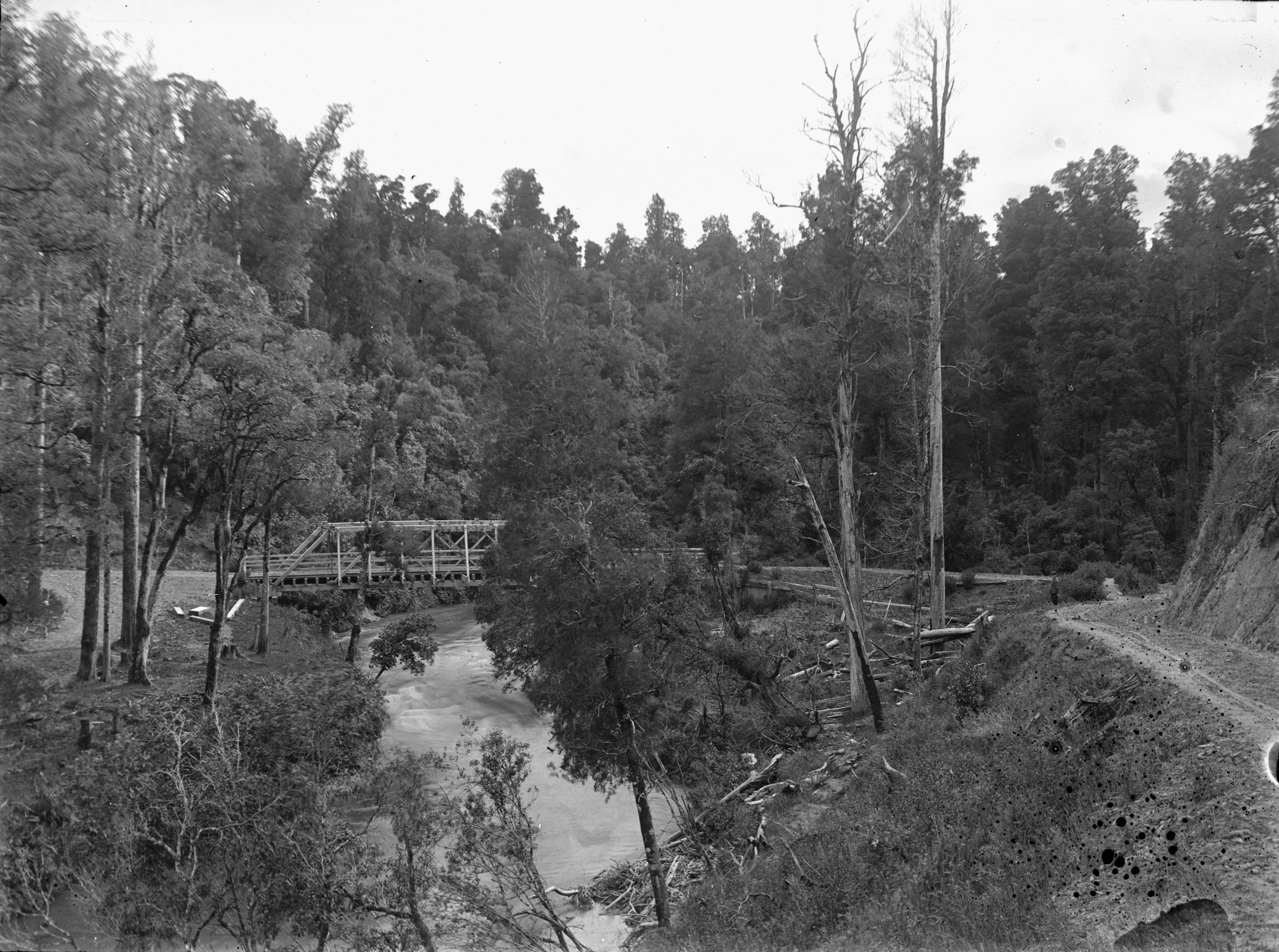
Bridge over the Hautapu River, 1906

The river has several waterfalls. In 1908 one was described as 15 feet (4.6 m) high, though a photograph from that era indicates it may be smaller.

For most of its length the river is closely followed by the North Island Main Trunk and is crossed twice by the railway. The river was diverted in 1905 to avoid the need for a further two railway bridges.

== Fishing ==
The Hautapu is well regarded as a trout fishing stream. In the summer months it can hold relatively good sized brown trout that can be targeted by either dry-fly or nymphing techniques. The river was restocked with brown trout in 1920.
