= Lake Road railway station =

Railway station in New Zealand

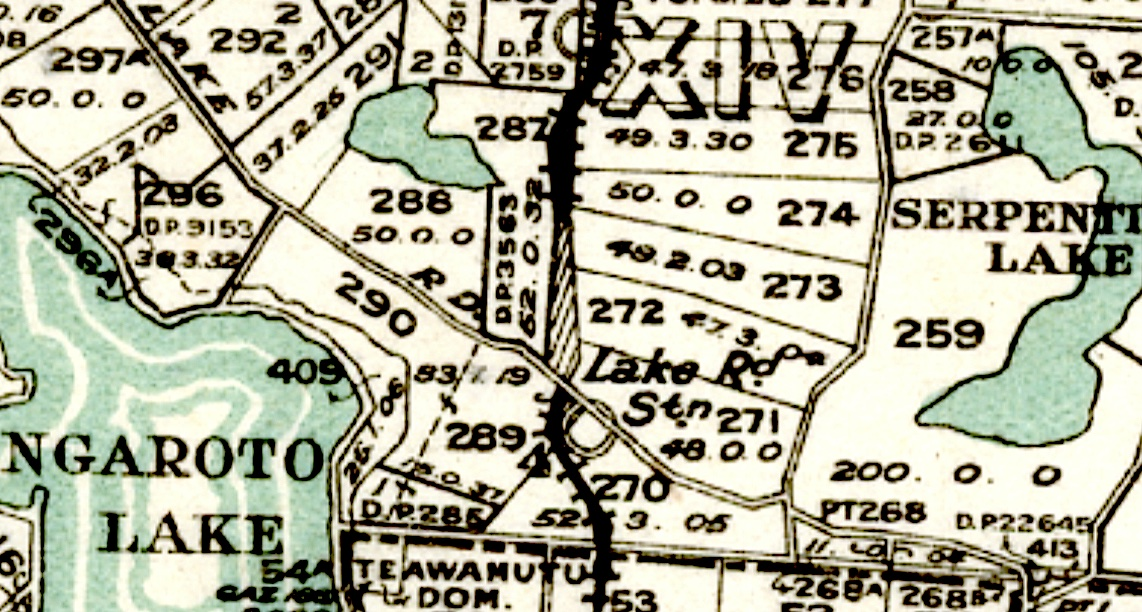
- Lake Road station on 1933 map

General information
- Location: New Zealand
- Coordinates: 37.951304°S 175.302916°E
- Elevation: 54 m (177 ft)
- Line: North Island Main Trunk
- Distance: Wellington 523.48 km (325.28 mi)

History
- Opened: 1 March 1881
- Closed: 7 July 1940
- Electrified: June 1988

Services
Preceding station	Historical railways	Following station
Ōhaupō; Line open station closed 3.68 km (2.29 mi)	North Island Main Trunk; KiwiRail	Ngaroto; Line open station closed 3.42 km (2.13 mi)
Location

Lake Road railway station was a flag station in the Waikato Region and on the North Island Main Trunk in New Zealand.

By February 1880 the contractor, Mr Fallon, had laid the rails from Ōhaupō to a point south of Lake Road. The line opened to Te Awamutu on Thursday 1 July 1880. Lake Road wasn't shown in the original timetable, but, in 1880, there was pressure from local farmers for a station between Ōhaupō and Ngaroto.

In October 1880 it was decided to open a 7th class station at Wrights Road, mid-way between Ōhaupō and Ngaroto. David Henderson won the contract for the station buildings in November 1880. The station first appeared in the 1 March 1881 timetable. By 1884 Lake Road had a shelter shed, platform and cart approach. Toilets were added in 1908, but there was also a complaint that the platform was only long enough for two coaches.

By 1911 it also had a loading bank. That year a man died when he'd not informed the guard that he wanted to get off at the flag station and fell from the moving train. In 1914 the 1 in 43 gradient at Lake Road was eased to 1 in 100, allowing train tonnages to be increased from a maximum of 209 to 494 tons.

On Sunday 7 July 1940 Lake Road closed to all traffic.
