= Ohaupo railway station =

Defunct railway station in New Zealand

Ōhaupō railway station
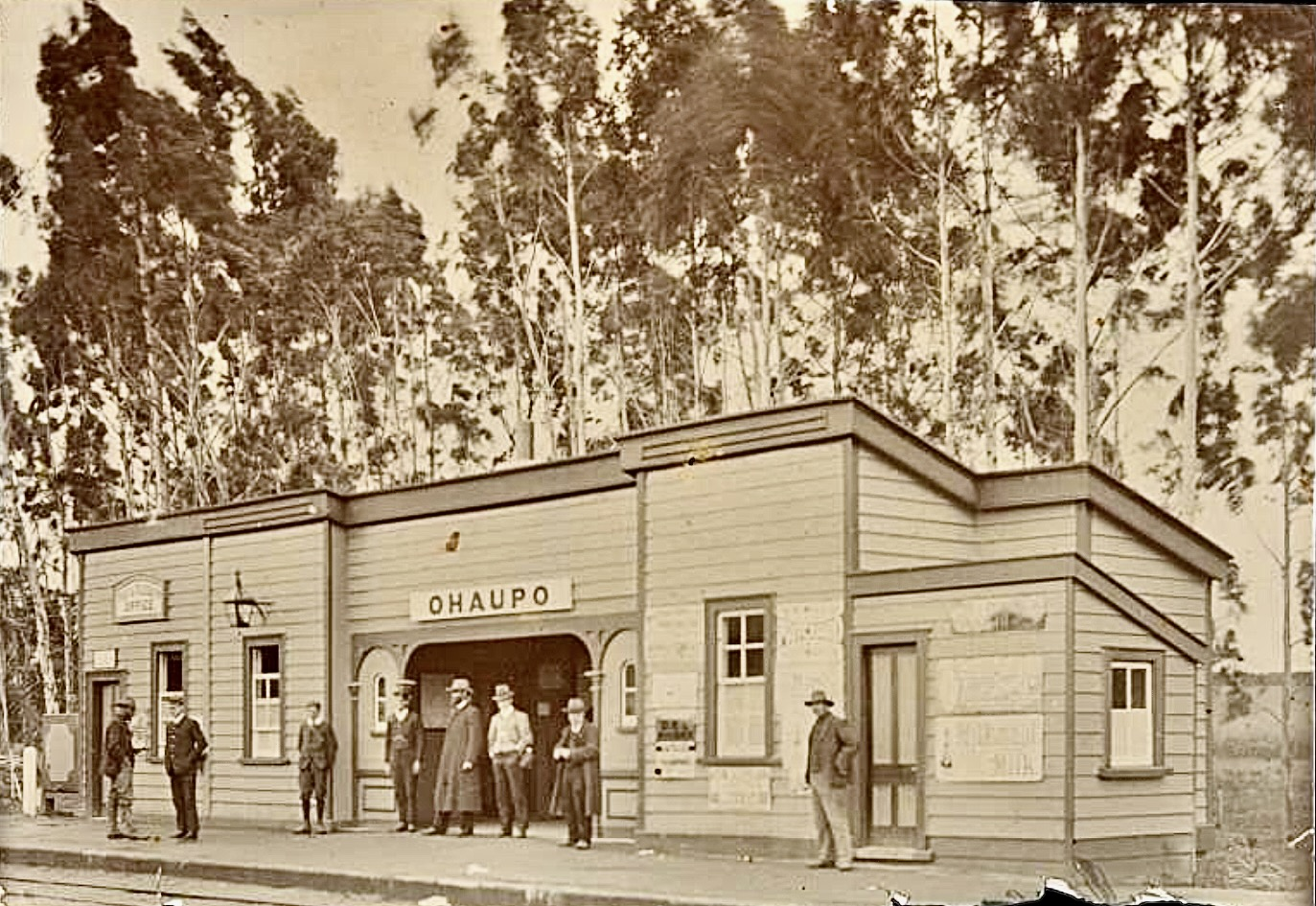
- Ōhaupō railway station in the 1880s

General information
- Location: New Zealand
- Coordinates: 37.921011°S 175.30283°E
- Elevation: 52 m (171 ft)
- Line: North Island Main Trunk
- Distance: Wellington 527.16 km (327.56 mi)

History
- Opened: 4 June 1878
- Closed: 13 June 1982
- Electrified: June 1988

Services
Preceding station	Historical railways	Following station
Rukuhia; Line open, station closed 6.68 km (4.15 mi)	North Island Main Trunk; KiwiRail	Lake Road; Line open, station closed 3.68 km (2.29 mi)
Location

Ōhaupō railway station was a station located at Ōhaupō on the North Island Main Trunk in New Zealand. It was the terminus of the line from Auckland from 1878 to 1880 and closed in 1982. Only a passing loop remains.

== History ==
Opening of the line from Hamilton to Ōhaupō had been planned for 25 February 1878, as a report on 13 February said it was ready to be opened. The Governor General went over the line on 27 March 1878, but, due to subsidence at Rukuhia, opening was postponed until 4 June 1878. The service started with two trains a day. A platelayer's cottage was built by July 1878 and the station and stationmaster's house by July 1879. From 1879 to 1913 there was a Post Office at the station. Trains were speeded up in 1879 to run at 20 mph (32 km/h) to Mercer and 25 mph (40 km/h) from there to Ōhaupō, saving about an hour.

On Thursday 1 July 1880 the line was extended to Te Awamutu and £397 was spent on moving the engine shed and driver's cottage there. By 1884 Ōhaupō had a 4th class station, passenger platform, cart approach to platform, 30 ft (9.1 m) by 60 ft (18 m) goods shed, loading bank, cattle yards, stationmaster's house, urinals and a passing loop for 37 wagons. By 1896 the goods shed had a verandah. By 1902 there was a ladies' waiting room, public vestibule, ticket lobby, stationmaster's office, an asphalt platform and a 7-room stationmaster's house. In 1905 the station was enlarged, a shelter added and a caretaker appointed. In 1909 a verandah was added and by 1911 the loop could hold 75 wagons. After the NIMT fully opened in 1909, Ōhaupō was served by local trains connecting with the expresses. By 1910 it had a staff of four and was open 19 hours a day. There were complaints about the station being on the far side of the tracks from Ōhaupō. Electric lights were installed in 1926. In 1927 the station handled 2,686 tons of fertiliser. In 1930 the stationmaster was replaced by a porter and Ōhaupō became a flag station. Two state houses were added in 1956. On Saturday 18 August 1956 Ōhaupō became an attended flag station. By 1980 the loop could hold 112 wagons. The station closed on Sunday 13 June 1982.

Traffic grew rapidly for the first two decades of the twentieth century, but then declined as buses and car increased (see graph and table below).

year	tickets	season tickets	staff	source	title
1881	2,020		1	https://paperspast.natlib.govt.nz/parliamentary/appendix-to-the-journals-of-the-house-of-representatives/1881/I/967	RETURN No. 9. Statement of Revenue and Expenditure of each Station for the Year ending 31 March 1881
1882	1,376		1	https://paperspast.natlib.govt.nz/parliamentary/appendix-to-the-journals-of-the-house-of-representatives/1882/I/824	RETURN No. 10. Statement of Revenue and Expenditure of each Station for the Year ending 31 March 1882
1883	1,403		1	https://paperspast.natlib.govt.nz/parliamentary/appendix-to-the-journals-of-the-house-of-representatives/1883/I/895	RETURN No. 10. STATEMENT of Revenue and Expenditure of each Station for the Year ended 31 March 1883
1884	1,402		1	https://paperspast.natlib.govt.nz/parliamentary/appendix-to-the-journals-of-the-house-of-representatives/1884/I/844	RETURN No. 10. STATEMENT of Revenue and Expenditure of each Station for the Twelve Months ending 31 March 1884
1885	1,057		1	https://paperspast.natlib.govt.nz/parliamentary/appendix-to-the-journals-of-the-house-of-representatives/1885/I/1156	RETURN No. 10. STATEMENT of Revenue and Expenditure of each Station for the Twelve Months ending 31 March 1885
1886	1,395	2	2	https://paperspast.natlib.govt.nz/parliamentary/appendix-to-the-journals-of-the-house-of-representatives/1886/I/1138	RETURN No. 10. STATEMENT of Revenue and Expenditure of each Station for the Twelve Months ending 31 March 1886
1887	1,313		1	https://paperspast.natlib.govt.nz/parliamentary/appendix-to-the-journals-of-the-house-of-representatives/1887/I/920	RETURN No. 10. STATEMENT of Revenue and Expenditure of each Station for the Twelve Months ending 31 March 1887
1888	866		1	https://paperspast.natlib.govt.nz/parliamentary/appendix-to-the-journals-of-the-house-of-representatives/1889/I/1068?large_image=true	RETURN No. 10. STATEMENT of Revenue and Expenditure of each Station for the Twelve Months ending 31 March 1888
1889	855		1	https://paperspast.natlib.govt.nz/parliamentary/appendix-to-the-journals-of-the-house-of-representatives/1889/I/1068	RETURN No. 10. STATEMENT of Revenue and Expenditure of each Station for the Twelve Months ending 31 March 1889
1890				https://paperspast.natlib.govt.nz/parliamentary/appendix-to-the-journals-of-the-house-of-representatives/1890/I/1064	RETURN No. 10. STATEMENT of Revenue and Expenditure of each Station for the Twelve Months ending 31 March 1890
1891	802		1	https://paperspast.natlib.govt.nz/parliamentary/appendix-to-the-journals-of-the-house-of-representatives/1891/II/1264	RETURN No. 10. STATEMENT of Revenue and Expenditure of each Station for the Twelve Months ending 31 March 1891
1892	819		1	https://paperspast.natlib.govt.nz/parliamentary/appendix-to-the-journals-of-the-house-of-representatives/1892/I/1164	RETURN No. 10. STATEMENT of Revenue and Expenditure of each Station for the Twelve Months ending 31 March 1892
1893	924		1	https://paperspast.natlib.govt.nz/parliamentary/appendix-to-the-journals-of-the-house-of-representatives/1893/I/1494	RETURN No. 10. STATEMENT of Revenue and Expenditure of each Station for the Twelve Months ending 31 March 1893
1894	993		1	https://paperspast.natlib.govt.nz/parliamentary/appendix-to-the-journals-of-the-house-of-representatives/1894/I/1388	RETURN No. 10. STATEMENT of Revenue and Expenditure of each Station for the Twelve Months ending 31 March 1894
1895	1,009		1	https://paperspast.natlib.govt.nz/parliamentary/appendix-to-the-journals-of-the-house-of-representatives/1895/I/1586	RETURN No. 10. STATEMENT of Revenue and Expenditure of each Station for the Twelve Months ending 31 March 1895
1896	1,005		1	https://paperspast.natlib.govt.nz/parliamentary/appendix-to-the-journals-of-the-house-of-representatives/1896/I/1624	RETURN No. 10. STATEMENT of Revenue and Expenditure of each Station for the Twelve Months ending 31 March 1896
1897	1,117		1	https://paperspast.natlib.govt.nz/parliamentary/appendix-to-the-journals-of-the-house-of-representatives/1897/II/1610	RETURN No. 12. STATEMENT of Revenue and Expenditure of each Station for the Year ended 31 March 1897
1898	1,108		1	https://paperspast.natlib.govt.nz/parliamentary/appendix-to-the-journals-of-the-house-of-representatives/1898/I/1670	RETURN No. 12. STATEMENT of Revenue and Expenditure of each Station for the Year ended 31 March 1898
1899	1,245		1	https://paperspast.natlib.govt.nz/parliamentary/appendix-to-the-journals-of-the-house-of-representatives/1899/I/1824	RETURN No. 12. STATEMENT of Revenue and Expenditure of each Station for the Year ended 31 March 1899
1900	1,139		1	https://paperspast.natlib.govt.nz/parliamentary/appendix-to-the-journals-of-the-house-of-representatives/1900/I/1612	RETURN No. 12. STATEMENT of Revenue and Expenditure of each Station for the Year ended 31 March 1900
1901					RETURN No. 12. STATEMENT of Revenue and Expenditure of each Station for the Year ended 31 March 1901
1902	2,059		2	https://paperspast.natlib.govt.nz/parliamentary/appendix-to-the-journals-of-the-house-of-representatives/1902/I/1436	RETURN No. 12. STATEMENT of Revenue and Expenditure of each Station for the Year ended 31 March 1902
1903	2,386	2	2	https://paperspast.natlib.govt.nz/parliamentary/appendix-to-the-journals-of-the-house-of-representatives/1903/I/1873	RETURN No. 12. STATEMENT of Revenue and Expenditure of each Station for the Year ended 31 March 1903
1904	3,180		3	https://paperspast.natlib.govt.nz/parliamentary/appendix-to-the-journals-of-the-house-of-representatives/1904/I/1848	RETURN No. 12. STATEMENT of Revenue and Expenditure of each Station for the Year ended 31 March 1904
1905	3,351	8	3	https://paperspast.natlib.govt.nz/parliamentary/appendix-to-the-journals-of-the-house-of-representatives/1905/I/3767	RETURN No. 12. STATEMENT of Revenue and Expenditure of each Station for the Year ended 31 March 1905
1906	3,367	17	3	https://paperspast.natlib.govt.nz/parliamentary/appendix-to-the-journals-of-the-house-of-representatives/1906/II/1600	RETURN No. 12. STATEMENT of Revenue and Expenditure of each Station for the Year ended 31 March 1906
1907	3,310	28	3	https://paperspast.natlib.govt.nz/parliamentary/appendix-to-the-journals-of-the-house-of-representatives/1907/I/2542	RETURN No. 12. STATEMENT of Revenue and Expenditure of each Station for the Year ended 31 March 1907
1908	4,285	43	3	https://paperspast.natlib.govt.nz/parliamentary/appendix-to-the-journals-of-the-house-of-representatives/1908/I/2061	RETURN No. 12. STATEMENT of Revenue and Expenditure of each Station for the Year ended 31 March 1908
1909	4,689	29	4	https://paperspast.natlib.govt.nz/parliamentary/appendix-to-the-journals-of-the-house-of-representatives/1909/II/1832	RETURN No. 12. STATEMENT of Revenue and Expenditure of each Station for the Year ended 31 March 1909
1910	4,513	9	4	https://paperspast.natlib.govt.nz/parliamentary/appendix-to-the-journals-of-the-house-of-representatives/1910/I/2050	RETURN No. 12. STATEMENT of Revenue and Expenditure of each Station for the Year ended 31 March 1910
1911	4,491	9	4	https://paperspast.natlib.govt.nz/parliamentary/appendix-to-the-journals-of-the-house-of-representatives/1911/I/2497	RETURN No. 12. STATEMENT of Revenue and Expenditure of each Station for the Year ended 31 March 1911
1912	5,080	73	4	https://paperspast.natlib.govt.nz/parliamentary/appendix-to-the-journals-of-the-house-of-representatives/1912/II/2420	RETURN No. 12. STATEMENT of Revenue and Expenditure of each Station for the Year ended 31 March 1912
1913	5,462	114	4	https://paperspast.natlib.govt.nz/parliamentary/appendix-to-the-journals-of-the-house-of-representatives/1913/I/3693	RETURN No. 12. STATEMENT of Revenue and Expenditure of each Station for the Year ended 31 March 1913
1914	5,359	117		https://paperspast.natlib.govt.nz/parliamentary/appendix-to-the-journals-of-the-house-of-representatives/1914/I/2031	RETURN No. 12. Statement of Revenue for each Station for the Year ended 31 March 1914
1915	5,670	132		https://paperspast.natlib.govt.nz/parliamentary/appendix-to-the-journals-of-the-house-of-representatives/1915/I/1638	RETURN No. 12. Statement of Revenue for each Station for the Year ended 31 March 1915
1916	5,108	107		https://paperspast.natlib.govt.nz/parliamentary/appendix-to-the-journals-of-the-house-of-representatives/1916/I/1053	RETURN No. 12. Statement of Revenue for each Station for the Year ended 31 March 1916
1917	5,551	159		https://paperspast.natlib.govt.nz/parliamentary/appendix-to-the-journals-of-the-house-of-representatives/1917/I/1123	RETURN No. 12. Statement of Revenue for each Station for the Year ended 31 March 1917
1918	5,423	115		https://paperspast.natlib.govt.nz/parliamentary/appendix-to-the-journals-of-the-house-of-representatives/1918/I-II/1159	RETURN No. 12. Statement of Revenue for each Station for the Year ended 31 March 1918
1919	6,324	133		https://paperspast.natlib.govt.nz/parliamentary/appendix-to-the-journals-of-the-house-of-representatives/1919/I/1231	RETURN No. 12. Statement of Revenue for each Station for the Year ended 31 March 1919
1920	6,516	90		https://paperspast.natlib.govt.nz/parliamentary/appendix-to-the-journals-of-the-house-of-representatives/1920/I/1349	RETURN No. 12. Statement of Revenue for each Station for the Year ended 31 March 1920
1921	6,351	92		https://paperspast.natlib.govt.nz/parliamentary/appendix-to-the-journals-of-the-house-of-representatives/1921/I-II/1452	RETURN No. 12. Statement of Revenue for each Station for the Year ended 31 March 1921
1922	5,706	27		https://paperspast.natlib.govt.nz/parliamentary/appendix-to-the-journals-of-the-house-of-representatives/1922/I/1409	RETURN No. 12. Statement of Revenue for each Station for the Year ended 31 March 1922
1923	5,638	33		https://paperspast.natlib.govt.nz/parliamentary/appendix-to-the-journals-of-the-house-of-representatives/1923/I-II/1321	RETURN No. 12. Statement of Revenue for each Station for the Year ended 31 March 1923
1924	5,455	56		https://paperspast.natlib.govt.nz/parliamentary/appendix-to-the-journals-of-the-house-of-representatives/1924/I/2458	RETURN No. 12. Statement of Revenue for each Station for the Year ended 31 March 1924
1925	4,658	73		https://paperspast.natlib.govt.nz/parliamentary/appendix-to-the-journals-of-the-house-of-representatives/1925/I/1804	RETURN No. 12. Statement of Traffic and Revenue for each Station for the Year ended 31 March 1925
1926	4,602	49		https://paperspast.natlib.govt.nz/parliamentary/appendix-to-the-journals-of-the-house-of-representatives/1926/I/1930	STATEMENT No. 18 Statement of Traffic and Revenue for each Station for the Year ended 31 March 1926
1927	3,804	69		https://paperspast.natlib.govt.nz/parliamentary/appendix-to-the-journals-of-the-house-of-representatives/1927/I/2230	STATEMENT No. 18 Statement of Traffic and Revenue for each Station for the Year ended 31 March 1927
1928	3,231	175		https://paperspast.natlib.govt.nz/parliamentary/appendix-to-the-journals-of-the-house-of-representatives/1928/I/2628	STATEMENT No. 18 Statement of Traffic and Revenue for each Station for the Year ended 31 March 1928
1929	2,242	181		https://paperspast.natlib.govt.nz/parliamentary/appendix-to-the-journals-of-the-house-of-representatives/1929/I/2090	STATEMENT No. 18 Statement of Traffic and Revenue for each Station for the Year ended 31 March 1929
1930	1,725	176		https://paperspast.natlib.govt.nz/parliamentary/appendix-to-the-journals-of-the-house-of-representatives/1930/I/2212	STATEMENT No. 18 Statement of Traffic and Revenue for each Station for the Year ended 31 March 1930
1931	1,843	157		https://paperspast.natlib.govt.nz/parliamentary/appendix-to-the-journals-of-the-house-of-representatives/1931/I-II/1778	STATEMENT No. 18 Statement of Traffic and Revenue for each Station for the Year ended 31 March 1931
1932	1,975	177		https://paperspast.natlib.govt.nz/parliamentary/appendix-to-the-journals-of-the-house-of-representatives/1932/I-II/1934	STATEMENT No. 18 Statement of Traffic and Revenue for each Station for the Year ended 31 March 1932
1933	2,354	135		https://paperspast.natlib.govt.nz/parliamentary/appendix-to-the-journals-of-the-house-of-representatives/1933/I/1388	STATEMENT No. 18 Statement of Traffic and Revenue for each Station for the Year ended 31 March 1933
1934	2,539	135		https://paperspast.natlib.govt.nz/parliamentary/appendix-to-the-journals-of-the-house-of-representatives/1934/I/2278	STATEMENT No. 18 Statement of Traffic and Revenue for each Station for the Year ended 31 March 1934
1935	2,759	135		https://paperspast.natlib.govt.nz/parliamentary/appendix-to-the-journals-of-the-house-of-representatives/1935/I/1326	STATEMENT No. 18 Statement of Traffic and Revenue for each Station for the Year ended 31 March 1935
1936	2,576	113		https://paperspast.natlib.govt.nz/parliamentary/appendix-to-the-journals-of-the-house-of-representatives/1936/I/1552	STATEMENT No. 18 Statement of Traffic and Revenue for each Station for the Year ended 31 March 1936
1937	1,935	105		https://paperspast.natlib.govt.nz/parliamentary/appendix-to-the-journals-of-the-house-of-representatives/1937/I/1896	STATEMENT No. 18 Statement of Traffic and Revenue for each Station for the Year ended 31 March 1937
1938	2,024	135		https://paperspast.natlib.govt.nz/parliamentary/appendix-to-the-journals-of-the-house-of-representatives/1938/I/1652	STATEMENT No. 18 Statement of Traffic and Revenue for each Station for the Year ended 31 March 1938
1939	2,071	116		https://paperspast.natlib.govt.nz/parliamentary/appendix-to-the-journals-of-the-house-of-representatives/1939/I/1970	STATEMENT No. 18 Statement of Traffic and Revenue for each Station for the Year ended 31 March 1939
1940	1,764	119		https://paperspast.natlib.govt.nz/parliamentary/appendix-to-the-journals-of-the-house-of-representatives/1940/I/1314	STATEMENT No. 18 Statement of Traffic and Revenue for each Station for the Year ended 31 March 1940
1941	1,376	117		https://paperspast.natlib.govt.nz/parliamentary/appendix-to-the-journals-of-the-house-of-representatives/1941/I/1203	STATEMENT No. 18 Statement of Traffic and Revenue for each Station for the Year ended 31 March 1941
1942	2,056	127		https://paperspast.natlib.govt.nz/parliamentary/appendix-to-the-journals-of-the-house-of-representatives/1942/I/651	STATEMENT No. 18 Statement of Traffic and Revenue for each Station for the Year ended 31 March 1942
1943	3,544	133		https://paperspast.natlib.govt.nz/parliamentary/appendix-to-the-journals-of-the-house-of-representatives/1943/I/679	STATEMENT No. 18 Statement of Traffic and Revenue for each Station for the Year ended 31 March 1943
1944	2,269	88		https://paperspast.natlib.govt.nz/parliamentary/appendix-to-the-journals-of-the-house-of-representatives/1944/I/895	STATEMENT No. 18 Statement of Traffic and Revenue for each Station for the Year ended 31 March 1944
1945	1,508	19		https://paperspast.natlib.govt.nz/parliamentary/appendix-to-the-journals-of-the-house-of-representatives/1945/I/969	STATEMENT No. 18 Statement of Traffic and Revenue for each Station for the Year ended 31 March 1945
1946	1,173	21		https://paperspast.natlib.govt.nz/parliamentary/appendix-to-the-journals-of-the-house-of-representatives/1946/I/1548	STATEMENT No. 18 Statement of Traffic and Revenue for each Station for the Year ended 31 March 1946
1947	1,004	5		https://paperspast.natlib.govt.nz/parliamentary/appendix-to-the-journals-of-the-house-of-representatives/1947/I/2495	STATEMENT No. 18 Statement of Traffic and Revenue for each Station for the Year ended 31 March 1947
1948	422	10		https://paperspast.natlib.govt.nz/parliamentary/appendix-to-the-journals-of-the-house-of-representatives/1948/I/2521	STATEMENT No. 18 Statement of Traffic and Revenue for each Station for the Year ended 31 March 1948
1949	609			https://paperspast.natlib.govt.nz/parliamentary/appendix-to-the-journals-of-the-house-of-representatives/1949/I/2104	STATEMENT No. 18 Statement of Traffic and Revenue for each Station for the Year ended 31 March 1949
1950	558			https://paperspast.natlib.govt.nz/parliamentary/appendix-to-the-journals-of-the-house-of-representatives/1950/I/2366	STATEMENT No. 18 Statement of Traffic and Revenue for each Station for the Year ended 31 March 1950

The New Zealand Ministry for Culture and Heritage gives a translation of "place of a breeze at night" for Ōhaupō.

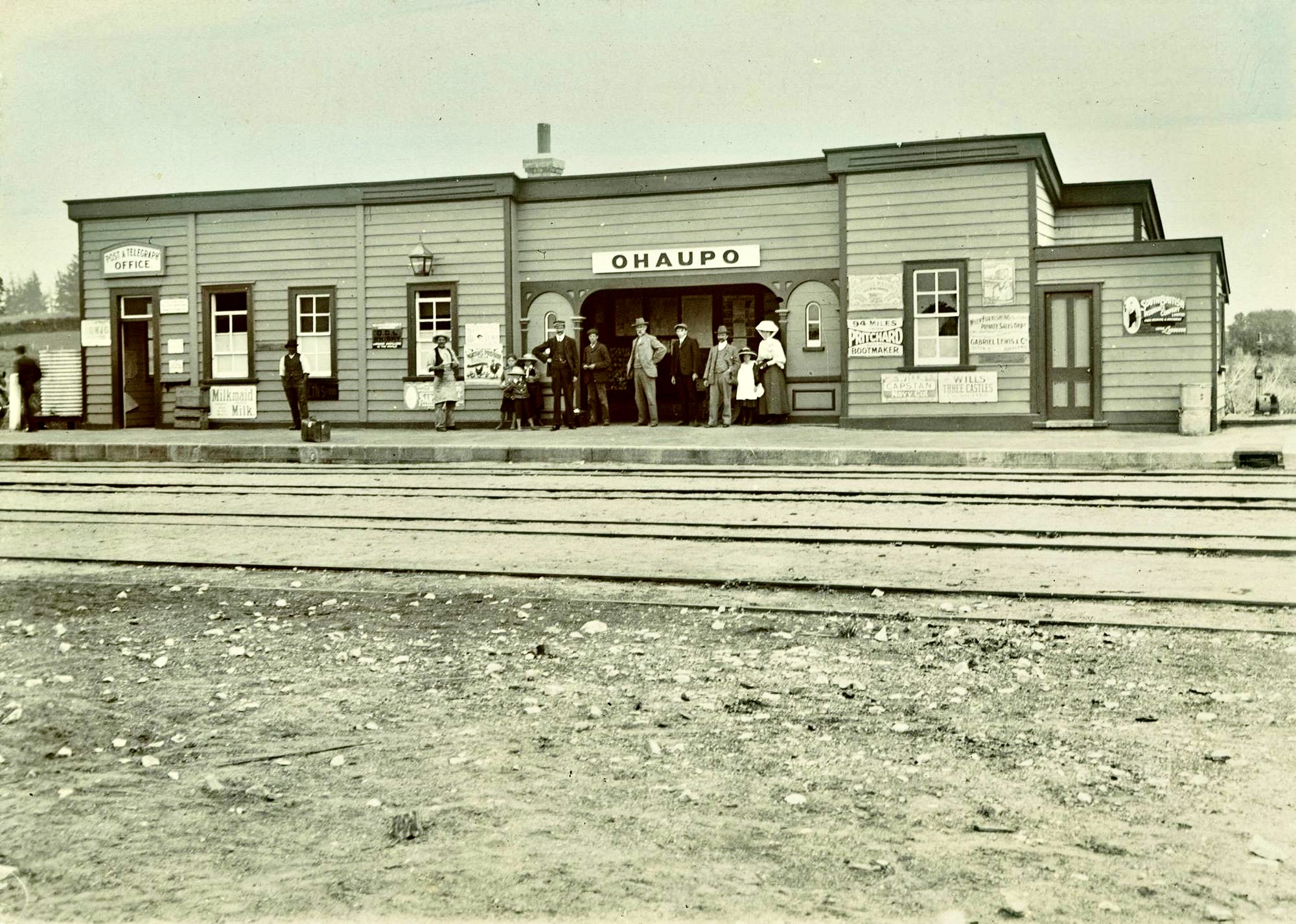
Ōhaupō railway station about 1908 (before the 1909 verandah)

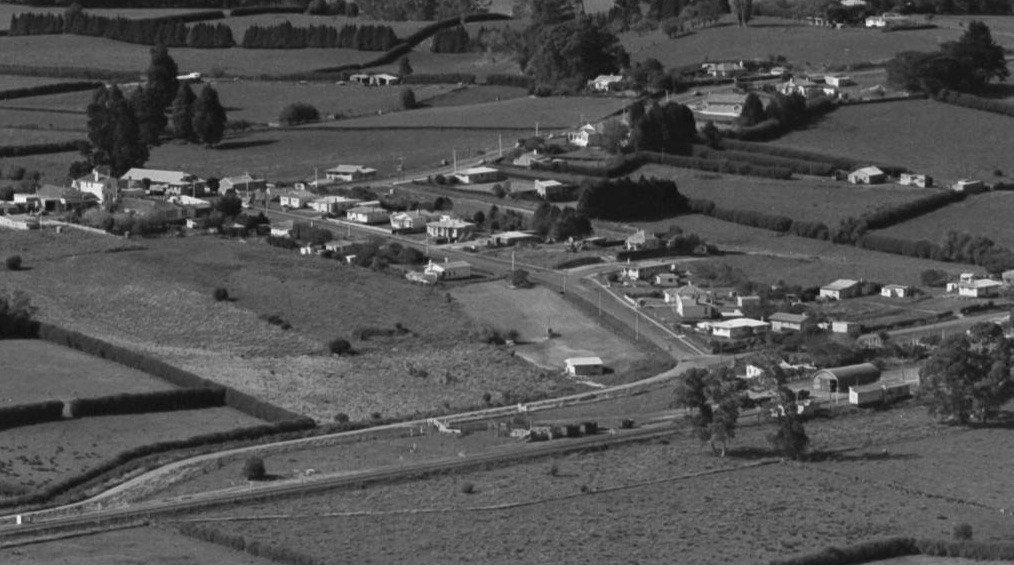
Aerial view of Ōhaupō in 1964 – station bottom right

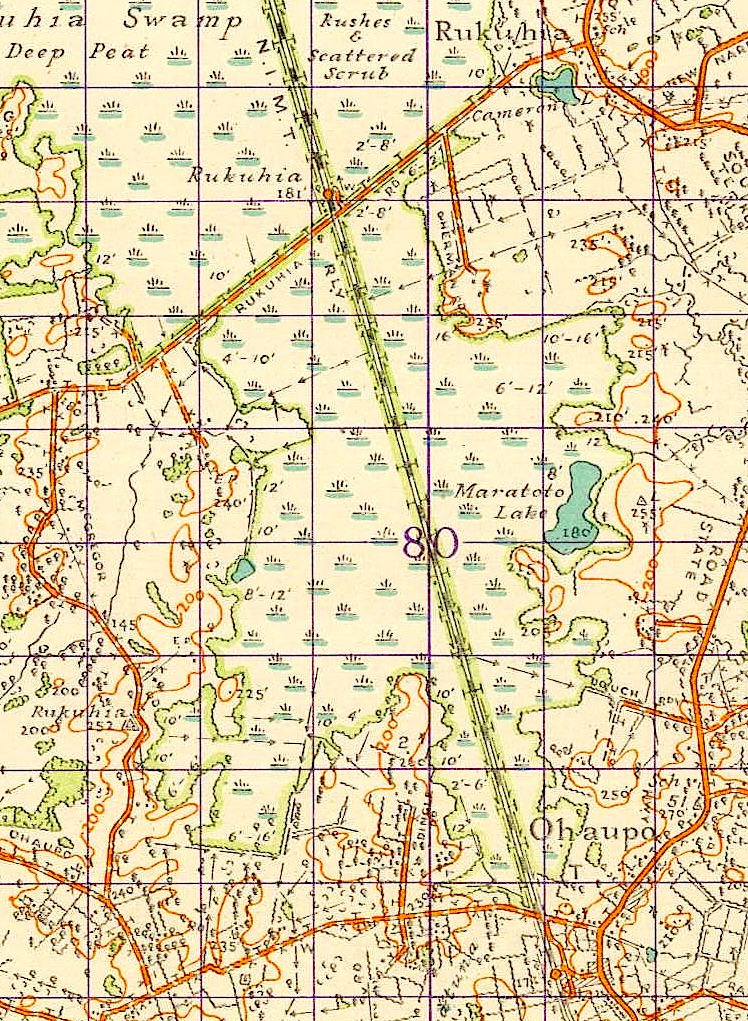
1946 one inch to one mile map

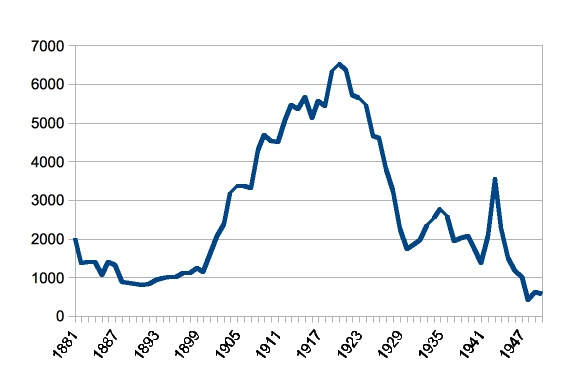
tickets sales 1881–1950 – derived from annual returns to Parliament of "Statement of Revenue for each Station for the Year ended"
