= Rukuhia railway station =

Railway station in New Zealand

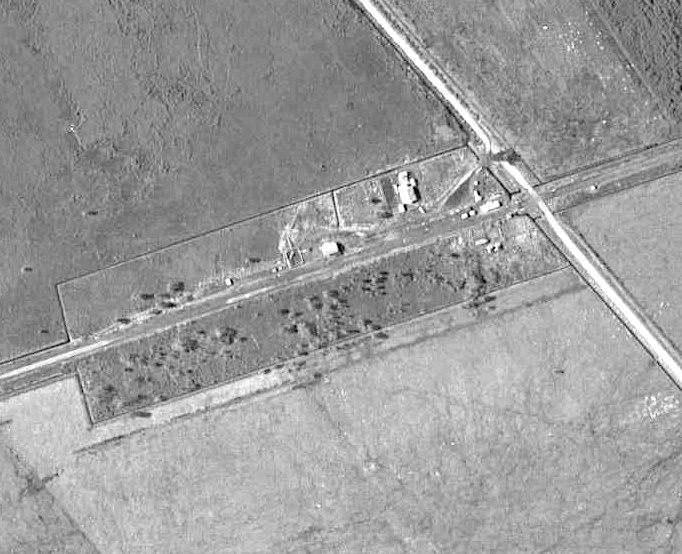
- Rukuhia in 1953

General information
- Location: Rukuhia; New Zealand
- Coordinates: 37.863606°S 175.28266°E
- Elevation: 55 m (180 ft)
- Line: North Island Main Trunk
- Distance: Wellington 533.84 km (331.71 mi)

History
- Opened: 4 June 1878
- Closed: 12 September 1971
- Electrified: June 1988

Services
Preceding station	Historical railways	Following station
Hamilton; Line open, station closed 8.45 km (5.25 mi)	North Island Main Trunk; KiwiRail	Ōhaupō; Line open, station closed 6.68 km (4.15 mi)
Location

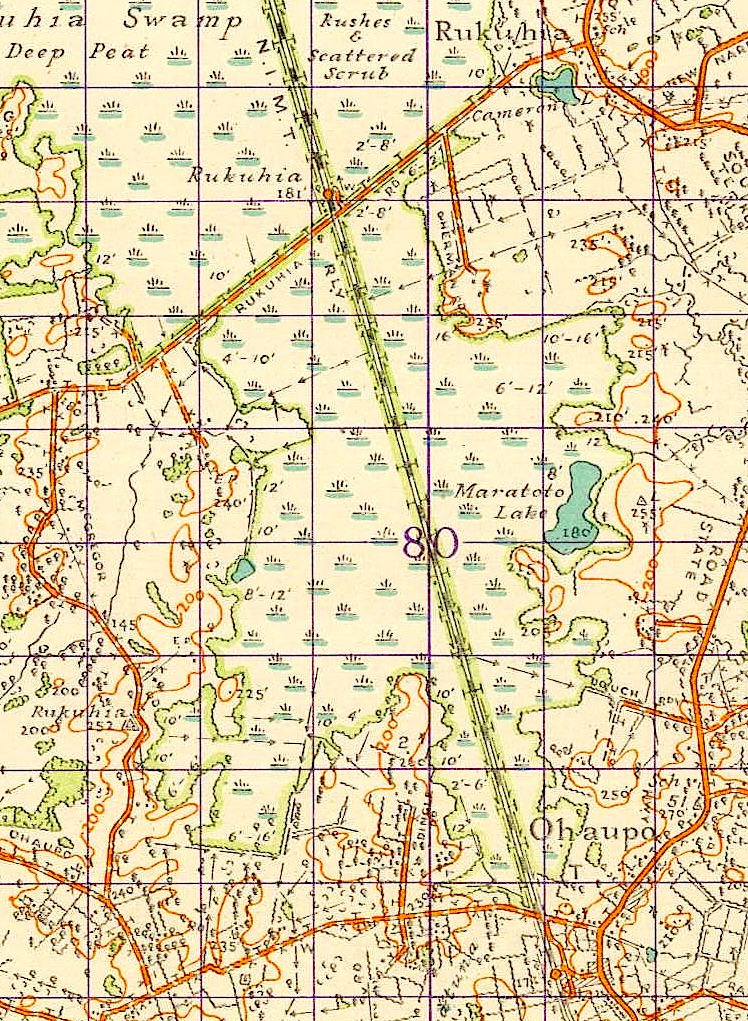
1946 one inch to one mile map (Source- Land Information New Zealand (LINZ) and licensed by LINZ for re-use under the Creative Commons Attribution 3.0 New Zealand licence)

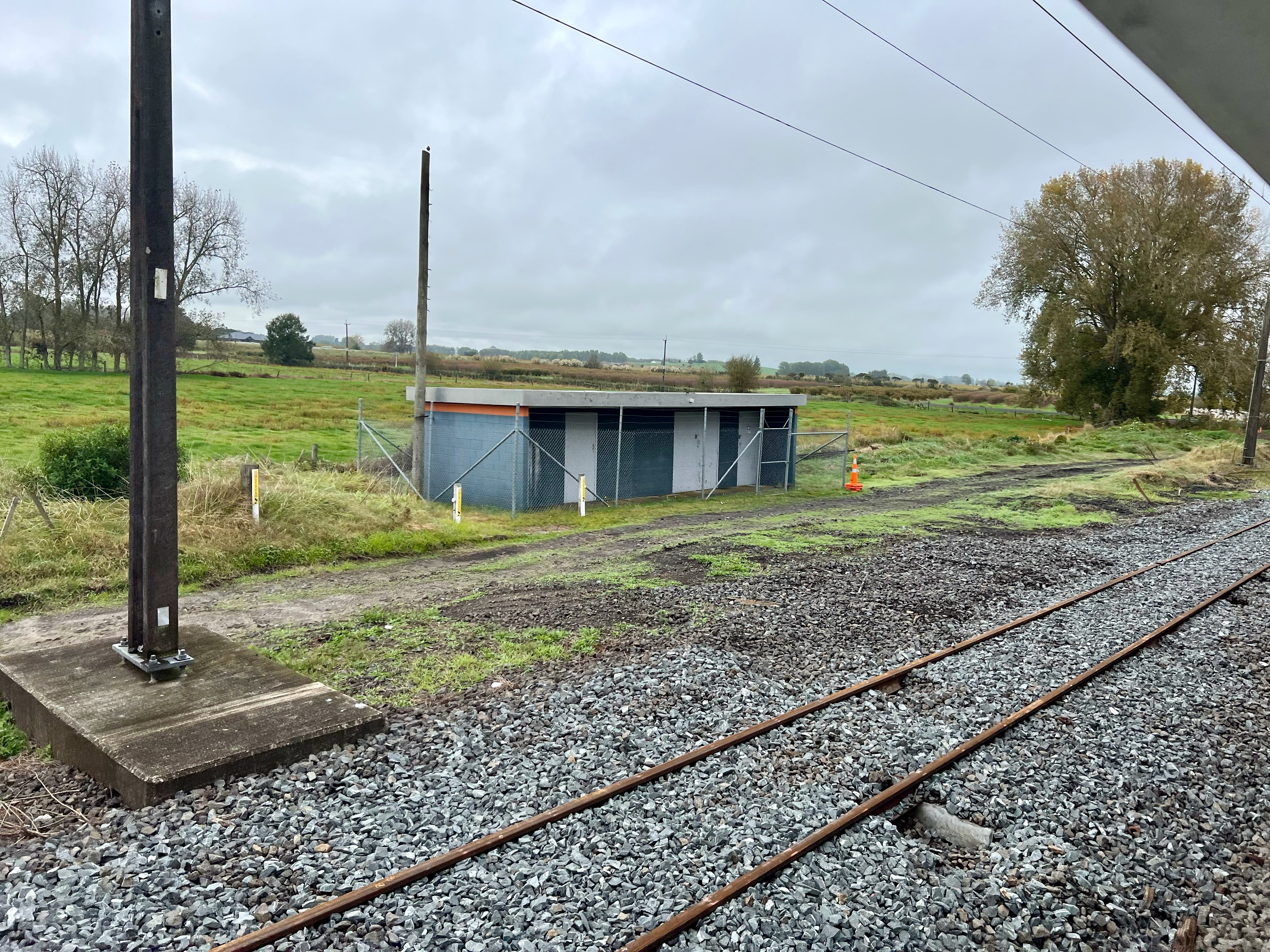
Rukuhia station site in 2023

Rukuhia railway station was a flag station on the North Island Main Trunk in New Zealand, located in the settlement of Rukuhia. It was established during an extension of the railway line in the 1870s. The service started with two trains a day.

Opening of the line from Hamilton to Ōhaupō was delayed by subsidence at Rukuhia. A service had been planned from 25 February 1878 and the Governor General went over the line on 27 March 1878, but opening was still postponed as large quantities of gravel were poured into a hole. The line finally opened on 4 June 1878. The station was surrounded by peat fires in 1935. A 1943 notice noted that owing to the danger of track subsidence, no engine must be allowed to remain stationary on the siding for any length of time. Tests in 1981 found that the track deformed by about 12mm each time a train went over it, due to the peat swamp.

A road to the station was formed in 1879, a siding in 1881, by 1882 it had a 5th class stationmaster's house and gatekeeper's house, by 1884 also a shelter shed, platform and a cart approach, 30 ft (9.1 m) by 20 ft (6.1 m) goods shed and, by 1896, it had cattle yards. A passing loop for 38 wagons was added in 1908 and sheep yards by 1911.

On 12 September 1971 Rukuhia closed to all traffic and only a passing loop remains.
