= Rukuhia =

Settlement in Waikato, New Zealand

- Village
- Interactive map of Rukuhia
- Coordinates: 37.852237°S 175.305961°E
- Country: New Zealand
- Region: Waikato
- District: Waipā District
- Ward: Pirongia Ward
- Electorates: Taranaki-King Country; Hauraki-Waikato (Māori)

Government
  - Territorial Authority: Waipā District Council
  - Regional council: Waikato Regional Council
  - Mayor of Waipa: Mike Pettit
  - Taranaki-King Country MP: Barbara Kuriger
  - Hauraki-Waikato MP: Hana-Rawhiti Maipi-Clarke

Area
  - Territorial: 0.45 km^{2} (0.17 sq mi)

Population (June 2025)
  - Territorial: 160
  - Density: 360/km^{2} (920/sq mi)
- Time zone: UTC+12 (NZST)
  - Summer (DST): UTC+13 (NZDT)

Rukuhia is a rural community in the Waipa District and Waikato region of New Zealand's North Island.

It is located just south of the Hamilton suburb of Glenview, west of the Waikato District town of Tamahere and north of the Waipa towns of Ōhaupō and Te Awamutu, on State Highway 3.

The area includes several farms on the flat between the Rukuhia Swamp and the Waikato River, and the Hamilton Airport industrial area.

Rukuhia translates as 'gathered together, submerged or dived for'.

The Rukuhia School First World War Memorial was unveiled in June 1923, on the sixth anniversary of the Battle of Messines. It is a tribute to the 22 men from Rukuhia who served in World War I, including the nine who were killed or who died of wounds, and nine others who were wounded but survived. The memorial was rededicated on Armistice Day in 2003.

The Rukuhia railway station was a station on the North Island Main Trunk in New Zealand, established during the extension of the railway line in the 1870s. Tests in 1981 found that the track deformed by about 12mm each time a train went over it, due to the peat swamp.

== Demographics ==
Statistics New Zealand describes Rukuhia as a rural settlement, which covers 0.45 km^{2} (0.17 sq mi). It had an estimated population of 160 as of June 2025, with a population density of 356 people per km^{2}. The settlement is part of the larger Lake Cameron statistical area.

Historical population for Rukuhia
Year	Pop.	±% p.a.
2006	123	—
2013	132	+1.01%
2018	159	+3.79%
2023	159	+0.00%

Rukuhia had a population of 159 in the 2023 New Zealand census, unchanged since the 2018 census, and an increase of 27 people (20.5%) since the 2013 census. There were 81 males and 78 females in 48 dwellings. 1.9% of people identified as LGBTIQ+. The median age was 36.4 years (compared with 38.1 years nationally). There were 48 people (30.2%) aged under 15 years, 15 (9.4%) aged 15 to 29, 78 (49.1%) aged 30 to 64, and 15 (9.4%) aged 65 or older.

People could identify as more than one ethnicity. The results were 88.7% European (Pākehā); 15.1% Māori; 3.8% Pasifika; 3.8% Asian; and 1.9% Middle Eastern, Latin American and African New Zealanders (MELAA). English was spoken by 96.2%, Māori language by 3.8%, Samoan by 1.9%, and other languages by 7.5%. No language could be spoken by 1.9% (e.g. too young to talk). New Zealand Sign Language was known by 1.9%. The percentage of people born overseas was 18.9, compared with 28.8% nationally.

Religious affiliations were 41.5% Christian, 3.8% Hindu, and 1.9% Islam. People who answered that they had no religion were 49.1%, and 5.7% of people did not answer the census question.

Of those at least 15 years old, 36 (32.4%) people had a bachelor's or higher degree, 51 (45.9%) had a post-high school certificate or diploma, and 24 (21.6%) people exclusively held high school qualifications. The median income was $53,100, compared with $41,500 nationally. 18 people (16.2%) earned over $100,000 compared to 12.1% nationally. The employment status of those at least 15 was that 75 (67.6%) people were employed full-time and 15 (13.5%) were part-time.

=== Lake Cameron statistical area ===
Lake Cameron statistical area covers 51.52 km^{2} (19.89 sq mi) and had an estimated population of 1,550 as of June 2025, with a population density of 30 people per km^{2}.

Historical population for Lake Cameron
Year	Pop.	±% p.a.
2006	1,170	—
2013	1,278	+1.27%
2018	1,479	+2.96%
2023	1,488	+0.12%

Lake Cameron had a population of 1,488 in the 2023 New Zealand census, an increase of 9 people (0.6%) since the 2018 census, and an increase of 210 people (16.4%) since the 2013 census. There were 747 males, 738 females and 3 people of other genders in 495 dwellings. 1.8% of people identified as LGBTIQ+. The median age was 39.1 years (compared with 38.1 years nationally). There were 336 people (22.6%) aged under 15 years, 246 (16.5%) aged 15 to 29, 705 (47.4%) aged 30 to 64, and 201 (13.5%) aged 65 or older.

People could identify as more than one ethnicity. The results were 85.1% European (Pākehā); 11.9% Māori; 2.2% Pasifika; 8.7% Asian; 1.8% Middle Eastern, Latin American and African New Zealanders (MELAA); and 2.6% other, which includes people giving their ethnicity as "New Zealander". English was spoken by 97.0%, Māori language by 3.0%, Samoan by 0.4%, and other languages by 11.5%. No language could be spoken by 1.8% (e.g. too young to talk). New Zealand Sign Language was known by 0.2%. The percentage of people born overseas was 21.2, compared with 28.8% nationally.

Religious affiliations were 41.3% Christian, 1.0% Hindu, 1.0% Islam, 0.2% Māori religious beliefs, 0.2% Buddhist, 0.2% New Age, and 1.8% other religions. People who answered that they had no religion were 47.2%, and 6.5% of people did not answer the census question.

Of those at least 15 years old, 360 (31.2%) people had a bachelor's or higher degree, 567 (49.2%) had a post-high school certificate or diploma, and 225 (19.5%) people exclusively held high school qualifications. The median income was $51,600, compared with $41,500 nationally. 195 people (16.9%) earned over $100,000 compared to 12.1% nationally. The employment status of those at least 15 was that 672 (58.3%) people were employed full-time, 186 (16.1%) were part-time, and 21 (1.8%) were unemployed.

== Education ==
Rukuhia School is a co-educational state primary school for Year 1 to 8 students, with a roll of 107 as of July 2026. The school opened in 1907.
