= Ngaroto railway station =

Defunct railway station in New Zealand

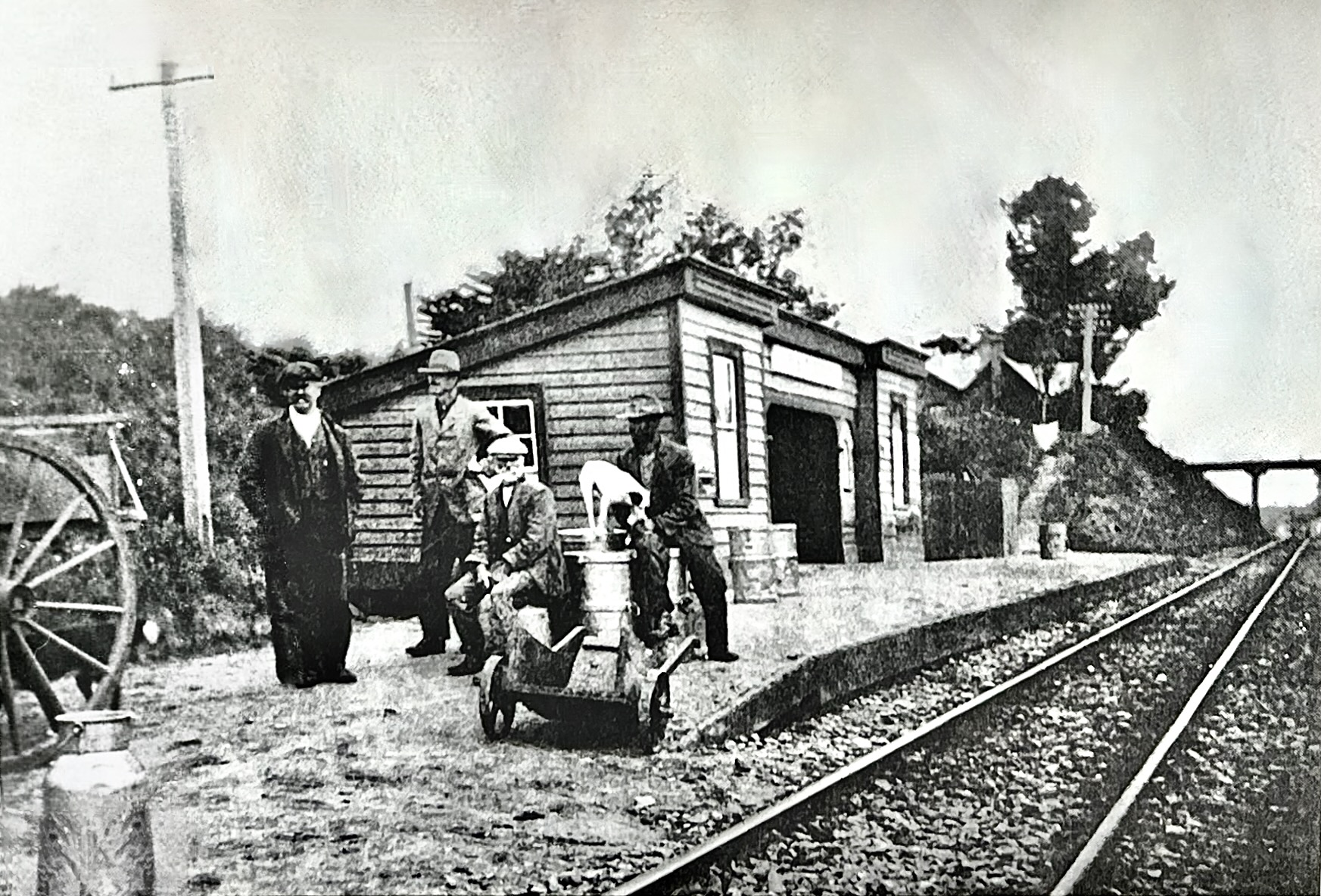
- Ngaroto railway station, probably around 1910

General information
- Location: New Zealand
- Coordinates: 37.981686°S 175.308495°E
- Elevation: 57 m (187 ft)
- Line: North Island Main Trunk
- Distance: Wellington 520.06 km (323.15 mi)

History
- Opened: 1 July 1880
- Closed: 15 December 1957
- Electrified: June 1988
- Former names: Ninia

Services
Preceding station	Historical railways	Following station
Lake Rd; Line open, station closed 3.4 km (2.1 mi) towards Waitematā	North Island Main Trunk; KiwiRail	Te Awamutu; Line open, station closed 3.04 km (1.89 mi) towards Wellington
Location

Ngaroto railway station was a station on the North Island Main Trunk in New Zealand, 3.42 km (2.13 mi) south of Lake Rd, 2 mi (3.2 km) north of Te Awamutu, near the entrance to Yarndley's Bush. Lake Ngaroto is visible from the railway to the north of the station.

The station was planned in 1879 and opened in 1880 at the same time the NIMT was extended to Te Awamutu, though it wasn't mentioned in the press until postal contracts were being let in 1881. The station and goods shed were being built in April 1880 and by 1884 Ngaroto had a 4th class station, passenger platform, cart approach, 60 ft (18 m) x 30 ft (9.1 m) goods shed, loading bank, stationmaster's house and urinals. From 1883 to 1917 there was a Post Office at the station. In 1897 a guard applied for additions to his house. There were cattle yards by 1897 and sheep yards by 1911. A crossing loop could hold 41 wagons. There was a proposal to close the station in 1886. It was staffed until 1887, when a ganger took on running the post office. In the early years it was a vital part of local farm transport. The decking of the road bridge was replaced in 1932. In 1936 there were plans to lower the track by 9 ft (2.7 m) and close the goods shed. In 1939 it was suggested the goods shed could be closed.

Apart from electrification, the only significant work since then seems to have been in 1928, when a lengthy embankment and raised bridge over the Mangapiko Stream lifted the line about 5 ft (1.5 m), to ease the climb from Te Awamutu to Ngaroto.

Ngaroto only featured in annual reports for 3 years –

year	tickets	season tickets	staff	ref.
1885	380		1	
1886	346		1	
1887	286	22	1	

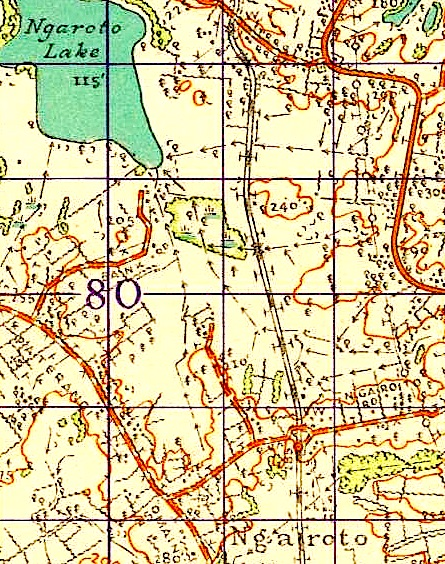
Ngaroto on 1946 one inch to one mile map

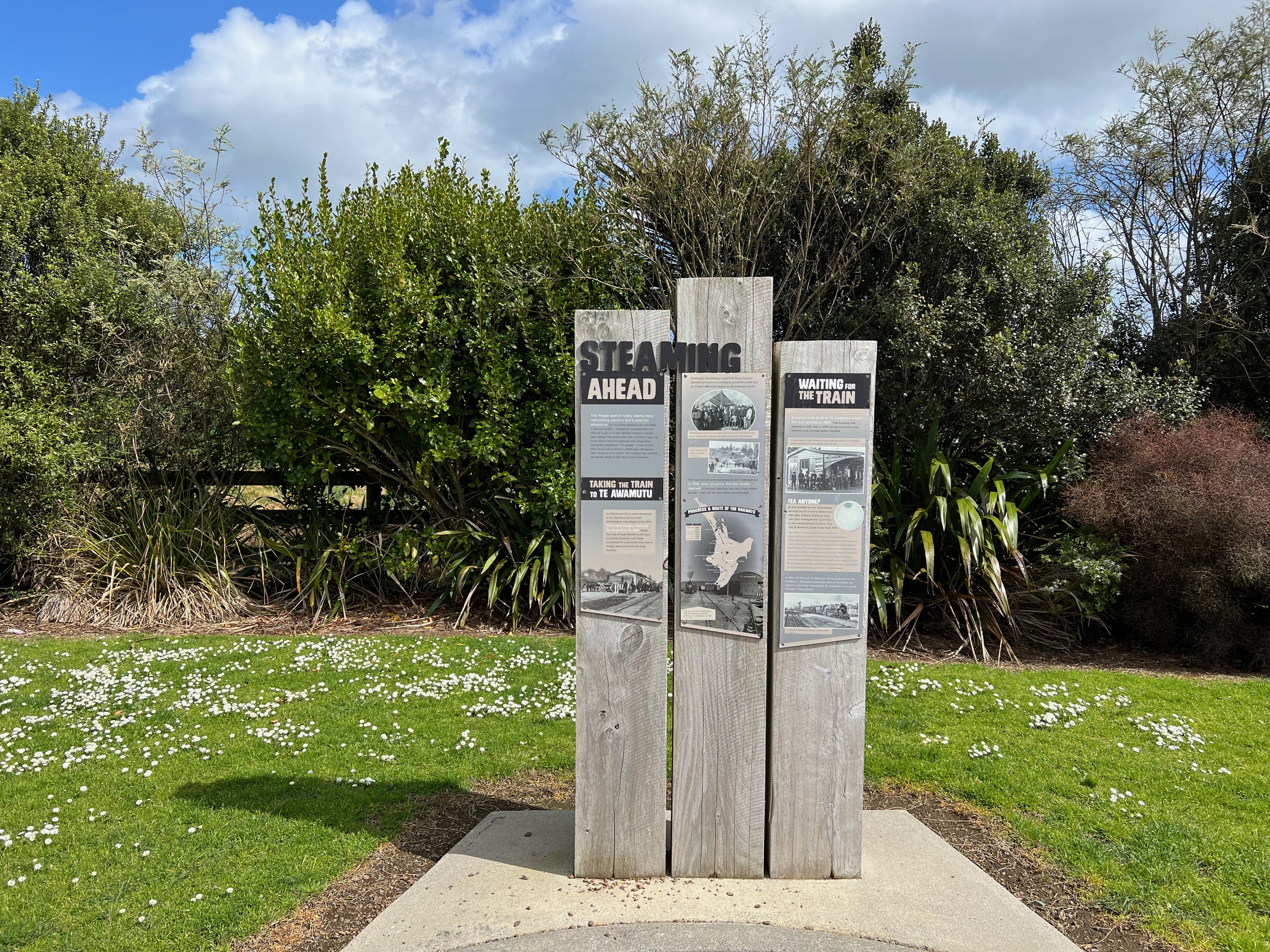
A board summarises the history of the railway, but doesn't mention the station, which used to be behind the hedge

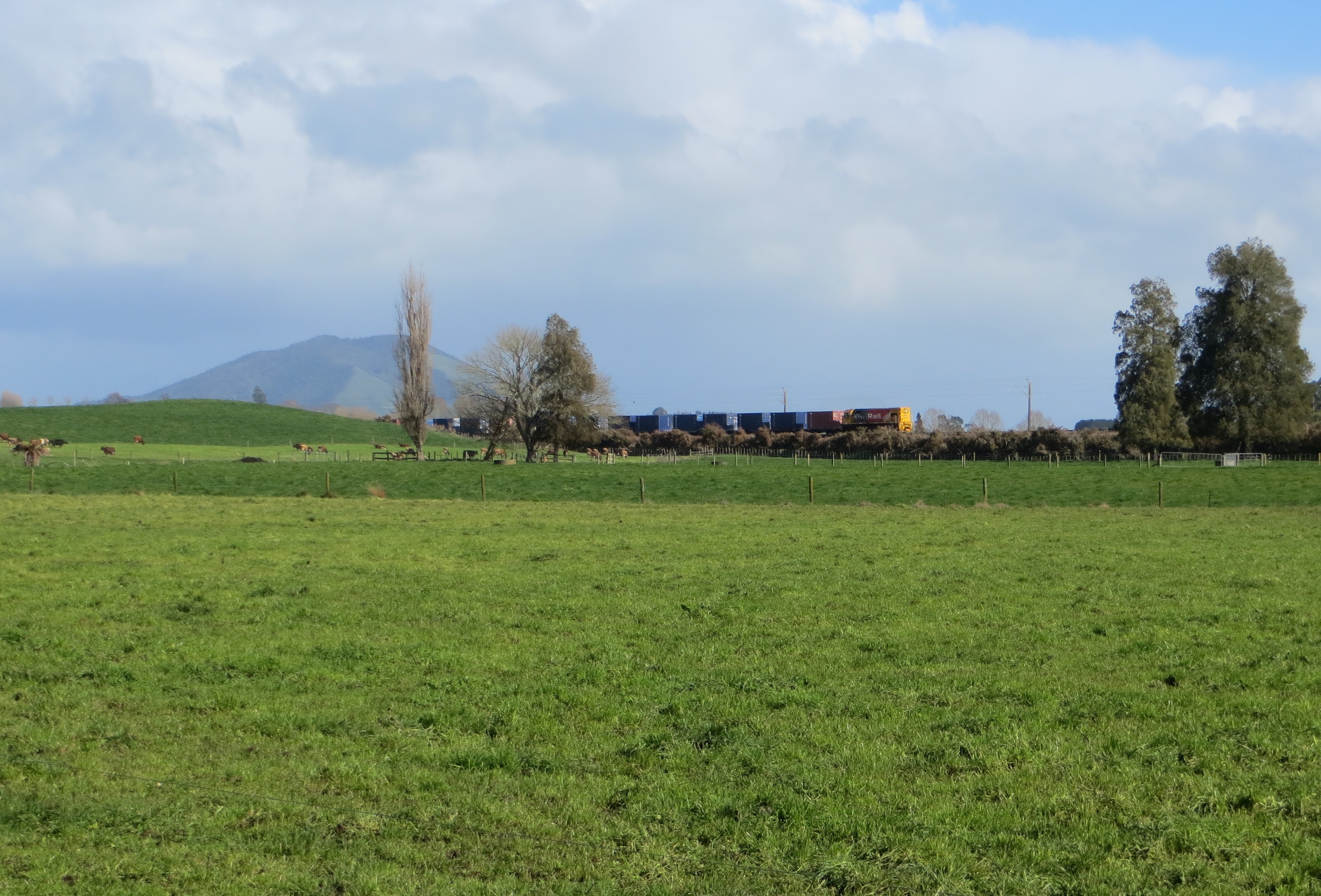
Te Awamutu dairy factory trip train climbing north to Ngaroto station site over the bank raised in 1928. Mt Kakepuku in background.

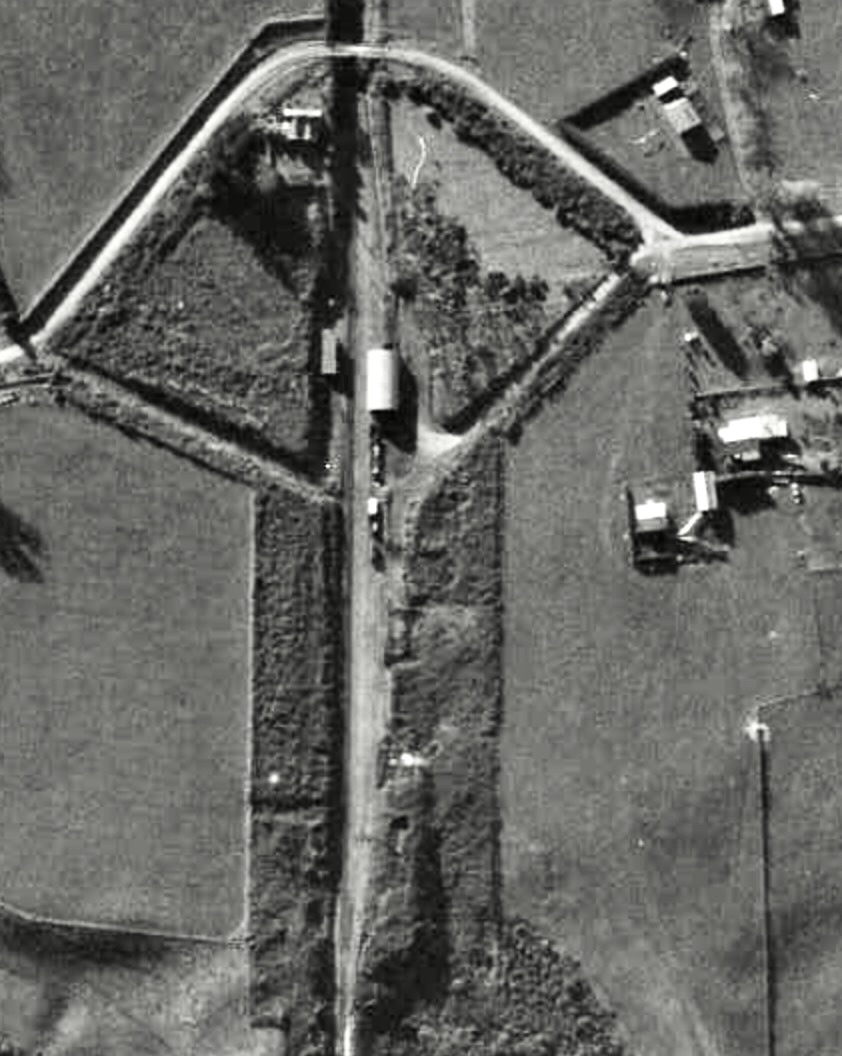
Ngaroto railway station in 1943

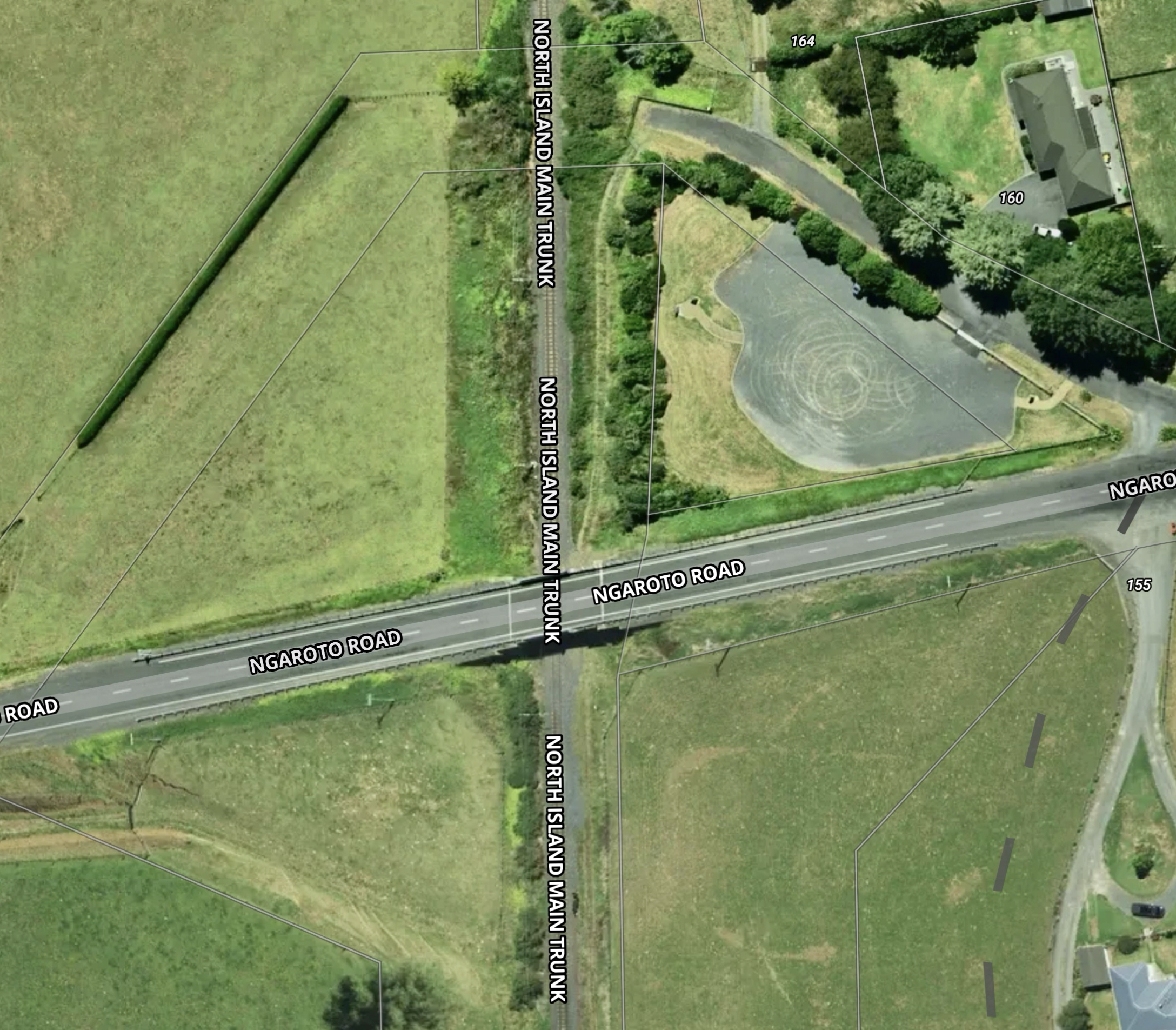
Ngaroto station site in 2021
