= Te Awamutu railway station =

Defunct railway station in New Zealand

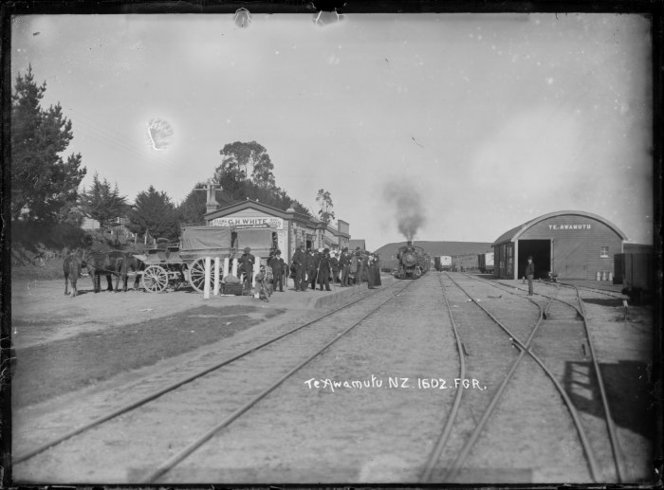
- Te Awamutu railway station about 1909.

General information
- Location: New Zealand
- Coordinates: 38.0050°S 175.3101°E
- Elevation: 50 m (160 ft)
- Line: North Island Main Trunk
- Distance: Wellington 517.02 km (321.26 mi)

History
- Opened: 1 July 1880
- Closed: 10 April 2005
- Electrified: June 1988

Services
Preceding station	Historical railways	Following station
Ngaroto; Line open, station closed 3.04 km (1.89 mi)	North Island Main Trunk; KiwiRail	Te Mawhai; Line open, station closed 4.16 km (2.58 mi)
Location

Te Awamutu was a temporary terminus, serving the border town of Te Awamutu, on the North Island Main Trunk (NIMT) in New Zealand from 1880, when the line was extended from Ōhaupō, until 1887, when the line was extended south to Ōtorohanga.

== History ==
=== Location ===
It was about 800 m (2,600 ft) from the town centre. A public meeting in 1878 supported a town centre site, but 6 months later, Goodfellow's paddock was chosen. Sir George Grey claimed that the station was so far from the town due to opposition from local residents, though another source described them as, "interested landed proprietors". In 1879 Rangiaohia Road Board asked for £750 to build the link road and footpaths, which were finished in 1880.

=== Construction ===
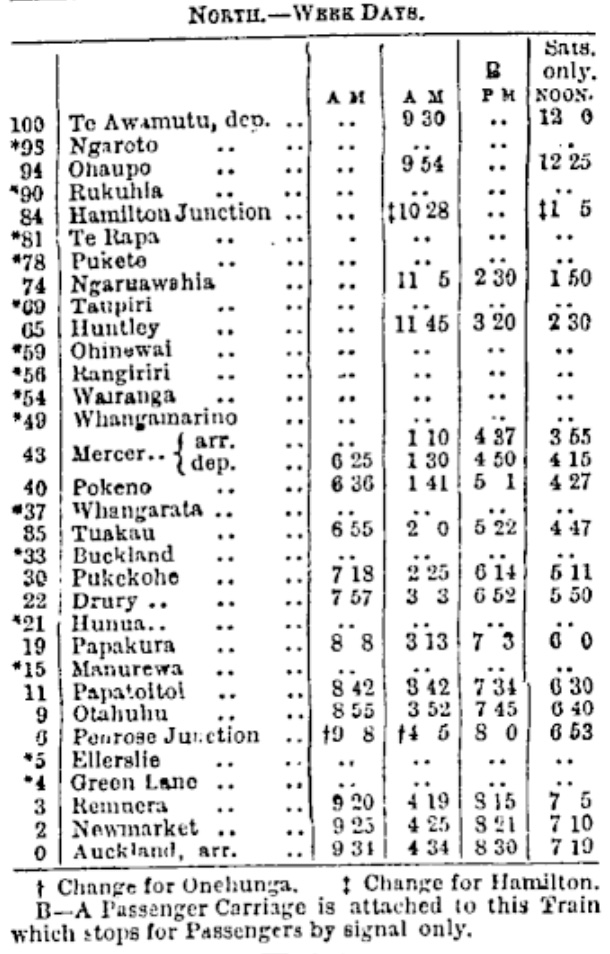
1880 Te Awamutu timetable

The 10 km (6.2 mi) extension from Ōhaupō was built for £25,972 by Daniel Fallon, who also built the Mercer to Ngāruawāhia section of the NIMT. Work started in 1878. On Wednesday, 19 May 1880 a test train, of two engines and 29 wagons of stone, reached Te Awamutu. The line was opened on Thursday, 1 July 1880, initially with one train a day, after £352 had been spent moving Ōhaupō's engine shed and building cattle pens. In 1881 another £45 was spent to move the engine driver's cottage. Other houses were bought or built in 1885, 1954 and 1955.

=== Extension ===
Surveying to extend the railway 14 mi 20 ch (22.9 km) from Te Awamutu to Ōtorohanga was started in 1883 by Charles Wilson Hursthouse. The first sod ceremony was performed at the Puniu River on 15 April 1885. Trains were working through to Ōtorohanga by January 1887, and the extension opened on 6, or 8 March 1887, though the line wasn't handed over from the Public Works Department to the Railways Department (NZR) until Wednesday 9 March.

=== Original station ===
By 1884 Te Awamutu had a 4th class station, platform, cart approach, a 100 ft (30 m) x 30 ft (9.1 m) goods shed, loading bank, cattle yards, water service, coal accommodation, engine shed, stationmaster's house, urinals and a passing loop for 37 wagons (extended to 55 by 1911 and 71 by 1980). A turntable was added in 1901, additions were made to the station in 1908, by 1911 there were sheep yards and fixed signals and in 1921 electric lighting was added. The 1902 edition of The Cyclopedia of New Zealand described the station as, "of wood and iron, and contains a public vestibule and waiting room, ladies' waiting room, and general office. It has also a long passenger platform and a convenient goods shed. The stationmaster is assisted by a junior porter and a guard, and two gangers are resident in Te Awamutu."

=== 1958 station ===
A new 133 ft (41 m) x 18 ft (5.5 m) station was opened on 26 November 1958 by Mayor Clifton Frank Jacobs. The platform was then 600 ft (180 m) long and 455 mm (17.9 in) high. In 1987 there was also a goods shed and shed for a shunting tractor. In 1943 there was a Royal New Zealand Air Force siding and in 1980 Dibble Brothers had a private siding for their fertiliser.

=== Services ===
Trains calling at Te Awamutu included The Overlander, Blue Streak, Scenic Daylight, Daylight Limited, Northerner and Night Limited.

The station buildings were demolished in 2001 and replaced by a shelter until the station closed in 2005. New Zealand Dairy Board (now Fonterra) rebuilt its freight connection about 2000.

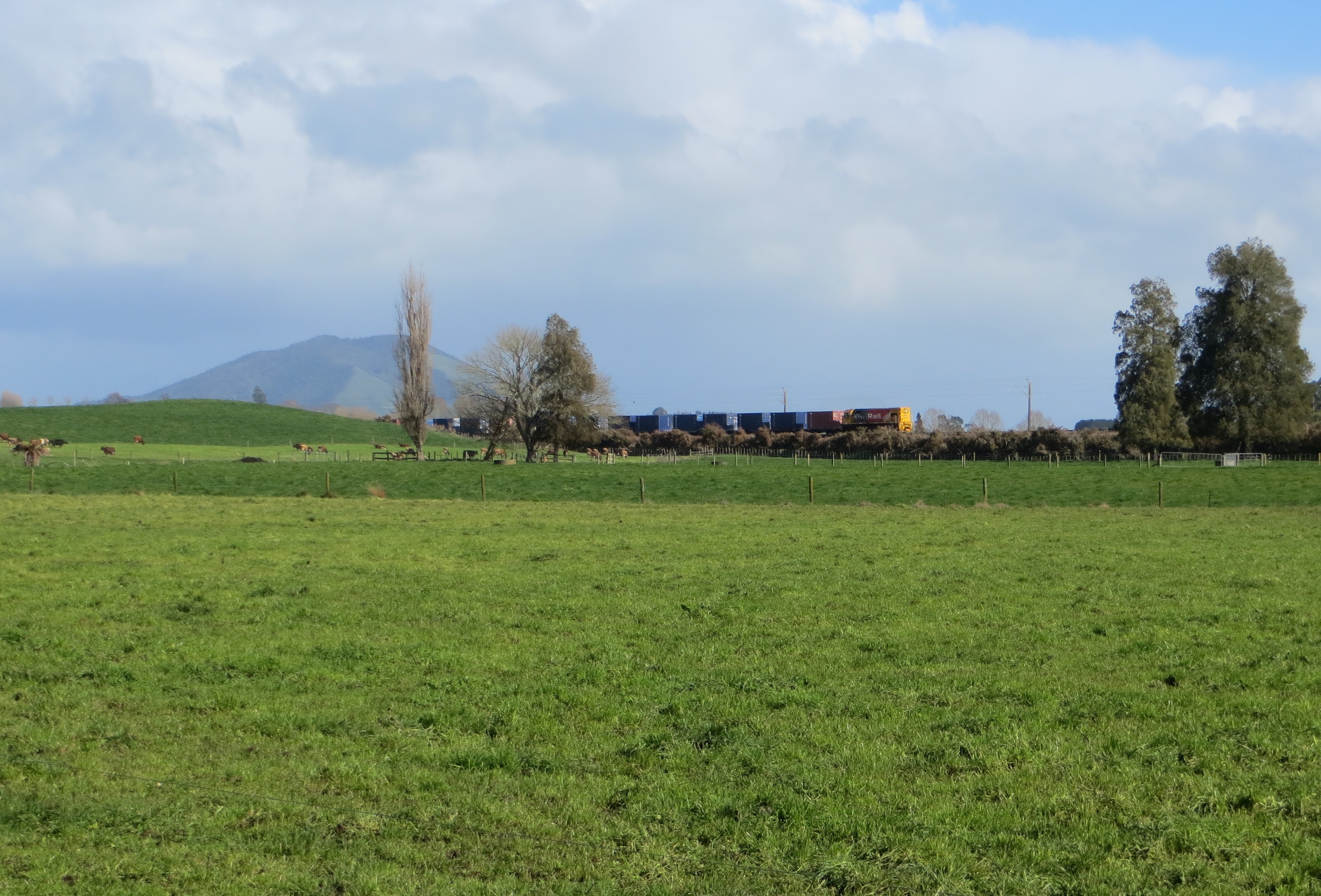
Te Awamutu dairy factory trip train. Mt Kakepuku in background. August 2014

Since 2005 there has been a large flow from the dairy factory to Crawford St depot in Hamilton. There are still hopes that passenger services may resume. For example, in 2015, Waipa District Council said, "it is important to preserve the rail platform facilities and infrastructure in Te Awamutu to enable future passenger rail connections between Te Awamutu and Hamilton". In 2021 it was agreed to remove the shelter due to vandalism.

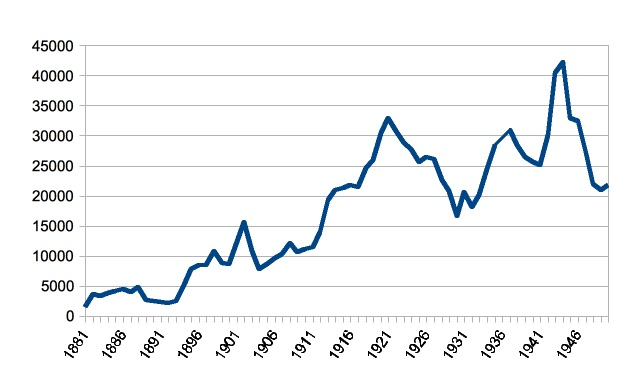
tickets sales 1881–1950 – derived from annual returns to Parliament of "Statement of Revenue for each Station for the Year ended"

=== Patronage ===
As shown in the table and graph below, passenger numbers peaked in 1921 and again in 1944 -

year	tickets	season tickets	staff	source	title
1881	1,493		3	https://paperspast.natlib.govt.nz/parliamentary/appendix-to-the-journals-of-the-house-of-representatives/1881/I/967	RETURN No. 9. Statement of Revenue and Expenditure of each Station for the Year ending 31 March 1881
1882	3,601		4	https://paperspast.natlib.govt.nz/parliamentary/appendix-to-the-journals-of-the-house-of-representatives/1882/I/824	RETURN No. 10. Statement of Revenue and Expenditure of each Station for the Year ending 31 March 1882
1883	3,358		4	https://paperspast.natlib.govt.nz/parliamentary/appendix-to-the-journals-of-the-house-of-representatives/1883/I/895	RETURN No. 10. STATEMENT of Revenue and Expenditure of each Station for the Year ended 31 March 1883
1884	3,818		4	https://paperspast.natlib.govt.nz/parliamentary/appendix-to-the-journals-of-the-house-of-representatives/1884/I/844	RETURN No. 10. STATEMENT of Revenue and Expenditure of each Station for the Twelve Months ending 31 March 1884
1885	4,128		3	https://paperspast.natlib.govt.nz/parliamentary/appendix-to-the-journals-of-the-house-of-representatives/1885/I/1156	RETURN No. 10. STATEMENT of Revenue and Expenditure of each Station for the Twelve Months ending 31 March 1885
1886	4,415		2	https://paperspast.natlib.govt.nz/parliamentary/appendix-to-the-journals-of-the-house-of-representatives/1886/I/1138	RETURN No. 10. STATEMENT of Revenue and Expenditure of each Station for the Twelve Months ending 31 March 1886
1887	3,942		2	https://paperspast.natlib.govt.nz/parliamentary/appendix-to-the-journals-of-the-house-of-representatives/1887/I/920	RETURN No. 10. STATEMENT of Revenue and Expenditure of each Station for the Twelve Months ending 31 March 1887
1888	4,812		2	https://paperspast.natlib.govt.nz/parliamentary/appendix-to-the-journals-of-the-house-of-representatives/1889/I/1068?large_image=true	RETURN No. 10. STATEMENT of Revenue and Expenditure of each Station for the Twelve Months ending 31 March 1888
1889	2,623		2	https://paperspast.natlib.govt.nz/parliamentary/appendix-to-the-journals-of-the-house-of-representatives/1889/I/1068	RETURN No. 10. STATEMENT of Revenue and Expenditure of each Station for the Twelve Months ending 31 March 1889
1891	2,241		2	https://paperspast.natlib.govt.nz/parliamentary/appendix-to-the-journals-of-the-house-of-representatives/1891/II/1264	RETURN No. 10. STATEMENT of Revenue and Expenditure of each Station for the Twelve Months ending 31 March 1891
1892	2,060		2	https://paperspast.natlib.govt.nz/parliamentary/appendix-to-the-journals-of-the-house-of-representatives/1892/I/1164	RETURN No. 10. STATEMENT of Revenue and Expenditure of each Station for the Twelve Months ending 31 March 1892
1893	2,510		2	https://paperspast.natlib.govt.nz/parliamentary/appendix-to-the-journals-of-the-house-of-representatives/1893/I/1494	RETURN No. 10. STATEMENT of Revenue and Expenditure of each Station for the Twelve Months ending 31 March 1893
1894	5,061		3	https://paperspast.natlib.govt.nz/parliamentary/appendix-to-the-journals-of-the-house-of-representatives/1894/I/1388	RETURN No. 10. STATEMENT of Revenue and Expenditure of each Station for the Twelve Months ending 31 March 1894
1895	7,727		3	https://paperspast.natlib.govt.nz/parliamentary/appendix-to-the-journals-of-the-house-of-representatives/1895/I/1586	RETURN No. 10. STATEMENT of Revenue and Expenditure of each Station for the Twelve Months ending 31 March 1895
1896	8,382		3	https://paperspast.natlib.govt.nz/parliamentary/appendix-to-the-journals-of-the-house-of-representatives/1896/I/1624	RETURN No. 10. STATEMENT of Revenue and Expenditure of each Station for the Twelve Months ending 31 March 1896
1897	8,513		3	https://paperspast.natlib.govt.nz/parliamentary/appendix-to-the-journals-of-the-house-of-representatives/1897/II/1610	RETURN No. 12. STATEMENT of Revenue and Expenditure of each Station for the Year ended 31 March 1897
1898	10,777	1	3	https://paperspast.natlib.govt.nz/parliamentary/appendix-to-the-journals-of-the-house-of-representatives/1898/I/1670	RETURN No. 12. STATEMENT of Revenue and Expenditure of each Station for the Year ended 31 March 1898
1899	8,730		3	https://paperspast.natlib.govt.nz/parliamentary/appendix-to-the-journals-of-the-house-of-representatives/1899/I/1824	RETURN No. 12. STATEMENT of Revenue and Expenditure of each Station for the Year ended 31 March 1899
1900	8,550		3	https://paperspast.natlib.govt.nz/parliamentary/appendix-to-the-journals-of-the-house-of-representatives/1900/I/1612	RETURN No. 12. STATEMENT of Revenue and Expenditure of each Station for the Year ended 31 March 1900
1902	15,515		5	https://paperspast.natlib.govt.nz/parliamentary/appendix-to-the-journals-of-the-house-of-representatives/1902/I/1436	RETURN No. 12. STATEMENT of Revenue and Expenditure of each Station for the Year ended 31 March 1902
1903	10,851	5	4	https://paperspast.natlib.govt.nz/parliamentary/appendix-to-the-journals-of-the-house-of-representatives/1903/I/1873	RETURN No. 12. STATEMENT of Revenue and Expenditure of each Station for the Year ended 31 March 1903
1904	7,807	1	4	https://paperspast.natlib.govt.nz/parliamentary/appendix-to-the-journals-of-the-house-of-representatives/1904/I/1848	RETURN No. 12. STATEMENT of Revenue and Expenditure of each Station for the Year ended 31 March 1904
1905	8,650	60	4	https://paperspast.natlib.govt.nz/parliamentary/appendix-to-the-journals-of-the-house-of-representatives/1905/I/3767	RETURN No. 12. STATEMENT of Revenue and Expenditure of each Station for the Year ended 31 March 1905
1906	9,664	74	5	https://paperspast.natlib.govt.nz/parliamentary/appendix-to-the-journals-of-the-house-of-representatives/1906/II/1600	RETURN No. 12. STATEMENT of Revenue and Expenditure of each Station for the Year ended 31 March 1906
1907	10,312	39	4	https://paperspast.natlib.govt.nz/parliamentary/appendix-to-the-journals-of-the-house-of-representatives/1907/I/2542	RETURN No. 12. STATEMENT of Revenue and Expenditure of each Station for the Year ended 31 March 1907
1908	12,158	68	3	https://paperspast.natlib.govt.nz/parliamentary/appendix-to-the-journals-of-the-house-of-representatives/1908/I/2061	RETURN No. 12. STATEMENT of Revenue and Expenditure of each Station for the Year ended 31 March 1908
1909	10,629	61	5	https://paperspast.natlib.govt.nz/parliamentary/appendix-to-the-journals-of-the-house-of-representatives/1909/II/1832	RETURN No. 12. STATEMENT of Revenue and Expenditure of each Station for the Year ended 31 March 1909
1910	11,073	79	5	https://paperspast.natlib.govt.nz/parliamentary/appendix-to-the-journals-of-the-house-of-representatives/1910/I/2050	RETURN No. 12. STATEMENT of Revenue and Expenditure of each Station for the Year ended 31 March 1910
1911	11,390	110	6	https://paperspast.natlib.govt.nz/parliamentary/appendix-to-the-journals-of-the-house-of-representatives/1911/I/2497	RETURN No. 12. STATEMENT of Revenue and Expenditure of each Station for the Year ended 31 March 1911
1912	13,859	207	5	https://paperspast.natlib.govt.nz/parliamentary/appendix-to-the-journals-of-the-house-of-representatives/1912/II/2420	RETURN No. 12. STATEMENT of Revenue and Expenditure of each Station for the Year ended 31 March 1912
1913	19,276	188	6	https://paperspast.natlib.govt.nz/parliamentary/appendix-to-the-journals-of-the-house-of-representatives/1913/I/3693	RETURN No. 12. STATEMENT of Revenue and Expenditure of each Station for the Year ended 31 March 1913
1914	20,859	218		https://paperspast.natlib.govt.nz/parliamentary/appendix-to-the-journals-of-the-house-of-representatives/1914/I/2031	RETURN No. 12. Statement of Revenue for each Station for the Year ended 31 March 1914
1915	21,231	208		https://paperspast.natlib.govt.nz/parliamentary/appendix-to-the-journals-of-the-house-of-representatives/1915/I/1638	RETURN No. 12. Statement of Revenue for each Station for the Year ended 31 March 1915
1916	21,738	203		https://paperspast.natlib.govt.nz/parliamentary/appendix-to-the-journals-of-the-house-of-representatives/1916/I/1053	RETURN No. 12. Statement of Revenue for each Station for the Year ended 31 March 1916
1917	21,419	242		https://paperspast.natlib.govt.nz/parliamentary/appendix-to-the-journals-of-the-house-of-representatives/1917/I/1123	RETURN No. 12. Statement of Revenue for each Station for the Year ended 31 March 1917
1918	24,548	321		https://paperspast.natlib.govt.nz/parliamentary/appendix-to-the-journals-of-the-house-of-representatives/1918/I-II/1159	RETURN No. 12. Statement of Revenue for each Station for the Year ended 31 March 1918
1919	25,961	182		https://paperspast.natlib.govt.nz/parliamentary/appendix-to-the-journals-of-the-house-of-representatives/1919/I/1231	RETURN No. 12. Statement of Revenue for each Station for the Year ended 31 March 1919
1920	30,409	117		https://paperspast.natlib.govt.nz/parliamentary/appendix-to-the-journals-of-the-house-of-representatives/1920/I/1349	RETURN No. 12. Statement of Revenue for each Station for the Year ended 31 March 1920
1921	32,830	160		https://paperspast.natlib.govt.nz/parliamentary/appendix-to-the-journals-of-the-house-of-representatives/1921/I-II/1452	RETURN No. 12. Statement of Revenue for each Station for the Year ended 31 March 1921
1922	30,697	71		https://paperspast.natlib.govt.nz/parliamentary/appendix-to-the-journals-of-the-house-of-representatives/1922/I/1409	RETURN No. 12. Statement of Revenue for each Station for the Year ended 31 March 1922
1923	28,725	205		https://paperspast.natlib.govt.nz/parliamentary/appendix-to-the-journals-of-the-house-of-representatives/1923/I-II/1321	RETURN No. 12. Statement of Revenue for each Station for the Year ended 31 March 1923
1924	27,819	231		https://paperspast.natlib.govt.nz/parliamentary/appendix-to-the-journals-of-the-house-of-representatives/1924/I/2458	RETURN No. 12. Statement of Revenue for each Station for the Year ended 31 March 1924
1925	25,517	229		https://paperspast.natlib.govt.nz/parliamentary/appendix-to-the-journals-of-the-house-of-representatives/1925/I/1804	RETURN No. 12. Statement of Traffic and Revenue for each Station for the Year ended 31 March 1925
1926	26,420	294		https://paperspast.natlib.govt.nz/parliamentary/appendix-to-the-journals-of-the-house-of-representatives/1926/I/1930	STATEMENT No. 18 Statement of Traffic and Revenue for each Station for the Year ended 31 March 1926
1927	26,108	357		https://paperspast.natlib.govt.nz/parliamentary/appendix-to-the-journals-of-the-house-of-representatives/1927/I/2230	STATEMENT No. 18 Statement of Traffic and Revenue for each Station for the Year ended 31 March 1927
1928	22,673	277		https://paperspast.natlib.govt.nz/parliamentary/appendix-to-the-journals-of-the-house-of-representatives/1928/I/2628	STATEMENT No. 18 Statement of Traffic and Revenue for each Station for the Year ended 31 March 1928
1929	20,719	240		https://paperspast.natlib.govt.nz/parliamentary/appendix-to-the-journals-of-the-house-of-representatives/1929/I/2090	STATEMENT No. 18 Statement of Traffic and Revenue for each Station for the Year ended 31 March 1929
1930	16,547	153		https://paperspast.natlib.govt.nz/parliamentary/appendix-to-the-journals-of-the-house-of-representatives/1930/I/2212	STATEMENT No. 18 Statement of Traffic and Revenue for each Station for the Year ended 31 March 1930
1931	20,539	170		https://paperspast.natlib.govt.nz/parliamentary/appendix-to-the-journals-of-the-house-of-representatives/1931/I-II/1778	STATEMENT No. 18 Statement of Traffic and Revenue for each Station for the Year ended 31 March 1931
1932	18,094	181		https://paperspast.natlib.govt.nz/parliamentary/appendix-to-the-journals-of-the-house-of-representatives/1932/I-II/1934	STATEMENT No. 18 Statement of Traffic and Revenue for each Station for the Year ended 31 March 1932
1933	20,144	232		https://paperspast.natlib.govt.nz/parliamentary/appendix-to-the-journals-of-the-house-of-representatives/1933/I/1388	STATEMENT No. 18 Statement of Traffic and Revenue for each Station for the Year ended 31 March 1933
1934	24,461	235		https://paperspast.natlib.govt.nz/parliamentary/appendix-to-the-journals-of-the-house-of-representatives/1934/I/2278	STATEMENT No. 18 Statement of Traffic and Revenue for each Station for the Year ended 31 March 1934
1935	28,425	259		https://paperspast.natlib.govt.nz/parliamentary/appendix-to-the-journals-of-the-house-of-representatives/1935/I/1326	STATEMENT No. 18 Statement of Traffic and Revenue for each Station for the Year ended 31 March 1935
1936	29,629	226		https://paperspast.natlib.govt.nz/parliamentary/appendix-to-the-journals-of-the-house-of-representatives/1936/I/1552	STATEMENT No. 18 Statement of Traffic and Revenue for each Station for the Year ended 31 March 1936
1937	30,868	252		https://paperspast.natlib.govt.nz/parliamentary/appendix-to-the-journals-of-the-house-of-representatives/1937/I/1896	STATEMENT No. 18 Statement of Traffic and Revenue for each Station for the Year ended 31 March 1937
1938	28,341	214		https://paperspast.natlib.govt.nz/parliamentary/appendix-to-the-journals-of-the-house-of-representatives/1938/I/1652	STATEMENT No. 18 Statement of Traffic and Revenue for each Station for the Year ended 31 March 1938
1939	26,489	190		https://paperspast.natlib.govt.nz/parliamentary/appendix-to-the-journals-of-the-house-of-representatives/1939/I/1970	STATEMENT No. 18 Statement of Traffic and Revenue for each Station for the Year ended 31 March 1939
1940	25,546	128		https://paperspast.natlib.govt.nz/parliamentary/appendix-to-the-journals-of-the-house-of-representatives/1940/I/1314	STATEMENT No. 18 Statement of Traffic and Revenue for each Station for the Year ended 31 March 1940
1941	25,044	168		https://paperspast.natlib.govt.nz/parliamentary/appendix-to-the-journals-of-the-house-of-representatives/1941/I/1203	STATEMENT No. 18 Statement of Traffic and Revenue for each Station for the Year ended 31 March 1941
1942	30,083	77		https://paperspast.natlib.govt.nz/parliamentary/appendix-to-the-journals-of-the-house-of-representatives/1942/I/651	STATEMENT No. 18 Statement of Traffic and Revenue for each Station for the Year ended 31 March 1942
1943	40,442	95		https://paperspast.natlib.govt.nz/parliamentary/appendix-to-the-journals-of-the-house-of-representatives/1943/I/679	STATEMENT No. 18 Statement of Traffic and Revenue for each Station for the Year ended 31 March 1943
1944	42,160	105		https://paperspast.natlib.govt.nz/parliamentary/appendix-to-the-journals-of-the-house-of-representatives/1944/I/895	STATEMENT No. 18 Statement of Traffic and Revenue for each Station for the Year ended 31 March 1944
1945	32,846	17		https://paperspast.natlib.govt.nz/parliamentary/appendix-to-the-journals-of-the-house-of-representatives/1945/I/969	STATEMENT No. 18 Statement of Traffic and Revenue for each Station for the Year ended 31 March 1945
1946	32,440	20		https://paperspast.natlib.govt.nz/parliamentary/appendix-to-the-journals-of-the-house-of-representatives/1946/I/1548	STATEMENT No. 18 Statement of Traffic and Revenue for each Station for the Year ended 31 March 1946
1947	27,123	23		https://paperspast.natlib.govt.nz/parliamentary/appendix-to-the-journals-of-the-house-of-representatives/1947/I/2495	STATEMENT No. 18 Statement of Traffic and Revenue for each Station for the Year ended 31 March 1947
1948	21,879	11		https://paperspast.natlib.govt.nz/parliamentary/appendix-to-the-journals-of-the-house-of-representatives/1948/I/2521	STATEMENT No. 18 Statement of Traffic and Revenue for each Station for the Year ended 31 March 1948
1949	20,948	13		https://paperspast.natlib.govt.nz/parliamentary/appendix-to-the-journals-of-the-house-of-representatives/1949/I/2104	STATEMENT No. 18 Statement of Traffic and Revenue for each Station for the Year ended 31 March 1949
1950	21,794	13		https://paperspast.natlib.govt.nz/parliamentary/appendix-to-the-journals-of-the-house-of-representatives/1950/I/2366	STATEMENT No. 18 Statement of Traffic and Revenue for each Station for the Year ended 31 March 1950
